= 1990–91 Boston Bruins season =

NHL team season

1990–91 Boston Bruins
- Adams Division champions
- Division: 1st Adams
- Conference: 1st Wales
- 1990–91 record: 44–24–12
- Home record: 26–9–5
- Road record: 18–15–7
- Goals for: 299
- Goals against: 264

Team information
- General manager: Harry Sinden
- Coach: Mike Milbury
- Captain: Ray Bourque
- Alternate captains: Craig Janney; Cam Neely
- Arena: Boston Garden

Team leaders
- Goals: Cam Neely (51)
- Assists: Ray Bourque (73)
- Points: Ray Bourque (94)
- Penalty minutes: Chris Nilan (277)
- Wins: Andy Moog (25)
- Goals against average: Andy Moog (2.87)

The 1990–91 Boston Bruins season was the Bruins' 67th season. The season involved participating in the Prince of Wales Conference finals.

== Offseason ==
=== NHL draft ===
Boston's draft picks at the 1990 NHL entry draft held at the BC Place in Vancouver, British Columbia.

Round	#	Player	Nationality	College/Junior/Club team (League)
1	21	Bryan Smolinski	United States	Michigan State University (CCHA)
3	64	Cam Stewart	Canada	Elmira Sugar Kings (MWJHL)
4	84	Jerry Buckley	United States	Northwood School (USHS-NY)
5	105	Mike Bales	Canada	Ohio State University (WCHA)
6	126	Mark Woolf	Canada	Spokane Chiefs (WHL)
7	147	Jim Mackey	United States	Hotchkiss School (USHS-CT)
8	168	John Gruden	United States	Waterloo Black Hawks (USHL)
9	189	Darren Wetherill	Canada	Minot Americans (SJHL)
10	210	Dean Capuano	United States	Mount Saint Charles Academy (USHS-RI)
11	231	Andy Bezeau	Canada	Niagara Falls Thunder (OHL)
12	252	Ted Miskolczi	Canada	Belleville Bulls (OHL)
S	26	Howie Rosenblatt	United States	Merrimack College (Hockey East)

== Regular season ==
=== Final standings ===
Adams Division
	GP	W	L	T	GF	GA	Pts
**Boston Bruins**	80	44	24	12	299	264	100
**Montreal Canadiens**	80	39	30	11	273	249	89
**Buffalo Sabres**	80	31	30	19	292	278	81
**Hartford Whalers**	80	31	38	11	238	276	73
Quebec Nordiques	80	16	50	14	236	354	46

Note: GP = Games played, W = Wins, L = Losses, T = Ties, Pts = Points, GF = Goals for, GA = Goals against
Note: Teams that qualified for the playoffs are highlighted in bold.

Wales Conference
R		Div	GP	W	L	T	GF	GA	Pts
**1**	**Boston Bruins**	**ADM**	**80**	**44**	**24**	**12**	**299**	**264**	**100**
**2**	**Montreal Canadiens**	**ADM**	**80**	**39**	**30**	**11**	**273**	**249**	**89**
**3**	**Pittsburgh Penguins**	**PTK**	**80**	**41**	**33**	**6**	**342**	**305**	**88**
**4**	**New York Rangers**	**PTK**	**80**	**36**	**31**	**13**	**297**	**265**	**85**
**5**	**Washington Capitals**	**PTK**	**80**	**37**	**36**	**7**	**258**	**258**	**81**
**6**	**Buffalo Sabres**	**ADM**	**80**	**31**	**30**	**19**	**292**	**278**	**81**
**7**	**New Jersey Devils**	**PTK**	**80**	**32**	**33**	**15**	**272**	**264**	**79**
8	Philadelphia Flyers	PTK	80	33	37	10	252	267	76
**9**	**Hartford Whalers**	**ADM**	**80**	**31**	**38**	**11**	**238**	**276**	**73**
10	New York Islanders	PTK	80	25	45	10	223	290	60
11	Quebec Nordiques	ADM	80	16	50	14	236	354	46

Divisions: PTK – Patrick, ADM – Adams

bold – Qualified for playoffs

== Schedule and results ==
1990–91 regular season
October

Game	Result	Date	Score	Opponent	Record
1	W	October 4, 1990	4–1	Philadelphia Flyers (1990–91)	1–0–0
2	W	October 6, 1990	7–1	Quebec Nordiques (1990–91)	2–0–0
3	W	October 7, 1990	5–2	@ Quebec Nordiques (1990–91)	3–0–0
4	W	October 10, 1990	4–2	@ Winnipeg Jets (1990–91)	4–0–0
5	T	October 11, 1990	3–3 OT	@ Minnesota North Stars (1990–91)	4–0–1
6	L	October 13, 1990	1–7	@ Los Angeles Kings (1990–91)	4–1–1
7	L	October 17, 1990	1–3	@ Vancouver Canucks (1990–91)	4–2–1
8	L	October 19, 1990	1–8	@ Edmonton Oilers (1990–91)	4–3–1
9	L	October 20, 1990	1–8	@ Calgary Flames (1990–91)	4–4–1
10	W	October 25, 1990	4–2	Vancouver Canucks (1990–91)	5–4–1
11	W	October 27, 1990	5–4	Chicago Blackhawks (1990–91)	6–4–1
12	T	October 31, 1990	3–3 OT	@ Buffalo Sabres (1990–91)	6–4–2

November

Game	Result	Date	Score	Opponent	Record
13	W	November 1, 1990	3–2 OT	St. Louis Blues (1990–91)	7–4–2
14	L	November 3, 1990	1–4	Buffalo Sabres (1990–91)	7–5–2
15	W	November 5, 1990	3–2 OT	@ New York Rangers (1990–91)	8–5–2
16	W	November 7, 1990	2–0	@ Montreal Canadiens (1990–91)	9–5–2
17	T	November 10, 1990	3–3 OT	Pittsburgh Penguins (1990–91)	9–5–3
18	W	November 11, 1990	5–3	@ Washington Capitals (1990–91)	10–5–3
19	L	November 14, 1990	1–3	@ Hartford Whalers (1990–91)	10–6–3
20	W	November 15, 1990	6–0	Quebec Nordiques (1990–91)	11–6–3
21	T	November 17, 1990	1–1 OT	Montreal Canadiens (1990–91)	11–6–4
22	W	November 19, 1990	5–2	@ Toronto Maple Leafs (1990–91)	12–6–4
23	L	November 23, 1990	3–4	Hartford Whalers (1990–91)	12–7–4
24	W	November 24, 1990	4–3	@ Hartford Whalers (1990–91)	13–7–4
25	W	November 29, 1990	4–2	Edmonton Oilers (1990–91)	14–7–4

December

Game	Result	Date	Score	Opponent	Record
26	L	December 1, 1990	4–5	New York Rangers (1990–91)	14–8–4
27	W	December 4, 1990	5–4 OT	@ Detroit Red Wings (1990–91)	15–8–4
28	L	December 6, 1990	4–6	Montreal Canadiens (1990–91)	15–9–4
29	L	December 8, 1990	1–7	@ Montreal Canadiens (1990–91)	15–10–4
30	W	December 9, 1990	3–2	@ Buffalo Sabres (1990–91)	16–10–4
31	W	December 12, 1990	5–1	@ Hartford Whalers (1990–91)	17–10–4
32	W	December 13, 1990	8–2	Hartford Whalers (1990–91)	18–10–4
33	T	December 15, 1990	1–1 OT	New Jersey Devils (1990–91)	18–10–5
34	L	December 18, 1990	3–8	@ New Jersey Devils (1990–91)	18–11–5
35	W	December 20, 1990	4–1	Buffalo Sabres (1990–91)	19–11–5
36	W	December 22, 1990	6–2	Minnesota North Stars (1990–91)	20–11–5
37	T	December 23, 1990	5–5 OT	@ New York Rangers (1990–91)	20–11–6
38	T	December 26, 1990	3–3 OT	@ Buffalo Sabres (1990–91)	20–11–7
39	L	December 28, 1990	0–6	@ Winnipeg Jets (1990–91)	20–12–7
40	T	December 29, 1990	4–4 OT	@ Minnesota North Stars (1990–91)	20–12–8

January

Game	Result	Date	Score	Opponent	Record
41	W	January 3, 1991	8–3	Vancouver Canucks (1990–91)	21–12–8
42	L	January 5, 1991	3–5	Washington Capitals (1990–91)	21–13–8
43	W	January 7, 1991	5–2	Winnipeg Jets (1990–91)	22–13–8
44	L	January 8, 1991	2–4	@ Quebec Nordiques (1990–91)	22–14–8
45	W	January 10, 1991	5–3	Quebec Nordiques (1990–91)	23–14–8
46	L	January 12, 1991	1–3	Philadelphia Flyers (1990–91)	23–15–8
47	W	January 14, 1991	6–1	Detroit Red Wings (1990–91)	24–15–8
48	W	January 15, 1991	5–4	@ New York Islanders (1990–91)	25–15–8
49	W	January 17, 1991	5–3	Los Angeles Kings (1990–91)	26–15–8
50	L	January 22, 1991	4–6	@ Buffalo Sabres (1990–91)	26–16–8
51	W	January 24, 1991	3–0	Hartford Whalers (1990–91)	27–16–8
52	W	January 26, 1991	5–2	Calgary Flames (1990–91)	28–16–8
53	W	January 27, 1991	3–1	@ Montreal Canadiens (1990–91)	29–16–8
54	W	January 31, 1991	5–2	Montreal Canadiens (1990–91)	30–16–8

February

Game	Result	Date	Score	Opponent	Record
55	L	February 2, 1991	2–6	@ Pittsburgh Penguins (1990–91)	30–17–8
56	W	February 3, 1991	6–3	Pittsburgh Penguins (1990–91)	31–17–8
57	W	February 5, 1991	6–5 OT	Edmonton Oilers (1990–91)	32–17–8
58	L	February 7, 1991	1–4	Calgary Flames (1990–91)	32–18–8
59	W	February 9, 1991	5–3	Chicago Blackhawks (1990–91)	33–18–8
60	W	February 10, 1991	7–4	@ Quebec Nordiques (1990–91)	34–18–8
61	W	February 13, 1991	7–4	@ Montreal Canadiens (1990–91)	35–18–8
62	W	February 16, 1991	5–4 OT	@ Los Angeles Kings (1990–91)	36–18–8
63	L	February 21, 1991	1–4	@ Chicago Blackhawks (1990–91)	36–19–8
64	L	February 23, 1991	2–9	@ St. Louis Blues (1990–91)	36–20–8
65	W	February 28, 1991	5–0	New York Islanders (1990–91)	37–20–8

March

Game	Result	Date	Score	Opponent	Record
66	L	March 2, 1991	4–7	Buffalo Sabres (1990–91)	37–21–8
67	W	March 3, 1991	3–1	@ New Jersey Devils (1990–91)	38–21–8
68	L	March 5, 1991	3–6	@ Toronto Maple Leafs (1990–91)	38–22–8
69	T	March 7, 1991	5–5 OT	St. Louis Blues (1990–91)	38–22–9
70	W	March 9, 1991	2–0	Toronto Maple Leafs (1990–91)	39–22–9
71	W	March 14, 1991	3–2	Montreal Canadiens (1990–91)	40–22–9
72	L	March 16, 1991	3–5	Detroit Red Wings (1990–91)	40–23–9
73	W	March 17, 1991	3–1	@ Philadelphia Flyers (1990–91)	41–23–9
74	T	March 19, 1991	1–1 OT	@ Hartford Whalers (1990–91)	41–23–10
75	T	March 21, 1991	3–3 OT	Quebec Nordiques (1990–91)	41–23–11
76	W	March 23, 1991	6–3	Buffalo Sabres (1990–91)	42–23–11
77	T	March 24, 1991	3–3 OT	@ Washington Capitals (1990–91)	42–23–12
78	W	March 26, 1991	7–4	@ Quebec Nordiques (1990–91)	43–23–12
79	L	March 30, 1991	3–5	@ New York Islanders (1990–91)	43–24–12
80	W	March 31, 1991	7–3	Hartford Whalers (1990–91)	44–24–12

Legend: Win (2 points) Loss (0 points) Tie (1 point)

== Playoffs ==
1991 Stanley Cup playoffs
Adams Division Semifinals vs. (A4) Hartford Whalers – Bruins win 4–2

Game	Date	Visitor	Score	Home	Attendance	Record
1	April 3	Hartford Whalers	5–2	Boston Bruins	14,448	0–1
2	April 5	Hartford Whalers	3–4	Boston Bruins	14,448	1–1
3	April 7	Boston Bruins	6–3	Hartford Whalers	15,635	2–1
4	April 9	Boston Bruins	3–4	Hartford Whalers	14,198	2–2
5	April 11	Hartford Whalers	1–6	Boston Bruins	14,448	3–2
6	April 13	Boston Bruins	3–1	Hartford Whalers	15,635	4–2

Adams Division Finals vs. (A2) Montreal Canadiens – Bruins win 4–3

Game	Date	Visitor	Score	Home	Attendance	Record
1	April 17	Montreal Canadiens	1–2	Boston Bruins	14,448	1–0
2	April 19	Montreal Canadiens	4–3 (OT)	Boston Bruins	14,448	1–1
3	April 21	Boston Bruins	3–2	Montreal Canadiens	17,955	2–1
4	April 23	Boston Bruins	2–6	Montreal Canadiens	17,957	2–2
5	April 25	Montreal Canadiens	1–4	Boston Bruins	14,448	3–2
6	April 27	Boston Bruins	2–3 (OT)	Montreal Canadiens	17,955	3–3
7	April 29	Montreal Canadiens	1–2	Boston Bruins	14,448	4–3

Wales Conference Finals vs. (P1) Pittsburgh Penguins – Penguins win 4–2

Game	Date	Visitor	Score	Home	Attendance	Record
1	May 1	Pittsburgh Penguins	3–6	Boston Bruins	14,448	1–0
2	May 3	Pittsburgh Penguins	4–5 (OT)	Boston Bruins	14,448	2–0
3	May 5	Boston Bruins	1–4	Pittsburgh Penguins	16,164	2–1
4	May 7	Boston Bruins	1–4	Pittsburgh Penguins	16,164	2–2
5	May 9	Pittsburgh Penguins	7–2	Boston Bruins	14,448	2–3
6	May 11	Boston Bruins	3–5	Pittsburgh Penguins	16,164	2–4

Legend: Win Loss

== Player statistics ==
=== Regular season ===
Scoring

Player	Pos	GP	G	A	Pts	PIM	+/-	PPG	SHG	GWG
Ray Bourque	D	76	21	73	94	75	33	7	0	3
Craig Janney	C	77	26	66	92	8	15	9	1	5
Cam Neely	RW	69	51	40	91	98	26	18	1	8
Ken Hodge	C/RW	70	30	29	59	20	11	12	2	4
Dave Christian	RW	78	32	21	53	41	8	9	0	2
Bob Sweeney	C/RW	80	15	33	48	115	12	0	1	2
Glen Wesley	D	80	11	32	43	78	0	5	1	1
Randy Burridge	LW	62	15	13	28	40	17	1	0	4
Garry Galley	D	70	6	21	27	84	0	1	0	0
Jim Wiemer	D	61	4	19	23	62	3	0	0	1
Don Sweeney	D	77	8	13	21	67	2	0	1	3
Dave Poulin	C	31	8	12	20	25	5	0	2	0
Petri Skriko	RW	28	5	14	19	9	4	1	0	3
Jeff Lazaro	LW	49	5	13	18	67	7	1	1	1
Bobby Carpenter	C	29	8	8	16	22	2	2	0	0
Vladimir Ruzicka	C	29	8	8	16	19	1	4	0	0
Wes Walz	C	56	8	8	16	32	-14	1	0	1
Chris Nilan	RW	41	6	9	15	277	4	0	0	2
John Carter	LW	50	4	7	11	68	-13	1	1	2
Andy Brickley	LW/C	40	2	9	11	8	-4	0	0	0
Allen Pedersen	D	57	2	6	8	107	15	0	0	0
Stephane Quintal	D	45	2	6	8	89	2	1	0	0
Peter Douris	RW	39	5	2	7	9	-12	1	0	1
Graeme Townshend	RW	18	2	5	7	12	1	0	0	0
Nevin Markwart	LW	23	3	3	6	36	0	0	0	0
Ron Hoover	C	15	4	0	4	31	0	0	0	1
Lyndon Byers	RW	19	2	2	4	82	-2	0	0	0
John Byce	C	18	1	3	4	6	1	0	0	0
Ralph Barahona	C	3	2	1	3	0	2	0	0	0
Jarmo Kekäläinen	LW	16	2	1	3	6	0	0	0	0
Andy Moog	G	51	0	2	2	20	0	0	0	0
Ken Hammond	D	1	1	0	1	2	2	0	0	0
Bob Beers	D	16	0	1	1	10	-8	0	0	0
Matt DelGuidice	G	1	0	0	0	0	0	0	0	0
Norm Foster	G	3	0	0	0	0	0	0	0	0
Gord Kluzak	D	2	0	0	0	0	2	0	0	0
Rejean Lemelin	G	33	0	0	0	10	0	0	0	0
Bruce Shoebottom	D	1	0	0	0	5	-1	0	0	0
Shayne Stevenson	RW	14	0	0	0	26	-4	0	0	0

Goaltending

Player	MIN	GP	W	L	T	GA	GAA	SO	SA	SV	SV%
Andy Moog	2844	51	25	13	9	136	2.87	4	1307	1171	.896
Rejean Lemelin	1829	33	17	10	3	111	3.64	1	841	730	.868
Norm Foster	184	3	2	1	0	14	4.57	0	82	68	.829
Matt DelGuidice	10	1	0	0	0	0	0.00	0	7	7	1.000
Team:	4867	80	44	24	12	261	3.22	5	2237	1976	.883

=== Playoffs ===
Scoring

Player	Pos	GP	G	A	Pts	PIM	+/-	PPG	SHG	GWG
Ray Bourque	D	19	7	18	25	12	-4	3	0	0
Craig Janney	C	18	4	18	22	11	-4	4	0	0
Cam Neely	RW	19	16	4	20	36	-3	9	0	4
Vladimir Ruzicka	C	17	2	11	13	0	2	1	0	2
Dave Christian	RW	19	8	4	12	4	-2	0	0	2
Glen Wesley	D	19	2	9	11	19	-8	2	0	0
Ken Hodge	C/RW	15	4	6	10	6	-2	1	0	1
Dave Poulin	C	16	0	9	9	20	3	0	0	0
Petri Skriko	RW	18	4	4	8	4	-2	3	0	0
Bob Sweeney	C/RW	17	4	2	6	45	-5	0	0	1
Garry Galley	D	16	1	5	6	17	-2	0	0	0
Jeff Lazaro	LW	19	3	2	5	30	-2	0	0	0
Jim Wiemer	D	16	1	3	4	14	5	1	0	0
Don Sweeney	D	19	3	0	3	25	-3	0	0	0
Randy Burridge	LW	19	0	3	3	39	-5	0	0	0
Chris Nilan	RW	19	0	2	2	62	-2	0	0	0
Nevin Markwart	LW	12	1	0	1	22	-2	0	0	0
Bobby Carpenter	C	1	0	1	1	2	1	0	0	0
Peter Douris	RW	7	0	1	1	6	1	0	0	0
Stephane Quintal	D	3	0	1	1	7	0	0	0	0
Bob Beers	D	6	0	0	0	4	-1	0	0	0
Lyndon Byers	RW	1	0	0	0	10	-1	0	0	0
Ken Hammond	D	8	0	0	0	10	-5	0	0	0
Ron Hoover	C	8	0	0	0	18	-2	0	0	0
Rejean Lemelin	G	2	0	0	0	0	0	0	0	0
Andy Moog	G	19	0	0	0	4	0	0	0	0
Allen Pedersen	D	8	0	0	0	10	0	0	0	0
Wes Walz	C	2	0	0	0	0	-3	0	0	0
Chris Winnes	RW	1	0	0	0	0	-1	0	0	0

Goaltending

Player	MIN	GP	W	L	GA	GAA	SO	SA	SV	SV%
Andy Moog	1133	19	10	9	60	3.18	0	569	509	.895
Rejean Lemelin	32	2	0	0	0	0.00	0	18	18	1.000
Team:	1165	19	10	9	60	3.09	0	587	527	.898

Note:

Pos = Position;GP = Games played; G = Goals; A = Assists; Pts = Points; PIM = Penalty minutes; +/- = Plus/minus; PPG = Power-play goals; SHG = Short-handed goals; GWG = Game-winning goals
Pos = Position;GP = Games played; Min, TOI = Minutes played; W = Wins; L = Losses; T,T/OT = Ties; OTL = Overtime losses; GA = Goals-against; GAA = Goals-against average; SO = Shutouts; SA = Shots against; SV = Shots saved;SV% = Save percentage;
