= 1990–91 New York Islanders season =

NHL hockey team season

1990–91 New York Islanders
- Division: 6th Patrick
- Conference: 10th Wales
- 1990–91 record: 25–45–10
- Home record: 15–19–6
- Road record: 10–26–4
- Goals for: 223
- Goals against: 290

Team information
- General manager: Bill Torrey
- Coach: Al Arbour
- Captain: Brent Sutter
- Alternate captains: Pat LaFontaine; Unknown
- Arena: Nassau Coliseum

Team leaders
- Goals: Pat LaFontaine (41)
- Assists: Pat LaFontaine (44)
- Points: Pat LaFontaine (85)
- Penalty minutes: Ken Baumgartner (282)
- Plus/minus: Joe Reekie (+17)
- Wins: Glenn Healy (18)
- Goals against average: Mark Fitzpatrick (3.00)

The 1990–91 New York Islanders season was the 19th season for the franchise in the National Hockey League (NHL). The Islanders missed the playoffs for the first time since 1989 despite qualifying the previous year in the 1989–90 season.

== Regular season ==
The Islanders finished the regular-season last in scoring (223 goals for), tied the Quebec Nordiques for fewest power-play goals scored (51) and had the fewest power-play opportunities (317).

=== Final standings ===
Patrick Division
	GP	W	L	T	GF	GA	Pts
**Pittsburgh Penguins**	80	41	33	6	342	305	88
**New York Rangers**	80	36	31	13	297	265	85
**Washington Capitals**	80	37	36	7	258	258	81
**New Jersey Devils**	80	32	33	15	272	264	79
Philadelphia Flyers	80	33	37	10	252	267	76
New York Islanders	80	25	45	10	223	290	60

Note: GP = Games played, W = Wins, L = Losses, T = Ties, Pts = Points, GF = Goals for, GA = Goals against
Note: Teams that qualified for the playoffs are highlighted in bold.

Wales Conference
R		Div	GP	W	L	T	GF	GA	Pts
**1**	**Boston Bruins**	**ADM**	**80**	**44**	**24**	**12**	**299**	**264**	**100**
**2**	**Montreal Canadiens**	**ADM**	**80**	**39**	**30**	**11**	**273**	**249**	**89**
**3**	**Pittsburgh Penguins**	**PTK**	**80**	**41**	**33**	**6**	**342**	**305**	**88**
**4**	**New York Rangers**	**PTK**	**80**	**36**	**31**	**13**	**297**	**265**	**85**
**5**	**Washington Capitals**	**PTK**	**80**	**37**	**36**	**7**	**258**	**258**	**81**
**6**	**Buffalo Sabres**	**ADM**	**80**	**31**	**30**	**19**	**292**	**278**	**81**
**7**	**New Jersey Devils**	**PTK**	**80**	**32**	**33**	**15**	**272**	**264**	**79**
8	Philadelphia Flyers	PTK	80	33	37	10	252	267	76
**9**	**Hartford Whalers**	**ADM**	**80**	**31**	**38**	**11**	**238**	**276**	**73**
10	New York Islanders	PTK	80	25	45	10	223	290	60
11	Quebec Nordiques	ADM	80	16	50	14	236	354	46

Divisions: PTK – Patrick, ADM – Adams

bold – Qualified for playoffs

== Schedule and results ==
1990–91 regular season
October

Game	Result	Date	Score	Opponent	Record
1	L	October 4, 1990	1–4	@ Los Angeles Kings (1990–91)	0–1–0
2	L	October 6, 1990	2–4	@ Minnesota North Stars (1990–91)	0–2–0
3	W	October 7, 1990	4–2	@ Chicago Blackhawks (1990–91)	1–2–0
4	L	October 13, 1990	4–6	Pittsburgh Penguins (1990–91)	1–3–0
5	W	October 16, 1990	4–1	Winnipeg Jets (1990–91)	2–3–0
6	L	October 19, 1990	3–4	@ Washington Capitals (1990–91)	2–4–0
7	L	October 20, 1990	1–3	Buffalo Sabres (1990–91)	2–5–0
8	L	October 23, 1990	1–8	New Jersey Devils (1990–91)	2–6–0
9	L	October 24, 1990	2–8	@ Montreal Canadiens (1990–91)	2–7–0
10	W	October 27, 1990	5–2	Philadelphia Flyers (1990–91)	3–7–0
11	L	October 28, 1990	3–8	@ Pittsburgh Penguins (1990–91)	3–8–0
12	L	October 30, 1990	1–4	Los Angeles Kings (1990–91)	3–9–0

November

Game	Result	Date	Score	Opponent	Record
13	W	November 2, 1990	3–2	@ New York Rangers (1990–91)	4–9–0
14	L	November 3, 1990	2–5	Washington Capitals (1990–91)	4–10–0
15	W	November 6, 1990	4–3	Toronto Maple Leafs (1990–91)	5–10–0
16	W	November 7, 1990	6–3	@ New Jersey Devils (1990–91)	6–10–0
17	W	November 10, 1990	5–1	Calgary Flames (1990–91)	7–10–0
18	W	November 15, 1990	4–3 OT	@ Calgary Flames (1990–91)	8–10–0
19	L	November 16, 1990	2–3	@ Vancouver Canucks (1990–91)	8–11–0
20	L	November 18, 1990	1–3	@ Edmonton Oilers (1990–91)	8–12–0
21	W	November 22, 1990	3–1	Winnipeg Jets (1990–91)	9–12–0
22	T	November 24, 1990	2–2 OT	New York Rangers (1990–91)	9–12–1
23	L	November 25, 1990	1–4	@ Philadelphia Flyers (1990–91)	9–13–1
24	L	November 27, 1990	1–5	Philadelphia Flyers (1990–91)	9–14–1
25	T	November 30, 1990	5–5 OT	@ New Jersey Devils (1990–91)	9–14–2

December

Game	Result	Date	Score	Opponent	Record
26	L	December 1, 1990	1–3	Washington Capitals (1990–91)	9–15–2
27	L	December 4, 1990	2–4	Vancouver Canucks (1990–91)	9–16–2
28	L	December 6, 1990	2–5	@ Chicago Blackhawks (1990–91)	9–17–2
29	W	December 11, 1990	3–2	New Jersey Devils (1990–91)	10–17–2
30	T	December 13, 1990	2–2 OT	@ Philadelphia Flyers (1990–91)	10–17–3
31	W	December 15, 1990	7–2	@ Quebec Nordiques (1990–91)	11–17–3
32	T	December 18, 1990	2–2 OT	Toronto Maple Leafs (1990–91)	11–17–4
33	W	December 20, 1990	4–2	Hartford Whalers (1990–91)	12–17–4
34	L	December 22, 1990	3–4	Pittsburgh Penguins (1990–91)	12–18–4
35	W	December 23, 1990	4–3 OT	@ Pittsburgh Penguins (1990–91)	13–18–4
36	T	December 27, 1990	1–1 OT	@ New Jersey Devils (1990–91)	13–18–5
37	L	December 29, 1990	1–3	Chicago Blackhawks (1990–91)	13–19–5
38	W	December 31, 1990	6–3	Quebec Nordiques (1990–91)	14–19–5

January

Game	Result	Date	Score	Opponent	Record
39	L	January 2, 1991	4–5	@ Buffalo Sabres (1990–91)	14–20–5
40	L	January 3, 1991	3–6	Los Angeles Kings (1990–91)	14–21–5
41	W	January 5, 1991	3–2	Philadelphia Flyers (1990–91)	15–21–5
42	L	January 8, 1991	0–3	Minnesota North Stars (1990–91)	15–22–5
43	L	January 9, 1991	3–4 OT	@ Montreal Canadiens (1990–91)	15–23–5
44	T	January 12, 1991	2–2 OT	Detroit Red Wings (1990–91)	15–23–6
45	W	January 13, 1991	4–3	@ Quebec Nordiques (1990–91)	16–23–6
46	L	January 15, 1991	4–5	Boston Bruins (1990–91)	16–24–6
47	L	January 17, 1991	1–6	Edmonton Oilers (1990–91)	16–25–6
48	W	January 22, 1991	3–2	New York Rangers (1990–91)	17–25–6
49	L	January 25, 1991	1–8	@ Winnipeg Jets (1990–91)	17–26–6
50	L	January 27, 1991	4–5 OT	@ Washington Capitals (1990–91)	17–27–6
51	W	January 29, 1991	8–1	@ Hartford Whalers (1990–91)	18–27–6
52	L	January 31, 1991	3–4 OT	Washington Capitals (1990–91)	18–28–6

February

Game	Result	Date	Score	Opponent	Record
53	T	February 2, 1991	3–3 OT	Montreal Canadiens (1990–91)	18–28–7
54	T	February 3, 1991	1–1 OT	Hartford Whalers (1990–91)	18–28–8
55	L	February 6, 1991	2–5	@ New York Rangers (1990–91)	18–29–8
56	L	February 8, 1991	4–8	@ Detroit Red Wings (1990–91)	18–30–8
57	L	February 9, 1991	2–3	@ Toronto Maple Leafs (1990–91)	18–31–8
58	W	February 12, 1991	5–4	Minnesota North Stars (1990–91)	19–31–8
59	L	February 14, 1991	2–5	@ Pittsburgh Penguins (1990–91)	19–32–8
60	W	February 16, 1991	4–3	Pittsburgh Penguins (1990–91)	20–32–8
61	W	February 18, 1991	5–4	@ New York Rangers (1990–91)	21–32–8
62	L	February 21, 1991	2–7	@ St. Louis Blues (1990–91)	21–33–8
63	L	February 23, 1991	3–5	Philadelphia Flyers (1990–91)	21–34–8
64	L	February 24, 1991	3–4	@ Philadelphia Flyers (1990–91)	21–35–8
65	T	February 26, 1991	1–1 OT	Buffalo Sabres (1990–91)	21–35–9
66	L	February 28, 1991	0–5	@ Boston Bruins (1990–91)	21–36–9

March

Game	Result	Date	Score	Opponent	Record
67	L	March 2, 1991	2–3	@ Washington Capitals (1990–91)	21–37–9
68	W	March 5, 1991	4–3	New Jersey Devils (1990–91)	22–37–9
69	L	March 7, 1991	0–2	@ Detroit Red Wings (1990–91)	22–38–9
70	W	March 9, 1991	6–4	New York Rangers (1990–91)	23–38–9
71	L	March 10, 1991	3–4	Pittsburgh Penguins (1990–91)	23–39–9
72	L	March 13, 1991	1–2	@ Edmonton Oilers (1990–91)	23–40–9
73	L	March 14, 1991	2–4	@ Calgary Flames (1990–91)	23–41–9
74	T	March 16, 1991	4–4 OT	@ Vancouver Canucks (1990–91)	23–41–10
75	L	March 21, 1991	2–6	Washington Capitals (1990–91)	23–42–10
76	L	March 23, 1991	2–3	St. Louis Blues (1990–91)	23–43–10
77	L	March 24, 1991	1–3	@ New York Rangers (1990–91)	23–44–10
78	L	March 28, 1991	0–3	@ St. Louis Blues (1990–91)	23–45–10
79	W	March 30, 1991	5–3	Boston Bruins (1990–91)	24–45–10
80	W	March 31, 1991	3–2	@ New Jersey Devils (1990–91)	25–45–10

Legend: Win (2 points) Loss (0 points) Tie (1 point)

== Player statistics ==
Regular season
Scoring

Player	Pos	GP	G	A	Pts	PIM	+/-	PPG	SHG	GWG
Pat LaFontaine	C	75	41	44	85	42	-6	12	2	5
David Volek	W	77	22	34	56	57	-10	6	0	1
Brent Sutter	C	75	21	32	53	49	-8	6	2	4
Pat Flatley	RW	56	20	25	45	74	-2	8	0	4
Derek King	LW	66	19	26	45	44	1	2	0	2
Randy Wood	LW/C	76	24	18	42	45	-12	6	1	3
Ray Ferraro	C	61	19	16	35	52	-11	5	0	1
Jeff Norton	D	44	3	25	28	16	-13	2	1	0
Bill Berg	LW	78	9	14	23	67	-3	0	0	0
Gary Nylund	D	72	2	21	23	105	-8	0	0	0
Wayne McBean	D	52	5	14	19	47	-21	2	0	0
Joe Reekie	D	66	3	16	19	96	17	0	0	2
Brad Dalgarno	RW	41	3	12	15	24	-10	0	0	1
Dave Chyzowski	LW	56	5	9	14	61	-19	0	0	0
Hubie McDonough	C	52	6	6	12	10	-14	0	1	0
Brad Lauer	LW	44	4	8	12	45	-6	0	1	0
Tom Fitzgerald	RW	41	5	5	10	24	-9	0	0	2
Craig Ludwig	D	75	1	8	9	77	-24	0	0	0
John Tucker	C	20	3	4	7	4	-1	1	0	0
Ken Baumgartner	LW	78	1	6	7	282	-14	0	0	0
Doug Crossman	D	16	1	6	7	12	-4	1	0	0
Mick Vukota	RW	60	2	4	6	238	-13	0	0	0
Rich Pilon	D	60	1	4	5	126	-12	0	0	0
Don Maloney	LW	12	0	5	5	6	-3	0	0	0
Greg Parks	C	20	1	2	3	4	0	0	0	0
Dean Chynoweth	D	25	1	1	2	59	-6	0	0	0
Paul Guay	RW	3	0	2	2	2	2	0	0	0
Glenn Healy	G	53	0	2	2	14	0	0	0	0
Richard Kromm	LW	6	1	0	1	0	-2	0	1	0
Jari Gronstrand	D	3	0	1	1	2	-2	0	0	0
Shawn Byram	LW	4	0	0	0	14	-2	0	0	0
Rob DiMaio	RW	1	0	0	0	0	0	0	0	0
Jeff Finley	D	11	0	0	0	4	-1	0	0	0
Mark Fitzpatrick	G	2	0	0	0	0	0	0	0	0
Jeff Hackett	G	30	0	0	0	4	0	0	0	0
Alan Kerr	RW	2	0	0	0	5	0	0	0	0
Derek Laxdal	RW	4	0	0	0	0	-1	0	0	0
Danny Lorenz	G	2	0	0	0	0	0	0	0	0
George Maneluk	G	4	0	0	0	2	0	0	0	0
Scott Scissons	C	1	0	0	0	0	0	0	0	0
Dennis Vaske	D	5	0	0	0	2	4	0	0	0

Goaltending

Player	MIN	GP	W	L	T	GA	GAA	SO	SA	SV	SV%
Glenn Healy	2999	53	18	24	9	166	3.32	0	1557	1391	.893
Jeff Hackett	1508	30	5	18	1	91	3.62	0	741	650	.877
Mark Fitzpatrick	120	2	1	1	0	6	3.00	0	60	54	.900
George Maneluk	140	4	1	1	0	15	6.43	0	94	79	.840
Danny Lorenz	80	2	0	1	0	5	3.75	0	36	31	.861
Team:	4847	80	25	45	10	283	3.50	0	2488	2205	.886

Note: Pos = Position; GP = Games played; G = Goals; A = Assists; Pts = Points; +/- = plus/minus; PIM = Penalty minutes; PPG = Power-play goals; SHG = Short-handed goals; GWG = Game-winning goals
MIN = Minutes played; W = Wins; L = Losses; T = Ties; GA = Goals-against; GAA = Goals-against average; SO = Shutouts; SA = Shots against; SV = Shots saved; SV% = Save percentage;

== Draft picks ==
New York's draft picks at the 1990 NHL entry draft held at the BC Place in Vancouver, British Columbia.

Round	#	Player	Nationality	College/Junior/Club team (League)
1	6	Scott Scissons	Canada	Saskatoon Blades (WHL)
2	27	Chris Taylor	Canada	London Knights (OHL)
3	48	Dan Plante	United States	Edina High School (USHS-MN)
4	69	Jeff Nielsen	United States	Grand Rapids High School (USHS-MN)
5	90	Chris Marinucci	United States	Grand Rapids High School (USHS-MN)
6	111	Joni Lehto	Finland	Ottawa 67's (OHL)
7	132	Mike Guilbert	United States	Governor Dummer Academy (USHS-MA)
8	153	Sylvain Fleury	Canada	Longueuil Collège Français (QJHL)
9	174	John Joyce	United States	Avon Old Farms (USHS-CT)
10	195	R. J. Enga	Canada	Culver Military Academy (USHS-IN)
11	216	Martin Lacroix	Canada	St. Lawrence University (ECAC)
12	237	Andrew Shier	United States	Detroit Junior Red Wings (OHL)
S	11	Brandon Reed	United States	Lake Superior State University (CCHA)

== See also ==
- 1990–91 NHL season
