= Maneluk =

Maneluk is a surname. Notable people with the surname include:

- George Maneluk (born 1967), Canadian ice hockey player
- Mike Maneluk (born 1973), Canadian ice hockey player
