= 1990–91 Los Angeles Kings season =

National Hockey League team season

1990–91 Los Angeles Kings
- Smythe Division champions
- Division: 1st Smythe
- Conference: 3rd Campbell
- 1990–91 record: 46–24–10
- Home record: 26–9–5
- Road record: 20–15–5
- Goals for: 340
- Goals against: 254

Team information
- General manager: Rogatien Vachon
- Coach: Tom Webster
- Captain: Wayne Gretzky
- Alternate captains: Larry Robinson; Dave Taylor
- Arena: Great Western Forum

Team leaders
- Goals: Luc Robitaille and Tomas Sandstrom (45)
- Assists: Wayne Gretzky (122)
- Points: Wayne Gretzky (163)
- Penalty minutes: Jay Miller (259)
- Plus/minus: Marty McSorley (+48)
- Wins: Kelly Hrudey (26)
- Goals against average: Kelly Hrudey (2.90)

The 1990–91 Los Angeles Kings season, was the Kings' 24th season in the National Hockey League (NHL). It saw the Kings finish first in the Smythe Division with a 46–24–10 record for 102 points. This was the first (and as of 2025, only) regular season division title in Kings history. It also served as the second-best regular-season finish in franchise history. The team defeated the Vancouver Canucks in the Smythe Division Semifinals in six games before falling to the Edmonton Oilers in the Division Finals in six games.

== Offseason ==
=== NHL draft ===
Los Angeles's draft picks at the 1990 NHL entry draft held at the BC Place in Vancouver, British Columbia.

Round	#	Player	Nationality	College/Junior/Club team (League)
1	7	Darryl Sydor	Canada	Kamloops Blazers (WHL)
2	28	Brandy Semchuk	Canada	Canadian National Team
3	49	Bob Berg	Canada	Belleville Bulls (OHL)
5	91	David Goverde	Canada	Sudbury Wolves (OHL)
6	112	Erik Andersson	Sweden	Danderyds HC (Sweden)
7	133	Robert Lang	Czechoslovakia	HC CHZ Litvinov (Czechoslovakia)
8	154	Dean Hulett	United States	Lake Superior State University (CCHA)
9	175	Denis LeBlanc	Canada	Saint-Hyacinthe Laser (QMJHL)
10	196	Patrik Ross	Sweden	HV71 (Sweden)
11	217	Kevin White	Canada	Windsor Spitfires (OHL)
12	238	Troy Mohns	Canada	Colgate University (ECAC)
S	12	Peter Sentner	United States	University of Massachusetts Lowell (Hockey East)

== Regular season ==
=== Final standings ===
Smythe Division
	GP	W	L	T	GF	GA	Pts
**Los Angeles Kings**	80	46	24	10	340	254	102
**Calgary Flames**	80	46	26	8	344	263	100
**Edmonton Oilers**	80	37	37	6	272	272	80
**Vancouver Canucks**	80	28	43	9	243	315	65
Winnipeg Jets	80	26	43	11	260	288	63

Note: GP = Games played, W = Wins, L = Losses, T = Ties, Pts = Points, GF = Goals for, GA = Goals against
Note: Teams that qualified for the playoffs are highlighted in bold.

Campbell Conference
R		Div	GP	W	L	T	GF	GA	Pts
**1**	**p – Chicago Blackhawks**	**NRS**	**80**	**49**	**23**	**8**	**284**	**211**	**106**
**2**	**St. Louis Blues**	**NRS**	**80**	**47**	**22**	**11**	**310**	**250**	**105**
**3**	**Los Angeles Kings**	**SMY**	**80**	**46**	**24**	**10**	**340**	**254**	**102**
**4**	**Calgary Flames**	**SMY**	**80**	**46**	**26**	**8**	**344**	**263**	**100**
**5**	**Edmonton Oilers**	**SMY**	**80**	**37**	**37**	**6**	**272**	**272**	**80**
**6**	**Detroit Red Wings**	**NRS**	**80**	**34**	**38**	**8**	**273**	**298**	**76**
**7**	**Minnesota North Stars**	**NRS**	**80**	**27**	**39**	**14**	**256**	**266**	**68**
**8**	**Vancouver Canucks**	**SMY**	**80**	**28**	**43**	**9**	**243**	**315**	**65**
9	Winnipeg Jets	SMY	80	26	43	11	260	288	63
10	Toronto Maple Leafs	NRS	80	23	46	11	241	318	57

Divisions: NRS – Norris, SMY – Smythe

bold – Qualified for playoffs; p – Won Presidents' Trophy

== Schedule and results ==
1990–91 regular season
October

Game	Result	Date	Score	Opponent	Record
1	W	October 4, 1990	4–1	New York Islanders (1990–91)	1–0–0
2	L	October 6, 1990	3–6	Vancouver Canucks (1990–91)	1–1–0
3	W	October 9, 1990	6–2	@ Vancouver Canucks (1990–91)	2–1–0
4	T	October 11, 1990	5–5 OT	Edmonton Oilers (1990–91)	2–1–1
5	W	October 13, 1990	7–1	Boston Bruins (1990–91)	3–1–1
6	W	October 14, 1990	4–1	St. Louis Blues (1990–91)	4–1–1
7	W	October 17, 1990	5–2	Minnesota North Stars (1990–91)	5–1–1
8	W	October 19, 1990	5–2	Hartford Whalers (1990–91)	6–1–1
9	W	October 23, 1990	6–4	Calgary Flames (1990–91)	7–1–1
10	L	October 26, 1990	2–6	@ Winnipeg Jets (1990–91)	7–2–1
11	W	October 28, 1990	6–2	@ Winnipeg Jets (1990–91)	8–2–1
12	W	October 30, 1990	4–1	@ New York Islanders (1990–91)	9–2–1
13	L	October 31, 1990	4–9	@ New York Rangers (1990–91)	9–3–1

November

Game	Result	Date	Score	Opponent	Record
14	L	November 2, 1990	3–4	@ Washington Capitals (1990–91)	9–4–1
15	W	November 4, 1990	2–0	@ Chicago Blackhawks (1990–91)	10–4–1
16	W	November 8, 1990	5–1	Detroit Red Wings (1990–91)	11–4–1
17	W	November 10, 1990	7–4	Edmonton Oilers (1990–91)	12–4–1
18	W	November 14, 1990	4–2	Buffalo Sabres (1990–91)	13–4–1
19	W	November 17, 1990	2–1 OT	Pittsburgh Penguins (1990–91)	14–4–1
20	W	November 20, 1990	5–4	New Jersey Devils (1990–91)	15–4–1
21	L	November 22, 1990	3–6	@ Calgary Flames (1990–91)	15–5–1
22	W	November 24, 1990	4–2	@ Montreal Canadiens (1990–91)	16–5–1
23	T	November 25, 1990	4–4 OT	@ Quebec Nordiques (1990–91)	16–5–2
24	L	November 27, 1990	3–4	@ Detroit Red Wings (1990–91)	16–6–2
25	T	November 29, 1990	4–4 OT	@ St. Louis Blues (1990–91)	16–6–3

December

Game	Result	Date	Score	Opponent	Record
26	L	December 1, 1990	3–4	Toronto Maple Leafs (1990–91)	16–7–3
27	T	December 5, 1990	3–3 OT	Winnipeg Jets (1990–91)	16–7–4
28	T	December 8, 1990	4–4 OT	Winnipeg Jets (1990–91)	16–7–5
29	L	December 11, 1990	4–6	New York Rangers (1990–91)	16–8–5
30	L	December 13, 1990	1–4	Calgary Flames (1990–91)	16–9–5
31	W	December 15, 1990	8–3	Edmonton Oilers (1990–91)	17–9–5
32	L	December 18, 1990	3–4	@ Edmonton Oilers (1990–91)	17–10–5
33	W	December 20, 1990	4–3 OT	@ Calgary Flames (1990–91)	18–10–5
34	L	December 22, 1990	3–4	@ Vancouver Canucks (1990–91)	18–11–5
35	L	December 27, 1990	5–7	Philadelphia Flyers (1990–91)	18–12–5
36	L	December 29, 1990	2–3	Montreal Canadiens (1990–91)	18–13–5
37	W	December 31, 1990	4–2	@ Minnesota North Stars (1990–91)	19–13–5

January

Game	Result	Date	Score	Opponent	Record
38	L	January 2, 1991	1–4	@ New York Rangers (1990–91)	19–14–5
39	W	January 3, 1991	6–3	@ New York Islanders (1990–91)	20–14–5
40	W	January 5, 1991	4–2	@ Toronto Maple Leafs (1990–91)	21–14–5
41	W	January 6, 1991	3–1	@ Chicago Blackhawks (1990–91)	22–14–5
42	W	January 8, 1991	4–3 OT	Hartford Whalers (1990–91)	23–14–5
43	W	January 10, 1991	5–2	Buffalo Sabres (1990–91)	24–14–5
44	W	January 12, 1991	6–2	Vancouver Canucks (1990–91)	25–14–5
45	W	January 14, 1991	6–1	@ New Jersey Devils (1990–91)	26–14–5
46	L	January 16, 1991	3–4	@ Hartford Whalers (1990–91)	26–15–5
47	L	January 17, 1991	3–5	@ Boston Bruins (1990–91)	26–16–5
48	L	January 22, 1991	2–4	@ Edmonton Oilers (1990–91)	26–17–5
49	W	January 25, 1991	5–1	@ Vancouver Canucks (1990–91)	27–17–5
50	W	January 26, 1991	5–4	Vancouver Canucks (1990–91)	28–17–5
51	L	January 30, 1991	2–4	New Jersey Devils (1990–91)	28–18–5

February

Game	Result	Date	Score	Opponent	Record
52	W	February 2, 1991	9–1	Vancouver Canucks (1990–91)	29–18–5
53	W	February 4, 1991	6–4	@ Detroit Red Wings (1990–91)	30–18–5
54	W	February 5, 1991	3–2	@ Philadelphia Flyers (1990–91)	31–18–5
55	T	February 8, 1991	4–4 OT	@ Buffalo Sabres (1990–91)	31–18–6
56	L	February 9, 1991	4–5	@ St. Louis Blues (1990–91)	31–19–6
57	T	February 12, 1991	4–4 OT	Calgary Flames (1990–91)	31–19–7
58	W	February 14, 1991	4–2	@ Edmonton Oilers (1990–91)	32–19–7
59	L	February 16, 1991	4–5 OT	Boston Bruins (1990–91)	32–20–7
60	W	February 18, 1991	5–2	Washington Capitals (1990–91)	33–20–7
61	W	February 20, 1991	6–1	Quebec Nordiques (1990–91)	34–20–7
62	W	February 22, 1991	6–4	@ Winnipeg Jets (1990–91)	35–20–7
63	W	February 24, 1991	5–3	@ Winnipeg Jets (1990–91)	36–20–7
64	W	February 26, 1991	8–2	Pittsburgh Penguins (1990–91)	37–20–7
65	W	February 28, 1991	4–2	Winnipeg Jets (1990–91)	38–20–7

March

Game	Result	Date	Score	Opponent	Record
66	W	March 2, 1991	6–3	Winnipeg Jets (1990–91)	39–20–7
67	T	March 5, 1991	3–3 OT	@ Washington Capitals (1990–91)	39–20–8
68	L	March 7, 1991	2–3	@ Pittsburgh Penguins (1990–91)	39–21–8
69	W	March 9, 1991	3–0	@ Quebec Nordiques (1990–91)	40–21–8
70	T	March 10, 1991	4–4 OT	@ Montreal Canadiens (1990–91)	40–21–9
71	W	March 12, 1991	6–0	Philadelphia Flyers (1990–91)	41–21–9
72	L	March 14, 1991	3–6	Chicago Blackhawks (1990–91)	41–22–9
73	W	March 16, 1991	4–3	@ Calgary Flames (1990–91)	42–22–9
74	L	March 17, 1991	4–5 OT	@ Vancouver Canucks (1990–91)	42–23–9
75	T	March 20, 1991	4–4 OT	Toronto Maple Leafs (1990–91)	42–23–10
76	W	March 23, 1991	8–4	Calgary Flames (1990–91)	43–23–10
77	W	March 24, 1991	4–3 OT	@ Edmonton Oilers (1990–91)	44–23–10
78	W	March 26, 1991	2–0	Edmonton Oilers (1990–91)	45–23–10
79	W	March 28, 1991	6–5	Minnesota North Stars (1990–91)	46–23–10
80	L	March 31, 1991	3–5	@ Calgary Flames (1990–91)	46–24–10

Legend: Win (2 points) Loss (0 points) Tie (1 point)

== Playoffs ==
=== Round 1: (S1) Los Angeles Kings vs. (S4) Vancouver Canucks ===
April 4	Vancouver Canucks	6–5	Los Angeles Kings	Great Western Forum

April 6	Vancouver Canucks	2–3	OT	Los Angeles Kings	Great Western Forum

April 8	Los Angeles Kings	1–2	OT	Vancouver Canucks	Pacific Coliseum

April 10	Los Angeles Kings	6–1	Vancouver Canucks	Pacific Coliseum

April 12	Vancouver Canucks	4–7	Los Angeles Kings	Great Western Forum

April 14	Los Angeles Kings	4–1	Vancouver Canucks	Pacific Coliseum

Los Angeles won series 4–2

=== Round 2: (S1) Los Angeles Kings vs. (S3) Edmonton Oilers ===
April 18	Edmonton Oilers	3–4	OT	Los Angeles Kings	Great Western Forum

April 20	Edmonton Oilers	4–3	2OT	Los Angeles Kings	Great Western Forum

April 22	Los Angeles Kings	3–4	2OT	Edmonton Oilers	Northlands Coliseum

April 24	Los Angeles Kings	2–4	Edmonton Oilers	Northlands Coliseum

April 26	Edmonton Oilers	2–5	Los Angeles Kings	Great Western Forum

April 28	Los Angeles Kings	3–4	OT	Edmonton Oilers	Northlands Coliseum

Edmonton won series 4–2

== Player statistics ==
Regular season
Scoring

Player	Pos	GP	G	A	Pts	PIM	+/-	PPG	SHG	GWG
Wayne Gretzky	C	78	41	122	163	16	30	8	0	5
Luc Robitaille	LW	76	45	46	91	68	28	11	0	5
Tomas Sandstrom	RW	68	45	44	89	106	27	16	0	6
Tony Granato	RW	68	30	34	64	154	22	11	1	3
Steve Duchesne	D	78	21	41	62	66	19	8	0	3
Todd Elik	C	74	21	37	58	58	20	2	0	4
Dave Taylor	RW	73	23	30	53	148	27	6	0	2
Rob Blake	D	75	12	34	46	125	3	9	0	2
Marty McSorley	D	61	7	32	39	221	48	1	1	1
Bob Kudelski	RW	72	23	13	36	46	9	2	3	3
Brian Benning	D	61	7	24	31	127	12	2	0	1
John Tonelli	LW	71	14	16	30	49	3	2	0	5
Steve Kasper	C	67	9	19	28	33	3	0	1	1
Larry Robinson	D	62	1	22	23	16	22	0	0	0
Brad Jones	LW	53	9	11	20	57	11	0	1	1
Jay Miller	LW	66	8	12	20	259	9	1	0	0
John McIntyre	C	56	8	5	13	115	6	0	1	0
Mike Donnelly	LW	53	7	5	12	41	3	0	0	2
Rod Buskas	D	57	3	8	11	182	14	0	0	0
Scott Bjugstad	RW	31	2	4	6	12	-5	0	0	1
Mike Krushelnyski	LW/C	15	1	5	6	10	7	1	0	0
Francois Breault	RW	17	1	4	5	6	-1	0	0	0
Bob Halkidis	D	34	1	3	4	133	8	0	0	0
Tim Watters	D	45	0	4	4	92	7	0	0	0
Jim Thomson	RW	8	1	0	1	19	0	0	0	1
Rene Chapdelaine	D	3	0	1	1	10	1	0	0	0
Sylvain Couturier	C	3	0	1	1	0	0	0	0	0
Daniel Berthiaume	G	37	0	0	0	10	0	0	0	0
Rick Hayward	D	4	0	0	0	5	0	0	0	0
Kelly Hrudey	G	47	0	0	0	14	0	0	0	0
Ilkka Sinisalo	RW	7	0	0	0	2	4	0	0	0
Dennis Smith	D	4	0	0	0	4	3	0	0	0

Goaltending

Player	MIN	GP	W	L	T	GA	GAA	SO	SA	SV	SV%
Kelly Hrudey	2730	47	26	13	6	132	2.90	3	1321	1189	.900
Daniel Berthiaume	2119	37	20	11	4	117	3.31	1	1086	969	.892
Team:	4849	80	46	24	10	249	3.08	4	2407	2158	.897

Playoffs
Scoring

Player	Pos	GP	G	A	Pts	PIM	+/-	PPG	SHG	GWG
Luc Robitaille	LW	12	12	4	16	22	-2	5	0	2
Wayne Gretzky	C	12	4	11	15	2	0	1	0	2
Steve Duchesne	D	12	4	8	12	8	7	1	0	0
Steve Kasper	C	10	4	6	10	8	4	0	1	0
Mike Donnelly	LW	12	5	4	9	6	6	0	0	0
Todd Elik	C	12	2	7	9	6	0	0	0	0
Tomas Sandstrom	RW	10	4	4	8	14	1	3	0	0
John Tonelli	LW	12	2	4	6	12	1	1	0	0
Bob Kudelski	RW	8	3	2	5	2	4	0	0	0
Rob Blake	D	12	1	4	5	26	-1	1	0	0
Tony Granato	RW	12	1	4	5	28	1	0	0	0
Larry Robinson	D	12	1	4	5	15	7	0	0	0
Brian Benning	D	12	0	5	5	6	1	0	0	0
Dave Taylor	RW	12	2	1	3	12	-3	0	0	1
Brad Jones	LW	8	1	1	2	2	2	0	0	1
Rod Buskas	D	2	0	2	2	22	2	0	0	0
John McIntyre	C	12	0	1	1	24	-2	0	0	0
Ilkka Sinisalo	RW	2	0	1	1	0	1	0	0	0
Scott Bjugstad	RW	2	0	0	0	0	0	0	0	0
Bob Halkidis	D	3	0	0	0	0	-2	0	0	0
Kelly Hrudey	G	12	0	0	0	2	0	0	0	0
Marty McSorley	D	12	0	0	0	58	-1	0	0	0
Jay Miller	LW	8	0	0	0	17	-1	0	0	0
Tim Watters	D	7	0	0	0	12	-4	0	0	0

Goaltending

Player	MIN	GP	W	L	GA	GAA	SO	SA	SV	SV%
Kelly Hrudey	798	12	6	6	37	2.78	0	382	345	.903
Team:	798	12	6	6	37	2.78	0	382	345	.903

Note:

Pos = Position;GP = Games played; G = Goals; A = Assists; Pts = Points; PIM = Penalty minutes; +/- = Plus/minus; PPG = Power-play goals; SHG = Short-handed goals; GWG = Game-winning goals
Pos = Position;GP = Games played; Min, TOI = Minutes played; W = Wins; L = Losses; T,T/OT = Ties; OTL = Overtime losses; GA = Goals-against; GAA = Goals-against average; SO = Shutouts; SA = Shots against; SV = Shots saved;SV% = Save percentage;

== Awards and records ==
- Wayne Gretzky, Art Ross Trophy
- Wayne Gretzky, Longest Consecutive Games Assist Streak, 23 games (48 assists during the streak)
- Marty McSorley, NHL Plus-Minus Award
- Dave Taylor, Masterton Trophy Winner
- Tom Webster, runner-up for the Jack Adams Trophy

== Transactions ==
The Kings were involved in the following transactions during the 1990–91 season.

=== Trades ===
August 15, 1990	To Los Angeles Kings Shawn McCosh	To Detroit Red Wings 8th round pick in 1992 - Justin Krall
September 6, 1990	To Los Angeles Kings Daniel Berthiaume	To Minnesota North Stars Craig Duncanson
September 30, 1990	To Los Angeles Kings Mike Donnelly	To Buffalo Sabres Mikko Mäkelä
November 9, 1990	To Los Angeles Kings John McIntyre	To Toronto Maple Leafs Mike Krushelnyski
March 5, 1991	To Los Angeles Kings Ilkka Sinisalo	To Minnesota North Stars 8th round pick in 1991 - Michael Burkett

=== Free agent signings ===
July 1, 1990	From Hartford Whalers Tom Martin
July 2, 1990	From New Jersey Devils Jim Thomson
July 11, 1990	From Montreal Canadiens Stéphane Richer
July 11, 1990	From Boston Bruins Billy O'Dwyer
July 15, 1990	From Calgary Flames Rick Hayward
July 16, 1990	From Edmonton Oilers Steve Graves
July 27, 1990	From Boston Bruins Brian Lawton
September 28, 1990	From Washington Capitals Dennis Smith
April 5, 1991	From Boston University (HE) Peter Ahola

=== Free agents lost ===
July 11, 1990	To New York Rangers Eric Germain

=== Waivers ===
October 1, 1990	From Pittsburgh Penguins Rod Buskas
