= 1990–91 Washington Capitals season =

NHL hockey team season

1990–91 Washington Capitals
- Division: 3rd Patrick
- Conference: 6th Wales
- 1990–91 record: 37–36–7
- Home record: 21–14–5
- Road record: 16–22–2
- Goals for: 258
- Goals against: 258

Team information
- General manager: David Poile
- Coach: Terry Murray
- Captain: Rod Langway
- Alternate captains: Kevin Hatcher; Dale Hunter
- Arena: Capital Centre

Team leaders
- Goals: Kevin Hatcher; Kelly Miller (24)
- Assists: Kevin Hatcher; Michal Pivonka (50)
- Points: Kevin Hatcher (74)
- Penalty minutes: Alan May (264)
- Plus/minus: Rod Langway (+12)
- Wins: Don Beaupre (20)
- Goals against average: Don Beaupre (2.64)

The 1990–91 Washington Capitals season was the Washington Capitals 17th season in the National Hockey League (NHL).

== Offseason ==
The Capitals acquired Peter Zezel from St. Louis for Geoff Courtnall as their main move during the offseason.

== Regular season ==
The Capitals had the best penalty-killing unit during the regular season, allowing the fewest power-play goals (44) and finishing with the NHL's best penalty-killing percentage (85.99%).

=== Final standings ===
Patrick Division
	GP	W	L	T	GF	GA	Pts
**Pittsburgh Penguins**	80	41	33	6	342	305	88
**New York Rangers**	80	36	31	13	297	265	85
**Washington Capitals**	80	37	36	7	258	258	81
**New Jersey Devils**	80	32	33	15	272	264	79
Philadelphia Flyers	80	33	37	10	252	267	76
New York Islanders	80	25	45	10	223	290	60

Note: GP = Games played, W = Wins, L = Losses, T = Ties, Pts = Points, GF = Goals for, GA = Goals against
Note: Teams that qualified for the playoffs are highlighted in bold.

Wales Conference
R		Div	GP	W	L	T	GF	GA	Pts
**1**	**Boston Bruins**	**ADM**	**80**	**44**	**24**	**12**	**299**	**264**	**100**
**2**	**Montreal Canadiens**	**ADM**	**80**	**39**	**30**	**11**	**273**	**249**	**89**
**3**	**Pittsburgh Penguins**	**PTK**	**80**	**41**	**33**	**6**	**342**	**305**	**88**
**4**	**New York Rangers**	**PTK**	**80**	**36**	**31**	**13**	**297**	**265**	**85**
**5**	**Washington Capitals**	**PTK**	**80**	**37**	**36**	**7**	**258**	**258**	**81**
**6**	**Buffalo Sabres**	**ADM**	**80**	**31**	**30**	**19**	**292**	**278**	**81**
**7**	**New Jersey Devils**	**PTK**	**80**	**32**	**33**	**15**	**272**	**264**	**79**
8	Philadelphia Flyers	PTK	80	33	37	10	252	267	76
**9**	**Hartford Whalers**	**ADM**	**80**	**31**	**38**	**11**	**238**	**276**	**73**
10	New York Islanders	PTK	80	25	45	10	223	290	60
11	Quebec Nordiques	ADM	80	16	50	14	236	354	46

Divisions: PTK – Patrick, ADM – Adams

bold – Qualified for playoffs

== Schedule and results ==
1990–91 regular season
October

Game	Result	Date	Score	Opponent	Record
1	L	October 5, 1990	4–7	Pittsburgh Penguins (1990–91)	0–1–0
2	W	October 6, 1990	6–4	Detroit Red Wings (1990–91)	1–1–0
3	L	October 10, 1990	2–4	@ New York Rangers (1990–91)	1–2–0
4	W	October 12, 1990	3–1	Winnipeg Jets (1990–91)	2–2–0
5	L	October 13, 1990	2–5	New York Rangers (1990–91)	2–3–0
6	L	October 15, 1990	1–3	@ Montreal Canadiens (1990–91)	2–4–0
7	L	October 17, 1990	2–3	@ New Jersey Devils (1990–91)	2–5–0
8	W	October 19, 1990	4–3	New York Islanders (1990–91)	3–5–0
9	W	October 20, 1990	4–0	New Jersey Devils (1990–91)	4–5–0
10	W	October 23, 1990	6–2	@ Philadelphia Flyers (1990–91)	5–5–0
11	L	October 25, 1990	2–3 OT	@ Chicago Blackhawks (1990–91)	5–6–0
12	L	October 27, 1990	4–9	@ Calgary Flames (1990–91)	5–7–0
13	W	October 28, 1990	1–0	@ Edmonton Oilers (1990–91)	6–7–0
14	W	October 30, 1990	2–1	@ Vancouver Canucks (1990–91)	7–7–0

November

Game	Result	Date	Score	Opponent	Record
15	W	November 2, 1990	4–3	Los Angeles Kings (1990–91)	8–7–0
16	W	November 3, 1990	5–2	@ New York Islanders (1990–91)	9–7–0
17	W	November 6, 1990	4–1	@ Quebec Nordiques (1990–91)	10–7–0
18	L	November 10, 1990	2–4	Buffalo Sabres (1990–91)	10–8–0
19	L	November 11, 1990	3–5	Boston Bruins (1990–91)	10–9–0
20	L	November 14, 1990	3–5	@ Toronto Maple Leafs (1990–91)	10–10–0
21	L	November 16, 1990	3–4	Chicago Blackhawks (1990–91)	10–11–0
22	L	November 17, 1990	2–4	@ Hartford Whalers (1990–91)	10–12–0
23	W	November 19, 1990	3–2 OT	@ Detroit Red Wings (1990–91)	11–12–0
24	W	November 21, 1990	5–3	Toronto Maple Leafs (1990–91)	12–12–0
25	W	November 23, 1990	7–3	Pittsburgh Penguins (1990–91)	13–12–0
26	L	November 24, 1990	2–3 OT	@ Pittsburgh Penguins (1990–91)	13–13–0
27	W	November 28, 1990	6–3	@ New York Rangers (1990–91)	14–13–0
28	L	November 30, 1990	3–4	Montreal Canadiens (1990–91)	14–14–0

December

Game	Result	Date	Score	Opponent	Record
29	W	December 1, 1990	3–1	@ New York Islanders (1990–91)	15–14–0
30	W	December 5, 1990	3–1	@ Pittsburgh Penguins (1990–91)	16–14–0
31	W	December 7, 1990	5–2	New Jersey Devils (1990–91)	17–14–0
32	L	December 8, 1990	2–4	@ New Jersey Devils (1990–91)	17–15–0
33	W	December 11, 1990	4–1	Philadelphia Flyers (1990–91)	18–15–0
34	L	December 15, 1990	2–3	Hartford Whalers (1990–91)	18–16–0
35	L	December 17, 1990	3–5	@ New York Rangers (1990–91)	18–17–0
36	L	December 19, 1990	2–3	@ Chicago Blackhawks (1990–91)	18–18–0
37	T	December 20, 1990	3–3 OT	@ St. Louis Blues (1990–91)	18–18–1
38	L	December 22, 1990	2–5	Toronto Maple Leafs (1990–91)	18–19–1
39	L	December 26, 1990	3–7	Pittsburgh Penguins (1990–91)	18–20–1
40	L	December 28, 1990	3–5	New York Rangers (1990–91)	18–21–1
41	L	December 29, 1990	3–4	@ Quebec Nordiques (1990–91)	18–22–1

January

Game	Result	Date	Score	Opponent	Record
42	W	January 1, 1991	4–3	New Jersey Devils (1990–91)	19–22–1
43	T	January 4, 1991	3–3 OT	Philadelphia Flyers (1990–91)	19–22–2
44	W	January 5, 1991	5–3	@ Boston Bruins (1990–91)	20–22–2
45	W	January 11, 1991	4–2	Calgary Flames (1990–91)	21–22–2
46	L	January 12, 1991	1–4	@ Montreal Canadiens (1990–91)	21–23–2
47	L	January 15, 1991	3–7	@ St. Louis Blues (1990–91)	21–24–2
48	L	January 17, 1991	2–5	@ Minnesota North Stars (1990–91)	21–25–2
49	W	January 22, 1991	2–1 OT	@ Detroit Red Wings (1990–91)	22–25–2
50	L	January 24, 1991	1–6	@ Philadelphia Flyers (1990–91)	22–26–2
51	T	January 25, 1991	2–2 OT	Minnesota North Stars (1990–91)	22–26–3
52	W	January 27, 1991	5–4 OT	New York Islanders (1990–91)	23–26–3
53	L	January 29, 1991	2–3 OT	@ Pittsburgh Penguins (1990–91)	23–27–3
54	W	January 31, 1991	4–3 OT	@ New York Islanders (1990–91)	24–27–3

February

Game	Result	Date	Score	Opponent	Record
55	L	February 2, 1991	2–4	Winnipeg Jets (1990–91)	24–28–3
56	W	February 5, 1991	5–3	Vancouver Canucks (1990–91)	25–28–3
57	W	February 8, 1991	6–3	Edmonton Oilers (1990–91)	26–28–3
58	W	February 10, 1991	5–2	Philadelphia Flyers (1990–91)	27–28–3
59	L	February 15, 1991	2–8	@ Calgary Flames (1990–91)	27–29–3
60	L	February 16, 1991	2–4	@ Vancouver Canucks (1990–91)	27–30–3
61	L	February 18, 1991	2–5	@ Los Angeles Kings (1990–91)	27–31–3
62	W	February 22, 1991	3–2	New York Rangers (1990–91)	28–31–3
63	T	February 24, 1991	5–5 OT	Pittsburgh Penguins (1990–91)	28–31–4
64	L	February 25, 1991	1–5	@ New Jersey Devils (1990–91)	28–32–4
65	T	February 27, 1991	4–4 OT	@ New York Rangers (1990–91)	28–32–5

March

Game	Result	Date	Score	Opponent	Record
66	W	March 2, 1991	3–2	New York Islanders (1990–91)	29–32–5
67	T	March 5, 1991	3–3 OT	Los Angeles Kings (1990–91)	29–32–6
68	W	March 8, 1991	2–1	@ Winnipeg Jets (1990–91)	30–32–6
69	W	March 10, 1991	5–3	@ Edmonton Oilers (1990–91)	31–32–6
70	L	March 12, 1991	2–3	Hartford Whalers (1990–91)	31–33–6
71	W	March 14, 1991	5–3	Quebec Nordiques (1990–91)	32–33–6
72	W	March 16, 1991	6–0	Philadelphia Flyers (1990–91)	33–33–6
73	L	March 19, 1991	1–2	St. Louis Blues (1990–91)	33–34–6
74	W	March 21, 1991	6–2	@ New York Islanders (1990–91)	34–34–6
75	W	March 22, 1991	3–1	Minnesota North Stars (1990–91)	35–34–6
76	T	March 24, 1991	3–3 OT	Boston Bruins (1990–91)	35–34–7
77	L	March 26, 1991	2–4	Buffalo Sabres (1990–91)	35–35–7
78	W	March 28, 1991	3–0	@ Philadelphia Flyers (1990–91)	36–35–7
79	W	March 30, 1991	4–0	New Jersey Devils (1990–91)	37–35–7
80	L	March 31, 1991	2–5	@ Buffalo Sabres (1990–91)	37–36–7

Legend: Win (2 points) Loss (0 points) Tie (1 point)

== Playoffs ==
=== Round 1: (P2) New York Rangers vs. (P3) Washington Capitals ===
April 3	Washington Capitals	1–2	New York Rangers	Madison Square Garden

April 5	Washington Capitals	3–0	New York Rangers	Madison Square Garden

April 7	New York Rangers	6–0	Washington Capitals	Capital Centre

April 9	New York Rangers	2–3	Washington Capitals	Capital Centre

April 11	Washington Capitals	5–4	OT	New York Rangers	Madison Square Garden

April 13	New York Rangers	2–4	Washington Capitals	Capital Centre

Washington won series 4–2

=== Round 2: (P1) Pittsburgh Penguins vs. (P3) Washington Capitals ===
April 17	Washington Capitals	4–2	Pittsburgh Penguins	Civic Arena

April 19	Washington Capitals	6–7	OT	Pittsburgh Penguins	Civic Arena

April 21	Pittsburgh Penguins	3–1	Washington Capitals	Capital Centre

April 23	Pittsburgh Penguins	3–1	Washington Capitals	Capital Centre

April 25	Washington Capitals	1–4	Pittsburgh Penguins	Civic Arena

Pittsburgh won series 4–1

== Player statistics ==
=== Regular season ===
Scoring

Player	Pos	GP	G	A	Pts	PIM	+/-	PPG	SHG	GWG
Kevin Hatcher	D	79	24	50	74	69	-10	9	2	3
Mike Ridley	C	79	23	48	71	26	9	6	5	4
Michal Pivonka	C	79	20	50	70	34	3	6	0	4
John Druce	RW	80	22	36	58	46	4	7	1	4
Calle Johansson	D	80	11	41	52	23	-2	2	1	2
Kelly Miller	LW	80	24	26	50	29	10	4	2	3
Dale Hunter	C	76	16	30	46	234	-22	9	0	2
Dino Ciccarelli	RW	54	21	18	39	66	-17	2	0	2
Stephen Leach	RW	68	11	19	30	99	-9	4	0	1
Peter Bondra	RW	54	12	16	28	47	-10	4	0	1
Dmitri Khristich	LW/C	40	13	14	27	21	-1	1	0	0
Mikhail Tatarinov	D	65	8	15	23	82	-4	3	1	1
Bob Rouse	D	47	5	15	20	65	-7	1	0	0
Nick Kypreos	LW	79	9	9	18	196	-4	0	0	3
Dave Tippett	LW	61	6	9	15	24	-13	0	0	2
Al Iafrate	D	30	6	8	14	124	-1	0	1	1
Tim Bergland	RW	47	5	9	14	21	-1	0	0	0
Peter Zezel	C	20	7	5	12	10	-13	6	0	0
Alan May	RW	67	4	6	10	264	-10	0	0	0
Rod Langway	D	56	1	7	8	24	12	0	0	0
Bob Joyce	LW	17	3	3	6	8	3	0	0	1
Mike Lalor	D	68	1	5	6	61	-23	0	0	0
Ken Sabourin	D	28	1	4	5	81	6	0	0	0
Chris Felix	D	8	0	4	4	0	0	0	0	0
Rob Murray	C	17	0	3	3	19	0	0	0	0
Jeff Greenlaw	LW	10	2	0	2	10	1	0	0	1
Alfie Turcotte	C	6	1	1	2	0	-1	0	0	1
John Purves	RW	7	1	0	1	0	-3	0	0	1
Joel Quenneville	D	9	1	0	1	0	-8	0	0	0
Mark Ferner	D	7	0	1	1	4	-2	0	0	0
Bobby Babcock	D	1	0	0	0	0	0	0	0	0
Don Beaupre	G	45	0	0	0	18	0	0	0	0
Jim Hrivnak	G	9	0	0	0	0	0	0	0	0
John Kordic	RW	7	0	0	0	101	1	0	0	0
Mike Liut	G	35	0	0	0	0	0	0	0	0
Ken Lovsin	D	1	0	0	0	0	-2	0	0	0
Steve Maltais	LW	7	0	0	0	2	-1	0	0	0
Kent Paynter	D	1	0	0	0	15	0	0	0	0
Reggie Savage	C	1	0	0	0	0	-1	0	0	0
Steve Seftel	LW	4	0	0	0	2	-2	0	0	0

Goaltending

Player	MIN	GP	W	L	T	GA	GAA	SO	SA	SV	SV%
Don Beaupre	2572	45	20	18	3	113	2.64	5	1095	982	.897
Mike Liut	1834	35	13	16	3	114	3.73	0	786	672	.855
Jim Hrivnak	432	9	4	2	1	26	3.61	0	226	200	.885
Team:	4838	80	37	36	7	253	3.14	5	2107	1854	.880

=== Playoffs ===
Scoring

Player	Pos	GP	G	A	Pts	PIM	PPG	SHG	GWG
Dale Hunter	C	11	1	9	10	41	0	0	0
Dino Ciccarelli	RW	11	5	4	9	22	3	0	2
Calle Johansson	D	10	2	7	9	8	1	0	0
Mike Ridley	C	11	3	4	7	8	1	0	1
Kelly Miller	LW	11	4	2	6	6	0	1	0
Kevin Hatcher	D	11	3	3	6	8	2	0	0
Michal Pivonka	C	11	2	3	5	8	0	0	0
Dave Tippett	LW	10	2	3	5	8	0	0	0
Al Iafrate	D	10	1	3	4	22	0	0	1
Dmitri Khristich	LW/C	11	1	3	4	6	0	0	0
Mike Lalor	D	10	1	2	3	22	0	0	0
Stephen Leach	RW	9	1	2	3	8	0	0	0
Tim Bergland	RW	11	1	1	2	12	0	0	0
John Druce	RW	11	1	1	2	7	1	0	0
Alan May	RW	11	1	1	2	37	0	0	1
Rod Langway	D	11	0	2	2	6	0	0	0
Don Beaupre	G	11	0	1	1	2	0	0	0
Peter Bondra	RW	4	0	1	1	2	0	0	0
Nick Kypreos	LW	9	0	1	1	38	0	0	0
Jeff Greenlaw	LW	1	0	0	0	2	0	0	0
Mike Liut	G	2	0	0	0	0	0	0	0
Kent Paynter	D	1	0	0	0	0	0	0	0
Ken Sabourin	D	11	0	0	0	34	0	0	0
Neil Sheehy	D	2	0	0	0	19	0	0	0

Goaltending

Player	MIN	GP	W	L	GA	GAA	SO	SA	SV	SV%
Don Beaupre	624	11	5	5	29	2.79	1	294	265	.901
Mike Liut	48	2	0	1	4	5.00	0	30	26	.867
Team:	672	11	5	6	33	2.95	1	324	291	.898

Note: GP = Games played; G = Goals; A = Assists; Pts = Points; +/- = Plus/minus; PIM = Penalty minutes; PPG=Power-play goals; SHG=Short-handed goals; GWG=Game-winning goals
MIN=Minutes played; W = Wins; L = Losses; T = Ties; GA = Goals against; GAA = Goals against average; SO = Shutouts; SA=Shots against; SV=Shots saved; SV% = Save percentage;

== Draft picks ==
Washington's draft picks at the 1990 NHL entry draft held at the BC Place in Vancouver, British Columbia.

Round	#	Player	Nationality	College/Junior/Club team (League)
1	9	John Slaney	Canada	Cornwall Royals (OHL)
2	30	Rod Pasma	Canada	Cornwall Royals (OHL)
3	51	Chris Long	Canada	Peterborough Petes (OHL)
4	72	Randy Pearce	Canada	Kitchener Rangers (OHL)
5	93	Brian Sakic	Canada	Tri-City Americans (WHL)
5	94	Mark Ouimet	Canada	University of Michigan (CCHA)
6	114	Andrei Kovalev	Soviet Union	Dynamo Moscow (USSR)
7	135	Roman Kontsek	Czechoslovakia	Dukla Trencin (Czechoslovakia)
8	156	Peter Bondra	Soviet Union	VSZ Kosice (Czechoslovakia)
8	159	Steve Martell	Canada	London Knights (OHL)
9	177	Ken Klee	United States	Bowling Green State University (CCHA)
10	198	Mike Boback	United States	Providence College (Hockey East)
11	219	Alan Brown	Canada	Colgate University (ECAC)
12	240	Todd Hlushko	Canada	London Knights (OHL)
S	14	Martin Jiranek	Canada	Bowling Green State University (CCHA)

== See also ==
- 1990–91 NHL season
