= 1990–91 Vancouver Canucks season =

21st season in franchise history

1990–91 Vancouver Canucks
- Division: 4th Smythe
- Conference: 8th Campbell
- 1990–91 record: 28–43–9
- Home record: 18–17–5
- Road record: 10–26–4
- Goals for: 243
- Goals against: 315

Team information
- General manager: Pat Quinn
- Coach: Bob McCammon (19-30-5); Pat Quinn (9-13-4)
- Captain: Doug Lidster; Trevor Linden; Dan Quinn (Oct-Mar)
- Alternate captains: Garth Butcher (Mar-Apr); Steve Bozek (Mar-Apr)
- Arena: Pacific Coliseum
- Average attendance: 15,150

Team leaders
- Goals: Trevor Linden (33)
- Assists: Trevor Linden (37)
- Points: Trevor Linden (70)
- Penalty minutes: Gino Odjick (296)
- Plus/minus: Jay Mazur (+3)
- Wins: Troy Gamble (16)
- Goals against average: Troy Gamble (3.45)

The 1990–91 Vancouver Canucks season was the team's 21st in the National Hockey League (NHL).

== Offseason ==
Entering his last season as a player, Stan Smyl resigns the team captaincy. The position is rotated between defenceman Doug Lidster, forwards Trevor Linden and Dan Quinn.

== Regular season ==
=== Coaching change and USAir Flight 1493 ===
The Canucks who were slumping in the first half of the regular season fired head coach Bob McCammon on January 31, 1991. He was fired immediately after a home game against the New York Rangers that ended in a 3–3 tie. The game was noted for a spectacular goal tending performance by Rangers goal tender Mike Richter who made 59 saves.

The next day McCammon was replaced by Pat Quinn who would fly down with the team to Los Angeles on board the Canadian Airlines charter to coach his first game for the club against the Los Angeles Kings. Upon landing at Los Angeles International Airport the team charter witnessed the fatal collision of USAir Flight 1493 and SkyWest Flight 5569 as the aircraft landed on a parallel runway approximately 100 metres (110 yd) from the collision. The pilot of the plane carrying the team even turned on the engines to move away from the accident, fearing that the plane would be involved in the accident.

Quinn and the team were badly shaken by the incident, the team was unable to cope with the disaster when they faced the Kings on February 2. The team suffered its worst defeat of the season 9–1. The crash was still bothering the team when they flew out of Los Angeles to another road game in Washington, D.C. to face the Washington Capitals. The Canucks would be held winless for their seventh straight game as hall of famer Dino Ciccarelli netted his 400th career regular season NHL goal.

=== Final standings ===
Smythe Division
| | GP | W | L | T | GF | GA | Pts |
|---|---|---|---|---|---|---|---|
| **Los Angeles Kings** | 80 | 46 | 24 | 10 | 340 | 254 | 102 |
| **Calgary Flames** | 80 | 46 | 26 | 8 | 344 | 263 | 100 |
| **Edmonton Oilers** | 80 | 37 | 37 | 6 | 272 | 272 | 80 |
| **Vancouver Canucks** | 80 | 28 | 43 | 9 | 243 | 315 | 65 |
| Winnipeg Jets | 80 | 26 | 43 | 11 | 260 | 288 | 63 |

Note: GP = Games played, W = Wins, L = Losses, T = Ties, Pts = Points, GF = Goals for, GA = Goals against
Note: Teams that qualified for the playoffs are highlighted in bold.

Campbell Conference
| R | | Div | GP | W | L | T | GF | GA | Pts |
|---|---|---|---|---|---|---|---|---|---|
| **1** | **p – Chicago Blackhawks** | **NRS** | **80** | **49** | **23** | **8** | **284** | **211** | **106** |
| **2** | **St. Louis Blues** | **NRS** | **80** | **47** | **22** | **11** | **310** | **250** | **105** |
| **3** | **Los Angeles Kings** | **SMY** | **80** | **46** | **24** | **10** | **340** | **254** | **102** |
| **4** | **Calgary Flames** | **SMY** | **80** | **46** | **26** | **8** | **344** | **263** | **100** |
| **5** | **Edmonton Oilers** | **SMY** | **80** | **37** | **37** | **6** | **272** | **272** | **80** |
| **6** | **Detroit Red Wings** | **NRS** | **80** | **34** | **38** | **8** | **273** | **298** | **76** |
| **7** | **Minnesota North Stars** | **NRS** | **80** | **27** | **39** | **14** | **256** | **266** | **68** |
| **8** | **Vancouver Canucks** | **SMY** | **80** | **28** | **43** | **9** | **243** | **315** | **65** |
| 9 | Winnipeg Jets | SMY | 80 | 26 | 43 | 11 | 260 | 288 | 63 |
| 10 | Toronto Maple Leafs | NRS | 80 | 23 | 46 | 11 | 241 | 318 | 57 |

Divisions: NRS – Norris, SMY – Smythe

bold – Qualified for playoffs; p – Won Presidents' Trophy

== Schedule and results ==
1990–91 regular season
October

| Game | Result | Date | Score | Opponent | Record |
|---|---|---|---|---|---|
| 1 | L | October 4, 1990 | 2–3 OT | @ Calgary Flames (1990–91) | 0–1–0 |
| 2 | W | October 6, 1990 | 6–3 | @ Los Angeles Kings (1990–91) | 1–1–0 |
| 3 | L | October 9, 1990 | 2–6 | Los Angeles Kings (1990–91) | 1–2–0 |
| 4 | W | October 12, 1990 | 4–0 | St. Louis Blues (1990–91) | 2–2–0 |
| 5 | W | October 14, 1990 | 5–4 OT | Edmonton Oilers (1990–91) | 3–2–0 |
| 6 | W | October 17, 1990 | 3–1 | Boston Bruins (1990–91) | 4–2–0 |
| 7 | L | October 19, 1990 | 5–7 | @ Winnipeg Jets (1990–91) | 4–3–0 |
| 8 | W | October 21, 1990 | 3–2 | @ Quebec Nordiques (1990–91) | 5–3–0 |
| 9 | L | October 23, 1990 | 0–6 | @ Detroit Red Wings (1990–91) | 5–4–0 |
| 10 | L | October 25, 1990 | 2–4 | @ Boston Bruins (1990–91) | 5–5–0 |
| 11 | W | October 27, 1990 | 4–2 | @ Hartford Whalers (1990–91) | 6–5–0 |
| 12 | L | October 30, 1990 | 1–2 | Washington Capitals (1990–91) | 6–6–0 |

November

| Game | Result | Date | Score | Opponent | Record |
|---|---|---|---|---|---|
| 13 | W | November 1, 1990 | 2–1 | New Jersey Devils (1990–91) | 7–6–0 |
| 14 | L | November 3, 1990 | 3–5 | Winnipeg Jets (1990–91) | 7–7–0 |
| 15 | W | November 6, 1990 | 6–3 | Detroit Red Wings (1990–91) | 8–7–0 |
| 16 | W | November 8, 1990 | 5–3 | @ Toronto Maple Leafs (1990–91) | 9–7–0 |
| 17 | L | November 9, 1990 | 1–7 | @ Buffalo Sabres (1990–91) | 9–8–0 |
| 18 | L | November 11, 1990 | 0–2 | @ Philadelphia Flyers (1990–91) | 9–9–0 |
| 19 | L | November 14, 1990 | 3–5 | @ Edmonton Oilers (1990–91) | 9–10–0 |
| 20 | W | November 16, 1990 | 3–2 | New York Islanders (1990–91) | 10–10–0 |
| 21 | L | November 19, 1990 | 4–6 | Calgary Flames (1990–91) | 10–11–0 |
| 22 | W | November 21, 1990 | 4–1 | Chicago Blackhawks (1990–91) | 11–11–0 |
| 23 | L | November 23, 1990 | 4–6 | @ Minnesota North Stars (1990–91) | 11–12–0 |
| 24 | T | November 24, 1990 | 3–3 OT | @ St. Louis Blues (1990–91) | 11–12–1 |
| 25 | T | November 27, 1990 | 1–1 OT | Minnesota North Stars (1990–91) | 11–12–2 |
| 26 | W | November 29, 1990 | 2–1 | Toronto Maple Leafs (1990–91) | 12–12–2 |

December

| Game | Result | Date | Score | Opponent | Record |
|---|---|---|---|---|---|
| 27 | W | December 2, 1990 | 5–1 | @ Winnipeg Jets (1990–91) | 13–12–2 |
| 28 | W | December 4, 1990 | 4–2 | @ New York Islanders (1990–91) | 14–12–2 |
| 29 | L | December 5, 1990 | 4–9 | @ New Jersey Devils (1990–91) | 14–13–2 |
| 30 | T | December 7, 1990 | 2–2 OT | @ Pittsburgh Penguins (1990–91) | 14–13–3 |
| 31 | L | December 10, 1990 | 2–3 OT | Quebec Nordiques (1990–91) | 14–14–3 |
| 32 | L | December 12, 1990 | 4–5 | @ Edmonton Oilers (1990–91) | 14–15–3 |
| 33 | L | December 14, 1990 | 3–5 | New York Rangers (1990–91) | 14–16–3 |
| 34 | L | December 16, 1990 | 2–5 | Calgary Flames (1990–91) | 14–17–3 |
| 35 | W | December 18, 1990 | 3–2 | @ Calgary Flames (1990–91) | 15–17–3 |
| 36 | W | December 20, 1990 | 7–4 | Edmonton Oilers (1990–91) | 16–17–3 |
| 37 | W | December 22, 1990 | 4–3 | Los Angeles Kings (1990–91) | 17–17–3 |
| 38 | L | December 23, 1990 | 3–4 | @ Edmonton Oilers (1990–91) | 17–18–3 |
| 39 | L | December 27, 1990 | 5–7 | Montreal Canadiens (1990–91) | 17–19–3 |
| 40 | L | December 28, 1990 | 2–5 | Edmonton Oilers (1990–91) | 17–20–3 |
| 41 | L | December 31, 1990 | 1–2 | @ Winnipeg Jets (1990–91) | 17–21–3 |

January

| Game | Result | Date | Score | Opponent | Record |
|---|---|---|---|---|---|
| 42 | L | January 2, 1991 | 2–5 | @ Hartford Whalers (1990–91) | 17–22–3 |
| 43 | L | January 3, 1991 | 3–8 | @ Boston Bruins (1990–91) | 17–23–3 |
| 44 | W | January 5, 1991 | 6–5 | @ Minnesota North Stars (1990–91) | 18–23–3 |
| 45 | T | January 8, 1991 | 3–3 OT | Buffalo Sabres (1990–91) | 18–23–4 |
| 46 | L | January 10, 1991 | 4–5 | Hartford Whalers (1990–91) | 18–24–4 |
| 47 | L | January 12, 1991 | 2–6 | @ Los Angeles Kings (1990–91) | 18–25–4 |
| 48 | L | January 16, 1991 | 1–2 | Winnipeg Jets (1990–91) | 18–26–4 |
| 49 | W | January 23, 1991 | 6–5 | Edmonton Oilers (1990–91) | 19–26–4 |
| 50 | L | January 25, 1991 | 1–5 | Los Angeles Kings (1990–91) | 19–27–4 |
| 51 | L | January 26, 1991 | 4–5 | @ Los Angeles Kings (1990–91) | 19–28–4 |
| 52 | L | January 28, 1991 | 0–1 | Chicago Blackhawks (1990–91) | 19–29–4 |
| 53 | L | January 30, 1991 | 4–9 | @ Edmonton Oilers (1990–91) | 19–30–4 |
| 54 | T | January 31, 1991 | 3–3 OT | New York Rangers (1990–91) | 19–30–5 |

February

| Game | Result | Date | Score | Opponent | Record |
|---|---|---|---|---|---|
| 55 | L | February 2, 1991 | 1–9 | @ Los Angeles Kings (1990–91) | 19–31–5 |
| 56 | L | February 5, 1991 | 3–5 | @ Washington Capitals (1990–91) | 19–32–5 |
| 57 | W | February 7, 1991 | 2–1 | @ Philadelphia Flyers (1990–91) | 20–32–5 |
| 58 | L | February 8, 1991 | 1–8 | @ New York Rangers (1990–91) | 20–33–5 |
| 59 | L | February 10, 1991 | 0–2 | @ New Jersey Devils (1990–91) | 20–34–5 |
| 60 | L | February 14, 1991 | 2–3 | St. Louis Blues (1990–91) | 20–35–5 |
| 61 | W | February 16, 1991 | 4–2 | Washington Capitals (1990–91) | 21–35–5 |
| 62 | T | February 18, 1991 | 3–3 OT | Quebec Nordiques (1990–91) | 21–35–6 |
| 63 | T | February 20, 1991 | 5–5 OT | @ Winnipeg Jets (1990–91) | 21–35–7 |
| 64 | L | February 21, 1991 | 4–6 | @ Calgary Flames (1990–91) | 21–36–7 |
| 65 | W | February 23, 1991 | 5–2 | Detroit Red Wings (1990–91) | 22–36–7 |
| 66 | W | February 25, 1991 | 4–2 | Calgary Flames (1990–91) | 23–36–7 |
| 67 | W | February 27, 1991 | 4–3 | Pittsburgh Penguins (1990–91) | 24–36–7 |

March

| Game | Result | Date | Score | Opponent | Record |
|---|---|---|---|---|---|
| 68 | L | March 1, 1991 | 1–7 | Montreal Canadiens (1990–91) | 24–37–7 |
| 69 | L | March 3, 1991 | 0–8 | @ Chicago Blackhawks (1990–91) | 24–38–7 |
| 70 | L | March 5, 1991 | 1–4 | @ Pittsburgh Penguins (1990–91) | 24–39–7 |
| 71 | T | March 7, 1991 | 3–3 OT | @ Toronto Maple Leafs (1990–91) | 24–39–8 |
| 72 | L | March 9, 1991 | 2–4 | @ Montreal Canadiens (1990–91) | 24–40–8 |
| 73 | W | March 10, 1991 | 7–5 | @ Buffalo Sabres (1990–91) | 25–40–8 |
| 74 | L | March 13, 1991 | 4–5 OT | Philadelphia Flyers (1990–91) | 25–41–8 |
| 75 | T | March 16, 1991 | 4–4 OT | New York Islanders (1990–91) | 25–41–9 |
| 76 | W | March 17, 1991 | 5–4 OT | Los Angeles Kings (1990–91) | 26–41–9 |
| 77 | L | March 20, 1991 | 2–3 | Calgary Flames (1990–91) | 26–42–9 |
| 78 | W | March 22, 1991 | 3–1 | Winnipeg Jets (1990–91) | 27–42–9 |
| 79 | L | March 26, 1991 | 2–7 | @ Calgary Flames (1990–91) | 27–43–9 |
| 80 | W | March 28, 1991 | 3–2 OT | Winnipeg Jets (1990–91) | 28–43–9 |

Legend: Win (2 points) Loss (0 points) Tie (1 point)

== Playoffs ==
1991 Stanley Cup playoffs
Smythe Division Semifinals vs. (S1) Los Angeles Kings – Kings win 4–2

| Game | Date | Visitor | Score | Home | OT | Series |
|---|---|---|---|---|---|---|
| 1 | April 4 | Vancouver | 6 - 5 | Los Angeles | | 1 - 0 |
| 2 | April 6 | Vancouver | 2 – 3 | Los Angeles | OT | 1 – 1 |
| 3 | April 8 | Los Angeles | 1 – 2 | Vancouver | OT | 2 – 1 |
| 4 | April 10 | Los Angeles | 6 – 1 | Vancouver | | 2 – 2 |
| 5 | April 12 | Vancouver | 4 – 7 | Los Angeles | | 2 – 3 |
| 6 | April 14 | Los Angeles | 4 – 1 | Vancouver | | 2 – 4 |

Legend: Win Loss

== Player statistics ==
Note: GP = Games played; G = Goals; A = Assists; Pts = Points; +/- = Plus/Minus; PIM = Penalty Minutes

| Player | GP | G | A | Pts | +/- | PIM |
|---|---|---|---|---|---|---|
| Trevor Linden | 80 | 33 | 37 | 70 | -25 | 65 |
| Dan Quinn | 64 | 18 | 31 | 49 | -28 | 46 |
| Greg Adams | 55 | 21 | 24 | 45 | -5 | 10 |
| Dave Capuano | 61 | 13 | 31 | 44 | 1 | 42 |
| Doug Lidster | 78 | 6 | 32 | 38 | -6 | 77 |

== Transactions ==
=== Trades ===
| September 7, 1990 | To Vancouver Canucks Dave Mackey | To Minnesota North Stars future considerations |
| January 12, 1991 | To Vancouver Canucks Gerald Diduck | To Montreal Canadiens 4th round pick in 1991 (Vladimir Vujtek) |
| January 13, 1991 | To Vancouver Canucks Tom Kurvers | To Toronto Maple Leafs Brian Bradley |
| January 16, 1991 | To Vancouver Canucks 2nd round draft pick in 1992 (Michael Peca) | To Boston Bruins Petri Skriko |
| January 22, 1991 | To Vancouver Canucks Brian Blab | To Toronto Maple Leafs Todd Hawkins |
| March 5, 1991 | To Vancouver Canucks Cliff Ronning; Sergio Momesso; Geoff Courtnall; Robert Dirk; 5th round draft pick in 1992 (Brian Loney) | To St. Louis Blues Garth Butcher; Dan Quinn |
| March 5, 1991 | To Vancouver Canucks Dana Murzyn | To Calgary Flames Ron Stern; Kevan Guy |
| March 5, 1991 | To Vancouver Canucks Cash | To Buffalo Sabres Steve Weeks |

== Draft picks ==
Vancouver's picks at the 1990 NHL entry draft in Vancouver, British Columbia.

| Round | # | Player | Nationality | College/Junior/Club team (League) |
|---|---|---|---|---|
| 1 | 2 | Petr Nedved (C) | Czechoslovakia | Seattle Thunderbirds (WHL) |
| 1 | 18 | Shawn Antoski (LW) | Canada | North Bay Centennials (OHL) |
| 2 | 23 | Jiri Slegr (D) | Czechoslovakia | HC Litvínov (CSSR) |
| 4 | 65 | Darin Bader (LW) | Canada | Saskatoon Blades (WHL) |
| 5 | 86 | Gino Odjick (LW) | Canada | Laval Titan (QMJHL) |
| 7 | 128 | Daryl Filipek (D) | Canada | Ferris State University (CCHA) |
| 8 | 149 | Paul O'Hagan (D) | Canada | Oshawa Generals (OHL) |
| 9 | 170 | Mark Cipriano (RW) | Canada | Victoria Cougars (WHL) |
| 10 | 191 | Troy Neumeier (D) | Canada | Prince Albert Raiders (WHL) |
| 11 | 212 | Tyler Ertel (C) | Canada | North Bay Centennials (OHL) |
| 12 | 233 | Karri Kivi (D) | Finland | Ilves (SM-liiga) |
| S | 2 | Paul Dukovac (D) | Canada | Cornell University (ECAC) |
| S | 7 | Normand Krumpschmid (C) | Canada | Ferris State University (CCHA) |

== Farm teams ==
Milwaukee Admirals (IHL)

== See also ==
- 1990–91 NHL season
