= Frank Breault =

Canadian ice hockey player

- Born: May 11, 1967 (age 59) Acton Vale, Quebec, Canada
- Height: 5 ft 11 in (180 cm)
- Weight: 185 lb (84 kg; 13 st 3 lb)
- Position: Right wing
- Shot: Right
- Played for: Los Angeles Kings; Durham Wasps
- NHL draft: Undrafted
- Playing career: 1988–1994

Francois Breault (born May 11, 1967) is a Canadian former professional ice hockey player who played 27 games in the National Hockey League for the Los Angeles Kings between 1990 and 1992.

== Biography ==
Breault was born in Acton Vale, Quebec. As a youth, he played in the 1979 Quebec International Pee-Wee Hockey Tournament with a minor ice hockey team from Acton Vale.

He played for the Los Angeles Kings during the 1990–91 and the 1991–92 seasons. During his NHL career he played 27 games, scoring 2 goals along with 4 assists. Along with the Kings, Breault also played for the Phoenix Roadrunners and Utica Devils during the 1992–93 season. His final season came in England during 1993-94 playing for the Durham Wasps.

Breault suffered an injury to his Anterior cruciate ligament 17 games into the 1990–91 season which caused him to miss the remainder of the season. The injury likely cut his playing career much shorter than it would otherwise have been.

== Career statistics ==
=== Regular season and playoffs ===
			Regular season					Playoffs
Season	Team	League	GP	G	A	Pts	PIM	GP	G	A	Pts	PIM
1983–84	Cantons de l'Est Cantonniers	QMAAA	36	15	13	28	76	13	2	3	5	28
1984–85	Chicoutimi Saguenéens	QMJHL	68	8	6	14	50	14	2	1	3	36
1985–86	Chicoutimi Saguenéens	QMJHL	9	0	0	0	17	—	—	—	—	—
1985–86	Trois-Rivières Draveurs	QMJHL	51	15	11	26	56	5	0	1	1	18
1986–87	Trois-Rivières Draveurs	QMJHL	45	20	24	44	89	—	—	—	—	—
1986–87	Granby Bisons	QMJHL	15	4	9	13	45	8	3	2	5	14
1987–88	Trois-Rivières Draveurs	QMJHL	28	16	19	35	108	—	—	—	—	—
1987–88	Maine Mariners	AHL	11	0	1	1	37	—	—	—	—	—
1988–89	New Haven Nighthawks	AHL	68	21	24	45	51	—	—	—	—	—
1989–90	New Haven Nighthawks	AHL	37	17	21	38	33	—	—	—	—	—
1990–91	Los Angeles Kings	NHL	17	1	4	5	6	—	—	—	—	—
1991–92	Los Angeles Kings	NHL	6	1	0	1	30	—	—	—	—	—
1991–92	Phoenix Roadrunners	IHL	54	14	19	33	40	—	—	—	—	—
1992–93	Los Angeles Kings	NHL	4	0	0	0	6	—	—	—	—	—
1992–93	Phoenix Roadrunners	IHL	31	5	11	16	26	—	—	—	—	—
1992–93	Utica Devils	AHL	32	8	20	28	56	4	2	0	2	0
1993–94	Durham Wasps	BHL	14	23	17	40	20	6	6	4	10	2
NHL totals			27	2	4	6	42	—	—	—	—	—
AHL totals			148	46	66	112	177	4	2	0	2	0
