= Ron Hoover =

Canadian ice hockey player

- Born: October 28, 1966 (age 59) Oakville, Ontario, Canada
- Height: 6 ft 1 in (185 cm)
- Weight: 185 lb (84 kg; 13 st 3 lb)
- Position: Left Wing
- Shot: Left
- Played for: Boston Bruins; St. Louis Blues
- NHL draft: 158th overall, 1986; Hartford Whalers
- Playing career: 1989–1998

Ronald Kenneth Hoover (born October 28, 1966) is a Canadian retired ice hockey left winger.

== Biography ==
Hoover was born in Oakville, Ontario. As a youth, he played in the 1979 Quebec International Pee-Wee Hockey Tournament with a minor ice hockey team from Greater Sudbury.

He was drafted 158th overall by the Hartford Whalers in the 1986 NHL entry draft and after four seasons with the Western Michigan University, he signed with the Boston Bruins as a free agent in 1989. He played 17 games for Boston in two seasons, scoring four goals. His first NHL goal came on January 3, 1991 in Boston's 8-3 victory over Vancouver at Boston Garden. He spent most of his Bruins' tenure with the American Hockey League's Maine Mariners. In 1991 he signed with the St. Louis Blues but only managed to play just one game for St. Louis. Instead, he spent five seasons with the Peoria Rivermen of the International Hockey League where he was a popular player for the team with his goal-scoring ability. He then had a brief spell with the Cincinnati Cyclones where he played just four games before joining the San Antonio Dragons. He never matched his number from Peoria, scoring just two goals in 21 games. He moved to the United Hockey League with the Brantford Smoke and scored 27 goals in 41 games for the team before returning to San Antonio. Once again though his spell was uneventful, scoring just one goal in 21 games. He retired shortly afterwards in 1998.

Hoover's son Matthew (b. 1996) is also a hockey player, who will begin his NCAA career at Canisius College beginning in September 2016.

== Career statistics ==
| | | | Regular season | | | | | Playoffs |
| Season | Team | League | GP | G | A | Pts | PIM | GP | G | A | Pts | PIM |
|---|---|---|---|---|---|---|---|---|---|---|---|---|
| 1983–84 | Oakville Blades | COJHL | 40 | 33 | 26 | 59 | 47 | — | — | — | — | — |
| 1983–84 | Richmond Hill Dynes | OJHL | 1 | 1 | 0 | 1 | 2 | — | — | — | — | — |
| 1984–85 | Oakville Blades | COJHL | 38 | 29 | 41 | 70 | 76 | — | — | — | — | — |
| 1985–86 | Western Michigan University | NCAA | 43 | 10 | 23 | 33 | 36 | — | — | — | — | — |
| 1986–87 | Western Michigan University | NCAA | 34 | 7 | 10 | 17 | 22 | — | — | — | — | — |
| 1987–88 | Western Michigan University | NCAA | 42 | 39 | 23 | 62 | 40 | — | — | — | — | — |
| 1988–89 | Western Michigan University | NCAA | 42 | 32 | 27 | 59 | 66 | — | — | — | — | — |
| 1989–90 | Boston Bruins | NHL | 2 | 0 | 0 | 0 | 0 | — | — | — | — | — |
| 1989–90 | Maine Mariners | AHL | 75 | 28 | 26 | 54 | 57 | — | — | — | — | — |
| 1990–91 | Boston Bruins | NHL | 15 | 4 | 0 | 4 | 31 | 8 | 0 | 0 | 0 | 18 |
| 1990–91 | Maine Mariners | AHL | 62 | 28 | 16 | 44 | 40 | — | — | — | — | — |
| 1991–92 | St. Louis Blues | NHL | 1 | 0 | 0 | 0 | 0 | — | — | — | — | — |
| 1991–92 | Peoria Rivermen | IHL | 71 | 27 | 34 | 61 | 30 | 10 | 4 | 4 | 8 | 4 |
| 1992–93 | Peoria Rivermen | IHL | 58 | 17 | 13 | 30 | 28 | 4 | 1 | 1 | 2 | 2 |
| 1993–94 | Peoria Rivermen | IHL | 80 | 26 | 24 | 50 | 89 | 6 | 0 | 1 | 1 | 10 |
| 1994–95 | Peoria Rivermen | IHL | 76 | 22 | 20 | 42 | 70 | 9 | 2 | 1 | 3 | 12 |
| 1995–96 | Peoria Rivermen | IHL | 74 | 22 | 15 | 37 | 94 | 12 | 0 | 3 | 3 | 8 |
| 1996–97 | Cincinnati Cyclones | IHL | 4 | 1 | 1 | 2 | 0 | — | — | — | — | — |
| 1996–97 | San Antonio Dragons | IHL | 21 | 2 | 3 | 5 | 18 | 8 | 1 | 1 | 2 | 0 |
| 1997–98 | San Antonio Dragons | IHL | 21 | 1 | 3 | 4 | 20 | — | — | — | — | — |
| 1997–98 | Brantford Smoke | UHL | 41 | 27 | 24 | 51 | 20 | 9 | 2 | 8 | 10 | 18 |
| NHL totals | | | 18 | 4 | 0 | 4 | 31 | 8 | 0 | 0 | 0 | 18 |
| AHL totals | | | 137 | 56 | 42 | 98 | 97 | — | — | — | — | — |
| IHL totals | | | 405 | 118 | 113 | 231 | 349 | 49 | 8 | 11 | 19 | 36 |

== Awards and honours ==
| Award | Year |
|---|---|
| All-CCHA Second Team | 1987-88 |
