= 1990–91 New Jersey Devils season =

National Hockey League season

1990–91 New Jersey Devils
- Division: 4th Patrick
- Conference: 7th Wales
- 1990–91 record: 32–33–15
- Home record: 23–10–7
- Road record: 9–23–8
- Goals for: 272
- Goals against: 264

Team information
- General manager: Lou Lamoriello
- Coach: John Cunniff; Tom McVie
- Captain: Kirk Muller
- Alternate captains: John MacLean; Patrik Sundstrom
- Arena: Brendan Byrne Arena

Team leaders
- Goals: John MacLean (45)
- Assists: Kirk Muller (51)
- Points: John MacLean (78)
- Penalty minutes: Ken Daneyko (249)
- Plus/minus: Alexei Kasatonov (+23)
- Wins: Chris Terreri (24)
- Goals against average: Chris Terreri (2.91)

The 1990–91 New Jersey Devils season was the 17th season for the National Hockey League (NHL) franchise that was established on June 11, 1974, and ninth season since the franchise relocated from Colorado prior to the 1982–83 NHL season. The season saw the team finish fourth in the Patrick Division and qualify for the playoffs for the second consecutive season, losing in the division semi-finals to the Pittsburgh Penguins. This was the first time in the franchise's 17-year history that the team qualified for the playoffs in consecutive seasons. The team would make one huge move towards their future when they drafted Martin Brodeur with their first round selection in the 1990 NHL entry draft.

== Regular season ==
=== Season standings ===
Patrick Division
	GP	W	L	T	GF	GA	Pts
**Pittsburgh Penguins**	80	41	33	6	342	305	88
**New York Rangers**	80	36	31	13	297	265	85
**Washington Capitals**	80	37	36	7	258	258	81
**New Jersey Devils**	80	32	33	15	272	264	79
Philadelphia Flyers	80	33	37	10	252	267	76
New York Islanders	80	25	45	10	223	290	60

Note: GP = Games played, W = Wins, L = Losses, T = Ties, Pts = Points, GF = Goals for, GA = Goals against
Note: Teams that qualified for the playoffs are highlighted in bold.

Wales Conference
R		Div	GP	W	L	T	GF	GA	Pts
**1**	**Boston Bruins**	**ADM**	**80**	**44**	**24**	**12**	**299**	**264**	**100**
**2**	**Montreal Canadiens**	**ADM**	**80**	**39**	**30**	**11**	**273**	**249**	**89**
**3**	**Pittsburgh Penguins**	**PTK**	**80**	**41**	**33**	**6**	**342**	**305**	**88**
**4**	**New York Rangers**	**PTK**	**80**	**36**	**31**	**13**	**297**	**265**	**85**
**5**	**Washington Capitals**	**PTK**	**80**	**37**	**36**	**7**	**258**	**258**	**81**
**6**	**Buffalo Sabres**	**ADM**	**80**	**31**	**30**	**19**	**292**	**278**	**81**
**7**	**New Jersey Devils**	**PTK**	**80**	**32**	**33**	**15**	**272**	**264**	**79**
8	Philadelphia Flyers	PTK	80	33	37	10	252	267	76
**9**	**Hartford Whalers**	**ADM**	**80**	**31**	**38**	**11**	**238**	**276**	**73**
10	New York Islanders	PTK	80	25	45	10	223	290	60
11	Quebec Nordiques	ADM	80	16	50	14	236	354	46

Divisions: PTK – Patrick, ADM – Adams

bold – Qualified for playoffs

== Schedule and results ==
1990–91 regular season
October

Game	Result	Date	Score	Opponent	Record
1	T	October 4, 1990	3–3 OT	Detroit Red Wings	0–0–1
2	W	October 6, 1990	3–1	Philadelphia Flyers	1–0–1
3	L	October 7, 1990	4–7	@ Pittsburgh Penguins	1–1–1
4	W	October 9, 1990	5–2	Minnesota North Stars	2–1–1
5	L	October 11, 1990	4–7	@ Philadelphia Flyers	2–2–1
6	W	October 13, 1990	5–3	Calgary Flames	3–2–1
7	W	October 17, 1990	3–2	Washington Capitals	4–2–1
8	W	October 19, 1990	3–2	New York Rangers	5–2–1
9	L	October 20, 1990	0–4	@ Washington Capitals	5–3–1
10	W	October 23, 1990	8–1	@ New York Islanders	6–3–1
11	W	October 25, 1990	5–1	Buffalo Sabres	7–3–1
12	W	October 27, 1990	7–5	Pittsburgh Penguins	8–3–1
13	L	October 30, 1990	3–6	@ Calgary Flames	8–4–1

November

Game	Result	Date	Score	Opponent	Record
14	L	November 1, 1990	1–2	@ Vancouver Canucks	8–5–1
15	W	November 3, 1990	5–2	@ Edmonton Oilers	9–5–1
16	L	November 7, 1990	3–6	New York Islanders	9–6–1
17	L	November 9, 1990	2–3	New York Rangers	9–7–1
18	L	November 10, 1990	1–3	@ Montreal Canadiens	9–8–1
19	W	November 13, 1990	6–3	Montreal Canadiens	10–8–1
20	L	November 15, 1990	2–4	Hartford Whalers	10–9–1
21	W	November 17, 1990	3–2	Philadelphia Flyers	11–9–1
22	W	November 18, 1990	4–1	@ Philadelphia Flyers	12–9–1
23	L	November 20, 1990	4–5	@ Los Angeles Kings	12–10–1
24	W	November 24, 1990	5–3	@ Minnesota North Stars	13–10–1
25	T	November 28, 1990	5–5 OT	Philadelphia Flyers	13–10–2
26	T	November 30, 1990	5–5 OT	New York Islanders	13–10–3

December

Game	Result	Date	Score	Opponent	Record
27	W	December 1, 1990	4–1	@ St. Louis Blues	14–10–3
28	T	December 3, 1990	4–4 OT	@ Winnipeg Jets	14–10–4
29	W	December 5, 1990	9–4	Vancouver Canucks	15–10–4
30	L	December 7, 1990	2–5	@ Washington Capitals	15–11–4
31	W	December 8, 1990	4–2	Washington Capitals	16–11–4
32	L	December 11, 1990	2–3	@ New York Islanders	16–12–4
33	L	December 13, 1990	5–9	@ Pittsburgh Penguins	16–13–4
34	T	December 15, 1990	1–1 OT	@ Boston Bruins	16–13–5
35	W	December 18, 1990	8–3	Boston Bruins	17–13–5
36	T	December 20, 1990	3–3 OT	@ Philadelphia Flyers	17–13–6
37	W	December 22, 1990	4–1	@ Quebec Nordiques	18–13–6
38	W	December 23, 1990	4–2	Toronto Maple Leafs	19–13–6
39	T	December 27, 1990	1–1 OT	New York Islanders	19–13–7
40	T	December 29, 1990	4–4 OT	Buffalo Sabres	19–13–8
41	T	December 30, 1990	2–2 OT	@ New York Rangers	19–13–9

January

Game	Result	Date	Score	Opponent	Record
42	L	January 1, 1991	3–4	@ Washington Capitals	19–14–9
43	L	January 3, 1991	3–5	@ Chicago Blackhawks	19–15–9
44	L	January 5, 1991	2–5	@ Pittsburgh Penguins	19–16–9
45	L	January 8, 1991	3–5	St. Louis Blues	19–17–9
46	L	January 12, 1991	4–5 OT	Edmonton Oilers	19–18–9
47	L	January 14, 1991	1–6	Los Angeles Kings	19–19–9
48	T	January 16, 1991	2–2 OT	Chicago Blackhawks	19–19–10
49	L	January 22, 1991	3–5	@ Pittsburgh Penguins	19–20–10
50	W	January 24, 1991	6–1	Quebec Nordiques	20–20–10
51	L	January 26, 1991	1–3	Minnesota North Stars	20–21–10
52	W	January 28, 1991	6–2	@ Detroit Red Wings	21–21–10
53	W	January 30, 1991	4–2	@ Los Angeles Kings	22–21–10

February

Game	Result	Date	Score	Opponent	Record
54	L	February 2, 1991	4–5	@ St. Louis Blues	22–22–10
55	W	February 5, 1991	2–1	Calgary Flames	23–22–10
56	L	February 9, 1991	1–3	@ Quebec Nordiques	23–23–10
57	W	February 10, 1991	2–0	Vancouver Canucks	24–23–10
58	L	February 13, 1991	3–6	@ New York Rangers	24–24–10
59	T	February 14, 1991	3–3 OT	Winnipeg Jets	24–24–11
60	W	February 16, 1991	3–2	Philadelphia Flyers	25–24–11
61	L	February 18, 1991	0–4	Edmonton Oilers	25–25–11
62	W	February 22, 1991	5–2	Pittsburgh Penguins	26–25–11
63	L	February 24, 1991	2–5	@ New York Rangers	26–26–11
64	W	February 25, 1991	5–1	Washington Capitals	27–26–11
65	L	February 27, 1991	3–7	@ Toronto Maple Leafs	27–27–11

March

Game	Result	Date	Score	Opponent	Record
66	W	March 1, 1991	6–1	@ Detroit Red Wings	28–27–11
67	L	March 3, 1991	1–3	Boston Bruins	28–28–11
68	L	March 5, 1991	3–4	@ New York Islanders	28–29–11
69	T	March 6, 1991	3–3 OT	@ Buffalo Sabres	28–29–12
70	L	March 10, 1991	3–4	@ Winnipeg Jets	28–30–12
71	W	March 13, 1991	3–2	Toronto Maple Leafs	29–30–12
72	W	March 15, 1991	5–2	New York Rangers	30–30–12
73	L	March 16, 1991	2–6	@ Hartford Whalers	30–31–12
74	W	March 19, 1991	5–4	Pittsburgh Penguins	31–31–12
75	T	March 21, 1991	2–2 OT	@ Chicago Blackhawks	31–31–13
76	T	March 23, 1991	3–3 OT	@ Montreal Canadiens	31–31–14
77	T	March 26, 1991	3–3 OT	@ New York Rangers	31–31–15
78	W	March 27, 1991	4–3 OT	Hartford Whalers	32–31–15
79	L	March 30, 1991	0–4	@ Washington Capitals	32–32–15
80	L	March 31, 1991	2–3	New York Islanders	32–33–15

Legend: Win (2 points) Loss (0 points) Tie (1 point)

== Playoffs ==
=== Patrick Division Semifinals ===
==== (P4) New Jersey Devils vs. (P1) Pittsburgh Penguins ====
The first two games took place at Civic Arena in Pittsburgh. In game 1, the Devils won 3–1. However, in game 2, the Penguins tied the series with a 5–4 overtime win. Games 3 and 4 were at the Meadowlands in New Jersey. Pittsburgh was victorious in game 3 by a score of 4–3, but the Devils won in game 4 4–1. Game 5 shifted back to Pittsburgh where the Devils beat the Penguins 4–2. Game 6 was back in New Jersey, where the series was evened again thanks to a Pittsburgh 4–3 win. Game 7 was back in Pittsburgh where the Penguins won the game 4–0 and won the series 4–3.

== Player statistics ==
=== Regular season ===
Scoring

Player	Pos	GP	G	A	Pts	PIM	+/-	PPG	SHG	GWG
John MacLean	RW	78	45	33	78	150	8	19	2	7
Kirk Muller	LW	80	19	51	70	76	1	7	0	3
Brendan Shanahan	LW	75	29	37	66	141	4	7	0	2
Peter Stastny	C	77	18	42	60	53	0	4	0	3
Claude Lemieux	RW	78	30	17	47	105	-8	10	0	2
Patrik Sundstrom	C	71	15	31	46	48	7	4	1	1
Bruce Driver	D	73	9	36	45	62	11	7	0	2
Alexei Kasatonov	D	78	10	31	41	76	23	1	0	3
Eric Weinrich	D	76	4	34	38	48	10	1	0	0
Doug Brown	RW	58	14	16	30	4	18	0	2	2
Jon Morris	C	53	9	19	28	27	9	1	0	1
Zdeno Ciger	LW	45	8	17	25	8	3	2	0	1
David Maley	LW	64	8	14	22	151	9	1	0	3
Laurie Boschman	C	78	11	9	20	79	-1	0	1	1
Ken Daneyko	D	80	4	16	20	249	-10	1	2	1
Viacheslav Fetisov	D	67	3	16	19	62	5	1	0	0
Pat Conacher	LW	49	5	11	16	27	9	0	0	0
Tommy Albelin	D	47	2	12	14	44	1	1	0	0
Walt Poddubny	LW	14	4	6	10	10	8	0	0	0
Troy Crowder	RW	59	6	3	9	182	-10	0	0	0
Allan Stewart	LW	41	5	2	7	159	-6	0	0	0
Paul Ysebaert	C	11	4	3	7	6	1	1	0	0
Lee Norwood	D	28	3	2	5	87	-1	1	0	0
Jeff Madill	RW	14	4	0	4	46	-1	0	0	0
Myles O'Connor	D	22	3	1	4	41	3	0	0	0
Chris Terreri	G	53	0	3	3	2	0	0	0	0
Jamie Huscroft	D	8	0	1	1	27	1	0	0	0
Dave Marcinyshyn	D	9	0	1	1	21	-1	0	0	0
Jarrod Skalde	C	1	0	1	1	0	0	0	0	0
Perry Anderson	LW	1	0	0	0	5	0	0	0	0
Neil Brady	C	3	0	0	0	0	0	0	0	0
Sean Burke	G	35	0	0	0	18	0	0	0	0
Roland Melanson	G	1	0	0	0	0	0	0	0	0
Jason Miller	LW	1	0	0	0	0	1	0	0	0
Kevin Todd	C	1	0	0	0	0	-1	0	0	0

Goaltending

Player	MIN	GP	W	L	T	GA	GAA	SO	SA	SV	SV%
Chris Terreri	2970	53	24	21	7	144	2.91	1	1348	1204	.893
Sean Burke	1870	35	8	12	8	112	3.59	0	875	763	.872
Roland Melanson	20	1	0	0	0	2	6.00	0	7	5	.714
Team:	4860	80	32	33	15	258	3.19	1	2230	1972	.884

=== Playoffs ===
Scoring

Player	Pos	GP	G	A	Pts	PIM	PPG	SHG	GWG
John MacLean	RW	7	5	3	8	20	1	0	0
Brendan Shanahan	LW	7	3	5	8	12	2	0	0
Peter Stastny	C	7	3	4	7	2	1	0	2
Claude Lemieux	RW	7	4	0	4	34	2	0	1
Doug Brown	RW	7	2	2	4	2	0	1	0
Alexei Kasatonov	D	7	1	3	4	10	0	0	0
Jon Morris	C	5	0	4	4	2	0	0	0
Bruce Driver	D	7	1	2	3	12	1	0	0
Eric Weinrich	D	7	1	2	3	6	1	0	0
Laurie Boschman	C	7	1	1	2	16	0	0	0
Zdeno Ciger	LW	6	0	2	2	4	0	0	0
Pat Conacher	LW	7	0	2	2	2	0	0	0
Jeff Madill	RW	7	0	2	2	8	0	0	0
Kirk Muller	LW	7	0	2	2	10	0	0	0
Tommy Albelin	D	3	0	1	1	2	0	0	0
Perry Anderson	LW	4	0	1	1	10	0	0	0
Ken Daneyko	D	7	0	1	1	10	0	0	0
Viacheslav Fetisov	D	7	0	0	0	17	0	0	0
Jamie Huscroft	D	3	0	0	0	6	0	0	0
Lee Norwood	D	4	0	0	0	18	0	0	0
Patrik Sundstrom	C	2	0	0	0	0	0	0	0
Chris Terreri	G	7	0	0	0	2	0	0	0
Kevin Todd	C	1	0	0	0	6	0	0	0

Goaltending

Player	MIN	GP	W	L	GA	GAA	SO	SA	SV	SV%
Chris Terreri	428	7	3	4	21	2.94	0	216	195	.903
Team:	428	7	3	4	21	2.94	0	216	195	.903

Note: GP = Games played; G = Goals; A = Assists; Pts = Points; +/- = Plus/minus; PIM = Penalty minutes; PPG = Power-play goals; SHG = Short-handed goals; GWG = Game-winning goals
MIN = Minutes played; W = Wins; L = Losses; T = Ties; GA = Goals against; GAA = Goals against average; SO = Shutouts; SA = Shots against; SV = Shots saved; SV% = Save percentage;

== Awards & records ==
=== Awards ===
Regular Season
Player	Award	Awarded
Eric Weinrich	NHL All-Rookie Team – Defense	End of regular season

== Draft picks ==
The Devils' draft picks at the 1990 NHL entry draft.

Rd #	Pick #	Player	Nat	Pos	Team (League)	Notes
1	20	Martin Brodeur	Canada	G	Saint-Hyacinthe Laser (QMJHL)	(Note: The Devils traded their first-round pick (used on Trevor Kidd) and second-round pick (used on Vesa Viitakoski) to Calgary for the Flames' first-round pick (Brodeur), Detroit's second-round pick (Harlock), and Minnesota's second-round pick (Gotziaman) on June 17, 1990.)
2	24	David Harlock	Canada	D	University of Michigan (CCHA)	
2	29	Chris Gotziaman	United States	RW	Roseau H.S. (Minnesota)	
3	53	Mike Dunham	United States	G	Canterbury H.S. (Connecticut)	
3	56	Brad Bombardir	Canada	D	Powell River Kings (BCJHL)	(Note: The Devils traded their 1989 seventh-round pick (used on Doug Evans) and Alain Chevrier to Winnipeg for Steve Rooney and the Jets' 1990 third-round pick (Bombardir) on June 19, 1988. The official Devils transaction page incorrectly lists Evans' pick as 1990.)
4	64	Mike Bodnarchuk	Canada	RW		(Note: The Devils traded their 1990 eight-round pick (used on Alexander Karpovtsev), Joe Cirella and Claude Loiselle to Quebec in exchange for the Nordiques' fourth-round pick (Bodnarchuk) and Walt Poddubny on June 17, 1989.)
5	95	Dean Malkoc	Canada	D	Kamloops Blazers (WHL)	
5	104	Petr Kuchyna	Czechoslovakia	D	HC Jihlava (Czechoslovak Extraliga)	(Note: The Devils traded Jim Korn to Calgary in exchange for the Flames' 1990 fifth-round pick (Kuchyna) on March 6, 1990.)
6	116	Lubomir Kolnik	Czechoslovakia	RW	HC Dukla Trenčín (Czechoslovak Extraliga)	
7	137	Chris McAlpine	United States	D	Roseville H.S. (Minnesota)	
8	158	No eighth-round pick				
9	179	Jaroslav Modry	Czechoslovakia	D	HC České Budějovice (Czechoslovak Extraliga)	
10	200	Corey Schwab	Canada	G	Seattle Thunderbirds (WHL)	
11	221	Valeri Zelepukin	Soviet Union	LW	Khimik Voskresensk (Soviet League)	
12	242	Todd Reirden	United States	D	Tabor Academy (Massachusetts)	
S	16	Mike Haviland	United States	F	Elmira College (NCAA)	

== See also ==
- 1990–91 NHL season
