= George Maneluk =

Canadian ice hockey player

- Born: July 25, 1967 (age 59) Winnipeg, Manitoba, Canada
- Height: 6 ft 0 in (183 cm)
- Weight: 195 lb (88 kg; 13 st 13 lb)
- Position: Goaltender
- Caught: Left
- Played for: New York Islanders
- NHL draft: 76th overall, 1987; New York Islanders
- Playing career: 1988–1996

George Maneluk (born July 25, 1967) is a Canadian former professional ice hockey goaltender who played four games in the National Hockey League for the New York Islanders in the 1990–91 season.

Born in Winnipeg, Manitoba, Maneluk played his junior career for the Brandon Wheat Kings. Maneluk played nine professional seasons, most notably for the Springfield Indians of the American Hockey League, for whom he played parts of five seasons and backstopped the team to its sixth Calder Cup championship in 1990.

== Career statistics ==
=== Regular season and playoffs ===
			Regular season									Playoffs
Season	Team	League	GP	W	L	T	MIN	GA	SO	GAA	SV%	GP	W	L	MIN	GA	SO	GAA	SV%
1984–85	University of Manitoba	CIAU	2	1	1	0	120	14	0	7.00	.763	—	—	—	—	—	—	—	—
1986–87	Brandon Wheat Kings	WHL	58	16	35	4	3258	315	0	5.80	—	—	—	—	—	—	—	—	—
1987–88	Brandon Wheat Kings	WHL	64	24	33	3	3651	297	0	4.88	—	4	1	3	271	22	0	4.87	.880
1987–88	Springfield Indians	AHL	2	0	1	1	125	9	0	4.32	.878	—	—	—	—	—	—	—	—
1987–88	Peoria Rivermen	IHL	3	1	2	0	148	14	0	5.68	.827	1	0	1	60	5	0	5.00	—
1988–89	Springfield Indians	AHL	24	7	13	0	1202	84	0	4.19	.860	—	—	—	—	—	—	—	—
1989–90	Springfield Indians	AHL	27	11	9	1	1382	94	1	4.08	.873	4	2	1	174	9	0	3.10	—
1989–90	Winston-Salem Thunderbirds	ECHL	3	2	0	0	140	11	0	4.71	.882	—	—	—	—	—	—	—	—
1990–91	New York Islanders	NHL	4	2	1	1	140	15	0	6.43	.840	—	—	—	—	—	—	—	—
1990–91	Capital District Islanders	AHL	29	10	14	1	1524	103	1	4.06	.863	—	—	—	—	—	—	—	—
1991–92	New Haven Nighthawks	AHL	54	25	22	0	2863	175	1	3.67	.885	3	1	2	216	13	0	3.61	.892
1992–93	Springfield Indians	AHL	7	4	3	0	343	23	0	4.02	.863	14	6	7	778	53	0	4.09	—
1992–93	Phoenix Roadrunners	IHL	2	1	1	0	120	10	0	5.00	.865	—	—	—	—	—	—	—	—
1992–93	Muskegon Fury	CoHL	27	9	14	1	1494	113	1	4.54	.850	1	0	1	59	6	0	6.10	—
1993–94	Springfield Indians	AHL	31	8	14	6	1515	107	0	4.24	.847	—	—	—	—	—	—	—	—
1994–95	Wichita Thunder	CHL	44	27	10	2	2439	153	2	3.76	.894	9	6	3	476	37	0	4.65	.883
1995–96	Louisiana IceGators	ECHL	36	18	13	2	1969	129	0	3.93	.883	3	0	2	160	14	0	5.25	.827
1995–96	Los Angeles Ice Dogs	IHL	1	0	0	0	9	0	0	0.00	1.000	—	—	—	—	—	—	—	—
NHL totals			4	1	1	0	140	15	0	6.43	.840	—	—	—	—	—	—	—	—

== Awards and achievements ==
- CHL Second All-Star Team (1995)
