= 1990–91 Edmonton Oilers season =

NHL team season

1990–91 Edmonton Oilers
- Division: 3rd Smythe
- Conference: 5th Campbell
- 1990–91 record: 37–37–6
- Home record: 22–15–3
- Road record: 15–22–3
- Goals for: 272
- Goals against: 272

Team information
- General manager: Glen Sather
- Coach: John Muckler
- Captain: Mark Messier
- Alternate captains: Kevin Lowe; Craig MacTavish
- Arena: Northlands Coliseum
- Average attendance: 16,843 (96.2%)
- Minor league affiliates: Cape Breton Oilers (AHL); Knoxville Cherokees (ECHL)

Team leaders
- Goals: Petr Klíma (40)
- Assists: Mark Messier (52)
- Points: Esa Tikkanen (69)
- Penalty minutes: Steve Smith (193)
- Plus/minus: Petr Klíma (+24)
- Wins: Bill Ranford (27)
- Goals against average: Bill Ranford (3.20)

The 1990–91 Edmonton Oilers season was the Oilers' 12th season in the NHL, and they were coming off of their 5th Stanley Cup in the last seven seasons, after defeating the Boston Bruins in the Stanley Cup finals. The Oilers would finish the season with a 37–37–6 record for 80 points, their lowest point total since 1980–81, and Edmonton scored a franchise low 272 goals, however, the Oilers set a franchise record for fewest goals against, with 272. After a 2–11–2 start to the season, the Oilers rebounded and finished 3rd in the Smythe Division and continued their Stanley Cup playoff appearance streak to twelve consecutive seasons.

Prior to the season, long time Oiler Jari Kurri left the team due to a contract dispute signing with Italian club Milano Devils, leaving a big hole on the team's top line. Injuries also hurt the Oilers, as Mark Messier missed 29 games due to injuries, and his 64 points was his lowest total since 1984–85. Messier also matched the lowest goal total of his career with 12, which matched his rookie season total back in 1979–80. Esa Tikkanen led the club in points with 69, while Petr Klíma scored a career high 40 goals to lead Edmonton in that department. Steve Smith would lead the Oilers defense with 54 points, and his 193 penalty minutes led the club.

In goal, Bill Ranford had a solid season, winning a team high 27 games and posting a 3.20 GAA. Grant Fuhr was suspended by the NHL for the season, but the suspension was lifted by the league after 59 games and his completion of a two-week rehab program, finishing out the regular season with a solid 6–4–3 record and a 3.01 GAA.

The Oilers finished the regular season with the fewest short-handed goals allowed (4).

== Season standings ==
Smythe Division
	GP	W	L	T	GF	GA	Pts
**Los Angeles Kings**	80	46	24	10	340	254	102
**Calgary Flames**	80	46	26	8	344	263	100
**Edmonton Oilers**	80	37	37	6	272	272	80
**Vancouver Canucks**	80	28	43	9	243	315	65
Winnipeg Jets	80	26	43	11	260	288	63

Note: GP = Games played, W = Wins, L = Losses, T = Ties, Pts = Points, GF = Goals for, GA = Goals against
Note: Teams that qualified for the playoffs are highlighted in bold.

Campbell Conference
R		Div	GP	W	L	T	GF	GA	Pts
**1**	**p – Chicago Blackhawks**	**NRS**	**80**	**49**	**23**	**8**	**284**	**211**	**106**
**2**	**St. Louis Blues**	**NRS**	**80**	**47**	**22**	**11**	**310**	**250**	**105**
**3**	**Los Angeles Kings**	**SMY**	**80**	**46**	**24**	**10**	**340**	**254**	**102**
**4**	**Calgary Flames**	**SMY**	**80**	**46**	**26**	**8**	**344**	**263**	**100**
**5**	**Edmonton Oilers**	**SMY**	**80**	**37**	**37**	**6**	**272**	**272**	**80**
**6**	**Detroit Red Wings**	**NRS**	**80**	**34**	**38**	**8**	**273**	**298**	**76**
**7**	**Minnesota North Stars**	**NRS**	**80**	**27**	**39**	**14**	**256**	**266**	**68**
**8**	**Vancouver Canucks**	**SMY**	**80**	**28**	**43**	**9**	**243**	**315**	**65**
9	Winnipeg Jets	SMY	80	26	43	11	260	288	63
10	Toronto Maple Leafs	NRS	80	23	46	11	241	318	57

Divisions: NRS – Norris, SMY – Smythe

bold – Qualified for playoffs; p – Won Presidents' Trophy

== Schedule and results ==
1990–91 regular season
October : 2–7–2 (home: 2–4–1; road: 0–3–1)

Game	Date	Visitor	Score	Home	OT	Decision	Attendance	Record	Pts	Recap
1	October 6	Winnipeg Jets	3 – 3	Edmonton Oilers	OT	Ranford	17,502	0–0–1	1	
2	October 7	Toronto Maple Leafs	2 – 3	Edmonton Oilers		Ranford	16,284	1–0–1	3	
3	October 11	Edmonton Oilers	5 – 5	Los Angeles Kings	OT	Ranford	13,831	1–0–2	4	
4	October 14	Edmonton Oilers	4 – 5	Vancouver Canucks	OT	Ranford	15,059	1–1–2	4	
5	October 16	St. Louis Blues	5 – 2	Edmonton Oilers		Ranford	15,908	1–2–2	4	
6	October 19	Boston Bruins	1 – 8	Edmonton Oilers		Ranford	12,553	2–2–2	6	
7	October 21	Calgary Flames	2 – 1	Edmonton Oilers		Ranford	17,054	2–3–2	6	
8	October 24	Edmonton Oilers	1 – 3	Winnipeg Jets		Ranford	12,185	2–4–2	6	
9	October 25	Edmonton Oilers	2 – 4	Calgary Flames		Ranford	20,132	2–5–2	6	
10	October 28	Washington Capitals	1 – 0	Edmonton Oilers		Ranford	15,821	2–6–2	6	
11	October 31	Winnipeg Jets	1 – 0	Edmonton Oilers	OT	Ranford	15,436	2–7–2	6	

November: 5–7–0 (home: 3–2–0; road: 2–5–0)

Game	Date	Visitor	Score	Home	OT	Decision	Attendance	Record	Pts	Recap
12	November 3	New Jersey Devils	5 – 2	Edmonton Oilers		Ranford	16,547	2–8–2	6	
13	November 6	Edmonton Oilers	1 – 2	St. Louis Blues		Ranford		2–9–2	6	
14	November 8	Edmonton Oilers	3 – 5	Chicago Blackhawks		Ranford	17,779	2–10–2	6	
15	November 10	Edmonton Oilers	4 – 7	Los Angeles Kings		Ranford	16,005	2–11–2	6	
16	November 14	Vancouver Canucks	3 – 5	Edmonton Oilers		Ranford	15,832	3–11–2	8	
17	November 16	Buffalo Sabres	2 – 4	Edmonton Oilers		Ranford	16,563	4–11–2	10	
18	November 18	New York Islanders	1 – 3	Edmonton Oilers		Ranford	16,721	5–11–2	12	
19	November 20	Chicago Blackhawks	3 – 1	Edmonton Oilers		Ranford	16,474	5–12–2	12	
20	November 23	Edmonton Oilers	2 – 3	Buffalo Sabres	OT	Ranford	16,325	5–13–2	12	
21	November 24	Edmonton Oilers	4 – 1	Toronto Maple Leafs		Takko	16,382	6–13–2	14	
22	November 27	Edmonton Oilers	7 – 3	Pittsburgh Penguins		Ranford	15,789	7–13–2	16	
23	November 29	Edmonton Oilers	2 – 4	Boston Bruins		Ranford	14,448	7–14–2	16	

December: 11–3–0 (home: 7–1–0; road: 4–2–0)

Game	Date	Visitor	Score	Home	OT	Decision	Attendance	Record	Pts	Recap
24	December 1	Edmonton Oilers	4 – 2	Hartford Whalers		Takko	12,184	8–14–2	18	
25	December 2	Edmonton Oilers	6 – 3	Philadelphia Flyers		Ranford	17,382	9–14–2	20	
26	December 5	Quebec Nordiques	2 – 3	Edmonton Oilers		Takko	15,300	10–14–2	22	
27	December 7	New York Rangers	3 – 4	Edmonton Oilers		Ranford	17,135	11–14–2	24	
28	December 9	Calgary Flames	3 – 2	Edmonton Oilers		Ranford	17,503	11–15–2	24	
29	December 12	Vancouver Canucks	4 – 5	Edmonton Oilers		Ranford	15,457	12–15–2	26	
30	December 15	Edmonton Oilers	3 – 8	Los Angeles Kings		Ranford	16,005	12–16–2	26	
31	December 18	Los Angeles Kings	3 – 4	Edmonton Oilers		Takko	17,503	13–16–2	28	
32	December 20	Edmonton Oilers	4 – 7	Vancouver Canucks		Takko	15,725	13–17–2	28	
33	December 22	Edmonton Oilers	6 – 2	Calgary Flames		Ranford	20,132	14–17–2	30	
34	December 23	Vancouver Canucks	3 – 4	Edmonton Oilers		Ranford	17,348	15–17–2	32	
35	December 27	Calgary Flames	1 – 4	Edmonton Oilers		Ranford	17,503	16–17–2	34	
36	December 28	Edmonton Oilers	5 – 2	Vancouver Canucks		Ranford	16,123	17–17–2	36	
37	December 30	Hartford Whalers	3 – 4	Edmonton Oilers		Ranford	16,913	18–17–2	38	

January: 7–5–1 (home: 3–2–0; road: 4–3–1)

Game	Date	Visitor	Score	Home	OT	Decision	Attendance	Record	Pts	Recap
38	January 2	Montreal Canadiens	3 – 0	Edmonton Oilers		Ranford	17,503	18–18–2	38	
39	January 4	Detroit Red Wings	2 – 3	Edmonton Oilers		Ranford	17,212	19–18–2	40	
40	January 8	Edmonton Oilers	1 – 6	Pittsburgh Penguins		Ranford	15,728	19–19–2	40	
41	January 9	Edmonton Oilers	3 – 5	Detroit Red Wings		Ranford	19,857	19–20–2	40	
42	January 12	Edmonton Oilers	5 – 4	New Jersey Devils	OT	Ranford	12,995	20–20–2	42	
43	January 13	Edmonton Oilers	5 – 3	Philadelphia Flyers		Ranford	17,382	21–20–2	44	
44	January 15	Edmonton Oilers	2 – 2	New York Rangers	OT	Ranford	15,391	21–20–3	45	
45	January 17	Edmonton Oilers	6 – 1	New York Islanders		Ranford	10,476	22–20–3	47	
46	January 22	Los Angeles Kings	2 – 4	Edmonton Oilers		Ranford	17,503	23–20–3	49	
47	January 23	Edmonton Oilers	5 – 6	Vancouver Canucks		Takko	15,716	23–21–3	49	
48	January 25	New York Rangers	4 – 3	Edmonton Oilers		Takko	17,208	23–22–3	49	
49	January 27	Edmonton Oilers	3 – 2	Winnipeg Jets		Ranford	12,892	24–22–3	51	
50	January 30	Vancouver Canucks	4 – 9	Edmonton Oilers		Ranford	12,892	25–22–3	53	

February: 5–8–1 (home: 3–2–1; road: 2–6–0)

Game	Date	Visitor	Score	Home	OT	Decision	Attendance	Record	Pts	Recap
51	February 1	Chicago Blackhawks	3 – 4	Edmonton Oilers	OT	Ranford	17,503	26–22–3	55	
52	February 3	Edmonton Oilers	3 – 2	Buffalo Sabres		Ranford	15,489	27–22–3	57	
53	February 5	Edmonton Oilers	5 – 6	Boston Bruins	OT	Ranford	14,448	27–23–3	57	
54	February 6	Edmonton Oilers	1 – 5	Hartford Whalers		Reddick	11,364	27–24–3	57	
55	February 8	Edmonton Oilers	3 – 6	Washington Capitals		Takko	17,318	27–25–3	57	
56	February 11	Pittsburgh Penguins	5 – 7	Edmonton Oilers		Ranford	16,588	28–25–3	59	
57	February 12	St. Louis Blues	4 – 2	Edmonton Oilers		Reddick	16,249	28–26–3	59	
58	February 14	Los Angeles Kings	4 – 2	Edmonton Oilers		Ranford	17,503	28–27–3	59	
59	February 16	Edmonton Oilers	2 – 3	Toronto Maple Leafs		Ranford	16,382	28–28–3	59	
60	February 18	Edmonton Oilers	4 – 0	New Jersey Devils		Fuhr	11,617	29–28–3	61	
61	February 20	Edmonton Oilers	1 – 5	Minnesota North Stars		Ranford	6,195	29–29–3	61	
62	February 22	Detroit Red Wings	5 – 5	Edmonton Oilers	OT	Fuhr		29–29–4	62	
63	February 24	Quebec Nordiques	3 – 6	Edmonton Oilers		Ranford	16,375	30–29–4	64	
64	February 27	Edmonton Oilers	2 – 4	Calgary Flames		Fuhr	20,132	30–30–4	64	

March: 7–7–2 (home: 4–4–1; road: 3–3–1)

Game	Date	Visitor	Score	Home	OT	Decision	Attendance	Record	Pts	Recap
65	March 1	Minnesota North Stars	1 – 1	Edmonton Oilers	OT	Fuhr	16,516	30–30–5	65	
66	March 2	Montreal Canadiens	2 – 1	Edmonton Oilers	OT	Fuhr		30–31–5	65	
67	March 5	Edmonton Oilers	5 – 4	Winnipeg Jets		Fuhr	11,568	31–31–5	67	
68	March 6	Edmonton Oilers	1 – 5	Minnesota North Stars		Ranford	6,882	31–32–5	67	
69	March 8	Philadelphia Flyers	4 – 5	Edmonton Oilers		Fuhr	17,503	32–32–5	69	
70	March 10	Washington Capitals	5 – 3	Edmonton Oilers		Ranford	16,482	32–33–5	69	
71	March 13	New York Islanders	1 – 2	Edmonton Oilers		Fuhr	16,253	33–33–5	71	
72	March 15	Edmonton Oilers	3 – 4	Winnipeg Jets		Fuhr	14,768	33–34–5	71	
73	March 17	Edmonton Oilers	4 – 2	Montreal Canadiens		Fuhr	16,336	34–34–5	73	
74	March 19	Edmonton Oilers	7 – 6	Quebec Nordiques	OT	Ranford	15,194	35–34–5	75	
75	March 23	Winnipeg Jets	3 – 0	Edmonton Oilers		Ranford	17,503	35–35–5	75	
76	March 24	Los Angeles Kings	4 – 3	Edmonton Oilers		Fuhr	17,503	35–36–5	75	
77	March 26	Edmonton Oilers	0 – 2	Los Angeles Kings		Ranford	16,005	35–37–5	75	
78	March 28	Edmonton Oilers	4 – 4	Calgary Flames	OT	Fuhr	20,132	35–37–6	76	
79	March 29	Calgary Flames	5 – 6	Edmonton Oilers	OT	Ranford	17,503	36–37–6	78	
80	March 31	Winnipeg Jets	3 – 6	Edmonton Oilers		Fuhr	16,926	37–37–6	80	

Legend: Win (2 points) Loss (0 points) Tie (1 point)

== Playoffs ==
In the playoffs, the Oilers faced their Battle of Alberta rivals, the Calgary Flames, who finished with 20 more points than they did, were huge favourites to win the series. The series went the full 7 games, with the Oilers winning the series in OT at the Saddledome in Calgary to advance to the division finals. There, they met the Los Angeles Kings, who finished 22 points better than Edmonton, however, the Oilers overtime magic continued after dropping game one, as Edmonton won 2 games in a row in double OT to take the series lead. Edmonton won the series in 6 games, clinching the series in OT. Having defeated the top two teams of their division, the Oilers advanced to the Conference Finals, facing the even more surprising Minnesota North Stars, who finished the season 12 games under .500, yet defeated the Presidents' Trophy winning Chicago Blackhawks and the St. Louis Blues, who finished 1 point behind Chicago, to make it to the 3rd round against Edmonton. The North Stars cinderella playoff run continued, as they defeated the Oilers in 5 games, ending Edmonton's chance for back-to-back Stanley Cups.

1991 Stanley Cup playoffs
Smythe Division Semifinals vs. (S2) Calgary Flames – Oilers win 4–3

Game	Date	Visitor	Score	Home	OT	Decision	Attendance	Series	Recap
1	April 4	Edmonton Oilers	3 – 1	Calgary Flames		Fuhr	20,176	1–0	
2	April 6	Edmonton Oilers	1 – 3	Calgary Flames		Fuhr	20,176	1–1	
3	April 8	Calgary Flames	3 – 4	Edmonton Oilers		Fuhr	17,242	2–1	
4	April 10	Calgary Flames	2 – 5	Edmonton Oilers		Fuhr	17,503	3–1	
5	April 12	Edmonton Oilers	3 – 5	Calgary Flames		Fuhr	20,176	3–2	
6	April 14	Calgary Flames	2 – 1	Edmonton Oilers	OT	Fuhr	17,503	3–3	
7	April 16	Edmonton Oilers	5 – 4	Calgary Flames	OT	Fuhr	20,176	4–3	

Smythe Division Semifinals vs. (S1) Los Angeles Kings – Oilers win 4–2

Game	Date	Visitor	Score	Home	OT	Decision	Attendance	Series	Recap
1	April 18	Edmonton Oilers	3 – 4	Los Angeles Kings	OT	Ranford	16,005	0–1	
2	April 20	Edmonton Oilers	4 – 3	Los Angeles Kings	2OT	Fuhr	16,005	1–1	
3	April 22	Los Angeles Kings	3 – 4	Edmonton Oilers	2OT	Fuhr	17,503	2–1	
4	April 24	Los Angeles Kings	2 – 4	Edmonton Oilers		Fuhr	17,503	3–1	
5	April 26	Edmonton Oilers	2 – 5	Los Angeles Kings		Fuhr	16,005	3–2	
6	April 28	Los Angeles Kings	3 – 4	Edmonton Oilers	OT	Fuhr	17,503	4–2	

Campbell Conference Finals vs. (N4) Minnesota North Stars – North Stars win 4–1

Game	Date	Visitor	Score	Home	OT	Decision	Attendance	Series	Recap
1	May 2	Minnesota North Stars	3 – 1	Edmonton Oilers		Fuhr	17,082	0–1	
2	May 4	Minnesota North Stars	2 – 7	Edmonton Oilers		Fuhr	17,500	1–1	
3	May 6	Edmonton Oilers	3 – 7	Minnesota North Stars		Ranford	15,073	1–2	
4	May 8	Edmonton Oilers	1 – 5	Minnesota North Stars		Fuhr	15,274	1–3	
5	May 10	Minnesota North Stars	3 – 2	Edmonton Oilers		Fuhr	17,503	1–4	

Legend: Win Loss

== Season stats ==
=== Scoring leaders ===
Player	GP	G	A	Pts	PIM
Esa Tikkanen	79	27	42	69	85
Petr Klíma	70	40	28	68	113
Mark Messier	53	12	52	64	34
Joe Murphy	80	27	35	62	35
Craig Simpson	75	30	27	57	66

=== Goaltending ===
Player	GP	TOI	W	L	T	GA	SO	Save %	GAA
Grant Fuhr	13	778	6	4	3	39	1	.897	3.01
Bill Ranford	60	3415	27	27	3	182	0	.893	3.20
Kari Takko	11	529	4	4	0	37	0	.867	4.20
Pokey Reddick	2	120	0	2	0	9	0	.847	4.50

== Playoff stats ==
=== Scoring leaders ===
Player	GP	G	A	Pts	PIM
Esa Tikkanen	18	12	8	20	24
Craig Simpson	18	5	11	16	12
Mark Messier	18	4	11	15	16
Petr Klíma	18	7	6	13	16
Glenn Anderson	18	6	7	13	41

=== Goaltending ===
Player	GP	TOI	W	L	GA	SO	Save %	GAA
Grant Fuhr	17	1019	8	7	51	0	.895	3.00
Bill Ranford	3	135	1	2	8	0	.897	3.56

== Awards and records ==
=== Milestones ===
Regular Season
Player	Milestone	Reached
Jeff Beukeboom	200th NHL Game	October 6, 1990
Anatoli Semenov	1st NHL Game	October 6, 1990
Mark Messier	800th NHL Game	October 7, 1990
Anatoli Semenov	1st NHL Goal; 1st NHL Assist; 1st NHL Point	October 11, 1990
Esa Tikkanen	5th NHL Hat-trick	October 14, 1990
Dave Brown	400th NHL Game	October 16, 1990
Kelly Buchberger	500th NHL PIM	October 19, 1990
Steve Smith	1st NHL Gordie Howe hat trick 900th NHL PIM	October 19, 1990
Craig MacTavish	400th NHL PIM	October 24, 1990
Tomas Srsen	1st NHL Game	October 31, 1990
David Haas	1st NHL Game	November 6, 1990
David Haas	1st NHL Goal; 1st NHL Point	November 8, 1990
Mark Messier	600th NHL Assist	November 24, 1990
Craig Simpson	400th NHL Game	December 5, 1990
Igor Vyazmikin	1st NHL Game	December 12, 1990
Petr Klíma	300th NHL Point	December 15, 1990
Igor Vyazmikin	1st NHL Goal; 1st NHL Point	December 18, 1990
Chris Joseph	100th NHL PIM	December 20, 1990
Mark Messier	1,100th NHL PIM	December 20, 1990
Craig MacTavish	??? NHL Hat-trick	December 22, 1990
Geoff Smith	100th NHL Game	December 23, 1990
Dave Brown	1,300th NHL PIM	December 27, 1990
Steve Smith	1,000th NHL PIM	December 27, 1990
Kevin Lowe	1,000th NHL PIM	December 30, 1990
Esa Tikkanen	600th NHL PIM	January 4, 1991
Jeff Beukeboom	600th NHL PIM	January 9, 1991
Steve Smith	200th NHL Point	January 12, 1991
Glenn Anderson	400th NHL Goal	January 13, 1991
Mark Messier	1,000th NHL Point	January 13, 1991
Esa Tikkanen	200th NHL Assist	January 13, 1991
Chris Joseph	100th NHL Game	January 17, 1991
Petr Klíma	300th NHL PIM; 400th NHL Game	January 25, 1991
Joe Murphy	200th NHL Game	January 25, 1991
Glenn Anderson	800th NHL Game	January 30, 1991
Kelly Buchberger	600th NHL PIM	January 30, 1991
Adam Graves	1st NHL Gordie Howe hat trick	January 30, 1991
Petr Klíma	??? NHL Hat-trick	January 30, 1991
Martin Gélinas	100th NHL Game	February 3, 1991
Petr Klíma	??? NHL Hat-trick	February 5, 1991
Ken Linseman	800th NHL Point	February 5, 1991
Craig Simpson	500th NHL PIM	February 6, 1991
Adam Graves	300th NHL PIM	February 8, 1991
Geoff Smith	100th NHL PIM	February 8, 1991
Ken Linseman	1,700th NHL PIM	February 11, 1991
Shaun Van Allen	1st NHL Game	February 18, 1991
Dan Currie	1st NHL Game	February 22, 1991
Kevin Lowe	900th NHL Game	February 22, 1991
Joe Murphy	100th NHL Point	February 22, 1991
Adam Graves	200th NHL Game	February 24, 1991
Esa Tikkanen	400th NHL Game	February 24, 1991
Kelly Buchberger	200th NHL Game	March 24, 1991
Charlie Huddy	500th NHL PIM	March 28, 1991
Petr Klíma	??? NHL Hat-trick	March 31, 1991

Playoffs
Player	Milestone	Reached
Mark Messier	150th NHL Game	April 6, 1991
Craig Simpson	50th NHL Game	April 6, 1991
Glenn Anderson	150th NHL Game	April 10, 1991
Jeff Beukeboom	1st NHL Assist; 1st NHL Point	April 10, 1991
Kelly Buchberger	1st NHL Goal	April 10, 1991
Petr Klíma	50th NHL PIM	April 12, 1991
Kevin Lowe	150th NHL Game	April 12, 1991
Grant Fuhr	100th NHL Game	April 14, 1991
Charlie Huddy	100th NHL PIM	April 14, 1991
Esa Tikkanen	150th NHL PIM	April 14, 1991
Norm Maciver	1st NHL Assist; 1st NHL Point	April 16, 1991
Anatoli Semenov	1st NHL Goal; 1st NHL Point	April 16, 1991
Craig Simpson	50th NHL PIM	April 16, 1991
Esa Tikkanen	2nd NHL Hat-trick	April 16, 1991
Anatoli Semenov	1st NHL Assist	April 20, 1991
Jeff Beukeboom	1st NHL Goal	April 22, 1991
Mark Lamb	50th NHL Game	April 24, 1991
Steve Smith	200th NHL PIM	April 26, 1991
Glenn Anderson	100th NHL Assist	April 28, 1991
Petr Klíma	??? NHL Hat-trick ??? NHL Natural Hat-trick	May 4, 1991
Glenn Anderson	300th NHL PIM	May 8, 1991
Jeff Beukeboom	50th NHL PIM	May 10, 1991
Dave Brown	200th NHL PIM	May 10, 1991

== Transactions ==
=== Trades ===
October 22, 1990	To Boston Bruins Vladimir Ruzicka	To Edmonton Oilers Greg Hawgood
November 10, 1990	To New Jersey Devils 9th round pick in 1991	To Edmonton Oilers Max Middendorf
November 22, 1990	To Minnesota North Stars Bruce Bell; Future considerations	To Edmonton Oilers Kari Takko
March 5, 1991	To Philadelphia Flyers Kim Issel	To Edmonton Oilers Brad Aitken

=== Players acquired ===
Date	Player	Former team
July 1, 1990	Kevin McDonald	Phoenix Roadrunners (IHL)
August 31, 1990	Ken Linseman	Philadelphia Flyers

=== Players lost ===
Date	Player	New team
July 16, 1990	Steve Graves	Los Angeles Kings

=== Waivers ===
Date	Player	Team
October 1, 1990	Randy Gregg	to Vancouver Canucks

== Draft picks ==
Edmonton's draft picks at the 1990 NHL entry draft

Round	#	Player	Nationality	College/Junior/Club team (League)
1	17	Scott Allison	Canada	Prince Albert Raiders (WHL)
2	38	Alexander Legault	Canada	Boston University (NCAA)
3	59	Joe Crowley	United States	Lawrence Academy (USHS)
4	67	Joel Blain	Canada	Hull Olympiques (QMJHL)
5	101	Greg Louder	United States	Cushing Academy (USHS)
6	122	Keijo Säilynoja	Finland	Jokerit (SM-liiga)
7	143	Mike Power	Canada	Western Michigan University (NCAA)
8	164	Roman Mejzlik	Czechoslovakia	Dukla Jihlava (Czech.)
9	185	Richard Žemlička	Czechoslovakia	Sparta Praha (Czech.)
10	206	Petr Korinek	Czechoslovakia	Dukla Jihlava (Czech.)
12	248	Sami Nuutinen	Finland	Kiekko-Espoo (SM-liiga)
S	22	Sandy Galuppo	United States	Boston College (Hockey East)
