= 1991 Stanley Cup playoffs =

Tournament details
- Dates: April 3 – May 25, 1991
- Teams: 16
- Defending champions: Edmonton Oilers

Final positions
- Champions: Pittsburgh Penguins
- Runners-up: Minnesota North Stars

Tournament statistics
- Scoring leader(s): Mario Lemieux (Penguins) (44 points)

Awards
- MVP: Mario Lemieux (Penguins)

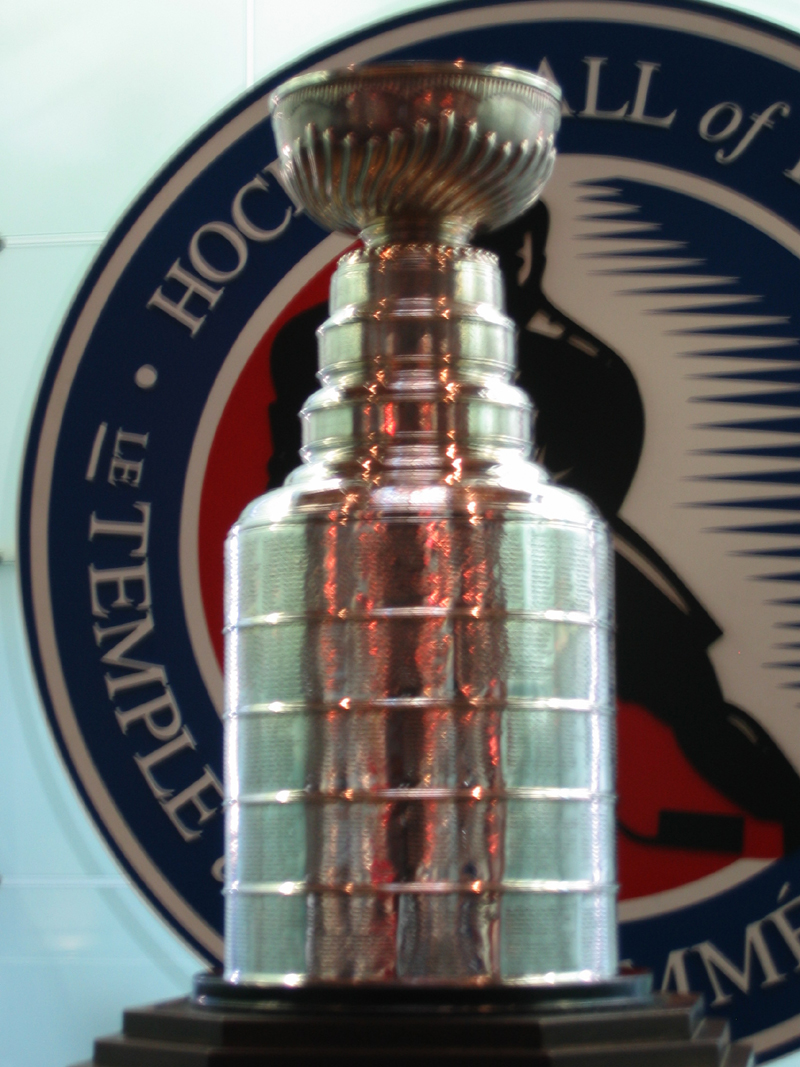
The Stanley Cup

The 1991 Stanley Cup playoffs for the National Hockey League (NHL) championship began on April 3, 1991, following the 1990–91 regular season. The 16 teams that qualified, from the top four teams of the four divisions, played best-of-seven series with re-seeding after the division finals. The Conference Champions played a best-of-seven series for the Stanley Cup.

This was the first of the 25 consecutive years in which the Detroit Red Wings qualified for the Stanley Cup playoffs until their streak finally ended in 2017. Their streak is tied for the third longest in NHL history, and while it was running, it was the longest active playoff appearance streak in the four major American professional sports.

The finals concluded on May 25 with the Pittsburgh Penguins winning the Stanley Cup for the first time in franchise history, defeating the Minnesota North Stars in the final series four games to two. Pittsburgh forward Mario Lemieux was awarded the Conn Smythe Trophy as Most Valuable Player of the playoffs.

This was the first NHL playoffs without any series sweeps since the 1973 playoffs. In addition, this season set the record for most playoff games played with 92, which stood until 2014.

== Playoff seeds ==
The top four teams in each division qualified for the playoffs, as follows:

=== Prince of Wales Conference ===
==== Adams Division ====
1. Boston Bruins, Adams Division champions, Prince of Wales Conference regular season champions – 100 points
2. Montreal Canadiens – 89 points
3. Buffalo Sabres – 81 points
4. Hartford Whalers – 73 points

==== Patrick Division ====
1. Pittsburgh Penguins, Patrick Division champions – 88 points
2. New York Rangers – 85 points
3. Washington Capitals – 81 points
4. New Jersey Devils – 79 points

=== Clarence Campbell Conference ===
==== Norris Division ====
1. Chicago Blackhawks, Norris Division champions, Clarence Campbell Conference regular season champions, Presidents' Trophy winners – 106 points
2. St. Louis Blues – 105 points
3. Detroit Red Wings – 76 points
4. Minnesota North Stars – 68 points

==== Smythe Division ====
1. Los Angeles Kings, Smythe Division champions – 102 points
2. Calgary Flames – 100 points
3. Edmonton Oilers – 80 points
4. Vancouver Canucks – 65 points

== Playoff bracket ==
In the division semifinals, the fourth seeded team in each division played against the division winner from their division. The other series matched the second and third place teams from the divisions. The two winning teams from each division's semifinals then met in the division finals. The two division winners of each conference then played in the conference finals. The two conference winners then advanced to the Stanley Cup Final.

In each round, teams competed in a best-of-seven series following a 2–2–1–1–1 format (scores in the bracket indicate the number of games won in each best-of-seven series). Home ice advantage was awarded to the team that had the better regular season record, and played at home for games one and two (and games five and seven, if necessary); the other team then played at home for games three and four (and game six, if necessary).

Division semifinals	Division finals
A1	Boston	4
A4	Hartford	2
A1	Boston	4
A2	Montreal	3
A2	Montreal	4
A3	Buffalo	2
Prince of Wales Conference
P1	Pittsburgh	4
P4	New Jersey	3
P1	Pittsburgh	4
P3	Washington	1
P2	NY Rangers	2
P3	Washington	4
N1	Chicago	2
N4	Minnesota	4
N4	Minnesota	4
N2	St. Louis	2
N2	St. Louis	4
N3	Detroit	3
Clarence Campbell Conference
S1	Los Angeles	4
S4	Vancouver	2
S1	Los Angeles	2
S3	Edmonton	4
S2	Calgary	3
S3	Edmonton	4

Conference finals
A1	Boston	2
P1	Pittsburgh	4
N4	Minnesota	4
S3	Edmonton	1

Stanley Cup Final
P1	Pittsburgh	4
N4	Minnesota	2

== Division semifinals ==
=== Prince of Wales Conference ===
==== (A1) Boston Bruins vs. (A4) Hartford Whalers ====
This was the second playoff meeting between these two teams. This was a rematch of last year's Adams Division Semifinals in which Boston won in seven games.

April 3	Hartford Whalers	5–2	Boston Bruins	Boston Garden	Recap
Pat Verbeek (1) – pp – 14:11		First period	00:23 – Jeff Lazaro (1)
Kevin Dineen (1) – 02:18; Rob Brown (1) – pp – 09:37		Second period	14:45 – pp – Petri Skriko (1)
John Cullen (1) – 15:49; Paul Cyr (1) – 16:17		Third period	No scoring
Peter Sidorkiewicz 26 saves / 28 shots		Goalie stats	Andy Moog 19 saves / 24 shots

April 5	Hartford Whalers	3–4	Boston Bruins	Boston Garden	Recap
Mark Hunter (1) – 05:08; Pat Verbeek (2) – pp – 18:55		First period	00:13 – Petri Skriko (2)
Randy Ladouceur (1) – 18:12		Second period	09:22 – pp – Cam Neely (1)
No scoring		Third period	11:39 – Cam Neely (2); 16:38 – Cam Neely (3)
Peter Sidorkiewicz 36 saves / 40 shots		Goalie stats	Andy Moog 24 saves / 27 shots

April 7	Boston Bruins	6–3	Hartford Whalers	Hartford Civic Center	Recap
Ray Bourque (1) – pp – 11:07		First period	No scoring
Glen Wesley (1) – pp – 10:38		Second period	06:19 – pp – Mark Hunter (2)
Garry Galley (1) – 06:49; Dave Christian (1) – 07:07; Bob Sweeney (1) – 10:05; Craig Janney (1) – pp – 14:08		Third period	01:59 – Pat Verbeek (3); 15:21 – sh – Terry Yake (1)
Andy Moog 22 saves / 25 shots		Goalie stats	Peter Sidorkiewicz 17 saves / 23 shots

April 9	Boston Bruins	3–4	Hartford Whalers	Hartford Civic Center	Recap
Dave Christian (2) – 15:30; Petri Skriko (3) – pp – 16:57		First period	02:40 – John Cullen (2); 03:39 – pp – Mark Hunter (3); 12:15 – pp – Mark Hunter (4); 15:55 – Zarley Zalapski (1)
No scoring		Second period	No scoring
Ken Hodge Jr. (1) – 14:28		Third period	No scoring
Andy Moog 30 saves / 34 shots		Goalie stats	Peter Sidorkiewicz 32 saves / 35 shots

April 11	Hartford Whalers	1–6	Boston Bruins	Boston Garden	Recap
No scoring		First period	No scoring
Brad Shaw (1) – 07:16		Second period	No scoring
No scoring		Third period	01:20 – pp – Ray Bourque (2); 01:36 – Dave Christian (3); 08:05 – Jeff Lazaro (2); 10:20 – pp – Cam Neely (4); 16:57 – pp – Cam Neely (5); 17:53 – pp – Jim Wiemer (1)
Peter Sidorkiewicz 26 saves / 32 shots		Goalie stats	Andy Moog 25 saves / 26 shots

April 13	Boston Bruins	3–1	Hartford Whalers	Hartford Civic Center	Recap
Nevin Markwart (1) – 03:17; Bob Sweeney (2) – 08:50		First period	No scoring
Dave Christian (4) – 02:34		Second period	No scoring
No scoring		Third period	13:01 – Mark Hunter (5)
Andy Moog 31 saves / 32 shots		Goalie stats	Peter Sidorkiewicz 13 saves / 16 shots

Boston won series 4–2

==== (A2) Montreal Canadiens vs. (A3) Buffalo Sabres ====
This was fifth playoff series between these two teams, and were meeting for the second straight year. Both teams split their previous four playoff meetings. Montreal won last year's Adams Division Semifinals in six games.

April 3	Buffalo Sabres	5–7	Montreal Canadiens	Montreal Forum	Recap
Benoit Hogue (1) – 01:48; Grant Ledyard (1) – 02:12		First period	10:35 – Sylvain Lefebvre (1); 17:14 – pp – Russ Courtnall (1); 18:07 – pp – Mathieu Schneider (1); 18:33 – Russ Courtnall (2)
Pierre Turgeon (1) – pp – 09:23		Second period	02:06 – Stephane Richer (1); 17:25 – Brent Gilchrist (1)
Rick Vaive (1) – pp – 05:030; Kevin Haller (1) – 10:22		Third period	02:14 – pp – Denis Savard (1)
Darcy Wakaluk 20 saves / 22 shots Daren Puppa 10 saves / 15 shots		Goalie stats	Patrick Roy 24 saves / 29 shots

April 5	Buffalo Sabres	4–5	Montreal Canadiens	Montreal Forum	Recap
Uwe Krupp (1) – pp – 02:050		First period	No scoring
Pierre Turgeon (2) – 13:44		Second period	05:09 – Brent Gilchrist (2); 07:36 – pp – Mike McPhee (1)
Dale Hawerchuk (1) – 02:06; Darrin Shannon (1) – 04:52		Third period	00:36 – Russ Courtnall (3); 09:51 – Stephane Richer (2); 18:39 – Guy Carbonneau (1)
Daren Puppa 26 saves / 31 shots Darcy Wakaluk 0 saves / 0 shots		Goalie stats	Patrick Roy 23 saves / 27 shots

April 7	Montreal Canadiens	4–5	Buffalo Sabres	Buffalo Memorial Auditorium	Recap
Shayne Corson (1) – pp – 04:07; Brent Gilchrist (3) – 09:56; Russ Courtnall (4) – pp – 11:47		First period	02:20 – Tony Tanti (1); 05:38 – sh – Christian Ruuttu (1)
Brent Gilchrist (4) – 17:58		Second period	04:20 – Benoit Hogue (2); 11:14 – Grant Ledyard (2)
No scoring		Third period	02:38 – Mike Ramsey (1)
Patrick Roy 28 saves / 33 shots		Goalie stats	Clint Malarchuk 18 saves / 22 shots

April 9	Montreal Canadiens	4–6	Buffalo Sabres	Buffalo Memorial Auditorium	Recap
Eric Desjardins (1) – pp – 05:23; Stephane Richer (3) – 05:31		First period	05:59 – Benoit Hogue (3); 08:01 – Dave Andreychuk (1); 12:30 – Pierre Turgeon (3)
Shayne Corson (2) – 04:10; Stephane Richer (4) – 14:40		Second period	00:16 – pp – Tony Tanti (2); 01:44 – Rob Ray (1)
No scoring		Third period	06:18 – pp – Dale Hawerchuk (2)
Patrick Roy 26 saves / 30 shots Andre Racicot 11 saves / 13 shots		Goalie stats	Clint Malarchuk 33 saves / 37 shots

April 11	Buffalo Sabres	3–4	OT	Montreal Canadiens	Montreal Forum	Recap
Lou Franceschetti (1) – 08:12		First period		02:14 – Mike Keane (1); 06:42 – Brian Skrudland (1)
Grant Ledyard (3) – 04:54		Second period		09:49 – Mike Keane (2)
Dave Andreychuk (2) – pp – 16:55		Third period		No scoring
No scoring		First overtime period		05:56 – Russ Courtnall (5)
Clint Malarchuk 24 saves / 28 shots		Goalie stats		Patrick Roy 29 saves / 32 shots

April 13	Montreal Canadiens	5–1	Buffalo Sabres	Buffalo Memorial Auditorium	Recap
No scoring		First period	No scoring
Brent Gilchrist (5) – 03:06; Shayne Corson (3) – sh – 14:15; Shayne Corson (4) – pp – 15:35		Second period	12:58 – sh – Dave Snuggerud (1)
Denis Savard (2) – 00:39; Stephane Richer (5) – pp – 09:19		Third period	No scoring
Patrick Roy 23 saves / 24 shots Andre Racicot 1 save / 1 shots		Goalie stats	Clint Malarchuk 24 saves / 29 shots

Montreal won series 4–2

==== (P1) Pittsburgh Penguins vs. (P4) New Jersey Devils ====
This was the first playoff meeting between these two teams.

April 3	New Jersey Devils	3–1	Pittsburgh Penguins	Civic Arena	Recap
No scoring		First period	No scoring
Peter Stastny (1) – pp – 15:32		Second period	10:48 – pp – Mario Lemieux (1)
Peter Stastny (2) – 04:12; Laurie Boschman (1) – 05:02		Third period	No scoring
Chris Terreri 26 saves / 27 shots		Goalie stats	Tom Barrasso 32 saves / 35 shots

April 5	New Jersey Devils	4–5	OT	Pittsburgh Penguins	Civic Arena	Recap
John MacLean (1) – 02:50		First period		06:54 – pp – Kevin Stevens (1)
John MacLean (2) – 01:44; Brendan Shanahan (1) – 11:47		Second period		10:32 – Paul Coffey (1); 17:01 – Phil Bourque (1)
Alexei Kasatonov (1) – 04:06		Third period		03:21 – Troy Loney (1)
No scoring		First overtime period		08:52 – Jaromir Jagr (1)
Chris Terreri 21 saves / 26 shots		Goalie stats		Tom Barrasso 36 saves / 40 shots

April 7	Pittsburgh Penguins	4–3	New Jersey Devils	Brendan Byrne Arena	Recap
Mark Recchi (1) – pp – 04:56		First period	12:32 – pp – Brendan Shanahan (2)
Bob Errey (1) – 02:05		Second period	13:22 – pp – Brendan Shanahan (3)
Joe Mullen (1) – 03:15; Mark Recchi (2) – 19:10		Third period	14:46 – sh – Doug Brown (1)
Tom Barrasso 33 saves / 36 shots		Goalie stats	Chris Terreri 30 saves / 34 shots

April 9	Pittsburgh Penguins	1–4	New Jersey Devils	Brendan Byrne Arena	Recap
No scoring		First period	06:54 – Claude Lemieux (1); 07:38 – Peter Stastny (3)
No scoring		Second period	No scoring
Mario Lemieux (2) – pp – 04:41		Third period	16:42 – John MacLean (3); 18:43 – pp – Claude Lemieux (2)
Tom Barrasso 30 saves / 34 shots		Goalie stats	Chris Terreri 28 saves / 29 shots

April 11	New Jersey Devils	4–2	Pittsburgh Penguins	Civic Arena	Recap
John MacLean (4) – pp – 03:20; Bruce Driver (1) – pp – 13:15		First period	No scoring
No scoring		Second period	No scoring
Claude Lemieux (3) – pp – 12:59; Doug Brown (2) – 19:38		Third period	00:54 – Ron Francis (1); 03:41 – Larry Murphy (1)
Chris Terreri 39 saves / 41 shots		Goalie stats	Tom Barrasso 20 saves / 23 shots

April 13	Pittsburgh Penguins	4–3	New Jersey Devils	Brendan Byrne Arena	Recap
Kevin Stevens (2) – 10:49; Kevin Stevens (3) – pp – 13:17; Jaromir Jagr (2) – pp – 19:37		First period	03:29 – John MacLean (5)
Ron Francis (2) – 06:42		Second period	12:32 – pp – Eric Weinrich (1); 13:48 – Claude Lemieux (4)
No scoring		Third period	No scoring
Frank Pietrangelo 28 saves / 31 shots		Goalie stats	Chris Terreri 19 saves / 23 shots

April 15	New Jersey Devils	0–4	Pittsburgh Penguins	Civic Arena	Recap
No scoring		First period	06:17 – Jiri Hrdina (1); 13:06 – pp – Mario Lemieux (3)
No scoring		Second period	00:29 – Jiri Hrdina (2)
No scoring		Third period	00:56 – Paul Coffey (2)
Chris Terreri 32 saves / 36 shots		Goalie stats	Frank Pietrangelo 27 saves / 27 shots

Pittsburgh won series 4–3

==== (P2) New York Rangers vs. (P3) Washington Capitals ====
This was the third playoff series meeting between these two teams, and were meeting for the second straight year. Both teams split the previous two meetings. Washington won last year's Patrick Division Finals in five games.

April 3	Washington Capitals	1–2	New York Rangers	Madison Square Garden	Recap
No scoring		First period	No scoring
No scoring		Second period	04:20 – Jan Erixon (1); 16:58 – Bernie Nicholls (1)
Michal Pivonka (1) – 18:27		Third period	No scoring
Don Beaupre 28 saves / 30 shots		Goalie stats	Mike Richter 28 saves / 29 shots

April 5	Washington Capitals	3–0	New York Rangers	Madison Square Garden	Recap
Dino Ciccarelli (1) – pp – 01:40		First period	No scoring
No scoring		Second period	No scoring
Kelly Miller (1) – sh – 05:24; Michal Pivonka (2) – 19:34		Third period	No scoring
Don Beaupre 36 saves / 36 shots		Goalie stats	Mike Richter 29 saves / 31 shots

April 7	New York Rangers	6–0	Washington Capitals	Capital Centre	Recap
Kris King (1) – 08:07; Mike Gartner (1) – pp – 19:29		First period	No scoring
Bernie Nicholls (2) – 12:17; Mark Janssens (1) – 15:47		Second period	No scoring
Bernie Nicholls (3) – 06:34; Darren Turcotte (1) – pp – 17:15		Third period	No scoring
Mike Richter 37 saves / 37 shots		Goalie stats	Don Beaupre 23 saves / 27 shots Mike Liut 9 saves / 11 shots

April 9	New York Rangers	2–3	Washington Capitals	Capital Centre	Recap
Bernie Nicholls (4) – 04:04		First period	No scoring
No scoring		Second period	00:25 – Kevin Hatcher (1); 15:31 – Dave Tippett (1)
Mark Janssens (2) – 14:32		Third period	09:27 – Alan May (1)
Mike Richter 23 saves / 26 shots		Goalie stats	Don Beaupre 19 saves / 21 shots

April 11	Washington Capitals	5–4	OT	New York Rangers	Madison Square Garden	Recap
Mike Ridley (1) – 12:32		First period		10:35 – pp – Corey Millen (1); 18:51 – Brian Leetch (1)
Kelly Miller (2) – 01:01; Mike Lalor (1) – 15:26		Second period		18:31 – Mark Janssens (3)
Kevin Hatcher (2) – pp – 12:59		Third period		09:29 – Steven Rice (1)
Dino Ciccarelli (2) – 06:44		First overtime period		No scoring
Don Beaupre 31 saves / 35 shots		Goalie stats		Mike Richter 50 saves / 55 shots

April 13	New York Rangers	2–4	Washington Capitals	Capital Centre	Recap
No scoring		First period	02:46 – Dmitri Khristich (1); 04:09 – Kelly Miller (3); 07:06 – Mike Ridley (2)
Kris King 92) – 08:57; Steven Rice (2) – pp – 18:34		Second period	11:58 – Stephen Leach (1)
No scoring		Third period	No scoring
John Vanbiesbrouck 21 saves / 22 shots Mike Richter 1 save / 4 shots		Goalie stats	Don Beaupre 23 saves / 25 shots

Washington won series 4–2

=== Clarence Campbell Conference ===
==== (N1) Chicago Blackhawks vs. (N4) Minnesota North Stars ====
This was the sixth playoff meeting between these two teams and were meeting for the second straight year. Chicago won four of the previous five playoff meetings, including last year's Norris Division Semifinals in seven games.

April 4	Minnesota North Stars	4–3	OT	Chicago Blackhawks	Chicago Stadium	Recap
Mark Tinordi (1) – pp – 01:24; Neal Broten (1) – pp – 02:08		First period		00:13 – Jeremy Roenick (1); 04:06 – pp – Doug Wilson (1)
No scoring		Second period		09:08 – Dirk Graham (1)
Neal Broten (2) – 06:22		Third period		No scoring
Brian Propp (1) – pp – 04:14		First overtime period		No scoring
Jon Casey 20 saves / 23 shots		Goalie stats		Ed Belfour 30 saves / 34 shots

April 6	Minnesota North Stars	2–5	Chicago Blackhawks	Chicago Stadium	Recap
No scoring		First period	12:58 – Steve Larmer (1)
No scoring		Second period	03:30 – pp – Jeremy Roenick (2); 14:40 – pp – Warren Rychel (1); 16:39 – Steve Konroyd (1)
Basil McRae (1) – 16:03; Brian Bellows (1) – pp – 17:46		Third period	19:11 – Steve Larmer (2)
Jon Casey 21 saves / 25 shots Brian Hayward 10 saves / 10 shots		Goalie stats	Ed Belfour 28 saves / 30 shots

April 8	Chicago Blackhawks	6–5	Minnesota North Stars	Met Center	Recap
Steve Larmer (3) – 05:27; Chris Chelios (1) – pp – 08:35		First period	02:34 – pp – Bobby Smith; 06:10 – pp – Brian Bellows (2); 10:53 – Dave Gagner (1); 17:55 – pp – Dave Gagner (2); 18:26 – Mike Modano (1)
Steve Larmer (4) – pp – 00:39; Doug Wilson (2) – pp – 05:03		Second period	No scoring
Steve Thomas (1) – 03:48; Jeremy Roenick (3) – 06:15		Third period	No scoring
Ed Belfour 37 saves / 41 shots Dominik Hasek 5 saves / 6 shots		Goalie stats	Jon Casey 14 saves / 18 shots Brian Hayward 11 saves / 13 shots

April 10	Chicago Blackhawks	1–3	Minnesota North Stars	Met Center	Recap
No scoring		First period	No scoring
No scoring		Second period	04:48 – Neal Broten (3); 11:30 – pp – Mike Craig (1); 14:52 – pp – Mark Tinordi (2)
Steve Larmer (5) – 15:02		Third period	No scoring
Ed Belfour 18 saves / 21 shots Dominik Hasek 13 saves / 13 shots		Goalie stats	Jon Casey 16 saves / 17 shots

April 12	Minnesota North Stars	6–0	Chicago Blackhawks	Chicago Stadium	Recap
Brian Propp (2) – pp – 17:59		First period	No scoring
Mark Tinordi (3) – pp – 00:32; Dave Gagner (3) – pp – 06:46; Bobby Smith (2) – pp – 07:16; Neal Broten (4) – 14:30		Second period	No scoring
Brian Propp (3) – pp – 16:06		Third period	No scoring
Jon Casey 25 saves / 25 shots		Goalie stats	Ed Belfour 19 saves / 23 shots Dominik Hasek 18 saves / 20 shots

April 14	Chicago Blackhawks	1–3	Minnesota North Stars	Met Center	Recap
No scoring		First period	11:49 – Neil Wilkinson (1); 12:58 – Brian Bellows (3)
No scoring		Second period	No scoring
Keith Brown (1) – 15:51		Third period	06:29 – pp – Brian Bellows (4)
Ed Belfour 31 saves / 34 shots		Goalie stats	Jon Casey 26 saves / 27 shots

Minnesota won series 4–2

==== (N2) St. Louis Blues vs. (N3) Detroit Red Wings ====
This was the third playoff meeting between these two teams. Both teams split the previous two meetings. Detroit won their most recent meeting in five games in the 1988 Norris Division Finals.

April 4	Detroit Red Wings	6–3	St. Louis Blues	St. Louis Arena	Recap
Brad McCrimmon (1) – 13:37		First period	No scoring
Steve Yzerman (1) – 07:08; Steve Yzerman (2) – pp – 12:01		Second period	13:10 – Brett Hull (1)
Sergei Fedorov (1) – 01:52; Kevin Miller (1) – 09:19; Steve Yzerman (3) – 14:55		Third period	10:23 – pp – Brett Hull (2); 12:44 – Adam Oates (1)
Tim Cheveldae 37 saves / 40 shots		Goalie stats	Vincent Riendeau 17 saves / 22 shots Pat Jablonski 4 saves / 5 shots

April 6	Detroit Red Wings	2–4	St. Louis Blues	St. Louis Arena	Recap
Yves Racine (1) – pp – 09:08; Bob Probert (1) – 16:56		First period	No scoring
No scoring		Second period	No scoring
No scoring		Third period	05:28 – Jeff Brown (1); 06:46 – pp – Dan Quinn (1); 12:00 – Brett Hull (3); 19:24 – Rich Sutter (1)
Tim Cheveldae 37 saves / 40 shots		Goalie stats	Vincent Riendeau 19 saves / 21 shots

April 8	St. Louis Blues	2–5	Detroit Red Wings	Joe Louis Arena	Recap
No scoring		First period	No scoring
Bob Bassen (1) – 11:00		Second period	15:19 – Kevin Miller (2)
Gino Cavallini (1) – 18:39		Third period	01:12 – Keith Primeau (1); 08:34 – Jimmy Carson (1); 009:05 – Steve Chiasson (1); 19:42 – sh – Kevin Miller (3)
Vincent Riendeau 19 saves / 23 shots		Goalie stats	Tim Cheveldae 21 saves / 23 shots

April 10	St. Louis Blues	3–4	Detroit Red Wings	Joe Louis Arena	Recap
Dan Quinn (2) – pp – 18:10		First period	04:01 – Steve Chiasson (2)
No scoring		Second period	17:05 – pp – Steve Chiasson (3)
Brett Hull (4) – 05:22; Brett Hull (5) – 17:09		Third period	08:58 – Rick Zombo (1); 11:16 – Brent Fedyk (1)
Vincent Riendeau 30 saves / 34 shots		Goalie stats	Tim Cheveldae 26 saves / 29 shots

April 12	Detroit Red Wings	1–6	St. Louis Blues	St. Louis Arena	Recap
Bobby Dollas (1) – 02:12		First period	03:45 – Adam Oates (2); 04:58 – Brett Hull (6); 09:29 – Adam Oates (3)
No scoring		Second period	00:40 – Paul Cavallini (1); 10:33 – Adam Oates (4)
No scoring		Third period	08:08 – Brett Hull (7)
Tim Cheveldae 25 saves / 30 shots Allan Bester 11 saves / 12 shots		Goalie stats	Vincent Riendeau 17 saves / 18 shots

April 14	St. Louis Blues	3–0	Detroit Red Wings	Joe Louis Arena	Recap
Dave Thomlinson (1) – 07:00		First period	No scoring
Jeff Brown (2) – 02:24		Second period	No scoring
Dave Lowry (1) – 18:19		Third period	No scoring
Vincent Riendeau 23 saves / 23 shots		Goalie stats	Tim Cheveldae 18 saves / 21 shots

April 16	Detroit Red Wings	2–3	St. Louis Blues	St. Louis Arena	Recap
No scoring		First period	12:24 – Dan Quinn (3)
Yves Racine (2) – pp – 03:24		Second period	19:39 – Brett Hull (8)
Jimmy Carson (2) – 12:27		Third period	01:59 – Rich Sutter (2)
Tim Cheveldae 22 saves / 25 shots		Goalie stats	Vincent Riendeau 18 saves / 20 shots

St. Louis won series 4–3

==== (S1) Los Angeles Kings vs. (S4) Vancouver Canucks ====
This was the second playoff meeting between these two teams. Vancouver won the only prior meeting in five games in the 1982 Smythe Division Finals.

April 4	Vancouver Canucks	6–5	Los Angeles Kings	Great Western Forum	Recap
Dave Capuano (1) – 02:20; Igor Larionov (1) – 07:00; Geoff Courtnall (1) – 19:40		First period	08:33 – Tomas Sandstrom (1); 10:42 – Bob Kudelski (1)
No scoring		Second period	06:01 – Wayne Gretzky (1); 06:39 – Steve Kasper (1); 14:59 – Luc Robitaille (1)
Geoff Courtnall (2) – 05:00; Geoff Courtnall (3) – 09:30; Cliff Ronning (1) – 17:29		Third period	No scoring
Troy Gamble 24 saves / 29 shots		Goalie stats	Kelly Hrudey 26 saves / 32 shots

April 6	Vancouver Canucks	2–3	OT	Los Angeles Kings	Great Western Forum	Recap
Tom Kurvers (1) – pp – 10:35		First period		No scoring
Cliff Ronning (2) – 00:31		Second period		02:47 – pp – Rob Blake (1)
No scoring		Third period		03:13 – Luc Robitaille (2)
No scoring		First overtime period		11:08 – Wayne Gretzky (2)
Troy Gamble 37 saves / 40 shots		Goalie stats		Kelly Hrudey 32 saves / 34 shots

April 8	Los Angeles Kings	1–2	OT	Vancouver Canucks	Pacific Coliseum	Recap
No scoring		First period		No scoring
No scoring		Second period		00:41 – pp – Cliff Ronning (3)
Wayne Gretzky (3) – 11:53		Third period		No scoring
No scoring		First overtime period		03:12 – Cliff Ronning (4)
Kelly Hrudey 37 saves / 39 shots		Goalie stats		Kirk McLean 30 saves / 31 shots

April 10	Los Angeles Kings	6–1	Vancouver Canucks	Pacific Coliseum	Recap
Steve Kasper (2) – 08:30; Wayne Gretzky (4) – pp – 13:11		First period	09:14 – pp – Cliff Ronning (5)
Dave Taylor (1) – 10:20		Second period	No scoring
Tony Granato (1) – 01:24; Mike Donnelly (1) – 14:21; Steve Duchesne (1) – 18:44		Third period	No scoring
Kelly Hrudey 20 saves / 21 shots		Goalie stats	Kirk McLean 29 saves / 35 shots

April 12	Vancouver Canucks	4–7	Los Angeles Kings	Great Western Forum	Recap
Jyrki Lumme (1) – sh – 04:50; Cliff Ronning (6) – 13:59		First period	08:52 – pp – Luc Robitaille (3); 16:48 – pp – Luc Robitaille (4); 19:01 – Mike Donnelly (2)
Jyrki Lumme (2) – pp – 01:37; Gerald Diduck (1) – pp – 05:57		Second period	06:25 – Steve Duchesne (2); 13:27 – Bradley Jones (1); 16:14 – pp – Tomas Sandstrom (2)
No scoring		Third period	19:17 – Bob Kudelski (2)
Troy Gamble 32 saves / 38 shots		Goalie stats	Kelly Hrudey 29 saves / 33 shots

April 14	Los Angeles Kings	4–1	Vancouver Canucks	Pacific Coliseum	Recap
Steve Duchesne (3) – 09:35		First period	No scoring
No scoring		Second period	16:13 – Tom Kurvers (2)
Dave Taylor (2) – 12:11; Mike Donnelly (3) – 18:47; Mike Donnelly (4) – 19:06		Third period	No scoring
Kelly Hrudey 20 saves / 21 shots		Goalie stats	Troy Gamble 24 saves / 26 shots

Los Angeles won series 4–2

==== (S2) Calgary Flames vs. (S3) Edmonton Oilers ====
This was the fifth playoff meeting between these two rivals with Edmonton winning three of the four previous series. They last met in the 1988 Smythe Division Finals, which Edmonton won in a four-game sweep. These teams did not meet again in the playoffs until 2022.

Esa Tikkanen's overtime goal in game seven completed a hat trick and won the series for the Oilers.

April 4	Edmonton Oilers	3–1	Calgary Flames	Olympic Saddledome	Recap
Esa Tikkanen (1) – 18:20		First period	12:07 – pp – Al MacInnis (1)
Petr Klima (1) – 10:18		Second period	No scoring
Craig Simpson (1) – 14:35		Third period	No scoring
Grant Fuhr 27 saves / 28 shots		Goalie stats	Mike Vernon 22 saves / 25 shots

April 6	Edmonton Oilers	1–3	Calgary Flames	Olympic Saddledome	Recap
No scoring		First period	12:53 – pp – Gary Suter (1)
Adam Graves (1) – 03:10		Second period	01:53 – Doug Gilmour (1); 03:53 – Paul Ranheim (1)
No scoring		Third period	No scoring
Grant Fuhr 23 saves / 26 shots		Goalie stats	Mike Vernon 35 saves / 36 shots

April 8	Calgary Flames	3–4	Edmonton Oilers	Northlands Coliseum	Recap
Joe Nieuwendyk (1) – pp – 02:03		First period	02:14 – Esa Tikkanen (2)
Joel Otto (1) – 10:49; Gary Roberts (1) – 17:26		Second period	15:51 – Charlie Huddy (1)
No scoring		Third period	09:47 – Glenn Anderson (1); 19:46 – Joe Murphy (1)
Mike Vernon 25 saves / 29 shots		Goalie stats	Grant Fuhr 20 saves / 23 shots

April 10	Calgary Flames	2–5	Edmonton Oilers	Northlands Coliseum	Recap
Joe Nieuwendyk (2) – 00:44; Sergei Makarov (1) – 14:02		First period	No scoring
No scoring		Second period	01:11 – pp – Mark Messier (1); 01:52 – Craig MacTavish (1); 19:00 – pp – Esa Tikkanen (3)
No scoring		Third period	01:47 – pp – Esa Tikkanen (4); 03:38 – Kelly Buchberger (1)
Mike Vernon 23 saves / 27 shots Rick Wamsley 1 save / 2 shots		Goalie stats	Grant Fuhr 29 saves / 31 shots

April 12	Edmonton Oilers	3–5	Calgary Flames	Olympic Saddledome	Recap
Glenn Anderson (2) – pp – 15:54; Adam Graves (2) – 18:13		First period	03:28 – pp – Al MacInnis (2); 07:56 – pp – Carey Wilson (1)
Mark Messier (2) – 14:07		Second period	07:37 – Carey Wilson; 08:48 – Ric Nattress (1)
No scoring		Third period	19:59 – Joe Nieuwendyk (3)
Grant Fuhr 34 saves / 38 shots		Goalie stats	Mike Vernon 22 saves / 25 shots

April 14	Calgary Flames	2–1	OT	Edmonton Oilers	Northlands Coliseum	Recap
No scoring		First period		12:13 – Craig Simpson (2)
Paul Ranheim (2) – 09:12		Second period		No scoring
No scoring		Third period		No scoring
Theoren Fleury (1) – 04:40		First overtime period		No scoring
Mike Vernon 21 saves / 22 shots		Goalie stats		Grant Fuhr 31 saves / 33 shots

April 16	Edmonton Oilers	5–4	OT	Calgary Flames	Olympic Saddledome	Recap
Esa Tikkanen (5) – 17:03		First period		07:52 – pp – Robert Reichel (1); 14:43 – pp – Joe Nieuwendyk (4); 16:00 – Theoren Fleury (2)
Glenn Anderson (3) – pp – 04:57; Esa Tikkanen (6) – 10:06		Second period		No scoring
Anatoli Semenov (1) – 04:38		Third period		17:50 – Ron Stern (1)
Esa Tikkanen (7) – 06:58		First overtime period		No scoring
Grant Fuhr 27 saves / 31 shots		Goalie stats		Mike Vernon 35 saves / 40 shots

Edmonton won series 4–3

== Division finals ==
=== Prince of Wales Conference ===
==== (A1) Boston Bruins vs. (A2) Montreal Canadiens ====
This was the eighth straight and 26th overall playoff meeting between these two teams. Montreal lead the all-time meetings 21–4. Boston won last year's Adams Division Finals in five games.

April 17	Montreal Canadiens	1–2	Boston Bruins	Boston Garden	Recap
Mike Keane (3) – 07:09		First period	No scoring
No scoring		Second period	07:04 – pp – Cam Neely (6)
No scoring		Third period	10:12 – Cam Neely (7)
Patrick Roy 23 saves / 25 shots		Goalie stats	Andy Moog 18 saves / 19 shots

April 19	Montreal Canadiens	4–3	OT	Boston Bruins	Boston Garden	Recap
No scoring		First period		04:35 – Ray Bourque (3); 11:10 – Ken Hodge Jr. (2)
Shayne Corson (5) – 19:31		Second period		No scoring
Russ Courtnall (6) – 04:24; Stephane Richer (6) – 11:30		Third period		07:54 – Dave Christian (5)
Stephane Richer (7) – 00:27		First overtime period		No scoring
Patrick Roy 41 saves / 44 shots		Goalie stats		Andy Moog 33 saves / 37 shots

April 21	Boston Bruins	3–2	Montreal Canadiens	Montreal Forum	Recap
Petri Skriko (4) – pp – 04:38; Bob Sweeney (3) – 05:11		First period	16:31 – sh – Russ Courtnall (7)
No scoring		Second period	No scoring
Ken Hodge Jr. (3) – 18:39		Third period	14:10 – Brian Skrudland (2)
Andy Moog 39 saves / 41 shots		Goalie stats	Patrick Roy 23 saves / 26 shots

April 23	Boston Bruins	2–6	Montreal Canadiens	Montreal Forum	Recap
Ray Bourque (4) – 15:49		First period	05:05 – pp – Shayne Corson (6)
Cam Neely (8) – pp – 19:59		Second period	00:49 – Stephane Richer (8); 08:12 – pp – Shayne Corson (7); 09:28 – Mathieu Schneider (2)
No scoring		Third period	04:09 – Stephane Richer (9); 17:12 – sh – Russ Courtnall (8)
Andy Moog 22 saves / 27 shots		Goalie stats	Patrick Roy 23 saves / 25 shots

April 25	Montreal Canadiens	1–4	Boston Bruins	Boston Garden	Recap
Brian Skrudland (3) – pp – 19:54		First period	19:06 – Cam Neely (9)
No scoring		Second period	19:02 – pp – Vladimir Ruzicka (1)
No scoring		Third period	07:58 – pp – Cam Neely (10); 08:09 – Cam Neely (11)
Patrick Roy 28 saves / 32 shots		Goalie stats	Andy Moog 18 saves / 19 shots

April 27	Boston Bruins	2–3	OT	Montreal Canadiens	Montreal Forum	Recap
Don Sweeney (1) – 08:06		First period		04:44 – pp – Stephan Lebeau (1)
No scoring		Second period		No scoring
Jeff Lazaro (3) – 01:26		Third period		15:56 – Shayne Corson (8)
No scoring		First overtime period		17:47 – Shayne Corson (9)
Andy Moog 38 saves / 41 shots		Goalie stats		Patrick Roy 32 saves / 34 shots

April 29	Montreal Canadiens	1–2	Boston Bruins	Boston Garden	Recap
No scoring		First period	No scoring
No scoring		Second period	06:30 – Dave Christian (6)
Stephan Lebeau (2) – 19:00		Third period	01:59 – pp – Cam Neely (12)
Patrick Roy 31 saves / 33 shots		Goalie stats	Andy Moog 35 saves / 36 shots

Boston won series 4–3

==== (P1) Pittsburgh Penguins vs. (P3) Washington Capitals ====
This was the first playoff meeting between these two teams.

April 17	Washington Capitals	4–2	Pittsburgh Penguins	Civic Arena	Recap
No scoring		First period	17:45 – pp – Larry Murphy (2)
Calle Johansson (1) – pp – 06:07		Second period	13:09 – pp – Mario Lemieux (4)
Kevin Hatcher (3) – pp – 01:37; Al Iafrate (1) – 15:31; Kelly Miller (4) – 19:10		Third period	No scoring
Don Beaupre 24 saves / 26 shots		Goalie stats	Frank Pietrangelo 27 saves / 30 shots

April 19	Washington Capitals	6–7	OT	Pittsburgh Penguins	Civic Arena	Recap
Dale Hunter (1) – 12:42		First period		13:59 – Phil Bourque (2); 18:11 – Joe Mullen (2)
John Druce (1) – pp – 03:46; Mike Ridley (3) – pp – 11:36		Second period		00:35 – pp – Mark Recchi (3); 05:51 – pp – Mark Recchi (4); 13:35 – Kevin Stevens (4)
Dino Ciccarelli (3) – pp – 02:17; Dino Ciccarelli (4) – 08:05; Calle Johansson (2) – 10:26		Third period		15:25 – Randy Gilhen (1)
No scoring		First overtime period		08:10 – Kevin Stevens (5)
Don Beaupre 19 saves / 24 shots Mike Liut 17 saves / 19 shots		Goalie stats		Frank Pietrangelo 36 saves / 42 shots

April 21	Pittsburgh Penguins	3–1	Washington Capitals	Capital Centre	Recap
Mario Lemieux (5) – 04:53		First period	08:25 – pp – Dino Ciccarelli (5)
Kevin Stevens (6) – 09:30; Bryan Trottier (1) – 15:32		Second period	No scoring
No scoring		Third period	No scoring
Tom Barrasso 26 saves / 27 shots		Goalie stats	Don Beaupre 19 saves / 22 shots

April 23	Pittsburgh Penguins	3–1	Washington Capitals	Capital Centre	Recap
Mark Recchi (5) – pp – 18:01		First period	09:43 – Tim Bergland (1)
No scoring		Second period	No scoring
Kevin Stevens (7) – 09:14; Phil Bourque (3) – 19:28		Third period	No scoring
Tom Barrasso 38 saves / 39 shots		Goalie stats	Don Beaupre 16 saves / 18 shots

April 25	Washington Capitals	1–4	Pittsburgh Penguins	Civic Arena	Recap
No scoring		First period	15:38 – Joe Mullen (3)
Dave Tippett (2) – 09:13		Second period	04:11 – Ron Francis (3)
No scoring		Third period	07:53 – Jaromir Jagr (3); 18:43 – Mark Recchi (6)
Don Beaupre 27 saves / 30 shots		Goalie stats	Tom Barrasso 33 saves / 34 shots

Pittsburgh won series 4–1

=== Clarence Campbell Conference ===
==== (N2) St. Louis Blues vs. (N4) Minnesota North Stars ====
This was the ninth playoff series between these two teams, and the last one before the North Stars relocated to Dallas. St. Louis won five of the previous eight playoff series, including the most recent one in five games in the 1989 Norris Division Semifinals.

April 18	Minnesota North Stars	2–1	St. Louis Blues	St. Louis Arena	Recap
Dave Gagner (4) – pp – 01:46; Shane Churla (1) – 19:49		First period	No scoring
No scoring		Second period	No scoring
No scoring		Third period	04:35 – Rich Sutter (3)
Jon Casey 31 saves / 32 shots		Goalie stats	Vincent Riendeau 25 saves / 27 shots

April 20	Minnesota North Stars	2–5	St. Louis Blues	St. Louis Arena	Recap
Stew Gavin (1) – 00:26; Brian Bellows (5) – 10:06		First period	01:06 – Garth Butcher (1)
No scoring		Second period	06:35 – pp – Rod Brind'Amour (1)
No scoring		Third period	07:55 – Adam Oates (5); 13:41 – Jeff Brown (3); 19:41 – Rich Sutter (4)
Jon Casey 23 saves / 27 shots		Goalie stats	Vincent Riendeau 20 saves / 22 shots

April 22	St. Louis Blues	1–5	Minnesota North Stars	Met Center	Recap
No scoring		First period	03:34 – Curt Giles (1); 05:29 – Stew Gavin (2); 07:52 – pp – Brian Bellows; 10:48 – pp – Neil Wilkinson (2)
Dave Thomlinson (2) – 13:58		Second period	07:36 – pp – Brian Propp (4)
No scoring		Third period	No scoring
Pat Jablonski 17 saves / 18 shots Vincent Riendeau 4 saves / 8 shots		Goalie stats	Jon Casey 29 saves / 30 shots

April 24	St. Louis Blues	4–8	Minnesota North Stars	Met Center	Recap
Adam Oates (6) – pp – 14:06		First period	01:12 – Brian Bellows (7); 03:02 – Mike Modano (2); 08:53 – Mike Modano (3)
Brett Hull (9) – pp – 09:08		Second period	06:26 – pp – Brian Glynn (1); 10:13 – pp – Brian Propp (5); 10:38 – Dave Gagner (5); 14:53 – pp – Brian Bellows (8); 17:46 – pp – Brian Glynn (2)
Adam Oates (7) – pp – 00:13; Brett Hull (10) – pp – 02:16		Third period	No scoring
Vincent Riendeau 14 saves / 19 shots Pat Jablonski 9 saves / 12 shots		Goalie stats	Jon Casey 32 saves / 36 shots

April 26	Minnesota North Stars	2–4	St. Louis Blues	St. Louis Arena	Recap
No scoring		First period	01:46 – Rod Brind'Amour (2)
No scoring		Second period	10:43 – pp – Paul Cavallini (2); 18:04 – Dan Quinn (4)
Brian Propp (6) – pp – 14:04; Mike Modano (4) – pp – 17:39		Third period	09:03 – pp – Dave Thomlinson (3)
Jon Casey 25 saves / 29 shots Brian Hayward 2 saves / 2 shots		Goalie stats	Vincent Riendeau 24 saves / 26 shots

April 28	St. Louis Blues	2–3	Minnesota North Stars	Met Center	Recap
No scoring		First period	No scoring
No scoring		Second period	No scoring
Brett Hull (11) – 17:18; Garth Butcher (2) – 19:43		Third period	00:19 – Chris Dahlquist (1); 03:50 – Bobby Smith (3); 18:56 – Bobby Smith (4)
Vincent Riendeau 29 saves / 31 shots		Goalie stats	Jon Casey 18 saves / 20 shots

Minnesota won series 4–2

==== (S1) Los Angeles Kings vs. (S3) Edmonton Oilers ====
This was the third straight and sixth overall playoff meeting between these two teams. Edmonton won three of the previous five meetings, including last year's Smythe Division Finals in a four-game sweep.

April 18	Edmonton Oilers	3–4	OT	Los Angeles Kings	Great Western Forum	Recap
No scoring		First period		05:17 – Steve Kasper (3)
Martin Gelinas (1) – 11:30		Second period		07:08 – pp – Tomas Sandstrom (3)
Mark Messier (3) – 00:20; Petr Klima (2) – 05:34		Third period		12:07 – pp – Luc Robitaille (5)
No scoring		First overtime period		02:13 – Luc Robitaille (6)
Bill Ranford 34 saves / 38 shots		Goalie stats		Kelly Hrudey 29 saves / 32 shots

April 20	Edmonton Oilers	4–3	2OT	Los Angeles Kings	Great Western Forum	Recap
Kevin Lowe (1) – 08:29; Martin Gelinas (2) – 17:54		First period		00:13 – Todd Elik (1); 19:40 – Bob Kudelski (3)
Anatoli Semenov (2) – 11:18		Second period		No scoring
No scoring		Third period		06:32 – Luc Robitaille (7)
Petr Klima (3) – 04:48		Second overtime period		No scoring
Grant Fuhr 46 saves / 49 shots		Goalie stats		Kelly Hrudey 34 saves / 38 shots

April 22	Los Angeles Kings	3–4	2OT	Edmonton Oilers	Northlands Coliseum	Recap
No scoring		First period		No scoring
Luc Robitaille (8) – pp – 18:08		Second period		04:48 – Jeff Beukeboom (1)
John Tonelli (1) – pp – 05:38; John Tonelli (2) – 11:52		Third period		11:16 – pp – Esa Tikkanen (8); 14:55 – Anatoli Semenov (3)
No scoring		Second overtime period		00:48 – Esa Tikkanen (9)
Kelly Hrudey 35 saves / 39 shots		Goalie stats		Grant Fuhr 27 saves / 30 shots

April 24	Los Angeles Kings	2–4	Edmonton Oilers	Northlands Coliseum	Recap
Larry Robinson (1) – 16:34		First period	12:07 – Charlie Huddy (2); 18:40 – pp – Joe Murphy (2); 19:23 – Martin Gelinas (3)
Steve Duchesne (4) – pp – 19:30		Second period	No scoring
No scoring		Third period	01:49 – Petr Klima (4)
Kelly Hrudey 26 saves / 30 shots		Goalie stats	Grant Fuhr 26 saves / 28 shots

April 26	Edmonton Oilers	2–5	Los Angeles Kings	Great Western Forum	Recap
Anatoli Semenov (4) – 10:01		First period	12:48 – sh – Steve Kasper (4); 15:08 – Luc Robitaille (9); 19:03 – pp – Luc Robitaille (10)
No scoring		Second period	13:42 – Luc Robitaille (11)
Glenn Anderson (4) – pp – 05:04		Third period	15:04 – Todd Elik (2)
Grant Fuhr 17 saves / 22 shots		Goalie stats	Kelly Hrudey 23 saves / 25 shots

April 28	Los Angeles Kings	3–4	OT	Edmonton Oilers	Northlands Coliseum	Recap
No scoring		First period		07:49 – Craig Simpson (3)
Tomas Sandstrom (4) – pp – 11:21; Luc Robitaille (12) – 14:34		Second period		02:03 – Esa Tikkanen (10)
Mike Donnelly (5) – 04:27		Third period		12:38 – Esa Tikkanen (11)
No scoring		First overtime period		16:57 – Craig MacTavish (2)
Kelly Hrudey 34 saves / 38 shots		Goalie stats		Grant Fuhr 26 saves / 29 shots Bill Ranford 12 saves / 12 shots

Edmonton won series 4–2

== Conference finals ==
=== Prince of Wales Conference final ===
==== (A1) Boston Bruins vs. (P1) Pittsburgh Penguins ====
This was the third playoff series between these two teams. Boston won both previous series in consecutive years, with Boston winning the most recent series 3–2 in the 1980 Preliminary Round. Boston made their second consecutive and fourth overall Conference Finals appearance; they defeated the Washington Capitals the previous year in a four-game sweep. This was the first conference final for Pittsburgh since the playoffs went to a conference format starting in 1982. Pittsburgh last played a semifinal series in 1970 where they lost to the St. Louis Blues in six games. These teams split their three-game regular season series.

May 1	Pittsburgh Penguins	3–6	Boston Bruins	Boston Garden	Recap
Joe Mullen (4) – 01:25; Kevin Stevens (8) – pp – 08:28		First period	05:31 – pp – Craig Janney (2); 16:02 – Cam Neely (13)
No scoring		Second period	03:23 – Bob Sweeney (4); 15:35 – Cam Neely (14)
Bob Errey (2) – 06:08		Third period	12:17 – Dave Christian (7); 16:02 – pp – Ray Bourque (5)
Tom Barrasso 17 saves / 23 shots		Goalie stats	Andy Moog 31 saves / 34 shots

May 3	Pittsburgh Penguins	4–5	OT	Boston Bruins	Boston Garden	Recap
Kevin Stevens (9) – 05:36; Mario Lemieux (6) – 16:34		First period		05:23 – pp – Cam Neely (15); 11:53 – pp – Glen Wesley (2)
No scoring		Second period		00:38 – Ray Bourque (6)
Mark Recchi (7) – pp – 11:01; Mario Lemieux (7) – 13:00		Third period		16:49 – pp – Craig Janney (3)
No scoring		First overtime period		08:14 – Vladimir Ruzicka (2)
Tom Barrasso 25 saves / 30 shots		Goalie stats		Andy Moog 30 saves / 34 shots

May 5	Boston Bruins	1–4	Pittsburgh Penguins	Civic Arena	Recap
No scoring		First period	13:31 – Kevin Stevens (10)
Ray Bourque (7) – 10:24		Second period	05:01 – Ron Francis (4); 10:40 – Grant Jennings (1); 13:11 – Mario Lemieux (8)
No scoring		Third period	No scoring
Andy Moog 17 saves / 21 shots Rejean Lemelin 12 saves / 12 shots		Goalie stats	Tom Barrasso 27 saves / 28 shots

May 7	Boston Bruins	1–4	Pittsburgh Penguins	Civic Arena	Recap
No scoring		First period	08:49 – Bob Errey (3)
No scoring		Second period	12:08 – Joe Mullen (5)
Dave Christian (8) – 08:38		Third period	10:23 – Mario Lemieux (9); 17:22 – pp – Kevin Stevens (11)
Andy Moog 34 saves / 38 shots		Goalie stats	Tom Barrasso 29 saves / 30 shots

May 9	Pittsburgh Penguins	7–2	Boston Bruins	Boston Garden	Recap
Kevin Stevens (12) – 07:55; Mario Lemieux (10) – pp – 12:04; Bryan Trottier (2) – 15:49		First period	00:40 – Don Sweeney (2); 19:27 – pp – Craig Janney (4)
Kevin Stevens (13) – pp – 13:04; Paul Stanton (1) – 17:02		Second period	No scoring
Larry Murphy (3) – pp – 01:08; Ulf Samuelsson (1) – 05:36		Third period	No scoring
Tom Barrasso 34 saves / 36 shots		Goalie stats	Andy Moog 20 saves / 27 shots Rejean Lemelin 6 saves / 6 shots

May 11	Boston Bruins	3–5	Pittsburgh Penguins	Civic Arena	Recap
No scoring		First period	No scoring
Cam Neely (16) – pp – 07:16; Ken Hodge Jr. (4) pp – 09:33		Second period	11:45 – pp – Larry Murphy (4); 17:17 – Phil Bourque (4)
Don Sweeney (3) – 12:13		Third period	10:08 – Gordie Roberts (1); 15:40 – Mark Recchi (8); 19:32 – Mario Lemieux (11)
Andy Moog 23 saves / 27 shots		Goalie stats	Tom Barrasso 25 saves / 28 shots

Pittsburgh won series 4–2

=== Clarence Campbell Conference final ===
==== (S3) Edmonton Oilers vs. (N4) Minnesota North Stars ====
This was the second playoff series meeting between these two teams. Edmonton won the only previous meeting 4–0 in the 1984 Campbell Conference Finals. Edmonton made their second consecutive and seventh appearance in the Conference Finals; they defeated the Chicago Blackhawks the previous year in six games. Minnesota made their second Conference Finals appearance; they last made it to the Conference Finals in 1984, when they were swept by the Oilers in four straight. Minnesota won this year's three-game regular season series earning five of six points. Minnesota's series victory was the first time since realignment in 1981 that the Clarence Campbell Conference was not represented by a Canadian or Smythe Division team in the Stanley Cup Final, and the first time since 1982 it was not represented by an Albertan team.

May 2	Minnesota North Stars	3–1	Edmonton Oilers	Northlands Coliseum	Recap
Neal Broten (5) – 15:11		First period	02:15 – pp – Steve Smith (1)
Dave Gagner (6) – pp – 08:05		Second period	No scoring
Gaetan Duchesne (1) – 16:21		Third period	No scoring
Jon Casey 27 saves / 28 shots		Goalie stats	Grant Fuhr 29 saves / 32 shots

May 4	Minnesota North Stars	2–7	Edmonton Oilers	Northlands Coliseum	Recap
Dave Gagner (7) – pp – 01:55		First period	06:14 – Petr Klima (5); 08:23 – pp – Petr Klima (6); 11:27 – Petr Klima (7); 19:27 – pp – Charlie Huddy (3)
Stew Gavin (3) – sh – 10:19		Second period	16:02 – Glenn Anderson (5); 17:12 – Anatoli Semenov (5)
No scoring		Third period	03:06 – Glenn Anderson (6)
Brian Hayward 18 saves / 21 shots Jon Casey 7 saves / 11 shots		Goalie stats	Grant Fuhr 19 saves / 21 shots

May 6	Edmonton Oilers	3–7	Minnesota North Stars	Met Center	Recap
Kelly Buchberger (2) – 11:09		First period	04:00 – Mike Modano (5); 09:52 – pp – Brian Propp (7); 18:36 – Mark Tinordi (4)
Craig Simpson (4) – pp – 05:15; Craig Simpson (5) – 13:37		Second period	10:41 – Bobby Smith (5); 17:25 – pp – Brian Bellows (9)
No scoring		Third period	03:23 – Brian Bellows (10); 18:45 – Shane Churla (2)
Bill Ranford 24 saves / 28 shots Grant Fuhr 5 saves / 8 shots		Goalie stats	Jon Casey 26 saves / 29 shots

May 8	Edmonton Oilers	1–5	Minnesota North Stars	Met Center	Recap
Craig MacTavish (3) – 08:40		First period	13:07 – Marc Bureau (1); 13:25 – Mike Modano (6)
No scoring		Second period	01:03 – pp – Dave Gagner (8); 04:57 – Neil Wilkinson (3); 19:33 – pp – Neal Broten (6)
No scoring		Third period	No scoring
Grant Fuhr 21 saves / 26 shots		Goalie stats	Jon Casey 20 saves / 21 shots

May 10	Minnesota North Stars	3–2	Edmonton Oilers	Northlands Coliseum	Recap
Mark Tinordi (5) – pp – 02:06; Marc Bureau (2) – 12:23		First period	No scoring
No scoring		Second period	10:33 – Esa Tikkanen (12)
Bobby Smith (6) – 04:59		Third period	04:18 – Mark Messier (4)
Jon Casey 19 saves / 21 shots		Goalie stats	Grant Fuhr 30 saves / 33 shots

Minnesota won series 4–1

== Stanley Cup Final ==
This was the first playoff series between these two teams.

May 15	Minnesota North Stars	5–4	Pittsburgh Penguins	Civic Arena	Recap
Neal Broten (7) – 06:32; Ulf Dahlen (1) – 09:49		First period	03:45 – Ulf Samuelsson (2)
Marc Bureau (3) – sh – 06:53; Neal Broten (8) – 17:01		Second period	03:54 – sh – Mario Lemieux (12); 07:43 – pp – Scott Young (1)
Bobby Smith (7) – 01:39		Third period	10:35 – Joe Mullen (6)
Jon Casey 34 saves / 38 shots		Goalie stats	Tom Barrasso 24 saves / 29 shots

May 17	Minnesota North Stars	1–4	Pittsburgh Penguins	Civic Arena	Recap
No scoring		First period	14:26 – sh – Bob Errey (4); 19:10 – pp – Kevin Stevens (14)
Mike Modano (7) – pp – 00:55		Second period	15:04 – Mario Lemieux (13); 16:32 – Kevin Stevens (15)
No scoring		Third period	No scoring
Jon Casey 27 saves / 31 shots		Goalie stats	Tom Barrasso 39 saves / 40 shots

May 19	Pittsburgh Penguins	1–3	Minnesota North Stars	Met Center	Recap
No scoring		First period	No scoring
No scoring		Second period	07:21 – Dave Gagner (9); 07:54 – Bobby Smith (8)
Phil Bourque (5) – 01:23		Third period	02:09 – Gaetan Duchesne (2)
Tom Barrasso 30 saves / 33 shots		Goalie stats	Jon Casey 29 saves / 30 shots

May 21	Pittsburgh Penguins	5–3	Minnesota North Stars	Met Center	Recap
Kevin Stevens (16) – 00:58; Ron Francis (5) – 02:36; Mario Lemieux (14) – 02:58		First period	18:22 – Dave Gagner (10)
Bryan Trottier (3) – 09:55		Second period	13:10 – pp – Brian Propp (8); 18:25 – pp – Mike Modano (8)
Phil Bourque (6) – 19:45		Third period	No scoring
Tom Barrasso 35 saves / 38 shots		Goalie stats	Jon Casey 19 saves / 23 shots

May 23	Minnesota North Stars	4–6	Pittsburgh Penguins	Civic Arena	Recap
Neal Broten (9) – sh – 14:52		First period	05:36 – pp – Mario Lemieux (15); 10:08 – pp – Kevin Stevens (17); 11:45 – Mark Recchi (9); 13:41 – Mark Recchi (10)
Dave Gagner (11) – sh – 06:54		Second period	16:26 – Ron Francis (6)
Ulf Dahlen (2) – 01:36; Dave Gagner (12) – 07:42		Third period	18:21 – Troy Loney (2)
Jon Casey 9 saves / 13 shots Brian Hayward 16 saves / 18 shots		Goalie stats	Tom Barrasso 6 saves / 7 shots Frank Pietrangelo 15 saves / 18 shots

May 25	Pittsburgh Penguins	8–0	Minnesota North Stars	Met Center	Recap
02:00 – pp – Ulf Samuelsson (3); 12:19 – sh – Mario Lemieux (16); 13:14 – pp – Joe Mullen (7)		First period	No scoring
13:15 – Bob Errey (5); 14:28 – Ron Francis (7); 18:44 – Joe Mullen		Second period	No scoring
01:29 – Jim Paek (1); 13:45 – pp – Larry Murphy (5)		Third period	No scoring
Tom Barrasso 39 saves / 39 shots		Goalie stats	Jon Casey 13 saves / 17 shots Brian Hayward 7 saves / 11 shots

Pittsburgh won series 4–2

== Playoff statistics ==
=== Skaters ===
These are the top ten skaters based on points.

Player	Team	GP	G	A	Pts	+/–	PIM
Mario Lemieux	Pittsburgh Penguins	23	16	28	44	+14	16
Mark Recchi	Pittsburgh Penguins	24	10	24	34	+6	33
Kevin Stevens	Pittsburgh Penguins	24	17	16	33	+14	53
Brian Bellows	Minnesota North Stars	23	10	19	29	-6	30
Dave Gagner	Minnesota North Stars	23	12	15	27	-4	28
Ray Bourque	Boston Bruins	19	7	18	25	-4	12
Brian Propp	Minnesota North Stars	23	8	15	23	-4	28
Larry Murphy	Pittsburgh Penguins	23	5	18	23	+17	44
Neal Broten	Minnesota North Stars	23	9	13	22	+2	6
Craig Janney	Boston Bruins	18	4	18	22	-4	11

=== Goaltenders ===
This is a combined table of the top five goaltenders based on goals against average and the top five goaltenders based on save percentage, with at least 420 minutes played. The table is sorted by GAA, and the criteria for inclusion are bolded.

Player	Team	GP	W	L	SA	GA	GAA	SV%	SO	TOI
Tom Barrasso	Pittsburgh Penguins	20	12	7	629	51	**2.60**	**.919**	1	1175:23
Kelly Hrudey	Los Angeles Kings	12	6	6	382	37	**2.78**	**.903**	0	798:13
Don Beaupre	Washington Capitals	11	5	5	294	29	**2.79**	**.901**	1	624:19
Chris Terreri	New Jersey Devils	7	3	4	216	21	**2.94**	**.903**	0	428:06
Mike Vernon	Calgary Flames	7	3	4	204	21	**2.95**	.897	0	427:28

== See also ==
- 1990–91 NHL season
- List of NHL seasons

Preceded by 1990 Stanley Cup playoffs	Stanley Cup Champions	Succeeded by 1992 Stanley Cup playoffs
