= Scott Robinson =

Scott Robinson may refer to:

- Scott Robinson (jazz musician) (born 1959), American jazz musician
- Scott Robinson (ice hockey) (born 1964), Canadian National Hockey League player
- Scott Robinson (singer) (born 1979), English singer in the boy band 5ive
- Scott Robinson (footballer) (born 1992), Scottish footballer
- Scott Robinson (Neighbours), character in the Australian soap opera Neighbours
