= Dave Thomlinson =

Canadian ice hockey player

- Born: October 22, 1966 (age 59) Edmonton, Alberta, Canada
- Height: 6 ft 1 in (185 cm)
- Weight: 215 lb (98 kg; 15 st 5 lb)
- Position: Left wing
- Shot: Left
- Played for: St. Louis Blues; Boston Bruins; Los Angeles Kings
- NHL draft: 43rd overall, 1985; Toronto Maple Leafs
- Playing career: 1987–1998

David N. Thomlinson (born October 22, 1966) is a Canadian former professional ice hockey left winger who played in the National Hockey League for the St. Louis Blues, Boston Bruins and the Los Angeles Kings between 1989 and 1995. The rest of his career was mainly spent in the minor International Hockey League.

== Playing career ==
Thomlinson was selected 43rd overall by the Toronto Maple Leafs in the 1985 NHL entry draft, and went on to play a total of 42 regular season games, scoring one goal and three assists for four points, collecting 50 penalty minutes in the NHL. He played in 9 playoff games for the St. Louis Blues during the 1991 NHL playoffs, scoring 3 goals and 1 assist for four points, and collected 4 penalty minutes.

== Personal life ==
Thomlinson was born in Edmonton, Alberta. He played junior hockey for the Brandon Wheat Kings.

Thomlinson is now a lawyer with the law firm of Miller Thomson LLP. He is often confused with another former professional hockey player with a very similar name - Dave Tomlinson, who later worked as a radio personality in Vancouver.

== Career statistics ==
=== Regular season and playoffs ===
			Regular season					Playoffs
Season	Team	League	GP	G	A	Pts	PIM	GP	G	A	Pts	PIM
1982–83	Red Deer Rustlers	AJHL	—	—	—	—	—	—	—	—	—	—
1983–84	Brandon Wheat Kings	WHL	41	17	12	29	62	12	3	2	5	24
1984–85	Brandon Wheat Kings	WHL	26	13	14	27	70	—	—	—	—	—
1985–86	Brandon Wheat Kings	WHL	53	25	20	45	116	—	—	—	—	—
1986–87	Brandon Wheat Kings	WHL	2	0	1	1	9	—	—	—	—	—
1986–87	Moose Jaw Warriors	WHL	70	44	36	80	117	9	7	3	10	19
1987–88	Peoria Rivermen	IHL	74	27	30	57	56	7	4	3	7	11
1988–89	Peoria Rivermen	IHL	64	27	29	56	154	3	0	1	1	8
1989–90	St. Louis Blues	NHL	19	1	2	3	12	—	—	—	—	—
1989–90	Peoria Rivermen	IHL	59	27	40	67	87	5	1	1	2	15
1990–91	St. Louis Blues	NHL	3	0	0	0	0	9	3	1	4	4
1990–91	Peoria Rivermen	IHL	80	53	54	107	107	11	6	7	13	28
1991–92	Boston Bruins	NHL	12	0	1	1	17	—	—	—	—	—
1991–92	Maine Mariners	AHL	25	9	11	20	36	—	—	—	—	—
1992–93	Binghamton Rangers	AHL	54	25	35	60	61	12	2	5	7	8
1993–94	Los Angeles Kings	NHL	7	0	0	0	21	—	—	—	—	—
1993–94	Phoenix Roadrunners	IHL	39	10	15	25	70	—	—	—	—	—
1994–95	Los Angeles Kings	NHL	1	0	0	0	0	—	—	—	—	—
1994–95	Phoenix Roadrunners	IHL	77	30	40	70	87	9	5	3	8	8
1995–96	Phoenix Roadrunners	IHL	48	10	13	23	65	4	1	0	1	2
1996–97	Phoenix Roadrunners	IHL	67	16	24	40	40	—	—	—	—	—
1997–98	Manitoba Moose	IHL	28	1	4	5	22	—	—	—	—	—
NHL totals			42	1	3	4	50	9	3	1	4	4
IHL totals			536	201	249	450	688	39	17	15	32	72
