= Shane Churla =

Canadian ice hockey player

- Born: June 24, 1965 (age 61) Fernie, British Columbia, Canada
- Height: 6 ft 1 in (185 cm)
- Weight: 200 lb (91 kg; 14 st 4 lb)
- Position: Right Wing
- Shot: Right
- Played for: Hartford Whalers; Calgary Flames; Minnesota North Stars; Dallas Stars; Los Angeles Kings; New York Rangers
- NHL draft: 110th overall, 1985; Hartford Whalers
- Playing career: 1985–1997

Shane Churla (born June 24, 1965) is a Canadian former professional ice hockey player. He was drafted in the sixth round, 110th overall, by the Hartford Whalers in the 1985 NHL entry draft. He is currently the director of amateur scouting for the Florida Panthers.

== Playing career ==
After playing two seasons in the Western Hockey League with the Medicine Hat Tigers, Churla made his professional debut with the AHL's Binghamton Whalers in the 1985–86 season. He made his NHL debut with Hartford in the 1986–87 season, appearing in 20 games. After dressing for two more games with Hartford in the 1987–88 season, he was traded to the Calgary Flames in a multi-player deal.

During the 1988–89 season, the Flames traded Churla to the Minnesota North Stars. He was one of the players selected from the North Stars by the San Jose Sharks in the 1991 NHL Dispersal Draft; however, he was traded back to the North Stars only days later for Kelly Kisio.

Churla remained with the Stars franchise as it moved south to become the Dallas Stars. In the 1995–96 season, Churla moved from Dallas to the Los Angeles Kings, and then again to the New York Rangers. He retired as a Ranger after the 1996–97 season.

In his NHL career, Churla appeared in 488 games. He scored 26 goals and added 45 assists. He also appeared in 78 Stanley Cup playoff games, scoring five goals and tallying seven assists. Churla was considered a top enforcer in the NHL. He and Basil McRae were a formidable duo on the Minnesota North Stars at the end of the 1980s. He tallied 2,301 penalty minutes in his NHL career.

Churla is perhaps best remembered for receiving one of the most vicious elbows in NHL history during the 1994 Stanley Cup playoffs, courtesy of Pavel Bure. The elbow was dubbed by Don Cherry as "the mother of all elbows." He was once described by Hartford Whalers General Manager Emile Francis as "having the guts of a slaughter house".

== Post-retirement ==
After retirement, Churla continued working in the hockey industry. In 2005, he became a scout for the Dallas Stars, identifying and evaluating draft-eligible players. In 2013, he moved to the Montreal Canadiens in a similar capacity and eventually became the director of amateur scouting. After 7 years in Montreal, Churla left to join the Florida Panthers as their director of amateur scouting.

When the Florida Panthers won the Stanley Cup in 2025, Churla's name was engraved on the Stanley Cup for his role as the team's director of amateur scouting.

== Personal life ==
Churla is the cousin of former National Football League quarterback Mark Rypien.

Churla's younger brother, Russ, also played in the WHL for one season, but has since retired.

== Career statistics ==
			Regular season					Playoffs
Season	Team	League	GP	G	A	Pts	PIM	GP	G	A	Pts	PIM
1983–84	Medicine Hat Tigers	WHL	48	3	7	10	115	14	1	5	6	41
1984–85	Medicine Hat Tigers	WHL	70	14	20	34	370	9	1	0	1	55
1985–86	Binghamton Whalers	AHL	52	4	10	14	306	3	0	0	0	22
1986–87	Hartford Whalers	NHL	20	0	1	1	78	2	0	0	0	42
1986–87	Binghamton Whalers	AHL	24	1	5	6	249	—	—	—	—	—
1987–88	Hartford Whalers	NHL	2	0	0	0	14	—	—	—	—	—
1987–88	Binghamton Whalers	AHL	25	5	8	13	168	—	—	—	—	—
1987–88	Calgary Flames	NHL	29	1	5	6	132	7	0	1	1	17
1988–89	Calgary Flames	NHL	5	0	0	0	25	—	—	—	—	—
1988–89	Salt Lake Golden Eagles	IHL	32	3	13	16	278	—	—	—	—	—
1988–89	Minnesota North Stars	NHL	13	1	0	1	54	—	—	—	—	—
1989–90	Minnesota North Stars	NHL	52	2	3	5	292	7	0	0	0	44
1990–91	Minnesota North Stars	NHL	40	2	2	4	286	22	2	1	3	90
1991–92	Minnesota North Stars	NHL	57	4	1	5	278	—	—	—	—	—
1992–93	Minnesota North Stars	NHL	73	5	16	21	286	—	—	—	—	—
1993–94	Dallas Stars	NHL	69	6	7	13	333	9	1	3	4	35
1994–95	Dallas Stars	NHL	27	1	3	4	186	5	0	0	0	20
1995–96	Dallas Stars	NHL	34	3	4	7	168	—	—	—	—	—
1995–96	Los Angeles Kings	NHL	11	1	2	3	37	—	—	—	—	—
1995–96	New York Rangers	NHL	10	0	0	0	26	11	2	2	4	14
1996–97	New York Rangers	NHL	45	0	1	1	106	15	0	0	0	20
NHL totals			488	26	45	71	2,301	78	5	7	12	282

== See also ==
- List of NHL players with 2000 career penalty minutes
