= 1982 Air Canada Cup =

Tournament details
- Venue: Memorial Arena in Victoria, BC
- Dates: April 13 – 18, 1982
- Teams: 12

Final positions
- Champions: Burnaby Winter Club
- Runners-up: Gouverneurs de Ste-Foy
- Third place: Cape Breton Colonels; South Ottawa Warriors

Tournament statistics
- Scoring leader: Cliff Ronning

Awards
- MVP: Cliff Ronning

The 1982 Air Canada Cup was Canada's fourth annual national midget 'AAA' hockey championship, which was played April 13 – 18, 1982 at the Memorial Arena in Victoria, British Columbia. The Burnaby Winter Club Travellers defeated the Gouverneurs de Ste-Foy, who were led by future Hall of Famer Patrick Roy in goal, to win the gold medal. The bronze medal game between the Cape Breton Colonels and the South Ottawa Warriors ended in a 5-5 tie. Burnaby's Cliff Ronning led the tournament in scoring and was named Most Valuable Player.

Aside from Ronning and Roy, other future National Hockey League players competing were Wendel Clark, Sylvain Côté Russ Courtnall, Tony Hrkac, Grant Jennings, Bob Joyce, and Mike Millar.

== Teams ==
Result	Team	Branch	City
1st place, gold medalist(s)	Burnaby Winter Club Travellers	British Columbia	Burnaby, BC
2nd place, silver medalist(s)	Gouverneurs de Ste-Foy	Quebec	Ste-Foy, QC
3rd place, bronze medalist(s)	Capre Breton Colonels	Nova Scotia	Sydney, NS
3rd place, bronze medalist(s)	South Ottawa Warriors	Ottawa District	Ottawa, ON
5	Andrews Maroons	Thunder Bay District	Thunder Bay, ON
6	Notre Dame Hounds	Saskatchewan	Wilcox, SK
7	Corner Brook Royals	Newfoundland	Corner Brook, NL
8	St. Catharines Central Lions	Ontario	St. Catharines, ON
9	St. Boniface Saints	Manitoba	Winnipeg, MB
10	Edmonton SSAC	Alberta	Edmonton, AB
11	Sherwood-Parkdale	Prince Edward Island	Sherwood, PE
12	Fredericton Caps	New Brunswick	Fredericton, NB

== Round robin ==
=== DC8 Flight ===
==== Standings ====
Pos	Team	Pld	W	L	D	GF	GA	GD	Pts
1	Gouverneurs de Ste-Foy	5	4	1	0	25	9	+16	8
2	Notre Dame Hounds	5	4	1	0	20	13	+7	8
3	Cape Breton Colonels	5	2	3	0	16	27	−11	4
4	St. Catharines Central Lions	5	2	3	0	15	18	−3	4
5	St. Boniface Saints	5	1	3	1	14	19	−5	3
6	Edmonton SSAC	5	1	3	1	17	21	−4	3

==== Scores ====
- Notre Dame 6 - Edmonton 1
- St. Boniface 3 - St. Catharines 3
- Ste-Foy 10 - Cape Breton 0
- Cape Breton 4 - St. Boniface 2
- Ste- Foy 3 - Edmonton 2
- Notre Dame 4 - St. Catharines 1
- Ste-Foy 6 - St. Boniface 3
- St. Catharines 5 - Edmonton 5
- Notre Dame 6 - Cape Breton 5
- Cape Breton 4 - Edmonton 3
- St. Boniface 4 - Edmonton 3
- Ste- Foy 4 - Notre Dame 1
- Edmonton 6 - Cape Breton 3
- Notre Dame 3 - St. Boniface 2
- St. Catharines 3 - Ste-Foy 2

=== DC9 Flight ===
==== Standings ====
Pos	Team	Pld	W	L	D	GF	GA	GD	Pts
1	Buranby Winter Club Travellers	5	5	0	0	31	11	+20	10
2	South Ottawa Warriors	5	4	1	0	22	7	+15	8
3	Andrews Maroons	5	3	2	0	23	19	+4	6
4	Corner Brook Royals	5	2	3	0	8	23	−15	4
5	Sherwood-Parkdale	5	1	4	0	22	25	−3	2
6	Fredericton Caps	5	0	5	0	9	30	−21	0

==== Scores ====
- Andrews 9 - Fredericton 3
- South Ottawa 6 - Sherwood-Parkdale 1
- Burnaby 7 - Corner Brook 0
- South Ottawa 3 - Andrews 0
- Corner Brook 3 - Fredericton 1
- Burnaby 7 - Sherwood-Parkdale 5
- Sherwood-Parkdale 9 - Fredericton 2
- Andrews 6 - Corner Brook 2
- Burnaby 4 - South Ottawa 2
- South Ottawa 8 - Corner Brook 0
- Andrews 7 - Sherwood-Parkdale 5
- Burnaby 6 - Fredericton 2
- Corner Brook 3 - Sherwood-Parkdale 2
- South Ottawa 3 - Fredericton 2
- Burnaby 7 - Andrews 2

== Playoffs ==
=== Quarter-finals ===
- Burnaby 7 - Corner Brook 1
- Cape Breton 2 - Notre Dame 1
- South Ottawa 6 - Andrews 3
- Ste-Foy 7 - St. Catharines 4

=== Semi-finals ===
- Burnaby 4 - Cape Breton 3 (OT)
- Ste-Foy 4 - South Ottawa 2

=== Bronze-medal game ===
- Cape Breton 5 - South Ottawa 5 (OT)

=== Gold-medal game ===
- Burnaby 3 - Ste-Foy 1

== Individual awards ==
- Most Valuable Player: Cliff Ronning (Burnaby)
- Top Scorer: Cliff Ronning (Burnaby)
- Top Forward: Martin Bouliane (Ste-Foy)
- Top Defenceman: Sylvain Côté (Ste-Foy)
- Top Goaltender: Marc Robillard (South Ottawa)
- Most Sportsmanlike Player: Steve Dunne (Corner Brook)

== See also ==
- Telus Cup
