= Greg Evtushevski =

Canadian ice hockey player (born 1965)

- Born: May 4, 1965 (age 61) St. Paul, Alberta, Canada
- Height: 5 ft 8 in (173 cm)
- Weight: 180 lb (82 kg; 12 st 12 lb)
- Position: Right wing
- Played for: AHL; Maine Mariners; IHL; Indianapolis Checkers; Kalamazoo Wings; DEL; Krefelder EV; Kassel Huskies; Frankfurt Lions
- National team: Germany
- NHL draft: 125th overall, 1983; New Jersey Devils
- Playing career: 1985–2002

Greg Evtushevski (born May 4, 1965) is a Canadian retired professional ice hockey winger. A career minor league player, Evtushevski played most of his professional career in Germany.

== Early life ==
Born in St. Paul, Alberta, Evtushevski played junior hockey with the Kamloops Blazers of the Western Hockey League.

== Career ==
Evtushevski was drafted in the seventh round (125th overall) of the 1983 NHL entry draft by the New Jersey Devils. Although he played two seasons with the Devils' minor league affiliate Maine Mariners, he never made it to the National Hockey League. He played the majority of his career in Germany, spending eight seasons in the Deutsche Eishockey Liga with Krefelder EV, the Kassel Huskies and the Frankfurt Lions. He played in the 1994 World Ice Hockey Championship for Germany. He retired in 2002.

== Career statistics ==
			Regular season					Playoffs
Season	Team	League	GP	G	A	Pts	PIM	GP	G	A	Pts	PIM
1982–83	Kamloops Junior Oilers	WHL	70	32	49	81	245	7	2	3	5	27
1983–84	Kamloops Junior Oilers	WHL	64	27	43	70	176	17	9	9	18	64
1984–85	Kamloops Blazers	WHL	71	47	93	140	167	15	11	14	25	64
1985–86	Kamloops Blazers	WHL	34	29	47	76	100	16	11	18	29	53
1985–86	Maine Mariners	AHL	21	3	4	7	60	—	—	—	—	—
1986–87	Maine Mariners	AHL	17	1	1	2	55	—	—	—	—	—
1986–87	Indianapolis Checkers	IHL	8	1	6	7	13	—	—	—	—	—
1986–87	Kalamazoo Wings	IHL	47	23	26	49	114	—	—	—	—	—
1987–88	EC Bad Nauheim	Germany2	54	58	78	136	148	—	—	—	—	—
1988–89	EC Bad Nauheim	Germany2	47	61	93	154	145	—	—	—	—	—
1989–90	ECD Sauerland	Germany2	48	49	107	156	128	—	—	—	—	—
1990–91	ECD Sauerland	Germany2	42	42	87	129	99	—	—	—	—	—
1991–92	EC Bad Nauheim	Germany2	45	43	52	95	109	—	—	—	—	—
1992–93	EC Ratingen	Germany	36	11	29	40	69	3	0	0	0	9
1993–94	Krefelder EV	Germany	44	13	33	46	50	6	2	2	4	18
1994–95	Krefelder EV	DEL	41	23	27	50	104	15	5	7	12	26
1995–96	Kassel Huskies	DEL	42	13	30	43	54	8	4	3	7	4
1996–97	Kassel Huskies	DEL	43	13	21	34	73	10	2	5	7	49
1997–98	Kassel Huskies	DEL	35	7	10	17	78	4	0	2	2	6
1998–99	Kassel Huskies	DEL	49	11	26	37	126	—	—	—	—	—
1999–00	Kassel Huskies	DEL	34	7	12	19	57	4	1	0	1	41
2000–01	Frankfurt Lions	DEL	45	5	13	18	81	—	—	—	—	—
2001–02	Frankfurt Lions	DEL	37	5	11	16	130	—	—	—	—	—
AHL totals			38	4	5	9	115	—	—	—	—	—
IHL totals			55	24	32	56	127	—	—	—	—	—
Germany totals			80	24	62	86	119	9	2	2	4	27
DEL totals			326	84	150	234	703	41	12	17	29	126

== Awards ==
- WHL West First All-Star Team – 1985
