= Vincent Riendeau =

Canadian ice hockey player

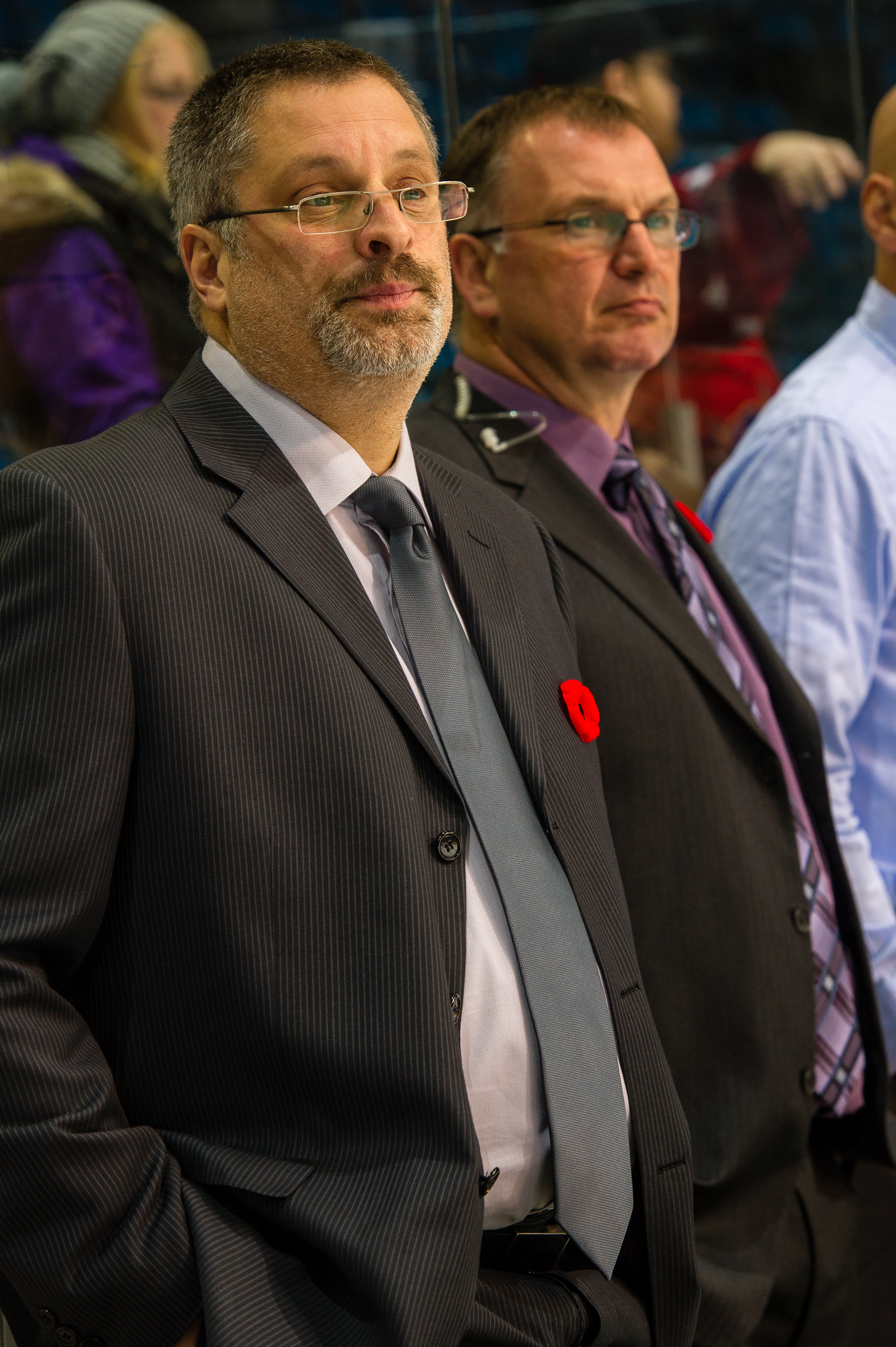
- Riendeau (left) in 2013
- Born: April 20, 1966 (age 60) Saint-Hyacinthe, Quebec, Canada
- Height: 5 ft 10 in (178 cm)
- Weight: 181 lb (82 kg; 12 st 13 lb)
- Position: Goaltender
- Caught: Left
- Played for: Montreal Canadiens; St. Louis Blues; Detroit Red Wings; Boston Bruins
- NHL draft: Undrafted
- Playing career: 1987–2001

Vincent Joseph Riendeau (born April 20, 1966) is a Canadian former professional ice hockey goaltender. During his time in the National Hockey League (NHL), which lasted from 1987 to 1995, Riendeau played for the Montreal Canadiens, St. Louis Blues, Detroit Red Wings, and the Boston Bruins. Riendeau was the first Canadian and former NHL player to sign with a professional hockey team in the Russian Superleague. As of January 2019 he has been the director of goalie development for the Canadiens.

== Playing career ==
=== Amateur career ===
Riendeau was born in Saint-Hyacinthe, Quebec. As a youth, he played in the 1978 and 1979 Quebec International Pee-Wee Hockey Tournaments with a minor ice hockey team from Drummondville.

He played junior ice hockey with the Verdun Juniors in the QMJHL during the 1983–84 season, posting a 22-13-2 record with 2 shutouts and a 4.14 goals against average. He also played 15 games for the Des Moines Buccaneers of the USHL during the same season.

The following season, Riendeau left the junior leagues to play Canadian college hockey for Sherbrooke College of the CEGEP.

Riendeau returned to the juniors for the 1985–86 season, suiting up for the Drummondville Voltigeurs of the QMJHL. With a record of 33-20-3, Riendeau was able to sign as an undrafted free agent with the Montreal Canadiens before his season ended in the juniors.

=== Career with Montreal ===
Riendeau spent the 1986–87 and 1987–88 seasons playing for Montreal's minor league affiliate, the Sherbrooke Canadiens of the AHL. In his first professional season, Riendeau was awarded the Harry "Hap" Holmes Trophy for allowing the fewest goals-against in the AHL. Despite posting winning records in the minors, Riendeau suffered in his only appearance for Montreal during the 1987–88 season, in which he allowed 5 goals in 36 minutes. With Montreal already having excellent goaltending from Patrick Roy and Brian Hayward, Riendeau was traded to St. Louis on 9 August 1988 with Sergio Momesso for Jocelyn Lemieux, Darrell May and St. Louis's 2nd choice (which became Patrice Brisebois) in the 1989 NHL entry draft.

=== Career with St. Louis ===
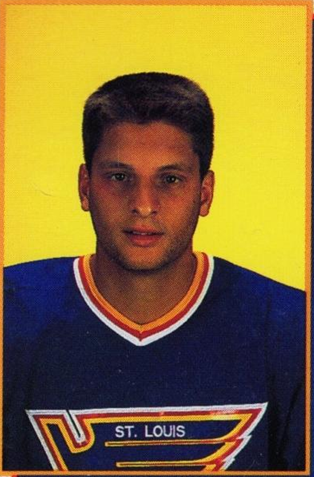
1988 card of Riendeau for St. Louis Blues

Riendeau was excited for his debut with the St. Louis Blues during the 1988–89 season. His first game was set to be on the road in Hartford, a game in which his parents traveled from his native Quebec to watch their son's opening night. However, teammate Dave Lowry hit Riendeau's shoulder with a hard shot during the pre-game warm-up, putting him out of action for the night. Despite this, Riendeau was able to establish himself as a solid member of the Blues, backing up Greg Millen for that season without seeing any time in the playoffs.

Riendeau established himself as the starting goaltender for the 1989–90 season, in which he was supported by Millen and Curtis Joseph. He was able to make his first playoff appearance with the Blues that season as well. While Joseph was the goaltender who led St. Louis in the opening round of the playoffs, Riendeau took over during the second round, in which they were eliminated by the Chicago Blackhawks.

Riendeau's most successful season in the NHL was the 1990–91 season, in which he posted a 29-9-6 record in 44 games, with Joseph serving as his backup. Riendeau once again led St. Louis into the playoffs. While they eliminated Detroit in the opening round, they lost to the Minnesota North Stars in the next round. In the playoffs, Bob Probert punched Riendeau after Riendeau pointed Probert's actions out to a referee in an unsuccessful attempt to draw a penalty.

=== Career with Detroit ===
For the start of the 1991–92 season, St. Louis opted to go with Joseph as their starting goaltender and prospects Guy Hebert and Pat Jablonski in the backup role. On 18 October 1991, Riendeau was traded to Detroit for Rick Zombo. Riendeau made his first appearance for Detroit on October 25, 1991 against the Toronto Maple Leafs, in which he suffered a knee injury 27 minutes into the game, during a shared shutout with Tim Cheveldae, and sideline him for most of the season. When Riendeau recovered, he went on to backup Cheveldae for the remainder of the season and into the playoffs, where they were eliminated by Chicago in the second round.

Riendeau continued to support Cheveldae during the 1992–93 season, appearing in 22 regular season games. Riendeau did not appear in any playoff games that season, where Detroit was eliminated in the opening round by the Toronto Maple Leafs.

=== Career with Boston ===
By the time the 1993–94 season came around, Detroit gave the starting goaltender position to Chris Osgood and designated Cheveldae as his back up. Riendeau had now become Detroit's third goaltender. After appearing in 8 games for Detroit and 10 games for their minor league affiliate, the Adirondack Red Wings of the AHL, Riendeau was traded to Boston on 17 January 1994 for a conditional 5th round draft choice in 1995 Entry Draft, which became Chad Wilchynski. Boston was able to send John Blue to the minors so that Riendeau could support Jon Casey. The duo led Boston into the playoffs, where they lost in the second round to the New Jersey Devils.

Riendeau continued his role as a backup during the 1994–95 season, supporting Blaine Lacher. Riendeau did not fare well during the regular season, posting a 3-6-1 record, leaving Boston to rely on Lacher in the playoffs, where Boston was eliminated in the opening round by New Jersey, who were the eventual Stanley Cup Champions. Riendeau did participate in one playoff game for the minor league affiliate Providence Bruins of the AHL that season. On 21 August 1995, Riendeau was released by Boston.

=== Career after the NHL ===
Riendeau spent the 1995–96 season with SC Riessersee in Germany, where he appeared in 47 games.

Riendeau returned to North America for the 1996–97 season, where he played for the Manitoba Moose of the IHL. Despite having a prolific previous season, Riendeau posted a 10-18-5 record at a minor league level.

Riendeau began to believe that his playing career was over when he received an offer from the German club Revier Löwen during the summer prior to the 1997–98 season. After appearing in 14 games, the club began to suffer financial difficulties, causing Riendeau to sign on with HC Lugano of the Swiss Nationalliga A, where he appeared in one game.

Riendeau found himself with the Ayr Scottish Eagles of the British Ice Hockey Superleague for the start of the 1998–99. Riendeau played both regular season games and in tournaments, where he played against members of the Russian Superleague. Riendeau admired the Russians' work ethic and sought to join the Russian Superleague. After playing in 32 games and tournament appearances, a clause in Riendeau's contract came into effect in January 1999 that the club had to renegotiate his contract. Riendeau was able to negotiate a deal to be released by Ayr and join HC Lada Togliatti of the Russian Superleague. Riendeau appeared in 5 regular season contests and 7 playoff contests. Riendeau continued to play for Lada Togliatti for the 1999–00 season, appearing in 16 regular season games and one playoff game.

Riendeau returned to North America for the 2000–01 season and play his final professional season with the Anchorage Aces of the WCHL. Riendeau posted an 8-10-2 record backing up Dan McIntyre.

== Post-playing career ==
Following his retirement, Riendeau became a goaltending consultant for the Toronto Maple Leafs, a move that allowed him to work with Joseph again. Riendeau then spent the 2004–05 season as the goaltender coach for the Cape Breton Screaming Eagles of the QMJHL. He is the leader of the Winter Hawks NAHA-Riendeau Goalie Camp. Riendeau worked as Goalkeeper Coach with Hamburg Freezers in Germany.

In 2012, Riendeau joined the Canadiens organization as a goaltending consultant to their AHL affiliate, the Hamilton Bulldogs. In 2014, he was named as an assistant general manager of the Bulldogs, a role he continued after the Canadiens AHL affiliate relocated to Newfoundland and Labrador and took control of the IceCaps in 2015.

As of 2019 he was the director of goalie development for the Canadiens.

== Career statistics ==
=== Regular season and playoffs ===
			Regular season									Playoffs
Season	Team	League	GP	W	L	T	MIN	GA	SO	GAA	SV%	GP	W	L	MIN	GA	SO	GAA	SV%
1983–84	Des Moines Buccaneers	USHL	15	—	—	—	753	63	0	5.02	—	—	—	—	—	—	—	—	—
1983–84	Verdun Juniors	QMJHL	41	22	13	2	2133	147	2	4.14	.870	7	4	3	403	39	0	5.80	.794
1985–86	Drummondville Voltigeurs	QMJHL	57	33	20	3	3336	215	2	3.87	.881	23	10	13	1271	106	1	5.00	.862
1986–87	Sherbrooke Canadiens	AHL	41	25	14	0	2363	114	2	2.89	.902	13	8	5	742	47	0	3.80	—
1987–88	Montreal Canadiens	NHL	1	0	0	0	36	5	0	8.33	.773	—	—	—	—	—	—	—	—
1987–88	Sherbrooke Canadiens	AHL	44	27	13	3	2521	112	4	2.67	.901	2	0	2	127	7	0	3.31	.892
1988–89	St. Louis Blues	NHL	32	11	15	5	1842	108	0	3.52	.871	—	—	—	—	—	—	—	—
1989–90	St. Louis Blues	NHL	43	17	19	5	2551	149	1	3.50	.883	8	3	4	397	24	0	3.63	.892
1990–91	St. Louis Blues	NHL	44	29	9	6	2671	134	3	3.01	.892	13	6	7	687	35	1	3.06	.881
1991–92	St. Louis Blues	NHL	3	1	2	0	157	11	0	4.20	.885	—	—	—	—	—	—	—	—
1991–92	Detroit Red Wings	NHL	2	2	0	0	87	2	0	1.38	.935	2	1	0	73	4	0	3.29	.867
1991–92	Adirondack Red Wings	AHL	3	2	1	0	179	8	0	2.68	.915	—	—	—	—	—	—	—	—
1992–93	Detroit Red Wings	NHL	22	13	4	2	1193	64	0	3.22	.877	—	—	—	—	—	—	—	—
1993–94	Detroit Red Wings	NHL	8	2	4	0	345	23	0	4.00	.824	—	—	—	—	—	—	—	—
1993–94	Adirondack Red Wings	AHL	10	6	3	0	582	30	0	3.09	.900	—	—	—	—	—	—	—	—
1993–94	Boston Bruins	NHL	18	7	6	1	976	50	1	3.07	.880	2	1	1	120	8	0	4.00	.810
1994–95	Boston Bruins	NHL	11	3	6	1	565	27	0	2.87	.878	—	—	—	—	—	—	—	—
1994–95	Providence Bruins	AHL	—	—	—	—	—	—	—	—	—	1	1	0	60	3	0	3.00	.897
1995–96	SC Riessersee	DEL	47	—	—	—	2776	184	—	4.00	.880	3	—	—	189	20	0	6.35	.861
1996–97	Manitoba Moose	IHL	41	10	18	5	1941	113	0	3.49	.889	—	—	—	—	—	—	—	—
1997–98	Revier Löwen	DEL	14	—	—	—	750	38	0	3.04	.896	—	—	—	—	—	—	—	—
1997–98	HC Lugano	NLA	1	0	0	1	65	2	0	1.85	—	—	—	—	—	—	—	—	—
1998–99	Ayr Scottish Eagles	BISL	32	15	12	5	1960	101	1	3.09	.901	—	—	—	—	—	—	—	—
1998–99	HC Lada Togliatti	RSL	5	2	0	1	235	6	0	1.53	.909	7	3	3	407	14	1	2.06	—
1999–00	HC Lada Togliatti	RSL	16	5	2	3	722	26	4	2.16	.909	1	0	1	14	2	0	8.57	—
2000–01	Anchorage Aces	WCHL	21	8	10	2	1178	81	0	4.13	.878	—	—	—	—	—	—	—	—
NHL totals			184	85	65	20	10,423	573	5	3.30	.880	25	11	12	1277	71	1	3.34	.879

=== Coaching clubs ===
==== Goalkeeper coach ====
- Toronto Maple Leafs (2001)
- Adler Mannheim (2005–2007)
- HC Fribourg-Gottéron (2007)
- Kassel Huskies (2008–2009)
- Hamburg Freezers (2010–2014)
