= Pat Jablonski =

American ice hockey goaltender (born 1967)

- Born: June 20, 1967 (age 59) Toledo, Ohio, U.S.
- Height: 6 ft 2 in (188 cm)
- Weight: 187 lb (85 kg; 13 st 5 lb)
- Position: Goaltender
- Caught: Right
- Played for: St. Louis Blues; Tampa Bay Lightning; Montreal Canadiens; Phoenix Coyotes; Carolina Hurricanes
- National team: United States
- NHL draft: 139th overall, 1985; St. Louis Blues
- Playing career: 1988–2001

Patrick David Jablonski (born June 20, 1967) is an American former professional ice hockey goaltender. Between 1989 and 1998, he played for five teams in the National Hockey League (NHL): the St. Louis Blues, Tampa Bay Lightning, Montreal Canadiens, Phoenix Coyotes, and Carolina Hurricanes.

== St. Louis Blues ==
Jablonski, who played junior hockey with the Windsor Spitfires of the Ontario Hockey League, was drafted by St. Louis 139th overall in the 1985 NHL entry draft. After three years with the Blues' farm team, the Peoria Rivermen, Jablonski was called up to the NHL at the start of the 1989–90 season and played four games with the Blues, losing all four.

He returned to Peoria until February 1991, when he replaced an injured Curtis Joseph. Jablonski shared goaltending duties with Vincent Riendeau for the remainder of the regular season, as well as for three games in a playoff series with the Minnesota North Stars. He continued as a backup for St. Louis in the 1991–92 season.

== Other teams ==
Jablonski was traded to the expansion Tampa Bay Lightning in June 1992, and was named the starting goaltender for their inaugural season of 1992–93. Jablonski played 42 games that season, including his only career NHL shutout; against the Ottawa Senators in November. He played 15 games for the Lightning in 1993–94 before being traded to the Toronto Maple Leafs in February 1994.

Jablonski never played in the NHL for Toronto, spending his time in the lockout-shortened 1994–95 season between their farm team in St. John's and the Chicago Wolves and Houston Aeros of the International Hockey League. He returned to the Blues as a free agent in the summer of 1995, but only played one game for St. Louis before being traded to the Montreal Canadiens in November.

After Patrick Roy was traded to the Colorado Avalanche that December, Jablonski shared goaltending duties with Jocelyn Thibault for the remainder of 1995–96 and into the beginning of the 1996–97 season.

== Later career ==
Jablonski was traded to the Phoenix Coyotes in January 1997. In Phoenix, he saw little playing time, only playing two games as a replacement for Nikolai Khabibulin. He signed as a free agent with Carolina in August 1997, and played five games in the 1997–98 season for the Hurricanes, with most of the rest of the season spent with the IHL's Cleveland Lumberjacks.

Jablonski never played in the NHL again. He played the 1998–99 season with the Chicago Wolves of the IHL, followed by two seasons for Västra Frölunda HC in Sweden.

== Career statistics ==
=== Regular season and playoffs ===
			Regular season									Playoffs
Season	Team	League	GP	W	L	T	MIN	GA	SO	GAA	SV%	GP	W	L	MIN	GA	SO	GAA	SV%
1984–85	Detroit Compuware Ambassadors	NAHL	29	—	—	—	1483	95	0	3.84	—	—	—	—	—	—	—	—	—
1985–86	Windsor Compuware Spitfires	OHL	29	6	16	4	1600	119	1	4.46	.865	6	0	3	263	20	0	4.56	—
1986–87	Windsor Compuware Spitfires	OHL	41	22	14	2	2328	128	3	3.30	—	12	8	4	710	38	0	3.21	—
1987–88	Windsor Compuware Spitfires	OHL	18	14	3	0	994	48	2	2.90	.890	9	8	0	537	28	0	3.13	—
1987–88	Peoria Rivermen	IHL	5	2	2	1	285	17	0	3.58	—	—	—	—	—	—	—	—	—
1987–88	Windsor Compuware Spitfires	M-Cup	—	—	—	—	—	—	—	—	—	4	3	1	240	16	0	4.00	—
1988–89	Peoria Rivermen	IHL	35	11	20	3	2051	163	1	4.77	—	3	0	2	130	13	0	6.00	—
1989–90	St. Louis Blues	NHL	4	0	3	0	208	17	0	4.89	.827	—	—	—	—	—	—	—	—
1989–90	Peoria Rivermen	IHL	36	14	17	4	2023	165	0	4.89	.867	4	1	3	223	19	0	5.11	—
1990–91	St. Louis Blues	NHL	8	2	3	3	492	25	0	3.05	.890	3	0	0	90	5	0	3.35	.857
1990–91	Peoria Rivermen	IHL	29	23	3	2	1738	87	0	3.00	.882	10	7	2	532	23	0	2.59	—
1991–92	St. Louis Blues	NHL	10	3	6	0	468	38	0	4.87	.853	—	—	—	—	—	—	—	—
1991–92	Peoria Rivermen	IHL	8	6	1	1	493	29	1	3.53	.929	—	—	—	—	—	—	—	—
1992–93	Tampa Bay Lightning	NHL	43	8	24	4	2268	150	1	3.97	.874	—	—	—	—	—	—	—	—
1993–94	Tampa Bay Lightning	NHL	15	5	6	3	834	54	0	3.89	.856	—	—	—	—	—	—	—	—
1993–94	St. John's Maple Leafs	AHL	16	12	3	1	962	49	1	3.05	.905	11	6	5	676	36	0	3.19	.893
1994–95	Chicago Wolves	IHL	4	0	4	0	216	17	0	4.71	.862	—	—	—	—	—	—	—	—
1994–95	Houston Aeros	IHL	3	1	1	1	179	9	0	3.01	.890	—	—	—	—	—	—	—	—
1995–96	St. Louis Blues	NHL	1	0	0	0	8	1	0	7.83	.800	—	—	—	—	—	—	—	—
1995–96	Montreal Canadiens	NHL	23	5	9	6	1264	62	0	2.94	.908	1	0	0	49	1	0	1.24	.941
1996–97	Montreal Canadiens	NHL	17	4	6	2	754	50	0	3.98	.886	—	—	—	—	—	—	—	—
1996–97	Phoenix Coyotes	NHL	2	0	1	0	59	2	0	2.04	.917	—	—	—	—	—	—	—	—
1997–98	Carolina Hurricanes	NHL	5	1	4	0	279	14	0	3.01	.878	—	—	—	—	—	—	—	—
1997–98	Cleveland Lumberjacks	IHL	34	13	13	6	1950	98	0	3.01	.909	—	—	—	—	—	—	—	—
1997–98	Quebec Rafales	IHL	7	3	3	0	368	21	0	3.42	.906	—	—	—	—	—	—	—	—
1998–99	Chicago Wolves	IHL	36	22	7	7	2119	106	1	3.00	.900	3	2	1	185	11	0	3.57	.869
1999–00	Västra Frölunda	SWE	27	—	—	—	1624	65	4	2.40	.926	5	—	—	298	18	0	3.62	.853
2000–01	Västra Frölunda	SWE	22	—	—	—	1328	64	1	2.89	.896	1	—	—	40	3	0	4.50	.833
NHL totals			128	28	62	18	6634	413	1	3.74	.879	4	0	0	138	6	0	2.60	.885

=== International ===
Year	Team	Event	GP	W	L	T	MIN	GA	SO	GAA	SV%
1987	United States	WJC	4	1	2	0	200	13	0	3.90	—
1993	United States	WC	2	—	—	—	62	1	0	0.96	.952
1995	United States	WC	6	—	—	—	360	15	0	2.50	.923
Junior totals			4	1	2	0	200	13	0	3.90	—
Senior totals			8	—	—	—	422	16	0	2.27	—
