= Basil McRae =

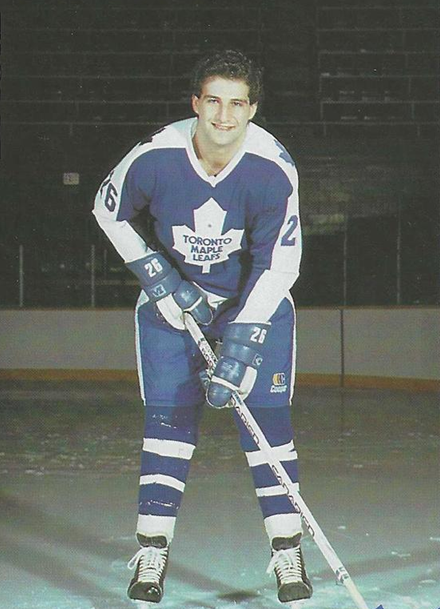
- Born: January 5, 1961 (age 65) Beaverton, Ontario, Canada
- Height: 6 ft 2 in (188 cm)
- Weight: 210 lb (95 kg; 15 st 0 lb)
- Position: Left wing
- Shot: Left
- Played for: Quebec Nordiques; Toronto Maple Leafs; Detroit Red Wings; Minnesota North Stars; Tampa Bay Lightning; St. Louis Blues; Chicago Blackhawks
- NHL draft: 87th overall, 1980; Quebec Nordiques
- Playing career: 1981–1997

Basil Paul McRae (born January 5, 1961) is a Canadian former professional ice hockey player. He is a part owner and alternate governor of the London Knights in the Ontario Hockey League and he is the director of pro scouting for the Columbus Blue Jackets. McRae was known as an enforcer with over 2,000 penalty minutes in his career.

== Playing career ==
McRae played his major junior hockey with the London Knights of the Ontario Hockey Association (OHA).

In the 1980 NHL Entry Draft, the Quebec Nordiques drafted McRae in the third round, 87th overall. He played twenty regular season games and nine playoff matches with the big club in 1981, later spending some time with the Fredericton Express of the American Hockey League (AHL). He was traded to the Toronto Maple Leafs for Richard Turmel and spent a couple of years toiling in the minors with the St. Catharines Saints of the AHL. In 1985 McRae signed as a free agent with the Detroit Red Wings but was traded back to his original team, the Nordiques along with John Ogrodnick and Doug Shedden for Brent Ashton, Gilbert Delorme and Mark Kumpel.

At the start of the 1987 season, McRae signed with the Minnesota North Stars, the team he would have the most success with. The 1987–88 season saw McRae play the whole 80 game season with the North Stars, the first time he played a full season in the NHL. He formed a tough enforcer duo along with Shane Churla, leading the league in penalty minutes with 351 in 1990. The Tampa Bay Lightning claimed him in the 1992 NHL Expansion Draft and traded him to the St. Louis Blues in 1993. After a couple of seasons in the Blues organization, McRae signed with the Chicago Blackhawks in 1996 and only managed to play in eight games before retiring from professional hockey.

McRae made a cameo appearance in the movie The Mighty Ducks along with then-teammate Mike Modano.

== Post-NHL ==
McRae is a part-owner of the London Knights with Dale Hunter and Mark Hunter. On October 21, 2014, the Knights announced that he would become the general manager and alternate governor of the team, replacing Mark Hunter, who had vacated the general manager position to become the director of player personnel for the Toronto Maple Leafs. McRae previously worked as a pro scout for the Columbus Blue Jackets and St. Louis Blues.

On July 6, 2016, McRae stepped down as general manager of the London Knights to become the director of player personnel for the Columbus Blue Jackets. He was replaced by former assistant general manager and former assistant coach of the London Knights, Rob Simpson.

== Personal life ==
McRae is the older brother of Chris McRae and is the father of Philip McRae.

== Career statistics ==
Bold indicates led league

			Regular season					Playoffs
Season	Team	League	GP	G	A	Pts	PIM	GP	G	A	Pts	PIM
1977–78	Seneca Nationals	MetJHL	36	21	38	59	80	—	—	—	—	—
1978–79	London Knights	OMJHL	66	13	28	41	79	7	0	0	0	0
1979–80	London Knights	OMJHL	67	23	35	58	116	5	0	0	0	18
1980–81	London Knights	OHL	65	29	23	52	266	—	—	—	—	—
1981–82	Quebec Nordiques	NHL	20	4	3	7	69	9	1	0	1	34
1981–82	Fredericton Express	AHL	57	11	15	26	175	—	—	—	—	—
1982–83	Quebec Nordiques	NHL	22	1	1	2	59	—	—	—	—	—
1982–83	Fredericton Express	AHL	53	22	19	41	146	12	1	5	6	75
1983–84	Toronto Maple Leafs	NHL	3	0	0	0	19	—	—	—	—	—
1983–84	St. Catharines Saints	AHL	78	14	25	39	187	6	0	0	0	40
1984–85	Toronto Maple Leafs	NHL	1	0	0	0	0	—	—	—	—	—
1984–85	St. Catharines Saints	AHL	72	30	25	55	186	—	—	—	—	—
1985–86	Detroit Red Wings	NHL	4	0	0	0	5	—	—	—	—	—
1985–86	Adirondack Red Wings	AHL	69	22	30	52	259	17	5	4	9	101
1986–87	Detroit Red Wings	NHL	36	2	2	4	193	—	—	—	—	—
1986–87	Quebec Nordiques	NHL	33	9	5	14	149	13	3	1	4	99
1987–88	Minnesota North Stars	NHL	**80**	5	11	16	382	—	—	—	—	—
1988–89	Minnesota North Stars	NHL	78	12	19	31	365	5	0	0	0	58
1989–90	Minnesota North Stars	NHL	66	9	17	26	**351**	7	1	0	1	24
1990–91	Minnesota North Stars	NHL	40	1	3	4	224	22	1	1	2	94
1991–92	Minnesota North Stars	NHL	59	5	8	13	245	—	—	—	—	—
1992–93	Tampa Bay Lightning	NHL	14	2	3	5	71	—	—	—	—	—
1992–93	St. Louis Blues	NHL	33	1	3	4	98	11	0	1	1	24
1993–94	St. Louis Blues	NHL	40	1	2	3	103	2	0	0	0	12
1994–95	Peoria Rivermen	IHL	2	0	0	0	12	—	—	—	—	—
1994–95	St. Louis Blues	NHL	21	0	5	5	72	7	2	1	3	4
1995–96	St. Louis Blues	NHL	18	1	1	2	40	2	0	0	0	0
1996–97	Chicago Blackhawks	NHL	8	0	0	0	12	—	—	—	—	—
NHL totals			576	53	83	136	2,457	78	8	4	12	349

== See also ==
- List of NHL players with 2000 career penalty minutes
