= Troy Gamble =

Canadian ice hockey player

- Born: April 7, 1967 (age 59) New Glasgow, Nova Scotia, Canada
- Height: 5 ft 11 in (180 cm)
- Weight: 195 lb (88 kg; 13 st 13 lb)
- Position: Goaltender
- Caught: Left
- Played for: Vancouver Canucks
- NHL draft: 25th overall, 1985; Vancouver Canucks
- Playing career: 1986–1996

Troy Duncan Gamble (born April 7, 1967) is a Canadian former ice hockey goaltender. He played 72 games for the Vancouver Canucks of the National Hockey League (NHL) from 1987 until 1992, as well as several teams in the minor league American Hockey League and International Hockey League until 1996. He was selected by the Canucks in the 1985 NHL entry draft while playing junior for the Medicine Hat Tigers of the Western Hockey League.

== Career ==
After winning the WHL Top Goaltender Award in the Western Hockey League for 1984-85 and being named a WHL All-Star First Team after leading the WHL in shutouts and GAA (2.86) while playing for the Medicine Hat Tigers, Gamble was drafted by the Vancouver Canucks in the second round, 25th overall, in the 1985 draft. Gamble would play another junior season for Medicine Hat before being traded mid-year to the Spokane Chiefs during the 86–87 season. He would also make his NHL debut for Vancouver on November 22, 1986, a 5–2 loss to the Edmonton Oilers. Vancouver returned him to juniors for the 87–88 season to allow him more playing time and to gain more experience before beginning his NHL career. At 19 years, 229 days at the time of his debut, Gamble was the youngest goaltender in franchise history.

In the summer of 1988, the Canucks sent the 21-year-old Gamble and Jack McIlhargey to Russia to support a relationship that would later result in Soviet stars Igor Larionov and Vladimir Krutov joining the Canucks. Gamble endured rigorous off-season training with Dynamo Moscow for two weeks and another two weeks with Spartak.

Gamble's NHL career began well, as in his rookie season of 1990-91 he would post a 16-16-6 record and a 3.45 GAA while appearing in 47 games, outplaying incumbent starter Kirk McLean, who posted a 10-22-3 record with a 3.99 GAA. Gamble would even start in the post-season for the Canucks playing a memorable Smythe Division semifinals match-up against the Los Angeles Kings. However, due to reoccurring concussion problems Gamble's career was derailed by PCS symptoms including nausea and recurring headaches.

Gamble spent the majority of his career in the minors. He played for 5 teams after his 1991 success and retired following the 1995–96 season as a member of the Houston Aeros. After he retired from hockey he did color commentary for select Aeros games on their radio and internet broadcasts.

Gamble later took a manager's job with M-I SWACO, a Texas-based company specializing in global oil and gas production. The work took him on trips through the Middle East, including three years' residence in Libya.

== Family tragedy ==
On March 11, 2010, it was reported that Troy's son Garrett Gamble was killed in Afghanistan while serving as a member of the United States Marine Corps. After attending Stephen F. Austin High in Sugar Land, Texas, Gamble joined the Marine Corps and a family friend stated that “This was something he wanted to do, even before he got out of high school,” and that “He was anxious to go.” In October 2009 Gamble was sent to Afghanistan as a SAW gunner near the front lines. Gamble, 20, was killed after stepping on a land mine device while on patrol in Helmand province, Afghanistan.

== Career statistics ==
=== Regular season and playoffs ===
			Regular season									Playoffs
Season	Team	League	GP	W	L	T	MIN	GA	SO	GAA	SV%	GP	W	L	MIN	GA	SO	GAA	SV%
1983–84	Hobbema Hawks	AJHL	22	6	19	1	1102	90	0	4.90	—	—	—	—	—	—	—	—	—
1984–85	Medicine Hat Tigers	WHL	37	27	6	2	2095	100	3	2.86	—	2	1	1	120	9	0	4.50	—
1985–86	Medicine Hat Tigers	WHL	45	28	11	0	2264	142	0	3.76	—	11	5	4	530	31	0	3.51	—
1986–87	Vancouver Canucks	NHL	1	0	1	0	60	4	0	4.03	.818	—	—	—	—	—	—	—	—
1986–87	Medicine Hat Tigers	WHL	11	7	3	0	646	46	0	4.27	—	—	—	—	—	—	—	—	—
1986–87	Spokane Chiefs	WHL	38	17	17	1	2155	163	0	4.54	.862	5	0	5	298	35	0	7.05	—
1987–88	Spokane Chiefs	WHL	67	36	26	1	3824	235	0	3.69	—	15	7	8	875	56	1	3.84	—
1988–89	Vancouver Canucks	NHL	5	2	3	0	302	138	0	2.38	.913	—	—	—	—	—	—	—	—
1988–89	Milwaukee Admirals	IHL	42	23	9	0	2198	138	0	3.77	.875	11	5	5	640	35	0	3.28	—
1989–90	Milwaukee Admirals	IHL	56	22	21	4	2779	160	2	4.21	—	5	2	2	216	19	0	5.28	—
1990–91	Vancouver Canucks	NHL	47	16	16	6	2433	140	1	3.45	.879	4	1	3	249	16	0	3.85	.880
1991–92	Vancouver Canucks	NHL	19	4	9	3	1009	73	0	4.34	.859	—	—	—	—	—	—	—	—
1991–92	Milwaukee Admirals	IHL	9	2	4	2	521	31	0	3.57	—	—	—	—	—	—	—	—	—
1992–93	Hamilton Canucks	AHL	14	1	10	2	769	62	0	4.84	.846	—	—	—	—	—	—	—	—
1992–93	Cincinnati Cyclones	IHL	33	11	18	2	1762	134	0	4.56	.872	—	—	—	—	—	—	—	—
1993–94	Kalamazoo Wings	IHL	48	25	13	5	2607	146	2	3.36	.899	2	0	1	80	7	0	5.25	.851
1994–95	Houston Aeros	IHL	43	18	17	5	2421	132	1	3.27	.900	4	1	3	203	16	0	4.72	.867
1995–96	Houston Aeros	IHL	52	16	25	5	2722	174	0	3.83	.884	—	—	—	—	—	—	—	—
NHL totals			72	22	29	9	3804	229	1	3.61	.875	4	1	3	249	16	0	3.85	.880

== Awards ==
- WHL East First All-Star Team – 1985
- WHL West First All-Star Team – 1988
