= Scott Robinson (ice hockey) =

Canadian ice hockey player

- Born: March 29, 1964 (age 61) 100 Mile House, British Columbia, Canada
- Height: 6 ft 2 in (188 cm)
- Weight: 200 lb (91 kg; 14 st 4 lb)
- Position: Right wing
- Shot: Right
- Played for: Minnesota North Stars
- National team: Canada
- NHL draft: Undrafted
- Playing career: 1988–1994

Scott Douglas Robinson (born March 29, 1964) is a Canadian retired professional ice hockey player and coach. He played one game in the National Hockey League for the Minnesota North Stars in the 1989–90 season, on February 4, 1990 against the New York Rangers. The rest of his professional career was spent in the IHL with the Kalamazoo Wings and Milwaukee Admirals.

Robinson was born in 100 Mile House, British Columbia. After his playing career he coached the Cowichan Valley Capitals of the British Columbia Hockey League from 2003 to 2010.

== Career statistics ==
=== Regular season and playoffs ===
			Regular season					Playoffs
Season	Team	League	GP	G	A	Pts	PIM	GP	G	A	Pts	PIM
1982–83	Seattle Breakers	WHL	63	14	23	37	151	4	3	0	3	9
1983–84	Seattle Breakers	WHL	44	17	18	35	105	5	0	1	1	25
1984–85	Seattle Breakers	WHL	64	44	53	97	106	—	—	—	—	—
1985–86	University of Calgary	CIAU	18	3	9	12	61	—	—	—	—	—
1986–87	University of Calgary	U Sports	19	12	14	26	95	5	3	3	6	10
1986–87	Canadian National Team	Intl	1	1	0	1	0	—	—	—	—	—
1987–88	University of Calgary	U Sports	21	14	14	28	64	6	3	4	7	12
1988–89	Kalamazoo Wings	IHL	49	14	16	30	127	6	1	2	3	21
1989–90	Kalamazoo Wings	IHL	48	13	12	25	97	10	4	7	11	21
1989–90	Minnesota North Stars	NHL	1	0	0	0	2	—	—	—	—	—
1990–91	Kalamazoo Wings	IHL	27	7	9	16	36	11	2	1	3	32
1991–92	Kalamazoo Wings	IHL	78	29	27	56	58	11	2	6	8	86
1992–93	Milwaukee Admirals	IHL	27	13	10	23	33	3	0	0	0	0
1993–94	Milwaukee Admirals	IHL	24	8	3	11	52	—	—	—	—	—
IHL totals			253	84	77	161	403	41	9	16	25	160
NHL totals			1	0	0	0	2	—	—	—	—	—

== Awards ==
- WHL West Second All-Star Team – 1985

== See also ==
- List of players who played only one game in the NHL
