= Mark Janssens =

Canadian ice hockey player

- Born: May 19, 1968 (age 57) Surrey, British Columbia, Canada
- Height: 6 ft 3 in (191 cm)
- Weight: 216 lb (98 kg; 15 st 6 lb)
- Position: Centre
- Shot: Left
- Played for: New York Rangers; Minnesota North Stars; Hartford Whalers; Mighty Ducks of Anaheim; New York Islanders; Phoenix Coyotes; Chicago Blackhawks
- NHL draft: 72nd overall, 1986; New York Rangers
- Playing career: 1988–2001

Mark Francis Janssens (born May 19, 1968) is a Canadian former professional ice hockey forward.

Janssens started his National Hockey League career with the New York Rangers in 1988. He also played for the Minnesota North Stars, Hartford Whalers, Mighty Ducks of Anaheim, New York Islanders, Phoenix Coyotes, and Chicago Blackhawks. He left the NHL after the 2001 season.

On September 11, 2001, Janssens was heading to Columbia University and saw one of the planes hit the World Trade Center.

Janssens is currently employed at Access Global Trading, based out of Stamford, Connecticut.

== Career statistics ==
=== Regular season and playoffs ===
			Regular season					Playoffs
Season	Team	League	GP	G	A	Pts	PIM	GP	G	A	Pts	PIM
1983–84	Surrey Eagles	BCJHL	40	40	58	98	64	—	—	—	—	—
1984–85	Regina Pats	WHL	70	8	22	30	51	5	1	1	2	0
1985–86	Regina Pats	WHL	71	25	38	63	146	9	0	2	2	17
1986–87	Regina Pats	WHL	68	24	38	62	209	3	0	1	1	14
1987–88	Regina Pats	WHL	71	39	51	90	202	4	3	4	7	6
1987–88	New York Rangers	NHL	1	0	0	0	0	—	—	—	—	—
1987–88	Colorado Rangers	IHL	6	2	2	4	24	12	3	2	5	20
1988–89	New York Rangers	NHL	5	0	0	0	0	—	—	—	—	—
1988–89	Denver Rangers	IHL	38	19	19	38	104	4	3	0	3	18
1989–90	New York Rangers	NHL	80	5	8	13	161	9	2	1	3	10
1990–91	New York Rangers	NHL	67	9	7	16	172	6	3	0	3	6
1991–92	New York Rangers	NHL	4	0	0	0	5	—	—	—	—	—
1991–92	Binghamton Rangers	AHL	55	10	23	33	109	—	—	—	—	—
1991–92	Minnesota North Stars	NHL	3	0	0	0	0	—	—	—	—	—
1991–92	Kalamazoo Wings	IHL	2	0	0	0	2	11	1	2	3	22
1992–93	Hartford Whalers	NHL	76	12	17	29	237	—	—	—	—	—
1993–94	Hartford Whalers	NHL	84	2	10	12	137	—	—	—	—	—
1994–95	Hartford Whalers	NHL	46	2	5	7	93	—	—	—	—	—
1995–96	Hartford Whalers	NHL	81	2	7	9	155	—	—	—	—	—
1996–97	Hartford Whalers	NHL	54	2	4	6	90	—	—	—	—	—
1996–97	Mighty Ducks of Anaheim	NHL	12	0	2	2	47	11	0	0	0	15
1997–98	Mighty Ducks of Anaheim	NHL	55	4	5	9	116	—	—	—	—	—
1997–98	New York Islanders	NHL	12	0	0	0	34	—	—	—	—	—
1997–98	Phoenix Coyotes	NHL	7	1	2	3	4	1	0	0	0	2
1998–99	Chicago Blackhawks	NHL	60	1	0	1	65	—	—	—	—	—
1999–00	Chicago Blackhawks	NHL	36	0	6	6	73	—	—	—	—	—
2000–01	Chicago Blackhawks	NHL	28	0	0	0	33	—	—	—	—	—
2000–01	Norfolk Admirals	AHL	28	3	9	12	41	—	—	—	—	—
2000–01	Houston Aeros	IHL	4	2	1	3	2	—	—	—	—	—
NHL totals			711	40	73	113	1,422	27	5	1	6	33
