= Cliff Ronning =

Canadian ice hockey player (b. 1965)

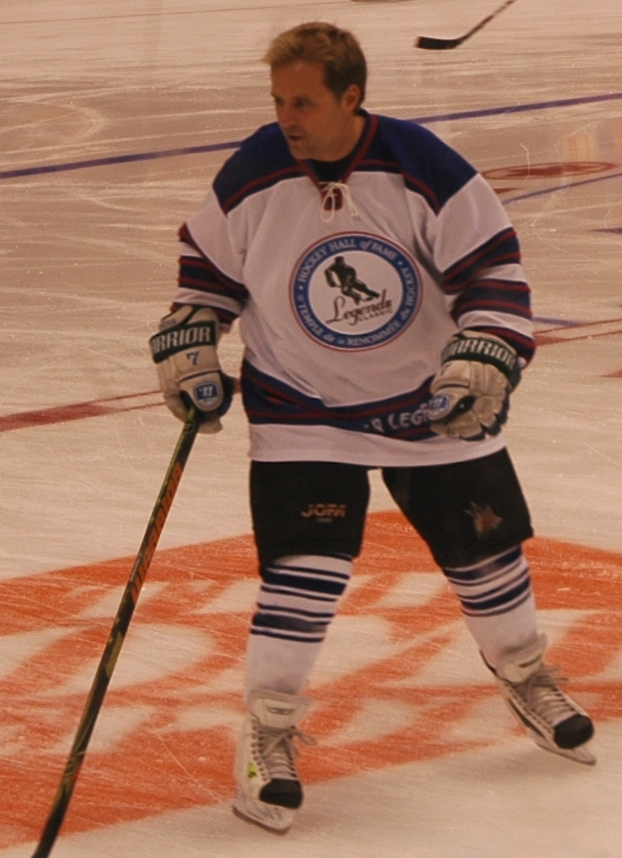
- Ronning in 2008
- Born: October 1, 1965 (age 60) Burnaby, British Columbia, Canada
- Height: 5 ft 8 in (173 cm)
- Weight: 170 lb (77 kg; 12 st 2 lb)
- Position: Centre
- Shot: Left
- Played for: St. Louis Blues; Vancouver Canucks; Phoenix Coyotes; Nashville Predators; Los Angeles Kings; Minnesota Wild; New York Islanders; Asiago Hockey AS
- National team: Canada
- NHL draft: 134th overall, 1984; St. Louis Blues
- Playing career: 1985–2004

Medal record

Representing Canada

World Championships
Silver medal – second place	1991 Finland	

Clifford John Ronning (born October 1, 1965) is a Canadian former professional ice hockey forward. He was selected by the St. Louis Blues in the seventh round of the 1984 NHL entry draft, 134th overall. During a National Hockey League (NHL) career that spanned 18 years, Ronning played for the Blues, Vancouver Canucks, Phoenix Coyotes, Nashville Predators, Los Angeles Kings, Minnesota Wild and New York Islanders.

== Playing career ==
Ronning played minor hockey in Burnaby. He led his midget team to the 1982 Air Canada Cup, where they won the gold medal. Ronning was named Most Valuable player and led the tournament in scoring. Prior to being drafted, he played in the Western Hockey League for the New Westminster Bruins, displaying the same excellent scoring touch. In 1983–84, Ronning's draft year, he posted 136 points in 71 games, earning the Stewart "Butch" Paul Memorial Trophy as the league's rookie of the year. Due to his small stature (Ronning was 5'8"), he was not drafted until the seventh round, when the St. Louis Blues picked him 134th overall. The next season, he returned to New Westminster and accumulated an astonishing 197 points, establishing a WHL record (he was later surpassed by Rob Brown's 212-point season in 1986–87). Accordingly, Ronning earned the WHL Most Valuable Player Award and the Bob Brownridge Memorial Trophy as the league's leading scorer. Recording just 20 penalty minutes, he was also named the Most Sportsmanlike Player.

After Ronning's record setting season, he joined the Canadian National Team, with whom he played for one and a half seasons. During this stint, Ronning made his first appearance in the NHL with the Blues, playing five games in the 1986 Stanley Cup Playoffs. Ronning began the next season with the National Team again before joining the Blues for the remainder of 1986–87.

Ronning did not, however, find his full stride in St. Louis. He spent part of 1988–89 with the Blues' International Hockey League affiliate, the Peoria Rivermen, and played the entirety of the following season in Italy with HC Asiago. When he returned to the Blues in 1990–91, he was traded to his hometown team, the Vancouver Canucks, along with Geoff Courtnall, Robert Dirk, Sergio Momesso, and a fifth-round draft pick (Brian Loney) in exchange for Garth Butcher and Dan Quinn.

Ronning quickly became a key element on the rapidly improving Canucks. In 1992–93, he posted a career-high 29 goals and 85 points. On April 15, 1993, in a game against the Los Angeles Kings, he nearly tied Bryan Trottier's record for most points in a single period, notching 3 goals and 2 assists in the third (Trottier had six). The following season, Ronning helped the Canucks on their run to the 1994 Stanley Cup Final, which they lost in seven games to the New York Rangers. He played the seventh game with a broken hand.

Spending another two seasons in Vancouver, Ronning became a free agent after the 1995–96 season and signed with the Phoenix Coyotes for their first season after moving from Winnipeg. Following just over two seasons in Phoenix, Ronning was dealt with Richard Lintner to the Nashville Predators for future considerations.

As he joined the Predators in their expansion year, he took on a leadership role with the fledgling Predators, who finished second-to-last in their first NHL season. In all four seasons with the Predators, Ronning led the team in scoring, twice exceeding 60 points. He played an important role in mentoring young players, such as David Legwand.

At the 2001–02 trade deadline, the Predators sent Ronning to the Los Angeles Kings, who expected him to help them in the playoffs. In the off-season, he was traded from Los Angeles to yet another recent expansion team, the Minnesota Wild in their third year. Ronning was a veteran presence and still an able scorer, recording 48 points, as the Wild reached the Western Conference Finals before being swept by the Mighty Ducks of Anaheim.

In 2003–04, Ronning signed with the New York Islanders, mostly playing as a powerplay specialist, recording 24 points in 40 games played. As the NHL lockout suspended play, Ronning was inactive the following season. When the NHL resumed, Ronning announced his decision to retire on February 15, 2006. Cliff Ronning was involved in two of the most notable games of Patrick Roy's career. He played against Roy in the 1982 Air Canada Cup midget tournament. Ronning's team beat Roy's Sainte-Foy Gouverneurs, and it was the last game of Roy's midget career. On April 22, 2003, Ronning played for the Minnesota Wild, and played in Roy's final NHL playoff game.

Even though I was always one of the smallest kids on my hockey team growing up, I never stopped dreaming about playing in the NHL, so having the ability to live out that dream was unbelievable. I certainly hope that kids who are also small in stature but not in heart will look at me and other similar players and know that their dream can come true through hard work and dedication to the game.

— Cliff Ronning

== Awards and achievements ==
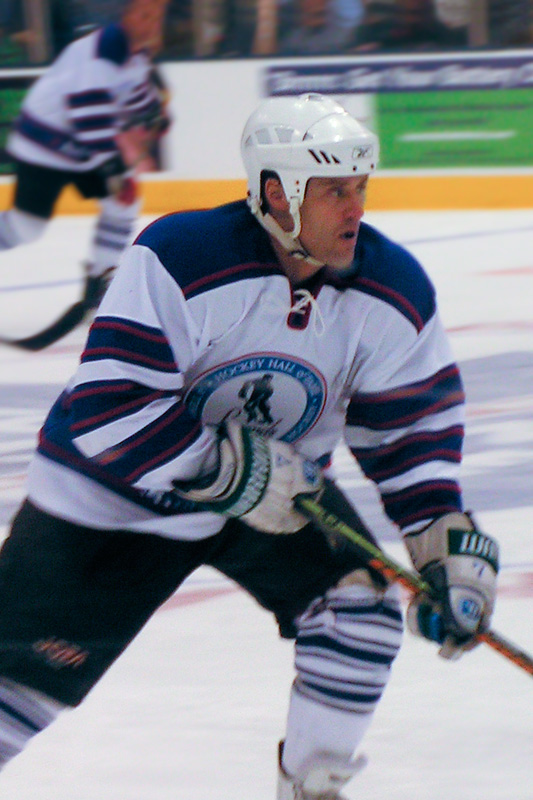
Cliff Ronning skating with the greats

- Air Canada Cup Most Valuable Player - 1982
- BCJHL Coastal Division First All-Star Team - 1983
- WHL Rookie of the Year - 1984
- WHL West Second All-Star Team – 1984
- WHL West First All-Star Team - 1985
- WHL Most Valuable Player - 1985
- Bob Brownridge Memorial Trophy (WHL leading scorer) - 1985
- WHL Most Sportsmanlike Player - 1985

== Records ==
- WHL league record; most points in a season - 197 in 1984–85 (surpassed by Rob Brown; 212 points in 1986–87)

== Personal life ==
Ronning and his wife, Ivana have four children; three daughters Taryn, Kristin and Carly and one son, Ty. Ronning returned to live in Vancouver after his retirement. He plays with the Old-timers' Hockey Challenge and coaches a spring hockey team, the Vancouver Selects. Ronning has participated in the research and development of a better hockey stick. In 2009, Cliff Ronning and Ron Kunisaki formed BASE Hockey Labs. President and Co-founder Ron Kunisaki founded Innovative Hockey, Inc. in 1993 and built the industry's largest high-performance OEM supplier before selling to Warrior Hockey in 2005. Vice-president and Co-founder Cliff Ronning heads up Base Hockey's Shooting Analysis and Custom Fitting protocol in Burnaby, British Columbia.

His son Ty was drafted by the New York Rangers in the seventh round of the 2016 NHL entry draft and as of 2024 plays as a forward for the Eisbären Berlin.

== Career statistics ==
=== Regular season and playoffs ===
			Regular season					Playoffs
Season	Team	League	GP	G	A	Pts	PIM	GP	G	A	Pts	PIM
1982–83	New Westminster Royals	BCHL	52	83	68	151	22	—	—	—	—	—
1983–84	New Westminster Bruins	WHL	71	69	67	136	10	9	8	13	21	10
1984–85	New Westminster Bruins	WHL	70	89	108	197	20	11	10	14	24	4
1985–86	Canada	Intl	71	55	63	118	53	—	—	—	—	—
1985–86	St. Louis Blues	NHL	—	—	—	—	—	5	1	1	2	2
1986–87	Canada	Intl	26	17	16	33	12	—	—	—	—	—
1986–87	St. Louis Blues	NHL	42	11	14	25	6	4	0	1	1	0
1987–88	St. Louis Blues	NHL	26	5	8	13	12	—	—	—	—	—
1988–89	St. Louis Blues	NHL	64	24	31	55	18	7	1	3	4	0
1988–89	Peoria Rivermen	IHL	12	11	20	31	8	—	—	—	—	—
1989–90	HC Asiago	ITA	36	67	49	113	29	6	7	12	19	4
1990–91	St. Louis Blues	NHL	48	14	18	32	10	—	—	—	—	—
1990–91	Vancouver Canucks	NHL	11	6	6	12	0	6	6	3	9	12
1991–92	Vancouver Canucks	NHL	80	24	47	71	42	13	8	5	13	6
1992–93	Vancouver Canucks	NHL	79	29	56	85	30	12	2	9	11	6
1993–94	Vancouver Canucks	NHL	76	25	43	68	42	24	5	10	15	16
1994–95	Vancouver Canucks	NHL	41	6	19	25	27	11	3	5	8	2
1995–96	Vancouver Canucks	NHL	79	22	45	67	42	6	0	2	2	6
1996–97	Phoenix Coyotes	NHL	69	19	32	51	26	7	0	7	7	12
1997–98	Phoenix Coyotes	NHL	80	11	44	55	36	6	1	3	4	4
1998–99	Phoenix Coyotes	NHL	7	2	5	7	2	—	—	—	—	—
1998–99	Nashville Predators	NHL	72	18	35	53	40	—	—	—	—	—
1999–2000	Nashville Predators	NHL	82	26	36	62	34	—	—	—	—	—
2000–01	Nashville Predators	NHL	80	19	43	62	28	—	—	—	—	—
2001–02	Nashville Predators	NHL	67	18	31	49	24	—	—	—	—	—
2001–02	Los Angeles Kings	NHL	14	1	4	5	8	4	0	1	1	2
2002–03	Minnesota Wild	NHL	80	17	31	48	24	17	2	7	9	4
2003–04	New York Islanders	NHL	40	9	15	24	2	4	0	0	0	0
NHL totals			1,137	306	563	869	453	126	29	57	86	72

=== International ===
Year	Team	Event	Result	GP	G	A	Pts	PIM
1991	Canada	WC	2nd place, silver medalist(s)	10	1	4	5	8
Senior totals				10	1	4	5	8

== Transactions ==
- June 9, 1984 - Drafted in the 7th round, 134th overall, by the St. Louis Blues
- March 5, 1991 - Traded by St. Louis with Geoff Courtnall, Robert Dirk, Sergio Momesso and a 5th round draft pick (Brian Loney) to the Vancouver Canucks in exchange for Garth Butcher and Dan Quinn
- July 1, 1996 - Signs with the Phoenix Coyotes as a free agent
- October 31, 1998- Traded by Phoenix with Richard Lintner to the Nashville Predators for future considerations
- March 16, 2002 - Traded by Nashville to the Los Angeles Kings for Jere Karalahti and a 4th round draft pick (Teemu Lassila)
- June 22, 2002 - Traded by Los Angeles to the Minnesota Wild in exchange for a 4th round draft pick (Aaron Rome)
- January 9, 2004 - Signs with the New York Islanders as a free agent
- February 15, 2006 - Announces his retirement

== See also ==
- List of NHL players with 1,000 games played
