= 1984–85 WHL season =

Junior ice hockey season

- League: Western Hockey League
- Sport: Ice hockey
- Teams: 14

Regular season
- Scotty Munro Memorial Trophy: Prince Albert Raiders (1)
- Season MVP: Cliff Ronning (New Westminster Bruins)
- Top scorer: Cliff Ronning (New Westminster Bruins)

Playoffs
- Finals champions: Prince Albert Raiders (1)
- Runners-up: Kamloops Blazers

WHL seasons
- 1983–84 1985–86

1984–85 CHL season
- League: Canadian Hockey League
- Sport: Ice hockey
- Teams: 41

OHL

QMJHL

WHL

Memorial Cup
- Finals champions: Prince Albert Raiders (WHL) (1st title)
- Runners-up: Shawinigan Cataractes (QMJHL)

The 1984–85 WHL season was the 19th season of the Western Hockey League (WHL), featuring fourteen teams and a 72-game regular season. In their third season since joining the WHL, the Prince Albert Raiders put together a dominant run, winning 58 games and the Scotty Munro Memorial Trophy for best regular season record. In the playoffs, the Raiders won the President's Cup, defeating the Kamloops Blazers in the championship series. The Raiders thus earned a berth at the 1985 Memorial Cup tournament, where they won the Memorial Cup title.

This was the first season for the Moose Jaw Warriors, with the Winnipeg Warriors relocating to Moose Jaw prior to the season. This brought WHL hockey back to Moose Jaw for the first time since 1968, when the Moose Jaw Canucks left the league. In addition, the Kamloops Junior Oilers became a community-owned club and were renamed the Blazers.

== Team changes ==
- The Winnipeg Warriors are relocated to Moose Jaw, Saskatchewan, becoming the Moose Jaw Warriors.
- The Kamloops Junior Oilers are renamed the Kamloops Blazers.

== Regular season ==
=== Final standings ===
East Division
Pos	Team	Pld	W	L	T	GF	GA	Pts
1	x – Prince Albert Raiders	72	58	11	3	481	255	119
2	x – Medicine Hat Tigers	72	53	17	2	355	224	108
3	x – Regina Pats	72	43	28	1	387	298	87
4	x – Calgary Wranglers	72	39	31	2	382	351	80
5	x – Lethbridge Broncos	72	30	40	2	295	322	62
6	x – Saskatoon Blades	72	29	41	2	309	378	60
7	Moose Jaw Warriors	72	21	50	1	320	438	43
8	Brandon Wheat Kings	72	17	54	1	264	481	35

x – qualified for playoffs

West Division
Pos	Team	Pld	W	L	T	GF	GA	Pts
1	x – Kamloops Blazers	71	52	17	2	423	293	106
2	x – New Westminster Bruins	72	41	29	2	379	302	84
3	x – Kelowna Wings	72	29	39	4	359	367	62
4	x – Portland Winter Hawks	72	27	44	1	365	442	55
5	Seattle Breakers	72	25	44	3	320	416	53
6	Victoria Cougars	71	24	43	4	314	385	52

x – qualified for playoffs

=== Scoring leaders ===
Note: GP = Games played; G = Goals; A = Assists; Pts = Points; PIM = Penalties in minutes

Player	Team	GP	G	A	Pts	PIM
Cliff Ronning	New Westminster Bruins	70	89	108	197	20
Dan Hodgson	Prince Albert Raiders	64	70	112	182	86
Mark Mackay	Moose Jaw Warriors	71	66	74	140	25
Greg Evtushevski	Kamloops Blazers	71	47	93	140	157
Ray Podloski	Portland Winter Hawks	67	63	75	138	41
Al Conroy	Medicine Hat Tigers	68	41	97	138	150
Gord Walker	Kamloops Blazers	66	67	67	134	76
Doug Moffat	Calgary Wranglers	71	62	65	127	72
Simon Wheeldon	Victoria Cougars	67	50	76	126	78
Tony Grenier	Prince Albert Raiders	71	62	58	120	38

== 1985 WHL Playoffs ==
=== First round ===
- Prince Albert earned a bye
- Medicine Hat earned a bye
- Regina defeated Saskatoon 3 games to 0
- Calgary defeated Lethbridge 3 games to 1

=== Division semi-finals ===
- Prince Albert defeated Calgary 4 games to 0
- Medicine Hat defeated Regina 4 games to 1
- Kamloops defeated Portland 5 games to 1
- New Westminster defeated Kelowna 5 games to 1

=== Division finals ===
- Prince Albert defeated Medicine Hat 4 games to 1
- Kamloops defeated New Westminster 5 games to 0

=== WHL Championship ===
- Prince Albert defeated Kamloops 4 games to 0

== WHL awards ==
Most Valuable Player: Cliff Ronning, New Westminster Bruins
Scholastic Player of the Year – Daryl K. (Doc) Seaman Trophy: Mark Janssens, Regina Pats
Top Scorer – Bob Clarke Trophy: Cliff Ronning, New Westminster Bruins
Most Sportsmanlike Player: Cliff Ronning, New Westminster Bruins
Top Defenseman – Bill Hunter Trophy: Wendel Clark, Saskatoon Blades
Rookie of the Year – Jim Piggott Memorial Trophy: Mark Mackay, Moose Jaw Warriors
Top Goaltender – Del Wilson Trophy: Troy Gamble, Medicine Hat Tigers
Coach of the Year – Dunc McCallum Memorial Trophy: Doug Sauter, Medicine Hat Tigers
Regular season champions – Scotty Munro Memorial Trophy: Prince Albert Raiders

== All-Star teams ==
East Division
	First Team		Second Team	
Goal	Troy Gamble	Medicine Hat Tigers	Gary Johnson	Medicine Hat Tigers
Defense	Wendel Clark	Saskatoon Blades	Doug Houda	Calgary Wranglers
Defense	John Miner (tied)	Regina Pats	Emanuel Viveiros	Prince Albert Raiders
Defense	Dana Murzyn (tied)	Calgary Wranglers	-	-
Center	Dan Hodgson	Prince Albert Raiders	Mark MacKay	Moose Jaw Warriors
Left Wing	Bob Bassen	Medicine Hat Tigers	Tony Grenier	Prince Albert Raiders
Right Wing	Ken Quinney	Calgary Wranglers	Dave Pasin	Prince Albert Raiders
West Division
	First Team		Second Team	
Goal	Randy Hansch (tied)	Victoria Cougars	-	-
Goal	Daryl Reaugh (tied)	Kamloops Blazers	-	-
Defense	Todd Carnelley	Kamloops Blazers	John Kordic	Seattle Breakers
Defense	Mark Ferner	Kamloops Blazers	Jeff Sharples	Kelowna Wings
Center	Cliff Ronning	New Westminster Bruins	Simon Wheeldon	Victoria Cougars
Left Wing	Gordie Walker	Kamloops Blazers	Jeff Rohlicek	Kelowna Wings
Right Wing	Greg Evtushevski	Kamloops Blazers	Scott Robinson	Seattle Breakers

== See also ==
- 1985 NHL entry draft
- 1984 in sports
- 1985 in sports

Preceded by 1983–84 WHL season	WHL seasons	Succeeded by 1985–86 WHL season
