= Tim Cheveldae =

Canadian ice hockey player (born 1968)

- Born: February 15, 1968 (age 58) Melville, Saskatchewan, Canada
- Height: 5 ft 11 in (180 cm)
- Weight: 175 lb (79 kg; 12 st 7 lb)
- Position: Goaltender
- Caught: Left
- Played for: Detroit Red Wings; Winnipeg Jets; Boston Bruins
- NHL draft: 64th overall, 1986; Detroit Red Wings
- Playing career: 1988–1997

Timothy M. Cheveldae (born February 15, 1968) is a Canadian former professional ice hockey goaltender. During his ten-year National Hockey League career, he played with the Detroit Red Wings, Winnipeg Jets, and Boston Bruins.

== Playing career ==
Cheveldae began his junior ice hockey playing career in the 1985–86 WHL season with the Saskatoon Blades. Cheveldae was selected in the 4th round (64th overall) by the Detroit Red Wings in the 1986 NHL entry draft. Cheveldae remained with the Blades until the end of the 1987–88 season before leaving for the professional ranks.

For the 1988–89 season, Cheveldae went to the Red Wings' minor league affiliate, the Adirondack Red Wings, in the American Hockey League. His level of play earned him a call up to the NHL, where he served two games in net for the Red Wings, and made him the fourth goaltender on the Red Wings roster behind Greg Stefan, Glen Hanlon, and Sam St. Laurent.

While Detroit's goaltending lineup would remain the same for the 1990–91 season, Cheveldae ascended the depth chart, going from goaltending in the AHL to being in Detroit's goaltending tandem with Hanlon. Stefan suffered career-ending injuries, while St. Laurent never ascended beyond the role of a third goaltender at the NHL level despite his minor league success.

From the 1990–91 season to the 1992–93 season, Cheveldae was Detroit's starting goaltender. With Detroit not settling on a consistent backup, Cheveldae was Detroit's goaltending workhorse for those seasons, playing no fewer than 65 games in each of those seasons and playing an astounding 72 games during the 1991–92 season, earning him the right to play in the 1992 NHL All-Star Game. While Cheveldae had success during the regular season, the team would never go deep into the playoffs during those seasons, leaving Cheveldae to be the scapegoat for Detroit's inability to succeed in the playoffs.

In the 1993–94 season, Chris Osgood emerged from the minors to become Detroit's new starting goaltender. Despite having a successful season, Cheveldae was traded to the Winnipeg Jets as part of a package deal that brought Bob Essensa and Sergei Bautin to Detroit on March 8, 1994. Cheveldae missed the playoffs with the Jets.

While in Winnipeg, Cheveldae never achieved the level of success he had with the Red Wings. While he served the Jets as their starting goaltender during the abbreviated season in 1994–95 and the beginning of the 1995–96 season, the Jets eventually opted to go with Nikolai Khabibulin as their starter. Cheveldae was traded to the Philadelphia Flyers on February 27, 1996, for Dominic Roussel, and he was assigned to the minor league affiliate Hershey Bears.

On August 21, 1996, Cheveldae signed a one-year contract with the Boston Bruins. That season, he played in two games while spending most of his time on loan to the Fort Wayne Komets of the International Hockey League. He was not re-signed at the end of the season. Cheveldae played his final season of professional hockey during the 1997–98 season, skating for the Las Vegas Thunder of the IHL.

== Career statistics ==
=== Regular season and playoffs ===
			Regular season									Playoffs
Season	Team	League	GP	W	L	T	MIN	GA	SO	GAA	SV%	GP	W	L	MIN	GA	SO	GAA	SV%
1984–85	Melville Millionaires	SJHL	23	—	—	—	1167	98	0	5.04	—	—	—	—	—	—	—	—	—
1985–86	Saskatoon Blades	WHL	36	21	10	3	2030	165	0	4.88	—	8	6	2	460	29	0	3.63	—
1986–87	Saskatoon Blades	WHL	33	20	11	0	1909	133	2	4.18	—	5	4	1	308	20	0	3.90	—
1987–88	Saskatoon Blades	WHL	66	44	19	3	3798	235	1	3.71	—	6	4	2	364	27	0	4.45	—
1988–89	Detroit Red Wings	NHL	2	0	2	0	122	9	0	4.43	.878	—	—	—	—	—	—	—	—
1988–89	Adirondack Red Wings	AHL	30	20	8	0	1694	98	1	3.47	.888	2	1	0	99	9	0	5.45	—
1989–90	Adirondack Red Wings	AHL	31	17	8	6	1848	116	0	3.37	.880	—	—	—	—	—	—	—	—
1989–90	Detroit Red Wings	NHL	28	10	9	8	1600	101	0	3.79	.882	—	—	—	—	—	—	—	—
1990–91	Detroit Red Wings	NHL	65	30	26	5	3615	214	2	3.55	.875	7	3	4	398	22	0	3.32	.894
1991–92	Detroit Red Wings	NHL	72	38	23	9	4236	226	2	3.20	.886	11	3	7	597	25	2	2.51	.910
1992–93	Detroit Red Wings	NHL	67	34	24	7	3880	210	4	3.25	.889	7	3	4	423	24	0	3.40	.880
1993–94	Detroit Red Wings	NHL	30	16	9	1	1572	91	1	3.47	.875	—	—	—	—	—	—	—	—
1993–94	Adirondack Red Wings	AHL	2	1	0	1	125	7	0	3.36	.901	—	—	—	—	—	—	—	—
1993–94	Winnipeg Jets	NHL	14	5	8	1	788	52	1	3.96	.893	—	—	—	—	—	—	—	—
1994–95	Winnipeg Jets	NHL	30	8	16	3	1571	97	0	3.70	.881	—	—	—	—	—	—	—	—
1995–96	Winnipeg Jets	NHL	30	8	18	3	1694	111	0	3.93	.883	—	—	—	—	—	—	—	—
1995–96	Hershey Bears	AHL	8	4	3	0	457	31	0	4.07	.877	4	2	2	250	14	0	3.36	.904
1996–97	Fort Wayne Komets	IHL	21	6	9	4	1137	75	0	3.96	.878	—	—	—	—	—	—	—	—
1996–97	Boston Bruins	NHL	2	0	1	0	93	5	0	3.23	.848	—	—	—	—	—	—	—	—
1997–98	Las Vegas Thunder	IHL	38	9	17	5	1942	128	0	3.95	.878	—	—	—	—	—	—	—	—
NHL totals			340	149	136	37	19,171	1116	10	3.49	.883	25	9	15	1418	71	2	3.00	.896

== Awards ==
- WHL East First All-Star Team – 1988

== Retirement ==
Following his playing career, Cheveldae returned to the Saskatoon Blades as an assistant coach for two seasons. Cheveldae was also on the roster for the First Annual Detroit Red Wings Alumni Showdown on February 19, 2005, in Detroit. The Red Wings alumni team lost to the Maple Leafs alumni team 10–9 in a shootout. According to The Hockey News, Cheveldae currently works as a firefighter at the Dundurn military base in Saskatchewan.

In that time he has won 4 consecutive Firehall Annual Pickleball Championships. Additionally he has won the Pickleball Saskatchewan Provincial Tournament - 2025 Doubles 56+ Mixed 4.0 DUPR Gold Medal with partner Marilyn Barrington.
