= 1990–91 Hartford Whalers season =

National Hockey League team season

1990–91 Hartford Whalers
- Division: 4th Adams
- Conference: 9th Wales
- 1990–91 record: 31–38–11
- Home record: 18–16–6
- Road record: 13–22–5
- Goals for: 238
- Goals against: 276

Team information
- General manager: Eddie Johnston
- Coach: Rick Ley
- Captain: Ron Francis (Oct-Dec); Vacant (Dec-Apr)
- Alternate captains: Pat Verbeek; Dean Evason; Kevin Dineen
- Arena: Hartford Civic Center
- Average attendance: 12,404 (79.3%)
- Minor league affiliates: Springfield Indians (AHL); Kansas City Blades (IHL)

Team leaders
- Goals: Pat Verbeek (43)
- Assists: Ron Francis (55)
- Points: Pat Verbeek (82)
- Penalty minutes: Pat Verbeek (246)
- Plus/minus: Ulf Samuelsson (+13)
- Wins: Peter Sidorkiewicz (21)
- Goals against average: Darryl Reaugh (3.15)

The 1990–91 Hartford Whalers season was the franchise's 19th season, 12th in the NHL. The Whalers placed fourth in the Adams Division to qualify for the playoffs. The Whalers were eliminated in the first round by their New England rival Boston Bruins.

== Offseason ==
At the 1990 NHL supplemental draft held on June 15, the Whalers selected Jim Crozier with the 19th selection. Crozier played the 1989–90 season with Cornell University. In 16 games with the Big Red, Crozier posted a 10-3-1 record with a 2.63 GAA.

On June 16, 1990, the Whalers participated at the 1990 NHL entry draft held at BC Place in Vancouver, British Columbia. With the 15th overall selection, the club selected Mark Greig from the Lethbridge Hurricanes of the Western Hockey League. In 65 games with the Hurricanes, Greig scored 55 goals and 135 points in 1989-90. In the second round of the draft, Hartford selected Geoff Sanderson from the Swift Current Broncos of the WHL with the 36th overall selection. Sanderson scored 32 goals and 94 points in 70 games with the Broncos during the 1989-90 season. Some other notable players selected by Hartford include Mike Lenarduzzi, Jergus Baca, and Espen Knutsen.

The Whalers and New York Rangers made a trade on July 7, as Hartford acquired Carey Wilson and a third round selection in the 1991 NHL entry draft in exchange for Jody Hull. In 41 games with the Rangers during the 1989-90 season, Wilson scored nine goals and 26 points. Wilson had previously played with the Whalers from 1987 to 1989, where in 70 games, he scored 29 goals and 60 points.

On July 16, the Whalers signed free agent John Stevens to a contract. Stevens spent the 1989-90 season with the Hershey Bears of the American Hockey League, where he scored three goals, 13 points, and accumulated 193 penalty minutes in 79 games. Stevens had previous NHL experience, as he appeared in nine games with the Philadelphia Flyers from 1986 to 1988.

On September 30, the club signed free agent Paul Cyr from the New York Rangers. Cyr missed the entire 1989-90 due to injuries, and played in only one game during the 1988-89 season. In his last healthy season in 1987-88, split between the Buffalo Sabres and the Rangers, Cyr scored five goals and 19 points in 60 games. Also on this day, the Whalers acquired a sixth round draft pick at the 1992 NHL entry draft from the Washington Capitals in exchange for Dave Tippett.

Four days later, on October 3, the Whalers made a second trade with the Washington Capitals, as Hartford acquired cash considerations from Washington in exchange for Joel Quenneville.

== Regular season ==
The Whalers had the most power-play opportunities during the regular season, with 403.

=== Final standings ===
Adams Division
	GP	W	L	T	GF	GA	Pts
**Boston Bruins**	80	44	24	12	299	264	100
**Montreal Canadiens**	80	39	30	11	273	249	89
**Buffalo Sabres**	80	31	30	19	292	278	81
**Hartford Whalers**	80	31	38	11	238	276	73
Quebec Nordiques	80	16	50	14	236	354	46

Note: GP = Games played, W = Wins, L = Losses, T = Ties, Pts = Points, GF = Goals for, GA = Goals against
Note: Teams that qualified for the playoffs are highlighted in bold.

Wales Conference
R		Div	GP	W	L	T	GF	GA	Pts
**1**	**Boston Bruins**	**ADM**	**80**	**44**	**24**	**12**	**299**	**264**	**100**
**2**	**Montreal Canadiens**	**ADM**	**80**	**39**	**30**	**11**	**273**	**249**	**89**
**3**	**Pittsburgh Penguins**	**PTK**	**80**	**41**	**33**	**6**	**342**	**305**	**88**
**4**	**New York Rangers**	**PTK**	**80**	**36**	**31**	**13**	**297**	**265**	**85**
**5**	**Washington Capitals**	**PTK**	**80**	**37**	**36**	**7**	**258**	**258**	**81**
**6**	**Buffalo Sabres**	**ADM**	**80**	**31**	**30**	**19**	**292**	**278**	**81**
**7**	**New Jersey Devils**	**PTK**	**80**	**32**	**33**	**15**	**272**	**264**	**79**
8	Philadelphia Flyers	PTK	80	33	37	10	252	267	76
**9**	**Hartford Whalers**	**ADM**	**80**	**31**	**38**	**11**	**238**	**276**	**73**
10	New York Islanders	PTK	80	25	45	10	223	290	60
11	Quebec Nordiques	ADM	80	16	50	14	236	354	46

Divisions: PTK – Patrick, ADM – Adams

bold – Qualified for playoffs

== Schedule and results ==
1990–91 regular season
October

Game	Result	Date	Score	Opponent	Record
1	T	October 4, 1990	3–3 OT	Quebec Nordiques (1990–91)	0–0–1
2	W	October 6, 1990	5–4	New York Rangers (1990–91)	1–0–1
3	L	October 8, 1990	3–5	@ Montreal Canadiens (1990–91)	1–1–1
4	W	October 10, 1990	4–3	Buffalo Sabres (1990–91)	2–1–1
5	L	October 12, 1990	2–4	@ Detroit Red Wings (1990–91)	2–2–1
6	W	October 13, 1990	5–2	Montreal Canadiens (1990–91)	3–2–1
7	T	October 16, 1990	1–1 OT	@ Quebec Nordiques (1990–91)	3–2–2
8	W	October 17, 1990	3–1	@ Toronto Maple Leafs (1990–91)	4–2–2
9	L	October 19, 1990	2–5	@ Los Angeles Kings (1990–91)	4–3–2
10	L	October 24, 1990	0–3	@ Minnesota North Stars (1990–91)	4–4–2
11	L	October 27, 1990	2–4	Vancouver Canucks (1990–91)	4–5–2
12	L	October 28, 1990	0–5	@ Buffalo Sabres (1990–91)	4–6–2
13	L	October 31, 1990	2–4	Montreal Canadiens (1990–91)	4–7–2

November

Game	Result	Date	Score	Opponent	Record
14	L	November 3, 1990	1–4	St. Louis Blues (1990–91)	4–8–2
15	T	November 6, 1990	1–1 OT	Chicago Blackhawks (1990–91)	4–8–3
16	L	November 9, 1990	4–5	@ Winnipeg Jets (1990–91)	4–9–3
17	W	November 10, 1990	3–2 OT	@ Minnesota North Stars (1990–91)	5–9–3
18	W	November 14, 1990	3–1	Boston Bruins (1990–91)	6–9–3
19	W	November 15, 1990	4–2	@ New Jersey Devils (1990–91)	7–9–3
20	W	November 17, 1990	4–2	Washington Capitals (1990–91)	8–9–3
21	T	November 21, 1990	4–4 OT	Quebec Nordiques (1990–91)	8–9–4
22	W	November 23, 1990	4–3	@ Boston Bruins (1990–91)	9–9–4
23	L	November 24, 1990	3–4	Boston Bruins (1990–91)	9–10–4
24	L	November 28, 1990	3–4	Quebec Nordiques (1990–91)	9–11–4
25	W	November 29, 1990	6–4	@ Pittsburgh Penguins (1990–91)	10–11–4

December

Game	Result	Date	Score	Opponent	Record
26	L	December 1, 1990	2–4	Edmonton Oilers (1990–91)	10–12–4
27	W	December 3, 1990	4–2	@ Montreal Canadiens (1990–91)	11–12–4
28	L	December 5, 1990	3–4	Montreal Canadiens (1990–91)	11–13–4
29	W	December 7, 1990	4–3 OT	@ Buffalo Sabres (1990–91)	12–13–4
30	W	December 8, 1990	3–1	Pittsburgh Penguins (1990–91)	13–13–4
31	L	December 12, 1990	1–5	Boston Bruins (1990–91)	13–14–4
32	L	December 13, 1990	2–8	@ Boston Bruins (1990–91)	13–15–4
33	W	December 15, 1990	3–2	@ Washington Capitals (1990–91)	14–15–4
34	L	December 18, 1990	3–4 OT	Buffalo Sabres (1990–91)	14–16–4
35	L	December 20, 1990	2–4	@ New York Islanders (1990–91)	14–17–4
36	W	December 22, 1990	1–0	Philadelphia Flyers (1990–91)	15–17–4
37	L	December 23, 1990	2–5	Minnesota North Stars (1990–91)	15–18–4
38	W	December 26, 1990	4–1	@ Quebec Nordiques (1990–91)	16–18–4
39	L	December 29, 1990	2–8	@ Calgary Flames (1990–91)	16–19–4
40	L	December 30, 1990	3–4	@ Edmonton Oilers (1990–91)	16–20–4

January

Game	Result	Date	Score	Opponent	Record
41	W	January 2, 1991	5–2	Vancouver Canucks (1990–91)	17–20–4
42	W	January 5, 1991	4–3	Winnipeg Jets (1990–91)	18–20–4
43	L	January 8, 1991	3–4 OT	@ Los Angeles Kings (1990–91)	18–21–4
44	W	January 10, 1991	5–4	@ Vancouver Canucks (1990–91)	19–21–4
45	T	January 12, 1991	2–2 OT	@ Toronto Maple Leafs (1990–91)	19–21–5
46	L	January 13, 1991	3–4	@ New York Rangers (1990–91)	19–22–5
47	W	January 16, 1991	4–3	Los Angeles Kings (1990–91)	20–22–5
48	W	January 23, 1991	5–4	Calgary Flames (1990–91)	21–22–5
49	L	January 24, 1991	0–3	@ Boston Bruins (1990–91)	21–23–5
50	W	January 26, 1991	5–3	Philadelphia Flyers (1990–91)	22–23–5
51	L	January 29, 1991	1–8	New York Islanders (1990–91)	22–24–5
52	L	January 31, 1991	3–4 OT	@ St. Louis Blues (1990–91)	22–25–5

February

Game	Result	Date	Score	Opponent	Record
53	W	February 2, 1991	2–0	@ Philadelphia Flyers (1990–91)	23–25–5
54	T	February 3, 1991	1–1 OT	@ New York Islanders (1990–91)	23–25–6
55	W	February 6, 1991	5–1	Edmonton Oilers (1990–91)	24–25–6
56	L	February 9, 1991	2–5	Calgary Flames (1990–91)	24–26–6
57	W	February 10, 1991	3–1	Chicago Blackhawks (1990–91)	25–26–6
58	W	February 13, 1991	6–2	Detroit Red Wings (1990–91)	26–26–6
59	L	February 15, 1991	3–5	@ New York Rangers (1990–91)	26–27–6
60	W	February 16, 1991	2–1	@ Montreal Canadiens (1990–91)	27–27–6
61	W	February 20, 1991	5–3	Montreal Canadiens (1990–91)	28–27–6
62	L	February 23, 1991	4–5	Buffalo Sabres (1990–91)	28–28–6
63	T	February 24, 1991	5–5 OT	@ Buffalo Sabres (1990–91)	28–28–7
64	L	February 26, 1991	4–5	@ Winnipeg Jets (1990–91)	28–29–7
65	L	February 28, 1991	3–6	@ Chicago Blackhawks (1990–91)	28–30–7

March

Game	Result	Date	Score	Opponent	Record
66	T	March 2, 1991	3–3 OT	@ Quebec Nordiques (1990–91)	28–30–8
67	T	March 3, 1991	4–4 OT	Toronto Maple Leafs (1990–91)	28–30–9
68	L	March 5, 1991	1–4	St. Louis Blues (1990–91)	28–31–9
69	L	March 9, 1991	2–5	Pittsburgh Penguins (1990–91)	28–32–9
70	L	March 10, 1991	1–2	Quebec Nordiques (1990–91)	28–33–9
71	W	March 12, 1991	3–2	@ Washington Capitals (1990–91)	29–33–9
72	W	March 14, 1991	4–2	Detroit Red Wings (1990–91)	30–33–9
73	W	March 16, 1991	6–2	New Jersey Devils (1990–91)	31–33–9
74	L	March 17, 1991	1–6	@ Buffalo Sabres (1990–91)	31–34–9
75	T	March 19, 1991	1–1 OT	Boston Bruins (1990–91)	31–34–10
76	L	March 23, 1991	3–7	@ Quebec Nordiques (1990–91)	31–35–10
77	L	March 25, 1991	2–3 OT	@ Montreal Canadiens (1990–91)	31–36–10
78	L	March 27, 1991	3–4 OT	@ New Jersey Devils (1990–91)	31–37–10
79	T	March 30, 1991	5–5 OT	Buffalo Sabres (1990–91)	31–37–11
80	L	March 31, 1991	3–7	@ Boston Bruins (1990–91)	31–38–11

Legend: Win (2 points) Loss (0 points) Tie (1 point)

== Playoffs ==
=== Bruins 4, Whalers 2 ===
==== Adams Division Semi-finals ====
===== (1) Boston Bruins vs. (4) Hartford Whalers =====
April 3	Hartford Whalers	5 – 2	Boston Bruins	Boston Garden	Recap
Verbeek (1) - pp - (Zalapski, Cullen) - 14:11		First period	0:23 - Lazaro (1) - (Bourque, Poulin)
Dineen (1) - (Evason, Ladouceur) - 2:18; Brown (1) - pp - (Verbeek, Cullen) - 9:37		Second period	14:45 - pp - Skriko (1) - (Bourque, Wesley)
Cullen (1) - (Shaw) - 15:49; Cyr (1) - (Evason, Ladouceur) - 16:17		Third period	No scoring
Sidorkiewicz (1-0) (26 saves / 28 shots)		Goalie stats	Moog (0-1) (19 saves / 24 shots)

April 5	Hartford Whalers	3 – 4	Boston Bruins	Boston Garden	Recap
Hunter (1) - (Ladouceur) - 5:08; Verbeek (2) - pp - (Zalapski) - 18:55		First period	0:13 - Skriko (2) - (Wesley, Hodge)
Ladouceur (1) - (Côté, Evason) - 18:12		Second period	9:22 - pp - Neely (1) - (Bourque, Hodge)
No scoring		Third period	11:39 - Neely (2) - (Janney); 16:38 - Neely (3) - (Janney, Carpenter)
Sidorkiewicz (1-1) (36 saves / 40 shots)		Goalie stats	Moog (1-1) (24 saves / 27 shots)

April 7	Boston Bruins	6 – 3	Hartford Whalers	Hartford Civic Center	Recap
Bourque (1) - pp - (Hodge, Janney) - 11:07		First period	No scoring
Wesley (1) - pp - (Bourque, Janney) - 10:38		Second period	6:19 - pp - Hunter (2) - (Cullen, Verbeek)
Galley (1) - (Unassisted) - 6:49; Christian (1) - (Burridge, Wiemer) - 7:07; B. Sweeney (1) - (Nilan) - 10:05; Janney (1) - pp - (Wesley, Neely) - 14:08		Third period	1:59 - Verbeek (3) - (Cullen, Shaw); 15:21 - sh - Yake (1) - (Krygier, Ladouceur)
Moog (2-1) (22 saves / 25 shots)		Goalie stats	Sidorkiewicz (1-2) (17 saves / 23 shots)

April 9	Boston Bruins	3 – 4	Hartford Whalers	Hartford Civic Center	Recap
Christian (2) - (Poulin, Quintal) - 15:30; Skriko (3) - pp - (Bourque, Wesley) - 16:57		First period	2:40 - Cullen (2) - (Sidorkiewicz); 3:39 - pp - Hunter (3) - (Cullen, Zalapski); 12:15 - pp - Hunter (4) - (Côté, Cullen); 15:55 - Zalapski (1) - (Krygier, Yake)
No scoring		Second period	No scoring
Hodge (1) - (Neely, Skriko) - 14:28		Third period	No scoring
Moog (2-2) (30 saves / 34 shots)		Goalie stats	Sidorkiewicz (2-2) (32 saves / 35 shots)

April 11	Hartford Whalers	1 – 6	Boston Bruins	Boston Garden	Recap
No scoring		First period	No scoring
Shaw (1) - (Cullen, Hunter) - 7:16		Second period	No scoring
No scoring		Third period	1:20 - pp - Bourque (2) - (Unassisted); 1:36 - Christian (3) - (Poulin); 8:05 - Lazaro (2) - (Neely, Janney); 10:20 - pp - Neely (4) - (Janney, Bourque); 16:57 - pp - Neely (5) - (Janney, Skriko); 17:53 - pp - Wiemer (1) - (Galley)
Sidorkiewicz (2-3) (26 saves / 32 shots)		Goalie stats	Moog (3-2) (25 saves / 26 shots)

April 13	Boston Bruins	3 – 1	Hartford Whalers	Hartford Civic Center	Recap
Markwart (1) - (Nilan, Poulin) - 3:17; B. Sweeney (2) - (Hodge, Růžička) - 8:50		First period	No scoring
Christian (4) - (Růžička, Galley) - 2:34		Second period	No scoring
No scoring		Third period	13:01 - Hunter (5) - (Evason)
Moog (4-2) (31 saves / 32 shots)		Goalie stats	Sidorkiewicz (2-4) (13 saves / 16 shots)

Boston wins series 4 – 2

== Player statistics ==
=== Regular season ===
Scoring

Player	Pos	GP	G	A	Pts	PIM	+/-	PPG	SHG	GWG
Pat Verbeek	RW	80	43	39	82	246	0	15	0	5
Ron Francis	C	67	21	55	76	51	-2	10	1	6
Kevin Dineen	RW	61	17	30	47	104	-15	4	0	2
Bobby Holik	C	78	21	22	43	113	-3	8	0	3
Rob Brown	RW	44	18	24	42	101	-7	10	0	2
Brad Shaw	D	72	4	28	32	29	-10	2	0	1
Todd Krygier	LW	72	13	17	30	95	1	3	0	2
Dean Evason	C	75	6	23	29	170	-6	1	0	0
Paul Cyr	LW	70	12	13	25	107	-8	0	1	2
Carey Wilson	C	45	8	15	23	16	-14	4	0	1
Doug Crossman	D	41	4	19	23	19	-13	2	0	0
Ulf Samuelsson	D	62	3	18	21	174	13	0	0	0
Sylvain Cote	D	73	7	12	19	17	-17	1	0	0
John Cullen	C	13	8	8	16	18	-6	4	0	1
Mike Tomlak	C/LW	64	8	8	16	55	-9	0	1	0
Scott Young	RW	34	6	9	15	8	-9	3	1	2
Randy Cunneyworth	LW	32	9	5	14	49	-6	0	0	1
Mikael Andersson	LW	41	4	7	11	8	0	0	0	0
Adam Burt	D	42	2	7	9	63	-4	1	0	1
Mark Hunter	RW	11	4	3	7	40	3	1	0	0
Jim McKenzie	LW	41	4	3	7	108	-7	0	0	0
Ray Ferraro	C	15	2	5	7	18	-1	1	0	0
Zarley Zalapski	D	11	3	3	6	6	-7	3	0	0
Dave Babych	D	8	0	6	6	4	-4	0	0	0
Grant Jennings	D	44	1	4	5	82	-13	0	0	0
Terry Yake	C	19	1	4	5	10	-3	0	0	1
Ed Kastelic	W	45	2	2	4	211	-7	0	0	0
Chris Govedaris	LW	14	1	3	4	4	-4	0	0	1
Randy Ladouceur	D	67	1	3	4	118	-10	0	0	0
Todd Richards	D	2	0	4	4	2	-4	0	0	0
Peter Sidorkiewicz	G	52	0	4	4	6	0	0	0	0
Doug Houda	D	19	1	2	3	41	-3	0	0	0
Yvon Corriveau	LW	23	1	1	2	18	-8	0	0	0
Chris Tancill	C	9	1	1	2	4	2	0	1	0
Jergus Baca	D	9	0	2	2	14	-3	0	0	0
Michel Picard	LW	5	1	0	1	2	-2	0	0	0
Geoff Sanderson	LW	2	1	0	1	0	-2	0	0	0
John Stevens	D	14	0	1	1	11	0	0	0	0
Kay Whitmore	G	18	0	1	1	4	0	0	0	0
Marc Bergevin	D	4	0	0	0	4	-3	0	0	0
James Black	LW	1	0	0	0	0	0	0	0	0
Brian Chapman	D	3	0	0	0	29	0	0	0	0
Mark Greig	RW	4	0	0	0	0	-1	0	0	0
Ross McKay	G	1	0	0	0	0	0	0	0	0
Jeff Parker	RW	4	0	0	0	2	-2	0	0	0
Daryl Reaugh	G	20	0	0	0	4	0	0	0	0

Goaltending

Player	MIN	GP	W	L	T	GA	GAA	SO	SA	SV	SV%
Peter Sidorkiewicz	2953	52	21	22	7	164	3.33	1	1284	1120	.872
Daryl Reaugh	1010	20	7	7	1	53	3.15	1	479	426	.889
Kay Whitmore	850	18	3	9	3	52	3.67	0	379	327	.863
Ross McKay	35	1	0	0	0	3	5.14	0	15	12	.800
Team:	4848	80	31	38	11	272	3.37	2	2157	1885	.874

=== Playoffs ===
Scoring

Player	Pos	GP	G	A	Pts	PIM	PPG	SHG	GWG
John Cullen	C	6	2	7	9	10	0	0	0
Mark Hunter	RW	6	5	1	6	17	3	0	0
Pat Verbeek	RW	6	3	2	5	40	2	0	0
Randy Ladouceur	D	6	1	4	5	6	0	0	0
Zarley Zalapski	D	6	1	3	4	8	0	0	1
Dean Evason	C	6	0	4	4	29	0	0	0
Brad Shaw	D	6	1	2	3	2	0	0	0
Terry Yake	C	6	1	1	2	16	0	1	0
Sylvain Cote	D	6	0	2	2	2	0	0	0
Todd Krygier	LW	6	0	2	2	0	0	0	0
Rob Brown	RW	5	1	0	1	7	1	0	1
Paul Cyr	LW	6	1	0	1	10	0	0	0
Kevin Dineen	RW	6	1	0	1	16	0	0	0
Peter Sidorkiewicz	G	6	0	1	1	2	0	0	0
Randy Cunneyworth	LW	1	0	0	0	0	0	0	0
Bobby Holik	C	6	0	0	0	7	0	0	0
Doug Houda	D	6	0	0	0	8	0	0	0
Jim McKenzie	LW	6	0	0	0	8	0	0	0
Todd Richards	D	6	0	0	0	2	0	0	0
Geoff Sanderson	LW	3	0	0	0	0	0	0	0
Mike Tomlak	C/LW	3	0	0	0	2	0	0	0

Goaltending

Player	MIN	GP	W	L	GA	GAA	SO	SA	SV	SV%
Peter Sidorkiewicz	359	6	2	4	24	4.01	0	174	150	.862
Team:	359	6	2	4	24	4.01	0	174	150	.862

Note: GP = Games played; G = Goals; A = Assists; Pts = Points; +/- = Plus-minus PIM = Penalty minutes; PPG = Power-play goals; SHG = Short-handed goals; GWG = Game-winning goals;
MIN = Minutes played; W = Wins; L = Losses; T = Ties; GA = Goals against; GAA = Goals-against average; SO = Shutouts; SA=Shots against; SV=Shots saved; SV% = Save percentage;

== Transactions ==
The Whalers were involved in the following transactions during the 1990–91 season.

=== Trades ===
July 7, 1990	To New York Rangers Jody Hull	To Hartford Whalers Carey Wilson; 3rd round pick in 1991 - Michael Nylander
September 30, 1990	To Washington Capitals Dave Tippett	To Hartford Whalers 6th round pick in 1992 - Jarrett Reid
October 3, 1990	To Washington Capitals Joel Quenneville	To Hartford Whalers Cash
October 11, 1990	To Montreal Canadiens Cash	To Hartford Whalers Todd Richards
October 30, 1990	To New York Islanders 5th round pick in 1992 - Ryan Duthie	To Hartford Whalers Marc Bergevin
November 13, 1990	To New York Islanders Ray Ferraro	To Hartford Whalers Doug Crossman
December 21, 1990	To Pittsburgh Penguins Scott Young	To Hartford Whalers Rob Brown
February 20, 1991	To Detroit Red Wings Doug Crossman	To Hartford Whalers Doug Houda
March 4, 1991	To Pittsburgh Penguins Ron Francis; Ulf Samuelsson; Grant Jennings	To Hartford Whalers John Cullen; Zarley Zalapski; Jeff Parker
March 5, 1991	To Calgary Flames Carey Wilson	To Hartford Whalers Mark Hunter

=== Free agents ===
Player	Former team
John Stevens	Philadelphia Flyers
Paul Cyr	New York Rangers

== Draft picks ==
Hartford's draft picks at the 1990 NHL entry draft held at the BC Place in Vancouver, British Columbia.

Round	#	Player	Nationality	College/Junior/Club team (League)
1	15	Mark Greig	Canada	Lethbridge Hurricanes (WHL)
2	36	Geoff Sanderson	Canada	Swift Current Broncos (WHL)
3	57	Mike Lenarduzzi	Canada	Sault Ste. Marie Greyhounds (OHL)
4	78	Chris Bright	Canada	Moose Jaw Warriors (WHL)
6	120	Cory Keenan	Canada	Kitchener Rangers (OHL)
7	141	Jergus Baca	Czechoslovakia	VSZ Košice (Czechoslovakia)
8	162	Martin D'Orsonnens	Canada	Clarkson University (ECAC)
9	183	Corey Osmark	Canada	Nipawin Hawks (SJHL)
10	204	Espen Knutsen	Norway	Vålerenga IF (Norway)
11	225	Tommie Eriksen	Norway	Prince Albert Raiders (WHL)
12	246	Denis Chalifoux	Canada	Laval Titan (QMJHL)
S	20	Jim Crozier	United States	Cornell University (ECAC)

== See also ==
- 1990–91 NHL season
