= 1990–91 St. Louis Blues season =

National Hockey League team season

1990–91 St. Louis Blues
- Division: 2nd Norris
- Conference: 2nd Campbell
- 1990–91 record: 47–22–11
- Home record: 24–9–7
- Road record: 23–13–4
- Goals for: 310
- Goals against: 250

Team information
- General manager: Ron Caron
- Coach: Brian Sutter
- Captain: Scott Stevens
- Alternate captains: Rick Meagher; Adam Oates
- Arena: St. Louis Arena

Team leaders
- Goals: Brett Hull (86)
- Assists: Adam Oates (90)
- Points: Brett Hull (131)
- Penalty minutes: Glen Featherstone (204)
- Wins: Vincent Riendeau (29)
- Goals against average: Vincent Riendeau (3.01)

The 1990–91 St. Louis Blues season was one in which Brett Hull scored 50 goals in 50 games. Hull finished with 86, the third-highest total in National Hockey League history. After finishing the regular season with the NHL's second highest point total (105), the Blues overcame a 3-games-to-1 series deficit against the Detroit Red Wings in the Norris Division semi-finals before losing to the Minnesota North Stars in the Norris Division Final.

== Offseason ==
Newly acquired defenceman Scott Stevens is named team captain, replacing Rick Meagher.

=== NHL draft ===
St. Louis's draft picks at the 1990 NHL entry draft held at the BC Place in Vancouver, British Columbia.

Round	#	Player	Nationality	College/Junior/Club team (League)
2	33	Craig Johnson	United States	Hill-Murray School (USHS-MN)
3	54	Patrice Tardif	Canada	Champlain College Lennoxville (CEGEP)
5	96	Jason Ruff	Canada	Lethbridge Hurricanes (WHL)
6	117	Kurtis Miller	United States	Rochester Mustangs (USHL)
7	138	Wayne Conlan	United States	Trinity-Pawling School (USHS-NY)
9	180	Parris Duffus	United States	Melfort Mustangs (SJHL)
10	201	Steve Widmeyer	Canada	University of Maine (Hockey East)
11	222	Joe Hawley	Canada	Peterborough Petes (OHL)
12	243	Joe Fleming	United States	Xaverian High School (USHS-MA)
S	17	Geoff Sarjeant	Canada	Michigan Technological University (WCHA)

== Regular season ==
The Blues allowed the most short-handed goals in the NHL, with 18.

=== Final standings ===
Norris Division
	GP	W	L	T	GF	GA	Pts
**Chicago Blackhawks**	80	49	23	8	284	211	106
**St. Louis Blues**	80	47	22	11	310	250	105
**Detroit Red Wings**	80	34	38	8	273	298	76
**Minnesota North Stars**	80	27	39	14	256	266	68
Toronto Maple Leafs	80	23	46	11	241	318	57

Note: GP = Games played, W = Wins, L = Losses, T = Ties, Pts = Points, GF = Goals for, GA = Goals against
Note: Teams that qualified for the playoffs are highlighted in bold.

Campbell Conference
R		Div	GP	W	L	T	GF	GA	Pts
**1**	**p – Chicago Blackhawks**	**NRS**	**80**	**49**	**23**	**8**	**284**	**211**	**106**
**2**	**St. Louis Blues**	**NRS**	**80**	**47**	**22**	**11**	**310**	**250**	**105**
**3**	**Los Angeles Kings**	**SMY**	**80**	**46**	**24**	**10**	**340**	**254**	**102**
**4**	**Calgary Flames**	**SMY**	**80**	**46**	**26**	**8**	**344**	**263**	**100**
**5**	**Edmonton Oilers**	**SMY**	**80**	**37**	**37**	**6**	**272**	**272**	**80**
**6**	**Detroit Red Wings**	**NRS**	**80**	**34**	**38**	**8**	**273**	**298**	**76**
**7**	**Minnesota North Stars**	**NRS**	**80**	**27**	**39**	**14**	**256**	**266**	**68**
**8**	**Vancouver Canucks**	**SMY**	**80**	**28**	**43**	**9**	**243**	**315**	**65**
9	Winnipeg Jets	SMY	80	26	43	11	260	288	63
10	Toronto Maple Leafs	NRS	80	23	46	11	241	318	57

Divisions: NRS – Norris, SMY – Smythe

bold – Qualified for playoffs; p – Won Presidents' Trophy

== Schedule and results ==
1990–91 regular season
October

Game	Result	Date	Score	Opponent	Record
1	W	October 4, 1990	3–2	@ Minnesota North Stars (1990–91)	1–0–0
2	L	October 6, 1990	2–5	Chicago Blackhawks (1990–91)	1–1–0
3	W	October 9, 1990	4–3	Pittsburgh Penguins (1990–91)	2–1–0
4	L	October 12, 1990	0–4	@ Vancouver Canucks (1990–91)	2–2–0
5	L	October 14, 1990	1–4	@ Los Angeles Kings (1990–91)	2–3–0
6	W	October 16, 1990	5–2	@ Edmonton Oilers (1990–91)	3–3–0
7	W	October 18, 1990	4–3	@ Calgary Flames (1990–91)	4–3–0
8	T	October 20, 1990	2–2 OT	Minnesota North Stars (1990–91)	4–3–1
9	W	October 24, 1990	8–3	@ Toronto Maple Leafs (1990–91)	5–3–1
10	W	October 25, 1990	8–5	Toronto Maple Leafs (1990–91)	6–3–1
11	W	October 27, 1990	3–0	Montreal Canadiens (1990–91)	7–3–1
12	W	October 30, 1990	5–2	@ Detroit Red Wings (1990–91)	8–3–1

November

Game	Result	Date	Score	Opponent	Record
13	L	November 1, 1990	2–3 OT	@ Boston Bruins (1990–91)	8–4–1
14	W	November 3, 1990	4–1	@ Hartford Whalers (1990–91)	9–4–1
15	W	November 6, 1990	2–1	Edmonton Oilers (1990–91)	10–4–1
16	W	November 8, 1990	3–2	@ Pittsburgh Penguins (1990–91)	11–4–1
17	W	November 10, 1990	6–1	Detroit Red Wings (1990–91)	12–4–1
18	W	November 13, 1990	4–2	Quebec Nordiques (1990–91)	13–4–1
19	W	November 17, 1990	3–2	@ Minnesota North Stars (1990–91)	14–4–1
20	L	November 18, 1990	3–4	@ Winnipeg Jets (1990–91)	14–5–1
21	W	November 20, 1990	4–2	Winnipeg Jets (1990–91)	15–5–1
22	L	November 23, 1990	3–5	@ Detroit Red Wings (1990–91)	15–6–1
23	T	November 24, 1990	3–3 OT	Vancouver Canucks (1990–91)	15–6–2
24	L	November 27, 1990	3–4 OT	Toronto Maple Leafs (1990–91)	15–7–2
25	T	November 29, 1990	4–4 OT	Los Angeles Kings (1990–91)	15–7–3

December

Game	Result	Date	Score	Opponent	Record
26	L	December 1, 1990	1–4	New Jersey Devils (1990–91)	15–8–3
27	L	December 2, 1990	2–3	@ Chicago Blackhawks (1990–91)	15–9–3
28	W	December 7, 1990	6–3	@ Detroit Red Wings (1990–91)	16–9–3
29	W	December 8, 1990	2–1	Detroit Red Wings (1990–91)	17–9–3
30	T	December 11, 1990	3–3 OT	Winnipeg Jets (1990–91)	17–9–4
31	W	December 13, 1990	4–2	Minnesota North Stars (1990–91)	18–9–4
32	W	December 15, 1990	4–2	@ Toronto Maple Leafs (1990–91)	19–9–4
33	W	December 16, 1990	5–3	@ Buffalo Sabres (1990–91)	20–9–4
34	T	December 20, 1990	3–3 OT	Washington Capitals (1990–91)	20–9–5
35	W	December 22, 1990	5–0	Chicago Blackhawks (1990–91)	21–9–5
36	T	December 26, 1990	6–6 OT	@ Chicago Blackhawks (1990–91)	21–9–6
37	L	December 27, 1990	4–6	@ Toronto Maple Leafs (1990–91)	21–10–6
38	L	December 29, 1990	1–3	Philadelphia Flyers (1990–91)	21–11–6
39	L	December 31, 1990	3–4	@ Pittsburgh Penguins (1990–91)	21–12–6

January

Game	Result	Date	Score	Opponent	Record
40	W	January 3, 1991	8–7	Quebec Nordiques (1990–91)	22–12–6
41	L	January 5, 1991	2–3 OT	New York Rangers (1990–91)	22–13–6
42	W	January 8, 1991	5–3	@ New Jersey Devils (1990–91)	23–13–6
43	W	January 9, 1991	3–2	@ New York Rangers (1990–91)	24–13–6
44	T	January 12, 1991	4–4 OT	@ Quebec Nordiques (1990–91)	24–13–7
45	W	January 13, 1991	3–1	@ Montreal Canadiens (1990–91)	25–13–7
46	W	January 15, 1991	7–3	Washington Capitals (1990–91)	26–13–7
47	L	January 17, 1991	2–4	Montreal Canadiens (1990–91)	26–14–7
48	L	January 22, 1991	3–7	@ Minnesota North Stars (1990–91)	26–15–7
49	W	January 25, 1991	9–4	@ Detroit Red Wings (1990–91)	27–15–7
50	W	January 26, 1991	5–4 OT	Detroit Red Wings (1990–91)	28–15–7
51	W	January 29, 1991	8–3	Buffalo Sabres (1990–91)	29–15–7
52	W	January 31, 1991	4–3 OT	Hartford Whalers (1990–91)	30–15–7

February

Game	Result	Date	Score	Opponent	Record
53	W	February 2, 1991	5–4	New Jersey Devils (1990–91)	31–15–7
54	L	February 4, 1991	5–6 OT	@ Toronto Maple Leafs (1990–91)	31–16–7
55	W	February 6, 1991	5–4 OT	@ Buffalo Sabres (1990–91)	32–16–7
56	W	February 9, 1991	5–4	Los Angeles Kings (1990–91)	33–16–7
57	W	February 12, 1991	4–2	@ Edmonton Oilers (1990–91)	34–16–7
58	W	February 14, 1991	3–2	@ Vancouver Canucks (1990–91)	35–16–7
59	L	February 17, 1991	4–7	@ Calgary Flames (1990–91)	35–17–7
60	W	February 19, 1991	3–2	Toronto Maple Leafs (1990–91)	36–17–7
61	W	February 21, 1991	7–2	New York Islanders (1990–91)	37–17–7
62	W	February 23, 1991	9–2	Boston Bruins (1990–91)	38–17–7
63	L	February 24, 1991	2–6	@ Chicago Blackhawks (1990–91)	38–18–7
64	W	February 26, 1991	3–1	Chicago Blackhawks (1990–91)	39–18–7
65	T	February 28, 1991	4–4 OT	New York Rangers (1990–91)	39–18–8

March

Game	Result	Date	Score	Opponent	Record
66	T	March 2, 1991	4–4 OT	@ Philadelphia Flyers (1990–91)	39–18–9
67	W	March 5, 1991	4–1	@ Hartford Whalers (1990–91)	40–18–9
68	T	March 7, 1991	5–5 OT	@ Boston Bruins (1990–91)	40–18–10
69	L	March 9, 1991	4–8	Calgary Flames (1990–91)	40–19–10
70	L	March 10, 1991	1–4	Detroit Red Wings (1990–91)	40–20–10
71	T	March 14, 1991	2–2 OT	Minnesota North Stars (1990–91)	40–20–11
72	L	March 16, 1991	2–3	Chicago Blackhawks (1990–91)	40–21–11
73	L	March 17, 1991	4–6	@ Chicago Blackhawks (1990–91)	40–22–11
74	W	March 19, 1991	2–1	@ Washington Capitals (1990–91)	41–22–11
75	W	March 21, 1991	4–1	@ Philadelphia Flyers (1990–91)	42–22–11
76	W	March 23, 1991	3–2	@ New York Islanders (1990–91)	43–22–11
77	W	March 25, 1991	5–4	@ Minnesota North Stars (1990–91)	44–22–11
78	W	March 28, 1991	3–0	New York Islanders (1990–91)	45–22–11
79	W	March 30, 1991	5–2	Toronto Maple Leafs (1990–91)	46–22–11
80	W	March 31, 1991	2–1	Minnesota North Stars (1990–91)	47–22–11

Legend: Win (2 points) Loss (0 points) Tie (1 point)

== Player statistics ==
=== Regular season ===
Scoring

Player	Pos	GP	G	A	Pts	PIM	+/-	PPG	SHG	GWG
Brett Hull	RW	78	86	45	131	22	23	29	0	11
Adam Oates	C	61	25	90	115	29	15	3	1	3
Jeff Brown	D	67	12	47	59	39	4	6	1	0
Geoff Courtnall	LW	66	27	30	57	56	19	9	0	6
Rod Brind'Amour	C	78	17	32	49	93	2	4	0	3
Scott Stevens	D	78	5	44	49	150	23	1	0	1
Dave Lowry	LW	79	19	21	40	168	19	0	2	5
Ron Wilson	C	73	10	27	37	54	-1	1	2	1
Paul Cavallini	D	67	10	25	35	89	19	3	0	0
Gino Cavallini	LW	78	8	27	35	81	4	3	0	2
Bob Bassen	C	79	16	18	34	183	17	0	2	1
Cliff Ronning	C	48	14	18	32	10	2	5	0	2
Sergio Momesso	LW	59	10	18	28	131	12	0	0	1
Rich Sutter	RW	77	16	11	27	122	6	0	2	2
Glen Featherstone	D	68	5	15	20	204	19	1	0	1
Paul MacLean	RW	37	6	11	17	24	-2	0	0	2
Mario Marois	D	64	2	14	16	81	17	0	0	0
Dan Quinn	C	14	4	7	11	20	-5	4	0	2
Steve Tuttle	RW	20	3	6	9	2	2	0	0	0
Herb Raglan	RW	32	3	3	6	52	4	0	0	1
Tom Tilley	D	22	2	4	6	4	5	0	0	0
Harold Snepsts	D	54	1	4	5	50	3	0	0	1
Rick Meagher	C	24	3	1	4	6	0	0	0	0
Robert Dirk	D	41	1	3	4	100	2	0	0	0
Garth Butcher	D	13	0	4	4	32	4	0	0	0
David Bruce	LW	12	1	2	3	14	1	0	0	0
Dominic Lavoie	D	6	1	2	3	2	4	0	0	0
Nelson Emerson	RW	4	0	3	3	2	-2	0	0	0
Darin Kimble	RW	26	1	1	2	128	2	0	0	1
Michel Mongeau	C	7	1	1	2	0	1	1	0	0
Vincent Riendeau	G	44	0	2	2	0	0	0	0	0
Kelly Chase	RW	2	1	0	1	15	1	0	0	1
Pat Jablonski	G	8	0	1	1	0	0	0	0	0
Curtis Joseph	G	30	0	1	1	0	0	0	0	0
Gordie Roberts	D	3	0	1	1	8	-1	0	0	0
Dave Thomlinson	LW	3	0	0	0	0	-3	0	0	0

Goaltending

Player	MIN	GP	W	L	T	GA	GAA	SO	SA	SV	SV%
Vincent Riendeau	2671	44	29	9	6	134	3.01	3	1241	1107	.892
Curtis Joseph	1710	30	16	10	2	89	3.12	0	874	785	.898
Pat Jablonski	492	8	2	3	3	25	3.05	0	228	203	.890
Team:	4873	80	47	22	11	248	3.05	3	2343	2095	.894

=== Playoffs ===
Scoring

Player	Pos	GP	G	A	Pts	PIM	+/-	PPG	SHG	GWG
Adam Oates	C	13	7	13	20	10	7	2	0	1
Brett Hull	RW	13	11	8	19	4	5	3	0	2
Jeff Brown	D	13	3	9	12	6	6	0	0	0
Dan Quinn	C	13	4	7	11	32	-2	2	0	1
Rod Brind'Amour	C	13	2	5	7	10	0	1	0	0
Rich Sutter	RW	13	4	2	6	16	2	0	0	1
Paul Cavallini	D	13	2	3	5	20	0	1	0	0
Dave Lowry	LW	13	1	4	5	35	-6	0	0	0
Dave Thomlinson	LW	9	3	1	4	4	2	1	0	1
Bob Bassen	C	13	1	3	4	24	1	0	0	0
Gino Cavallini	LW	13	1	3	4	2	2	0	0	0
Garth Butcher	D	13	2	1	3	54	-1	0	0	0
Scott Stevens	D	13	0	3	3	36	8	0	0	0
Steve Tuttle	RW	6	0	3	3	0	-3	0	0	0
Rick Meagher	C	9	0	1	1	2	0	0	0	0
David Bruce	LW	2	0	0	0	2	0	0	0	0
Kelly Chase	RW	6	0	0	0	18	-1	0	0	0
Glen Featherstone	D	9	0	0	0	31	-5	0	0	0
Pat Jablonski	G	3	0	0	0	0	0	0	0	0
Darin Kimble	RW	13	0	0	0	38	0	0	0	0
Mario Marois	D	9	0	0	0	37	0	0	0	0
Vincent Riendeau	G	13	0	0	0	0	0	0	0	0
Harold Snepsts	D	8	0	0	0	12	-1	0	0	0
Ron Wilson	C	7	0	0	0	28	0	0	0	0

Goaltending

Player	MIN	GP	W	L	GA	GAA	SO	SA	SV	SV%
Vincent Riendeau	687	13	6	7	35	3.06	1	294	259	.881
Pat Jablonski	90	3	0	0	5	3.33	0	35	30	.857
Team:	777	13	6	7	40	3.09	1	329	289	.878

Note:

Pos = Position;GP = Games played; G = Goals; A = Assists; Pts = Points; PIM = Penalty minutes; +/- = Plus/minus; PPG = Power-play goals; SHG = Short-handed goals; GWG = Game-winning goals
Pos = Position;GP = Games played; Min, TOI = Minutes played; W = Wins; L = Losses; T,T/OT = Ties; OTL = Overtime losses; GA = Goals-against; GAA = Goals-against average; SO = Shutouts; SA = Shots against; SV = Shots saved;SV% = Save percentage;

== Playoffs ==
=== Norris Division Semi-Finals ===
St. Louis vs. Detroit
Date	Away	Home
April 4	Detroit 6	3 St. Louis
April 6	Detroit 2	4 St. Louis
April 8	St. Louis 2	5 Detroit
April 10	St. Louis 3	4 Detroit
April 12	Detroit 1	6 St. Louis
April 14	St. Louis 3	0 Detroit
April 16	Detroit 2	3 St. Louis
St. Louis wins series 4–3

=== Norris Division Finals ===
St. Louis vs. Minnesota
Date	Away	Home
April 18	Minnesota 2	1 St. Louis
April 20	Minnesota 2	5 St. Louis
April 22	St. Louis 1	5 Minnesota
April 24	St. Louis 4	8 Minnesota
April 26	Minnesota 2	4 St. Louis
April 28	St. Louis 2	3 Minnesota
Minnesota wins series 4–2

== Awards and records ==
- Hart Memorial Trophy: Brett Hull
- Jack Adams Award: Brian Sutter
- Lester B. Pearson Award: Brett Hull
- Brett Hull, NHL Leader in Goals Scored (86)
- Brett Hull, Record of Most Goals by a Right Wing in One Season (86)
- Brett Hull, Right Wing, NHL First All-Star Team
- Adam Oates, Center, NHL Second All-Star Team
