= 1990–91 Chicago Blackhawks season =

National Hockey League team season

1990–91 Chicago Blackhawks
- Presidents' Trophy winners
- Norris Division champions
- Division: 1st Norris
- Conference: 1st Campbell
- 1990–91 record: 49–23–8
- Home record: 28–8–4
- Road record: 21–15–4
- Goals for: 284
- Goals against: 211

Team information
- General manager: Mike Keenan
- Coach: Mike Keenan
- Captain: Dirk Graham
- Alternate captains: Chris Chelios; Steve Larmer
- Arena: Chicago Stadium

Team leaders
- Goals: Steve Larmer (44)
- Assists: Steve Larmer (57)
- Points: Steve Larmer (101)
- Penalty minutes: Mike Peluso (320)
- Wins: Ed Belfour (43)
- Goals against average: Jimmy Waite (2.00)

The 1990–91 Chicago Blackhawks season was the team's 65th season. After making the Conference Finals two years in a row, the Blackhawks hosted the NHL All-Star Game, and finished with 106 points winning the NHL Presidents' Trophy for best record in the league. The Hawks received terrific performances from Steve Larmer, Jeremy Roenick, Chris Chelios, Dirk Graham and rookie Ed Belfour. Hockey, it seemed, was back in Chicago, and dreams of the first Stanley Cup since 1961 were rampant. However the playoffs matched the Blackhawks with their old rivals, the Minnesota North Stars, who defeated the Hawks in the first round of the 1991 Stanley Cup playoffs 4–2.

== Offseason ==
Coach Mike Keenan assumed the role General Manager while remaining coach, and traded fan-favorite Denis Savard to the Montreal Canadiens for Chicago native Chris Chelios in the summer of 1990. Several of the older Blackhawks (Al Secord, Bob Murray and Duane Sutter) retired.

=== NHL draft ===
Round	Pick	Player	Nationality	College/Junior/Club team
1	16	Karl Dykhuis (D)	Canada	Hull Olympiques (QMJHL)
2	37	Ivan Droppa (D)	Czechoslovakia	MHk 32 Liptovsky Mikulas (Czechoslovakia)
4	79	Chris Tucker (C)	United States	Bloomington Jefferson High School (USHS-MN)
6	121	Brett Stickney (C)	United States	St. Paul's School (USHS-NH)
6	124	Derek Edgerly (C)	United States	Stoneham High School (USHS-MA)
8	163	Hugo Belanger (LW)	Canada	Clarkson University (ECAC)
9	184	Owen Lessard (LW)	Canada	Owen Sound Platers (OHL)
10	205	Erik Peterson (C)	United States	Brockton High School (USHS-MA)
11	226	Steve Dubinsky (C)	Canada	Clarkson University (ECAC)
12	247	Dino Grossi (F)	Canada	Northeastern University (Hockey East)
S	21	Claude Maillet (D)	Canada	Merrimack College (Hockey East)

== Regular season ==
The Blackhawks played at a high level all season as they won the Norris Division, the Western Conference regular season, and their first Presidents' Trophy for having the best record in the NHL with a record of 49–23–8 – good for 106 points. The Hawks edged St. Louis for all three titles as the Blues finished second with 105 points on the last day of the season with a win over the Red Wings. In addition to winning the Presidents' Trophy as the NHL's best team during the regular season, the Blackhawks also were the NHL's best defense, having allowed only 211 goals over 80 games. Despite being the most penalized team during the regular season, with 425 short-handed situations, the Blackhawks had a penalty-killing percentage of 84.00%, good enough for second place in the league. The Blackhawks also led the NHL in short-handed goals scored, with 20.

On October 25, 1990, Steve Larmer scored just 8 seconds into the overtime period to give the Blackhawks a 3–2 home win over the Washington Capitals. It would prove to be the fastest overtime goal scored during the 1990-91 NHL regular season.

=== All-Star Game ===

The 42nd National Hockey League All-Star Game took place in Chicago Stadium, home of the Chicago Blackhawks, on January 19, 1991. The game saw the team of Campbell conference all-stars beat the team of Wales conference all-stars 11–5.

While the game was high-scoring and exciting, the real story was the emotions. First from a hockey perspective, Chicago had not hosted an All-Star Game since 1974, and the Blackhawks resurgence was fueled by three All-Stars – Steve Larmer, Jeremy Roenick (his first), and Chris Chelios, all of whom received great ovations from the hometown fans during introductions. The second, larger perspective was that the game was played during the war with Iraq, and Operation Desert Storm had just started two days earlier. Some players asked that the game be delayed, but the league pressed on and players wore decals on their helmets supporting the troops. When Wayne Messmer stepped to the microphone and the organ began to play the pre-game National Anthem, the roar from the Chicago Stadium crowd, many of whom waved flags and sparklers, was deafening and sustained over the length of the song, totally overwhelming the performance, and creating a patriotic moment of history that transcended the sport.

=== Season standings ===
Norris Division
	GP	W	L	T	GF	GA	Pts
**Chicago Blackhawks**	80	49	23	8	284	211	106
**St. Louis Blues**	80	47	22	11	310	250	105
**Detroit Red Wings**	80	34	38	8	273	298	76
**Minnesota North Stars**	80	27	39	14	256	266	68
Toronto Maple Leafs	80	23	46	11	241	318	57

Note: GP = Games played, W = Wins, L = Losses, T = Ties, Pts = Points, GF = Goals for, GA = Goals against
Note: Teams that qualified for the playoffs are highlighted in bold.

Campbell Conference
R		Div	GP	W	L	T	GF	GA	Pts
**1**	**p – Chicago Blackhawks**	**NRS**	**80**	**49**	**23**	**8**	**284**	**211**	**106**
**2**	**St. Louis Blues**	**NRS**	**80**	**47**	**22**	**11**	**310**	**250**	**105**
**3**	**Los Angeles Kings**	**SMY**	**80**	**46**	**24**	**10**	**340**	**254**	**102**
**4**	**Calgary Flames**	**SMY**	**80**	**46**	**26**	**8**	**344**	**263**	**100**
**5**	**Edmonton Oilers**	**SMY**	**80**	**37**	**37**	**6**	**272**	**272**	**80**
**6**	**Detroit Red Wings**	**NRS**	**80**	**34**	**38**	**8**	**273**	**298**	**76**
**7**	**Minnesota North Stars**	**NRS**	**80**	**27**	**39**	**14**	**256**	**266**	**68**
**8**	**Vancouver Canucks**	**SMY**	**80**	**28**	**43**	**9**	**243**	**315**	**65**
9	Winnipeg Jets	SMY	80	26	43	11	260	288	63
10	Toronto Maple Leafs	NRS	80	23	46	11	241	318	57

Divisions: NRS – Norris, SMY – Smythe

bold – Qualified for playoffs; p – Won Presidents' Trophy

== Schedule and results ==
1990–91 regular season
October

Game	Result	Date	Score	Opponent	Record
1	W	October 4, 1990	4–3	New York Rangers (1990–91)	1–0–0
2	W	October 6, 1990	5–2	@ St. Louis Blues (1990–91)	2–0–0
3	L	October 7, 1990	2–4	New York Islanders (1990–91)	2–1–0
4	W	October 11, 1990	4–1	Pittsburgh Penguins (1990–91)	3–1–0
5	W	October 13, 1990	4–1	@ Minnesota North Stars (1990–91)	4–1–0
6	L	October 14, 1990	1–3	Calgary Flames (1990–91)	4–2–0
7	L	October 16, 1990	2–3	@ Detroit Red Wings (1990–91)	4–3–0
8	W	October 18, 1990	3–0	Toronto Maple Leafs (1990–91)	5–3–0
9	L	October 20, 1990	2–6	@ Toronto Maple Leafs (1990–91)	5–4–0
10	W	October 21, 1990	7–1	Minnesota North Stars (1990–91)	6–4–0
11	W	October 25, 1990	3–2 OT	Washington Capitals (1990–91)	7–4–0
12	L	October 27, 1990	4–5	@ Boston Bruins (1990–91)	7–5–0
13	W	October 28, 1990	2–1 OT	Montreal Canadiens (1990–91)	8–5–0

November

Game	Result	Date	Score	Opponent	Record
14	W	November 1, 1990	6–2	Quebec Nordiques (1990–91)	9–5–0
15	W	November 3, 1990	3–1	@ Philadelphia Flyers (1990–91)	10–5–0
16	L	November 4, 1990	0–2	Los Angeles Kings (1990–91)	10–6–0
17	T	November 6, 1990	1–1 OT	@ Hartford Whalers (1990–91)	10–6–1
18	W	November 8, 1990	5–3	Edmonton Oilers (1990–91)	11–6–1
19	W	November 10, 1990	5–1	@ Toronto Maple Leafs (1990–91)	12–6–1
20	T	November 11, 1990	3–3 OT	Winnipeg Jets (1990–91)	12–6–2
21	W	November 14, 1990	3–2	@ Detroit Red Wings (1990–91)	13–6–2
22	W	November 16, 1990	4–3	@ Washington Capitals (1990–91)	14–6–2
23	W	November 17, 1990	7–2	@ Quebec Nordiques (1990–91)	15–6–2
24	W	November 20, 1990	3–1	@ Edmonton Oilers (1990–91)	16–6–2
25	L	November 21, 1990	1–4	@ Vancouver Canucks (1990–91)	16–7–2
26	W	November 24, 1990	5–3	@ Calgary Flames (1990–91)	17–7–2
27	L	November 29, 1990	1–5	Detroit Red Wings (1990–91)	17–8–2

December

Game	Result	Date	Score	Opponent	Record
28	L	December 1, 1990	3–4	@ Detroit Red Wings (1990–91)	17–9–2
29	W	December 2, 1990	3–2	St. Louis Blues (1990–91)	18–9–2
30	W	December 6, 1990	5–2	New York Islanders (1990–91)	19–9–2
31	W	December 8, 1990	2–1	@ Toronto Maple Leafs (1990–91)	20–9–2
32	L	December 9, 1990	4–5	Philadelphia Flyers (1990–91)	20–10–2
33	W	December 11, 1990	4–1	@ Pittsburgh Penguins (1990–91)	21–10–2
34	W	December 13, 1990	5–4	Winnipeg Jets (1990–91)	22–10–2
35	L	December 15, 1990	1–5	@ Minnesota North Stars (1990–91)	22–11–2
36	W	December 16, 1990	5–2	Minnesota North Stars (1990–91)	23–11–2
37	W	December 19, 1990	3–2	Washington Capitals (1990–91)	24–11–2
38	L	December 22, 1990	0–5	@ St. Louis Blues (1990–91)	24–12–2
39	W	December 23, 1990	3–2	Detroit Red Wings (1990–91)	25–12–2
40	T	December 26, 1990	6–6 OT	St. Louis Blues (1990–91)	25–12–3
41	L	December 28, 1990	0–5	@ Buffalo Sabres (1990–91)	25–13–3
42	W	December 29, 1990	3–1	@ New York Islanders (1990–91)	26–13–3
43	W	December 31, 1990	4–0	@ Detroit Red Wings (1990–91)	27–13–3

January

Game	Result	Date	Score	Opponent	Record
44	W	January 3, 1991	5–3	New Jersey Devils (1990–91)	28–13–3
45	L	January 6, 1991	1–3	Los Angeles Kings (1990–91)	28–14–3
46	W	January 10, 1991	7–2	Toronto Maple Leafs (1990–91)	29–14–3
47	W	January 11, 1991	3–1	@ Winnipeg Jets (1990–91)	30–14–3
48	W	January 13, 1991	5–3	Minnesota North Stars (1990–91)	31–14–3
49	T	January 16, 1991	2–2 OT	@ New Jersey Devils (1990–91)	31–14–4
50	W	January 17, 1991	3–2	@ New York Rangers (1990–91)	32–14–4
51	L	January 24, 1991	4–5	Buffalo Sabres (1990–91)	32–15–4
52	W	January 26, 1991	5–1	Toronto Maple Leafs (1990–91)	33–15–4
53	W	January 28, 1991	1–0	@ Vancouver Canucks (1990–91)	34–15–4

February

Game	Result	Date	Score	Opponent	Record
54	L	February 1, 1991	3–4 OT	@ Edmonton Oilers (1990–91)	34–16–4
55	L	February 2, 1991	1–3	@ Calgary Flames (1990–91)	34–17–4
56	W	February 6, 1991	8–3	@ Montreal Canadiens (1990–91)	35–17–4
57	L	February 9, 1991	3–5	@ Boston Bruins (1990–91)	35–18–4
58	L	February 10, 1991	1–3	@ Hartford Whalers (1990–91)	35–19–4
59	W	February 14, 1991	2–1 OT	Quebec Nordiques (1990–91)	36–19–4
60	T	February 17, 1991	3–3 OT	Detroit Red Wings (1990–91)	36–19–5
61	L	February 18, 1991	3–5	@ Philadelphia Flyers (1990–91)	36–20–5
62	W	February 21, 1991	4–1	Boston Bruins (1990–91)	37–20–5
63	T	February 23, 1991	3–3 OT	@ Minnesota North Stars (1990–91)	37–20–6
64	W	February 24, 1991	6–2	St. Louis Blues (1990–91)	38–20–6
65	L	February 26, 1991	1–3	@ St. Louis Blues (1990–91)	38–21–6
66	W	February 28, 1991	6–3	Hartford Whalers (1990–91)	39–21–6

March

Game	Result	Date	Score	Opponent	Record
67	W	March 3, 1991	8–0	Vancouver Canucks (1990–91)	40–21–6
68	L	March 6, 1991	3–5	Montreal Canadiens (1990–91)	40–22–6
69	W	March 8, 1991	5–3	@ Buffalo Sabres (1990–91)	41–22–6
70	W	March 10, 1991	5–2	New York Rangers (1990–91)	42–22–6
71	W	March 14, 1991	6–3	@ Los Angeles Kings (1990–91)	43–22–6
72	W	March 16, 1991	3–2	@ St. Louis Blues (1990–91)	44–22–6
73	W	March 17, 1991	6–4	St. Louis Blues (1990–91)	45–22–6
74	T	March 21, 1991	2–2 OT	New Jersey Devils (1990–91)	45–22–7
75	W	March 23, 1991	7–5	@ Pittsburgh Penguins (1990–91)	46–22–7
76	W	March 24, 1991	5–4	Minnesota North Stars (1990–91)	47–22–7
77	T	March 26, 1991	2–2 OT	@ Toronto Maple Leafs (1990–91)	47–22–8
78	W	March 28, 1991	5–3	Toronto Maple Leafs (1990–91)	48–22–8
79	L	March 30, 1991	1–2	@ Minnesota North Stars (1990–91)	48–23–8
80	W	March 31, 1991	5–1	Detroit Red Wings (1990–91)	49–23–8

Legend: Win (2 points) Loss (0 points) Tie (1 point)

== Player statistics ==
=== Regular season ===
Scoring

Player	Pos	GP	G	A	Pts	PIM	+/-	PPG	SHG	GWG
Steve Larmer	RW	80	44	57	101	79	37	17	2	9
Jeremy Roenick	C	79	41	53	94	80	38	15	4	10
Michel Goulet	LW	74	27	38	65	65	27	9	0	1
Chris Chelios	D	77	12	52	64	192	23	5	2	2
Steve Thomas	LW	69	19	35	54	129	8	2	0	3
Adam Creighton	C	72	22	29	51	135	0	10	2	6
Dirk Graham	W	80	24	21	45	88	12	4	6	7
Doug Wilson	D	51	11	29	40	32	25	6	1	1
Troy Murray	C	75	14	23	37	74	13	4	0	2
Wayne Presley	RW	71	15	19	34	122	11	1	0	3
Dave Manson	D	75	14	15	29	191	20	6	1	2
Greg Gilbert	LW	72	10	15	25	58	6	1	0	0
Mike Hudson	C/LW	55	7	9	16	62	5	0	0	1
Trent Yawney	D	61	3	13	16	77	6	3	0	0
Frantisek Kucera	D	40	2	12	14	32	3	1	0	0
Jocelyn Lemieux	RW	67	6	7	13	119	-7	1	1	2
Steve Konroyd	D	70	0	12	12	40	11	0	0	0
Keith Brown	D	45	1	10	11	55	9	0	0	0
Bob McGill	D	77	4	5	9	151	8	0	0	0
Mike Peluso	LW	53	6	1	7	320	-3	2	0	0
Paul Gillis	C	13	0	5	5	53	1	0	0	0
Mike McNeill	RW	23	2	2	4	6	-1	0	1	0
Brian Noonan	RW	7	0	4	4	2	-1	0	0	0
Ed Belfour	G	74	0	3	3	34	0	0	0	0
Stu Grimson	LW	35	0	1	1	183	-3	0	0	0
Tony McKegney	LW	9	0	1	1	4	-2	0	0	0
Mike Stapleton	C	7	0	1	1	2	0	0	0	0
Jacques Cloutier	G	10	0	0	0	2	0	0	0	0
Dominik Hasek	G	5	0	0	0	0	0	0	0	0
Greg Millen	G	3	0	0	0	0	0	0	0	0
Cam Russell	D	3	0	0	0	5	1	0	0	0
Jimmy Waite	G	1	0	0	0	0	0	0	0	0

Goaltending

Player	MIN	GP	W	L	T	GA	GAA	SO	SA	SV	SV%
Ed Belfour	4127	74	43	19	7	170	2.47	4	1883	1713	.910
Dominik Hasek	195	5	3	0	1	8	2.46	0	93	85	.914
Jacques Cloutier	403	10	2	3	0	24	3.57	0	175	151	.863
Jimmy Waite	60	1	1	0	0	2	2.00	0	28	26	.929
Greg Millen	58	3	0	1	0	4	4.14	0	32	28	.875
Team:	4843	80	49	23	8	208	2.58	4	2211	2003	.906

=== Playoffs ===
After reaching the Conference finals the prior two years and winning the Presidents' Trophy, hopes were extremely high entering the playoffs. The first round again reunited the Hawks with their old rivals from Minnesota who the Blackhawks needed seven games to dispatch in the prior year when the North Stars were the last place team in the division. This series however would not last seven games. The teams needed overtime to determine the winner of game one at the Chicago Stadium, however it was Minnesota who emerged as the 4–3 winner. The Blackhawks won Games 2 and 3, an easy 5–2 win in Chicago, and a close 6–5 win in Minnesota. However the North Stars swept the remaining games in blowout fashion including a 6–0 shutout on the Hawks home ice in game five. What was looking like it could be one of the greatest seasons in Hawks history was suddenly over. Minnesota won their next two series and reached the Stanley Cup Final where they lost to Mario Lemieux and the Pittsburgh Penguins in six games.

Scoring

Player	Pos	GP	G	A	Pts	PIM	+/-	PPG	SHG	GWG
Jeremy Roenick	C	6	3	5	8	4	2	1	0	1
Chris Chelios	D	6	1	7	8	46	2	1	0	0
Steve Larmer	RW	6	5	1	6	4	2	1	0	0
Warren Rychel	LW	3	1	3	4	2	1	1	0	1
Doug Wilson	D	5	2	1	3	2	1	2	0	0
Dirk Graham	W	6	1	2	3	17	2	0	0	0
Steve Thomas	LW	6	1	2	3	15	3	0	0	0
Mike Hudson	C/LW	6	0	2	2	8	1	0	0	0
Keith Brown	D	6	1	0	1	8	0	0	0	0
Steve Konroyd	D	6	1	0	1	8	1	0	0	0
Adam Creighton	C	6	0	1	1	10	0	0	0	0
Greg Gilbert	LW	5	0	1	1	2	1	0	0	0
Dominik Hasek	G	3	0	1	1	0	0	0	0	0
Dave Manson	D	6	0	1	1	36	2	0	0	0
Troy Murray	C	6	0	1	1	12	0	0	0	0
Wayne Presley	RW	6	0	1	1	38	0	0	0	0
Ed Belfour	G	6	0	0	0	6	0	0	0	0
Paul Gillis	C	2	0	0	0	2	1	0	0	0
Stu Grimson	LW	5	0	0	0	46	-1	0	0	0
Jocelyn Lemieux	RW	4	0	0	0	0	-2	0	0	0
Bob McGill	D	5	0	0	0	2	1	0	0	0
Tony McKegney	LW	2	0	0	0	4	0	0	0	0
Mike Peluso	LW	3	0	0	0	2	-1	0	0	0
Cam Russell	D	1	0	0	0	0	-1	0	0	0
Trent Yawney	D	1	0	0	0	0	0	0	0	0

Goaltending

Player	MIN	GP	W	L	GA	GAA	SO	SA	SV	SV%
Ed Belfour	295	6	2	4	20	4.07	0	183	163	.891
Dominik Hasek	69	3	0	0	3	2.61	0	39	36	.923
Team:	364	6	2	4	23	3.79	0	222	199	.896

Note: Pos = Position; GP = Games played; G = Goals; A = Assists; Pts = Points; +/- = plus/minus; PIM = Penalty minutes; PPG = Power-play goals; SHG = Short-handed goals; GWG = Game-winning goals
MIN = Minutes played; W = Wins; L = Losses; T = Ties; GA = Goals-against; GAA = Goals-against average; SO = Shutouts; SA = Shots against; SV = Shots saved; SV% = Save percentage;

== Awards and records ==
- Presidents' Trophy
- Calder Memorial Trophy: Ed Belfour
- Frank J. Selke Trophy: Dirk Graham
- Vezina Trophy: Ed Belfour
- William M. Jennings Trophy: Ed Belfour
- Ed Belfour, Goaltender, NHL All-Rookie Team
- Chris Chelios, Defence, NHL Second Team All-Star
- Jeremy Roenick, Center, NHL Second Team All-Star
- Steve Larmer, Right Wing, NHL Second Team All-Star
