= 1990–91 Buffalo Sabres season =

NHL hockey team season

1990–91 Buffalo Sabres
- Division: 3rd Adams
- Conference: 5th Wales
- 1990–91 record: 31–30–19
- Home record: 15–13–12
- Road record: 16–17–7
- Goals for: 292
- Goals against: 278

Team information
- General manager: Gerry Meehan
- Coach: Rick Dudley
- Captain: Mike Foligno (Oct-Dec); Vacant (Dec-Jan); Mike Ramsey (Jan-Apr)
- Arena: Buffalo Memorial Auditorium

Team leaders
- Goals: Dave Andreychuk (36)
- Assists: Dale Hawerchuk (58)
- Points: Dale Hawerchuk (89)
- Penalty minutes: Rob Ray (350)
- Wins: Daren Puppa (15)
- Goals against average: Darcy Wakaluk (3.33)

The 1990–91 Buffalo Sabres season was the 21st season for the National Hockey League (NHL) franchise that was established on May 22, 1970.

== Regular season ==
=== Final standings ===
Adams Division
	GP	W	L	T	GF	GA	Pts
**Boston Bruins**	80	44	24	12	299	264	100
**Montreal Canadiens**	80	39	30	11	273	249	89
**Buffalo Sabres**	80	31	30	19	292	278	81
**Hartford Whalers**	80	31	38	11	238	276	73
Quebec Nordiques	80	16	50	14	236	354	46

Note: GP = Games played, W = Wins, L = Losses, T = Ties, Pts = Points, GF = Goals for, GA = Goals against
Note: Teams that qualified for the playoffs are highlighted in bold.

Wales Conference
R		Div	GP	W	L	T	GF	GA	Pts
**1**	**Boston Bruins**	**ADM**	**80**	**44**	**24**	**12**	**299**	**264**	**100**
**2**	**Montreal Canadiens**	**ADM**	**80**	**39**	**30**	**11**	**273**	**249**	**89**
**3**	**Pittsburgh Penguins**	**PTK**	**80**	**41**	**33**	**6**	**342**	**305**	**88**
**4**	**New York Rangers**	**PTK**	**80**	**36**	**31**	**13**	**297**	**265**	**85**
**5**	**Washington Capitals**	**PTK**	**80**	**37**	**36**	**7**	**258**	**258**	**81**
**6**	**Buffalo Sabres**	**ADM**	**80**	**31**	**30**	**19**	**292**	**278**	**81**
**7**	**New Jersey Devils**	**PTK**	**80**	**32**	**33**	**15**	**272**	**264**	**79**
8	Philadelphia Flyers	PTK	80	33	37	10	252	267	76
**9**	**Hartford Whalers**	**ADM**	**80**	**31**	**38**	**11**	**238**	**276**	**73**
10	New York Islanders	PTK	80	25	45	10	223	290	60
11	Quebec Nordiques	ADM	80	16	50	14	236	354	46

Divisions: PTK – Patrick, ADM – Adams

bold – Qualified for playoffs

== Schedule and results ==
1990–91 regular season
October

Game	Result	Date	Score	Opponent	Record
1	T	October 4, 1990	3–3 OT	Montreal Canadiens (1990–91)	0–0–1
2	L	October 6, 1990	5–6	@ Montreal Canadiens (1990–91)	0–1–1
3	L	October 10, 1990	3–4	@ Hartford Whalers (1990–91)	0–2–1
4	L	October 12, 1990	2–4	Quebec Nordiques (1990–91)	0–3–1
5	T	October 13, 1990	4–4 OT	@ Quebec Nordiques (1990–91)	0–3–2
6	L	October 17, 1990	3–4	Montreal Canadiens (1990–91)	0–4–2
7	T	October 19, 1990	4–4 OT	Pittsburgh Penguins (1990–91)	0–4–3
8	W	October 20, 1990	3–1	@ New York Islanders (1990–91)	1–4–3
9	L	October 25, 1990	1–5	@ New Jersey Devils (1990–91)	1–5–3
10	W	October 27, 1990	3–1	@ Toronto Maple Leafs (1990–91)	2–5–3
11	W	October 28, 1990	5–0	Hartford Whalers (1990–91)	3–5–3
12	T	October 31, 1990	3–3 OT	Boston Bruins (1990–91)	3–5–4

November

Game	Result	Date	Score	Opponent	Record
13	W	November 3, 1990	4–1	@ Boston Bruins (1990–91)	4–5–4
14	W	November 4, 1990	2–1	Calgary Flames (1990–91)	5–5–4
15	L	November 7, 1990	2–6	@ New York Rangers (1990–91)	5–6–4
16	W	November 9, 1990	7–1	Vancouver Canucks (1990–91)	6–6–4
17	W	November 10, 1990	4–2	@ Washington Capitals (1990–91)	7–6–4
18	L	November 14, 1990	2–4	@ Los Angeles Kings (1990–91)	7–7–4
19	L	November 16, 1990	2–4	@ Edmonton Oilers (1990–91)	7–8–4
20	T	November 17, 1990	3–3 OT	@ Calgary Flames (1990–91)	7–8–5
21	T	November 21, 1990	5–5 OT	New York Rangers (1990–91)	7–8–6
22	W	November 23, 1990	3–2 OT	Edmonton Oilers (1990–91)	8–8–6
23	L	November 26, 1990	0–5	@ New York Rangers (1990–91)	8–9–6
24	W	November 28, 1990	2–1	@ Montreal Canadiens (1990–91)	9–9–6

December

Game	Result	Date	Score	Opponent	Record
25	L	December 1, 1990	2–4	@ Quebec Nordiques (1990–91)	9–10–6
26	T	December 2, 1990	3–3 OT	Detroit Red Wings (1990–91)	9–10–7
27	W	December 6, 1990	4–3	@ Philadelphia Flyers (1990–91)	10–10–7
28	L	December 7, 1990	3–4 OT	Hartford Whalers (1990–91)	10–11–7
29	L	December 9, 1990	2–3	Boston Bruins (1990–91)	10–12–7
30	L	December 11, 1990	3–8	@ Detroit Red Wings (1990–91)	10–13–7
31	L	December 14, 1990	3–4	Pittsburgh Penguins (1990–91)	10–14–7
32	L	December 16, 1990	3–5	St. Louis Blues (1990–91)	10–15–7
33	W	December 18, 1990	4–3 OT	@ Hartford Whalers (1990–91)	11–15–7
34	L	December 20, 1990	1–4	@ Boston Bruins (1990–91)	11–16–7
35	W	December 23, 1990	10–3	Quebec Nordiques (1990–91)	12–16–7
36	T	December 26, 1990	3–3 OT	Boston Bruins (1990–91)	12–16–8
37	W	December 28, 1990	5–0	Chicago Blackhawks (1990–91)	13–16–8
38	T	December 29, 1990	4–4 OT	@ New Jersey Devils (1990–91)	13–16–9
39	W	December 31, 1990	5–2	Philadelphia Flyers (1990–91)	14–16–9

January

Game	Result	Date	Score	Opponent	Record
40	W	January 2, 1991	5–4	New York Islanders (1990–91)	15–16–9
41	W	January 4, 1991	4–1	Winnipeg Jets (1990–91)	16–16–9
42	T	January 8, 1991	3–3 OT	@ Vancouver Canucks (1990–91)	16–16–10
43	L	January 10, 1991	2–5	@ Los Angeles Kings (1990–91)	16–17–10
44	W	January 12, 1991	5–3	@ Minnesota North Stars (1990–91)	17–17–10
45	W	January 14, 1991	9–3	@ Toronto Maple Leafs (1990–91)	18–17–10
46	W	January 16, 1991	5–3	Detroit Red Wings (1990–91)	19–17–10
47	W	January 22, 1991	6–4	Boston Bruins (1990–91)	20–17–10
48	W	January 24, 1991	5–4	@ Chicago Blackhawks (1990–91)	21–17–10
49	L	January 26, 1991	1–4	@ Montreal Canadiens (1990–91)	21–18–10
50	L	January 27, 1991	4–5	Calgary Flames (1990–91)	21–19–10
51	L	January 29, 1991	3–8	@ St. Louis Blues (1990–91)	21–20–10
52	L	January 31, 1991	1–4	Quebec Nordiques (1990–91)	21–21–10

February

Game	Result	Date	Score	Opponent	Record
53	L	February 3, 1991	2–3	Edmonton Oilers (1990–91)	21–22–10
54	L	February 6, 1991	4–5 OT	St. Louis Blues (1990–91)	21–23–10
55	T	February 8, 1991	4–4 OT	Los Angeles Kings (1990–91)	21–23–11
56	W	February 10, 1991	2–0	@ Winnipeg Jets (1990–91)	22–23–11
57	T	February 12, 1991	4–4 OT	@ Quebec Nordiques (1990–91)	22–23–12
58	T	February 13, 1991	6–6 OT	Minnesota North Stars (1990–91)	22–23–13
59	T	February 15, 1991	2–2 OT	Montreal Canadiens (1990–91)	22–23–14
60	L	February 17, 1991	0–3	Toronto Maple Leafs (1990–91)	22–24–14
61	L	February 19, 1991	3–6	@ Pittsburgh Penguins (1990–91)	22–25–14
62	W	February 23, 1991	5–4	@ Hartford Whalers (1990–91)	23–25–14
63	T	February 24, 1991	5–5 OT	Hartford Whalers (1990–91)	23–25–15
64	T	February 26, 1991	1–1 OT	@ New York Islanders (1990–91)	23–25–16
65	W	February 28, 1991	5–1	@ Quebec Nordiques (1990–91)	24–25–16

March

Game	Result	Date	Score	Opponent	Record
66	W	March 2, 1991	7–4	@ Boston Bruins (1990–91)	25–25–16
67	T	March 6, 1991	3–3 OT	New Jersey Devils (1990–91)	25–25–17
68	L	March 8, 1991	3–5	Chicago Blackhawks (1990–91)	25–26–17
69	L	March 10, 1991	5–7	Vancouver Canucks (1990–91)	25–27–17
70	L	March 12, 1991	2–5	@ Minnesota North Stars (1990–91)	25–28–17
71	W	March 13, 1991	6–2	@ Winnipeg Jets (1990–91)	26–28–17
72	L	March 16, 1991	4–6	@ Montreal Canadiens (1990–91)	26–29–17
73	W	March 17, 1991	6–1	Hartford Whalers (1990–91)	27–29–17
74	W	March 20, 1991	3–2 OT	Montreal Canadiens (1990–91)	28–29–17
75	L	March 23, 1991	3–6	@ Boston Bruins (1990–91)	28–30–17
76	W	March 24, 1991	6–2	Philadelphia Flyers (1990–91)	29–30–17
77	W	March 26, 1991	4–2	@ Washington Capitals (1990–91)	30–30–17
78	T	March 28, 1991	4–4 OT	Quebec Nordiques (1990–91)	30–30–18
79	T	March 30, 1991	5–5 OT	@ Hartford Whalers (1990–91)	30–30–19
80	W	March 31, 1991	5–2	Washington Capitals (1990–91)	31–30–19

Legend: Win (2 points) Loss (0 points) Tie (1 point)

== Playoffs ==
1991 Stanley Cup playoffs

Montreal vs. Buffalo
Date	Away	Home
April 3	Buffalo 5	7 Montreal
April 5	Buffalo 4	5 Montreal
April 7	Montreal 4	5 Buffalo
April 9	Montreal 4	6 Buffalo
April 11	Buffalo 3	4 Montreal	OT
April 13	Montreal 5	1 Buffalo
Montreal wins series 4–2

== Draft picks ==
Buffalo's draft picks at the 1990 NHL entry draft held at the BC Place in Vancouver, British Columbia.

Round	#	Player	Nationality	College/Junior/Club team (League)
1	14	Brad May	Canada	Niagara Falls Thunder (OHL)
4	82	Brian McCarthy	United States	Pingree School (USHS-MA)
5	97	Richard Smehlik	Czechoslovakia	TJ Vitkovice (Czechoslovakia)
5	100	Todd Bojcun	Canada	Peterborough Petes (OHL)
5	103	Brad Pascall	Canada	University of North Dakota (WCHA)
7	142	Viktor Gordiuk	Soviet Union	Krylya Sovetov (USSR)
8	166	Milan Nedoma	Czechoslovakia	Zetor Brno (Czechoslovakia)
9	187	Jason Winch	Canada	Niagara Falls Thunder (OHL)
10	208	Sylvain Naud	Canada	Laval Titan (QMJHL)
11	229	Ken Martin	United States	Belmont High School (USHS-MA)
12	250	Brad Rubachuk	Canada	Lethbridge Hurricanes (WHL)
S	24	Shane McFarlane	United States	University of North Dakota (WCHA)

== See also ==
- 1990–91 NHL season
