= Randy Ladouceur =

Canadian ice hockey player and coach (born 1960)

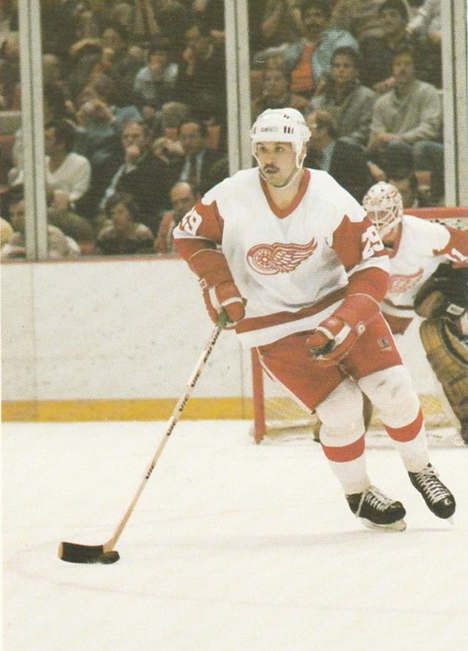
- Born: June 30, 1960 (age 66) Brockville, Ontario, Canada
- Height: 6 ft 2 in (188 cm)
- Weight: 220 lb (100 kg; 15 st 10 lb)
- Position: Defence
- Shot: Left
- Played for: Detroit Red Wings; Hartford Whalers; Mighty Ducks of Anaheim
- NHL draft: Undrafted
- Playing career: 1980–1996

Randall Ladouceur (born June 30, 1960) is a Canadian ice hockey coach and former professional ice hockey defenseman. He previously served as an assistant coach for the Montreal Canadiens, Hamilton Bulldogs and Toronto Maple Leafs.

== Career ==
Ladouceur played in the NHL as a defenceman from 1982 to 1996. He was a member of the Detroit Red Wings, Hartford Whalers and the Mighty Ducks of Anaheim. He played a total of 930 regular season games, scoring 30 goals and 126 assists for 156 points, collecting 1322 penalty minutes. He also played 40 playoff games in his career, scoring 13 points (5 goals and 8 assists). Ladouceur was a team captain for both Hartford and Anaheim. Ladouceur is the last player to wear sweater number 19 for Detroit, prior to the arrival of Steve Yzerman.

Ladouceur worked under Paul Maurice as an assistant coach of the Carolina Hurricanes between 1997 and 2004. On May 7, 2008, he was fired by interim Maple Leafs GM Cliff Fletcher, along with head coach Maurice. On July 31, 2013, Ladouceur was named an assistant coach of the Lake Erie Monsters of the American Hockey League.

== Personal life ==
Ladouceur was born in Brockville, Ontario. He currently resides with his family in Brockville.

== Career statistics ==
			Regular season					Playoffs
Season	Team	League	GP	G	A	Pts	PIM	GP	G	A	Pts	PIM
1976–77	Brockville Blackhawks	Midget	50	25	56	81	—	—	—	—	—	—
1977–78	Hamilton Fincups	OMJHL	64	8	20	28	82	20	0	0	0	9
1978–79	Brantford Alexanders	OMJHL	64	3	17	20	141	—	—	—	—	—
1979–80	Brantford Alexanders	OMJHL	37	6	15	21	125	8	0	5	5	18
1980–81	Kalamazoo Wings	IHL	80	7	30	37	52	8	1	3	4	10
1981–82	Adirondack Red Wings	AHL	78	4	28	32	78	5	1	1	2	6
1982–83	Detroit Red Wings	NHL	27	0	4	4	16	—	—	—	—	—
1982–83	Adirondack Red Wings	AHL	48	11	21	32	54	—	—	—	—	—
1983–84	Detroit Red Wings	NHL	71	3	17	20	58	4	1	0	1	6
1983–84	Adirondack Red Wings	AHL	11	3	5	8	12	—	—	—	—	—
1984–85	Detroit Red Wings	NHL	80	3	27	30	108	3	1	0	1	0
1985–86	Detroit Red Wings	NHL	78	5	13	18	196	—	—	—	—	—
1986–87	Detroit Red Wings	NHL	34	3	6	9	70	—	—	—	—	—
1986–87	Hartford Whalers	NHL	36	2	3	5	51	6	0	2	2	12
1987–88	Hartford Whalers	NHL	67	1	7	8	91	6	1	1	2	4
1988–89	Hartford Whalers	NHL	75	2	5	7	95	1	0	0	0	10
1989–90	Hartford Whalers	NHL	71	3	12	15	126	7	1	0	1	10
1990–91	Hartford Whalers	NHL	67	1	3	4	118	6	1	4	5	6
1991–92	Hartford Whalers	NHL	74	1	9	10	127	7	0	1	1	11
1992–93	Hartford Whalers	NHL	62	2	4	6	109	—	—	—	—	—
1993–94	Mighty Ducks of Anaheim	NHL	81	1	9	10	74	—	—	—	—	—
1994–95	Mighty Ducks of Anaheim	NHL	44	2	4	6	36	—	—	—	—	—
1995–96	Mighty Ducks of Anaheim	NHL	63	1	3	4	47	—	—	—	—	—
NHL totals			930	30	126	156	1322	40	5	8	13	59

Preceded by Ron Francis	Hartford Whalers captain 1991–92	Succeeded by Pat Verbeek
Preceded by Troy Loney	Mighty Ducks of Anaheim captain 1994–96	Succeeded by Paul Kariya
