= Ross McKay =

Canadian ice hockey player

- Born: March 3, 1964 (age 62) Edmonton, Alberta, Canada
- Height: 5 ft 11 in (180 cm)
- Weight: 175 lb (79 kg; 12 st 7 lb)
- Position: Goaltender
- Caught: Right
- Played for: Hartford Whalers
- NHL draft: Undrafted
- Playing career: 1988–1991

Ross Lee McKay (born March 3, 1964) is a Canadian former professional ice hockey goaltender who played in one National Hockey League game for the Hartford Whalers during the 1990–91 season. In this game, on March 17, 1991, he played 35 minutes against the Buffalo Sabres, allowing 3 goals on 15 shots. The rest of his career, which lasted from 1988 to 1991, he played in various minor leagues.

== Career ==
From 1981 to 1984 McKay played major junior hockey for the Calgary Wranglers of the Western Hockey League. He then played for the University of Saskatchewan for four years before signing a professional contract with National Hockey League team the Hartford Whalers in 1988. He split the following two season between the Indianapolis Ice of the IHL, the Knoxville Cherokees of the ECHL and the Binghamton Whalers of the AHL. During the 1990-91 season McKay made his NHL debut, playing 35 minutes of relief against the Buffalo Sabres and he helped the Whalers AHL affiliate the Springfield Falcons win the Calder Cup.

McKay served as team physician and an assistant coach for the NAHL Chicago Freeze from 1999 to 2001.

== Career statistics ==
=== Regular season and playoffs ===
			Regular season									Playoffs
Season	Team	League	GP	W	L	T	MIN	GA	SO	GAA	SV%	GP	W	L	MIN	GA	SO	GAA	SV%
1980–81	Calgary Canucks	AJHL	—	—	—	—	—	—	—	—	—	—	—	—	—	—	—	—	—
1981–82	Calgary Wranglers	WHL	1	—	—	—	53	1	0	1.13	.972	—	—	—	—	—	—	—	—
1982–83	Calgary Wranglers	WHL	29	14	6	0	1404	91	0	3.89	.872	2	—	—	35	5	0	8.57	—
1983–84	Calgary Wranglers	WHL	42	19	20	0	2342	175	0	4.48	.859	1	0	1	60	9	0	9.00	—
1984–85	University of Saskatchewan	CIAU	18	—	—	—	1099	59	2	3.22	—	—	—	—	—	—	—	—	—
1985–86	University of Saskatchewan	CIAU	15	—	—	—	887	59	2	3.99	.882	—	—	—	—	—	—	—	—
1986–87	University of Saskatchewan	CIAU	18	—	—	—	996	58	0	3.49	—	—	—	—	—	—	—	—	—
1987–88	University of Saskatchewan	CIAU	16	12	3	0	920	42	1	2.74	.900	2	1	1	148	11	0	4.46	—
1988–89	Binghamton Whalers	AHL	19	5	9	2	938	81	1	5.18	.834	—	—	—	—	—	—	—	—
1988–89	Indianapolis Ice	IHL	5	1	3	0	187	18	0	5.78	—	—	—	—	—	—	—	—	—
1989–90	Binghamton Whalers	AHL	18	0	10	1	713	58	0	4.88	.858	—	—	—	—	—	—	—	—
1989–90	Knoxville Cherokees	ECHL	8	4	2	1	426	20	0	2.82	.903	—	—	—	—	—	—	—	—
1990–91	Springfield Indians	AHL	23	7	10	3	1275	75	0	3.53	.883	3	1	2	191	11	0	3.46	—
1990–91	Hartford Whalers	NHL	1	0	0	0	35	3	0	5.17	.800	—	—	—	—	—	—	—	—
NHL totals			1	0	0	0	35	3	0	5.17	.800	—	—	—	—	—	—	—	—

== Personal life ==
After his playing career ended McKay became a chiropractor and practices in Westmont, Illinois. His son Dryden McKay is a goalie with the Bloomington Bison of the ECHL, having previously played with the Minnesota State of the Western Collegiate Hockey Association and in the American Hockey League with the Toronto Marlies.

== See also ==
- List of players who played only one game in the NHL
