= Paul Cyr =

Canadian ice hockey player (1963–2012)

- Born: October 31, 1963 Port Alberni, British Columbia, Canada
- Died: May 12, 2012 (aged 48) Nakusp, British Columbia, Canada
- Height: 5 ft 11 in (180 cm)
- Weight: 185 lb (84 kg; 13 st 3 lb)
- Position: Left wing
- Shot: Left
- Played for: Buffalo Sabres; New York Rangers; Hartford Whalers
- National team: Canada
- NHL draft: 9th overall, 1982; Buffalo Sabres
- Playing career: 1982–1993

Paul Andre Cyr (October 31, 1963 – May 12, 2012) was a Canadian professional ice hockey left wing who played for the Buffalo Sabres, New York Rangers and Hartford Whalers in the National Hockey League (NHL).

== Career ==
Cyr began his career with the Nanaimo Clippers of the British Columbia Hockey League, for whom he played the 1979–80 season, and then the Victoria Cougars of the Western Hockey League from 1980 to 1982. He was a member of the first Canadian team to win a gold medal at the World Junior Hockey Championship in 1982. Cyr only made the team after being recalled due to another player's injury. He scored in the Boxing Day game versus the Soviet Union. In the tournament, he scored a total of four goals and ten points in the ten games he played.

The Buffalo Sabres drafted Cyr ninth overall in the 1982 NHL entry draft. He made his debut for the Sabres that year, and played the next six seasons for the team, before being traded midway through the 1987–88 season to the New York Rangers in exchange for Mike Donnelly and a fifth round draft pick. After two injury-plagued seasons with the Rangers, Cyr signed as a free agent with the Hartford Whalers before the 1990–91 season. He had one successful year with the Whalers, appearing in 70 games and scoring 25 points. He was demoted to the Springfield Indians of the American Hockey League the subsequent year, where remained until his retirement in 1993.

Cyr played in a total of 470 games in the NHL over nine seasons, scoring 101 goals and 140 assists.

== Personal life and death ==
In 1987, Cyr was shot in the stomach while vacationing in the Dominican Republic. He recovered. His house burned down during his retirement, which he rebuilt himself. Cyr died of heart failure in May 2012.

== Career statistics ==
=== Regular season and playoffs ===
			Regular season					Playoffs
Season	Team	League	GP	G	A	Pts	PIM	GP	G	A	Pts	PIM
1979–80	Nanaimo Clippers	BCHL	60	28	52	80	202	—	—	—	—	—
1979–80	Victoria Cougars	WHL	—	—	—	—	—	7	0	0	0	4
1980–81	Victoria Cougars	WHL	64	36	22	58	85	14	6	5	11	46
1981–82	Victoria Cougars	WHL	58	52	56	108	167	4	3	2	5	12
1982–83	Victoria Cougars	WHL	20	21	22	43	61	—	—	—	—	—
1982–83	Buffalo Sabres	NHL	36	15	12	27	59	10	1	3	4	6
1983–84	Buffalo Sabres	NHL	71	16	27	43	52	3	0	1	1	0
1984–85	Buffalo Sabres	NHL	71	22	24	46	63	5	2	2	4	15
1985–86	Buffalo Sabres	NHL	71	20	31	51	120	—	—	—	—	—
1986–87	Buffalo Sabres	NHL	73	11	16	27	122	—	—	—	—	—
1987–88	Buffalo Sabres	NHL	20	1	1	2	38	—	—	—	—	—
1987–88	New York Rangers	NHL	40	4	13	17	41	—	—	—	—	—
1988–89	New York Rangers	NHL	1	0	0	0	2	—	—	—	—	—
1990–91	Hartford Whalers	NHL	70	12	13	25	107	6	1	0	1	10
1991–92	Hartford Whalers	NHL	17	0	3	3	19	—	—	—	—	—
1991–92	Springfield Indians	AHL	43	11	18	29	30	11	0	3	3	12
1992–93	Springfield Indians	AHL	41	7	14	21	44	15	3	2	5	12
NHL totals			470	101	140	241	623	24	4	6	10	31

=== International ===
Year	Team	Event	GP	G	A	Pts	PIM
1982	Canada	WJC	7	4	6	10	12
1983	Canada	WJC	7	1	3	4	19
Junior totals			14	5	9	14	31

== Awards ==
- WHL Second All-Star Team – 1982

Preceded by Phil Housley	Buffalo Sabres first-round draft pick 1982	Succeeded by Dave Andreychuk
