= 1990–91 Calgary Flames season =

NHL team season

1990–91 Calgary Flames
- Division: 2nd Smythe
- Conference: 4th Campbell
- 1990–91 record: 46–26–8
- Home record: 29–8–3
- Road record: 17–18–5
- Goals for: 344
- Goals against: 263

Team information
- General manager: Cliff Fletcher
- Coach: Doug Risebrough
- Captain: Rotating
- Alternate captains: Rotating
- Arena: Olympic Saddledome
- Average attendance: 19,986

Team leaders
- Goals: Theoren Fleury (51)
- Assists: Al MacInnis (75)
- Points: Theoren Fleury (104)
- Penalty minutes: Gary Roberts (252)
- Wins: Mike Vernon (31)
- Goals against average: Rick Wamsley (3.05)

The 1990–91 Calgary Flames season was the 11th National Hockey League season in Calgary. The Flames entered the season with a new coach, as they replaced Terry Crisp with Doug Risebrough. Crisp coached 277 games with the Flames over three years, and his .669 regular season winning percentage remains a Flames record.

The Los Angeles Kings ended the Flames three-year run at the top of the Smythe Division standings, finishing two points ahead of Calgary. The Flames finished 4th overall in the NHL Calgary's 344 goals led the NHL, the second time the Flames led the league in scoring. In the playoffs, Calgary met the defending champion Edmonton Oilers in the first round. Despite finishing 20 points ahead of Edmonton, the Flames fell to the Oilers in seven games.

Four Flames represented the Campbell Conference at the 1991 All-Star Game: forward Theoren Fleury, defencemen Al MacInnis and Gary Suter and goaltender Mike Vernon. Additionally, MacInnis was named to the first All-Star team for the second season in a row.

Fleury's 51 goals tied him for 2nd in league scoring, behind Brett Hull's 86. Fleury (104) and MacInnis (103) placed 8th and 9th respectively in league point scoring, with MacInnis leading the league in scoring by a defenceman. MacInnis also placed 3rd in the league in assists.

In an 8-4 Flames' road win over the St. Louis Blues on March 9, 1991, Theoren Fleury became the first NHL player to score three short-handed goals in a game.

== Regular season ==
For the second consecutive season, the Flames led the league in scoring (344 goals for), power-play goals scored (91: tied with the New York Rangers) and power-play percentage, with 23.70% (91 for 384).

=== Season standings ===
Smythe Division
| | GP | W | L | T | GF | GA | Pts |
|---|---|---|---|---|---|---|---|
| **Los Angeles Kings** | 80 | 46 | 24 | 10 | 340 | 254 | 102 |
| **Calgary Flames** | 80 | 46 | 26 | 8 | 344 | 263 | 100 |
| **Edmonton Oilers** | 80 | 37 | 37 | 6 | 272 | 272 | 80 |
| **Vancouver Canucks** | 80 | 28 | 43 | 9 | 243 | 315 | 65 |
| Winnipeg Jets | 80 | 26 | 43 | 11 | 260 | 288 | 63 |

Note: GP = Games played, W = Wins, L = Losses, T = Ties, Pts = Points, GF = Goals for, GA = Goals against
Note: Teams that qualified for the playoffs are highlighted in bold.

Campbell Conference
| R | | Div | GP | W | L | T | GF | GA | Pts |
|---|---|---|---|---|---|---|---|---|---|
| **1** | **p – Chicago Blackhawks** | **NRS** | **80** | **49** | **23** | **8** | **284** | **211** | **106** |
| **2** | **St. Louis Blues** | **NRS** | **80** | **47** | **22** | **11** | **310** | **250** | **105** |
| **3** | **Los Angeles Kings** | **SMY** | **80** | **46** | **24** | **10** | **340** | **254** | **102** |
| **4** | **Calgary Flames** | **SMY** | **80** | **46** | **26** | **8** | **344** | **263** | **100** |
| **5** | **Edmonton Oilers** | **SMY** | **80** | **37** | **37** | **6** | **272** | **272** | **80** |
| **6** | **Detroit Red Wings** | **NRS** | **80** | **34** | **38** | **8** | **273** | **298** | **76** |
| **7** | **Minnesota North Stars** | **NRS** | **80** | **27** | **39** | **14** | **256** | **266** | **68** |
| **8** | **Vancouver Canucks** | **SMY** | **80** | **28** | **43** | **9** | **243** | **315** | **65** |
| 9 | Winnipeg Jets | SMY | 80 | 26 | 43 | 11 | 260 | 288 | 63 |
| 10 | Toronto Maple Leafs | NRS | 80 | 23 | 46 | 11 | 241 | 318 | 57 |

Divisions: NRS – Norris, SMY – Smythe

bold – Qualified for playoffs; p – Won Presidents' Trophy

== Schedule and results ==
1990–91 regular season
October: 9–4–0 (home: 6–1–0; road: 3–3–0)

| Game | Date | Visitor | Score | Home | OT | Record | Pts |
|---|---|---|---|---|---|---|---|
| 1 | October 4 | Vancouver | 2 – 3 | Calgary | OT | 1–0–0 | 2 |
| 2 | October 6 | Toronto | 1 – 4 | Calgary | | 2–0–0 | 4 |
| 3 | October 8 | Calgary | 4 – 3 | Winnipeg | | 3–0–0 | 6 |
| 4 | October 10 | Calgary | 5 – 6 | Detroit | OT | 3–1–0 | 6 |
| 5 | October 13 | Calgary | 3 – 5 | New Jersey | | 3–2–0 | 6 |
| 6 | October 14 | Calgary | 3 – 1 | Chicago | | 4–2–0 | 8 |
| 7 | October 18 | St. Louis Blues | 4 – 3 | Calgary | | 4–3–0 | 8 |
| 8 | October 20 | Boston | 1 – 8 | Calgary | | 5–3–0 | 10 |
| 9 | October 21 | Calgary | 2 – 1 | Edmonton | | 6–3–0 | 12 |
| 10 | October 23 | Calgary | 4 – 6 | Los Angeles | | 6–4–0 | 12 |
| 11 | October 25 | Edmonton | 2 – 4 | Calgary | | 7–4–0 | 14 |
| 12 | October 27 | Washington | 4 – 9 | Calgary | | 8–4–0 | 16 |
| 13 | October 30 | New Jersey | 3 – 6 | Calgary | | 9–4–0 | 18 |

November: 5–5–3 (home: 2–2–1; road: 3–3–2)

| Game | Date | Visitor | Score | Home | OT | Record | Pts |
|---|---|---|---|---|---|---|---|
| 14 | November 1 | Winnipeg | 1 – 3 | Calgary | | 10–4–0 | 20 |
| 15 | November 3 | Calgary | 7 – 3 | Toronto | | 11–4–0 | 22 |
| 16 | November 4 | Calgary | 1 – 2 | Buffalo | | 11–5–0 | 22 |
| 17 | November 6 | Calgary | 5 – 6 | Pittsburgh | | 11–6–0 | 22 |
| 18 | November 8 | Calgary | 8 – 2 | Philadelphia | | 12–6–0 | 24 |
| 19 | November 10 | Calgary | 1 – 5 | NY Islanders | | 12–7–0 | 24 |
| 20 | November 11 | Calgary | 4 – 4 | NY Rangers | OT | 12–7–1 | 25 |
| 21 | November 15 | NY Islanders | 4 – 3 | Calgary | OT | 12–8–1 | 25 |
| 22 | November 17 | Buffalo | 3 – 3 | Calgary | OT | 12–8–2 | 26 |
| 23 | November 19 | Calgary | 6 – 4 | Vancouver | | 13–8–2 | 28 |
| 24 | November 22 | Los Angeles | 3 – 6 | Calgary | | 14–8–2 | 30 |
| 25 | November 24 | Chicago | 5 – 3 | Calgary | | 14–9–2 | 30 |
| 26 | November 28 | Calgary | 2 – 2 | Winnipeg | OT | 14–9–3 | 31 |

December: 8–5–1 (home: 3–4–0; road: 5–1–1)

| Game | Date | Visitor | Score | Home | OT | Record | Pts |
|---|---|---|---|---|---|---|---|
| 27 | December 1 | Calgary | 5 – 3 | Montreal | | 15–9–3 | 33 |
| 28 | December 2 | Calgary | 5 – 5 | Quebec | OT | 15–9–4 | 34 |
| 29 | December 5 | NY Rangers | 1 – 4 | Calgary | | 16–9–4 | 36 |
| 30 | December 7 | Quebec | 5 – 3 | Calgary | | 16–10–4 | 36 |
| 31 | December 9 | Calgary | 3 – 2 | Edmonton | | 17–10–4 | 38 |
| 32 | December 11 | Calgary | 5 – 4 | Minnesota | | 18–10–4 | 40 |
| 33 | December 13 | Calgary | 4 – 1 | Winnipeg | | 19–10–4 | 42 |
| 34 | December 16 | Calgary | 5 – 1 | Vancouver | | 20–10–4 | 44 |
| 35 | December 18 | Vancouver | 3 – 2 | Calgary | | 20–11–4 | 44 |
| 36 | December 20 | Los Angeles | 4 – 3 | Calgary | OT | 20–12–4 | 44 |
| 37 | December 22 | Edmonton | 6 – 2 | Calgary | | 20–13–4 | 44 |
| 38 | December 27 | Calgary | 1 – 4 | Edmonton | | 20–14–4 | 44 |
| 39 | December 29 | Hartford | 2 – 8 | Calgary | | 21–14–4 | 46 |
| 40 | December 31 | Montreal | 2 – 7 | Calgary | | 22–14–4 | 48 |

January: 5–6–1 (home: 3–0–0; road: 2–6–1)

| Game | Date | Visitor | Score | Home | OT | Record | Pts |
|---|---|---|---|---|---|---|---|
| 41 | January 2 | Calgary | 3 – 3 | Winnipeg | OT | 22–14–5 | 49 |
| 42 | January 5 | Detroit | 0 – 7 | Calgary | | 23–14–5 | 51 |
| 43 | January 8 | Calgary | 5 – 3 | Toronto | | 24–14–5 | 53 |
| 44 | January 10 | Calgary | 1 – 5 | Pittsburgh | | 24–15–5 | 53 |
| 45 | January 11 | Calgary | 2 – 4 | Washington | | 24–16–5 | 53 |
| 46 | January 13 | Calgary | 3 – 4 | Winnipeg | | 24–17–5 | 53 |
| 47 | January 15 | Winnipeg | 5 – 7 | Calgary | | 25–17–5 | 55 |
| 48 | January 22 | Calgary | 3 – 4 | Philadelphia | | 25–18–5 | 55 |
| 49 | January 23 | Calgary | 4 – 5 | Hartford | | 25–19–5 | 55 |
| 50 | January 26 | Calgary | 2 – 5 | Boston | | 25–20–5 | 55 |
| 51 | January 27 | Calgary | 5 – 4 | Buffalo | | 26–20–5 | 57 |
| 52 | January 30 | NY Rangers | 1 – 5 | Calgary | | 27–20–5 | 59 |

February: 8–2–2 (home: 6–0–1; road: 2–2–1)

| Game | Date | Visitor | Score | Home | OT | Record | Pts |
|---|---|---|---|---|---|---|---|
| 53 | February 2 | Chicago | 1 – 3 | Calgary | | 28–20–5 | 61 |
| 54 | February 5 | Calgary | 1 – 2 | New Jersey | | 28–21–5 | 61 |
| 55 | February 7 | Calgary | 4 – 1 | Boston | | 29–21–5 | 63 |
| 56 | February 9 | Calgary | 5 – 2 | Hartford | | 30–21–5 | 65 |
| 57 | February 12 | Calgary | 4 – 4 | Los Angeles | OT | 30–21–6 | 66 |
| 58 | February 15 | Washington | 2 – 8 | Calgary | | 31–21–6 | 68 |
| 59 | February 17 | St. Louis | 4 – 7 | Calgary | | 32–21–6 | 70 |
| 60 | February 19 | Detroit | 4 – 4 | Calgary | OT | 32–21–7 | 71 |
| 61 | February 21 | Vancouver | 4 – 6 | Calgary | | 33–21–7 | 73 |
| 62 | February 23 | Quebec | 8 – 10 | Calgary | | 34–21–7 | 75 |
| 63 | February 25 | Calgary | 2 – 4 | Vancouver | | 34–22–7 | 75 |
| 64 | February 27 | Edmonton | 2 – 4 | Calgary | | 35–22–7 | 77 |

March: 11–4–1 (home: 9–1–1; road: 2–3–0)

| Game | Date | Visitor | Score | Home | OT | Record | Pts |
|---|---|---|---|---|---|---|---|
| 65 | March 1 | Pittsburgh | 2 – 6 | Calgary | | 36–22–7 | 79 |
| 66 | March 2 | Minnesota | 1 – 5 | Calgary | | 37–22–7 | 81 |
| 67 | March 4 | Montreal | 2 – 3 | Calgary | OT | 38–22–7 | 83 |
| 68 | March 7 | Philadelphia | 2 – 4 | Calgary | | 39–22–7 | 85 |
| 69 | March 9 | Calgary | 8 – 4 | St. Louis | | 40–22–7 | 87 |
| 70 | March 10 | Calgary | 3 – 7 | Minnesota | | 40–23–7 | 87 |
| 71 | March 12 | Winnipeg | 3 – 5 | Calgary | | 41–23–7 | 89 |
| 72 | March 14 | NY Islanders | 2 – 4 | Calgary | | 42–23–7 | 91 |
| 73 | March 16 | Los Angeles | 4 – 3 | Calgary | | 42–24–7 | 91 |
| 74 | March 18 | Winnipeg | 3 – 4 | Calgary | OT | 43–24–7 | 93 |
| 75 | March 20 | Calgary | 3 – 2 | Vancouver | | 44–24–7 | 95 |
| 76 | March 23 | Calgary | 4 – 8 | Los Angeles | | 44–25–7 | 95 |
| 77 | March 26 | Vancouver | 2 – 7 | Calgary | | 45–25–7 | 97 |
| 78 | March 28 | Edmonton | 4 – 4 | Calgary | | 45–25–8 | 98 |
| 79 | March 29 | Calgary | 5 – 6 | Edmonton | OT | 45–26–8 | 98 |
| 80 | March 31 | Los Angeles | 3 – 5 | Calgary | | 46–26–8 | 100 |

Legend: Win (2 points) Loss (0 points) Tie (1 point)

== Playoffs ==
The Flames met their arch-rivals, the defending Stanley Cup champion Edmonton Oilers in the first round of the playoffs. Despite finishing 20 points ahead of Edmonton in the regular season, the Flames fell to the Oilers in seven games. Calgary's game six victory featured Theoren Fleury's memorable dash down the length of the ice following his overtime winning goal. It was the last time the rivals met in the playoffs, until 2022.

1991 Stanley Cup playoffs
Smythe Division Semifinals vs. Edmonton Oilers – Edmonton wins 4–3

| Game | Date | Visitor | Score | Home | OT | Attendance | Series |
|---|---|---|---|---|---|---|---|
| 1 | April 4 | Edmonton | 3 – 1 | Calgary | | 20,176 | Edmonton leads 1–0 |
| 2 | April 6 | Edmonton | 1 – 3 | Calgary | | 20,176 | Series tied 1–1 |
| 3 | April 8 | Calgary | 3 – 4 | Edmonton | | 17,242 | Edmonton leads 2–1 |
| 4 | April 10 | Calgary | 2 – 5 | Edmonton | | 17,503 | Edmonton leads 3–1 |
| 5 | April 12 | Edmonton | 3 – 5 | Calgary | | 20,176 | Edmonton leads 3–2 |
| 6 | April 14 | Calgary | 2 – 1 | Edmonton | OT | 17,503 | Series tied 3–3 |
| 7 | April 16 | Edmonton | 5 – 4 | Calgary | OT | 20,176 | Edmonton wins 4–3 |

Legend: Win Loss

== Player statistics ==
=== Skaters ===
Note: GP = Games played; G = Goals; A = Assists; Pts = Points; PIM = Penalty minutes

| | | Regular season | | | | | Playoffs |
| Player | # | GP | G | A | Pts | PIM | GP | G | A | Pts | PIM |
|---|---|---|---|---|---|---|---|---|---|---|---|
| Theoren Fleury | 14 | 79 | 51 | 53 | 104 | 136 | 7 | 2 | 5 | 7 | 14 |
| Al MacInnis | 2 | 78 | 28 | 75 | 103 | 90 | 7 | 2 | 3 | 5 | 8 |
| Joe Nieuwendyk | 25 | 79 | 45 | 40 | 85 | 36 | 7 | 4 | 1 | 5 | 10 |
| Doug Gilmour | 39 | 78 | 20 | 61 | 81 | 144 | 7 | 1 | 1 | 2 | 0 |
| Sergei Makarov | 42 | 78 | 30 | 49 | 79 | 44 | 3 | 1 | 0 | 1 | 0 |
| Gary Suter | 20 | 79 | 12 | 58 | 70 | 102 | 7 | 1 | 6 | 7 | 12 |
| Gary Roberts | 10 | 80 | 22 | 31 | 53 | 252 | 7 | 1 | 3 | 4 | 18 |
| Robert Reichel | 26 | 66 | 19 | 22 | 41 | 22 | 6 | 1 | 1 | 2 | 0 |
| Joel Otto | 29 | 76 | 19 | 20 | 39 | 183 | 7 | 1 | 2 | 3 | 8 |
| Stephane Matteau | 23 | 78 | 15 | 19 | 34 | 93 | 5 | 0 | 1 | 1 | 0 |
| Paul Ranheim | 28 | 39 | 14 | 16 | 30 | 4 | 7 | 2 | 2 | 4 | 0 |
| Brian MacLellan | 27 | 57 | 13 | 14 | 27 | 55 | 1 | 0 | 0 | 0 | 0 |
| Mark Hunter^{‡} | 22 | 57 | 10 | 15 | 25 | 125 | - | - | - | - | - |
| Jamie Macoun | 34 | 79 | 7 | 15 | 22 | 83 | 7 | 0 | 1 | 1 | 4 |
| Frank Musil^{†} | 3 | 67 | 7 | 14 | 21 | 160 | 7 | 0 | 0 | 0 | 10 |
| Ric Nattress | 6 | 58 | 5 | 13 | 18 | 63 | 7 | 1 | 0 | 1 | 2 |
| Roger Johansson | 21 | 38 | 4 | 13 | 17 | 47 | - | - | - | - | - |
| Tim Sweeney | 7 | 42 | 7 | 9 | 16 | 8 | - | - | - | - | - |
| Paul Fenton^{†} | 12 | 31 | 5 | 7 | 12 | 10 | 5 | 0 | 0 | 0 | 2 |
| Jim Kyte^{†} | 4 | 42 | 0 | 9 | 9 | 69 | 7 | 1 | 3 | 4 | 14 |
| Tim Hunter | 19 | 34 | 5 | 2 | 7 | 142 | 7 | 0 | 0 | 0 | 10 |
| Sergei Priakin | 16 | 24 | 1 | 6 | 7 | 0 | - | - | - | - | - |
| Ron Stern^{†} | 22 | 13 | 1 | 3 | 4 | 69 | 7 | 1 | 3 | 4 | 14 |
| Ken Sabourin^{‡} | 55 | 16 | 1 | 3 | 4 | 36 | - | - | - | - | - |
| Mike Vernon | 30 | 54 | 0 | 4 | 4 | 8 | 7 | 0 | 0 | 0 | 0 |
| Jiri Hrdina^{‡} | 17 | 14 | 0 | 3 | 3 | 4 | - | - | - | - | - |
| Martin Simard | 38 | 16 | 0 | 2 | 2 | 53 | - | - | - | - | - |
| Dana Murzyn | 5 | 19 | 0 | 2 | 2 | 30 | - | - | - | - | - |
| Rick Lessard | 32 | 1 | 0 | 1 | 1 | 0 | - | - | - | - | - |
| Rick Wamsley | 31 | 29 | 0 | 1 | 1 | 0 | 1 | 0 | 0 | 0 | 0 |
| Steve Guenette | 1 | 1 | 0 | 0 | 0 | 0 | - | - | - | - | - |
| Paul Kruse | 18 | 1 | 0 | 0 | 0 | 7 | - | - | - | - | - |
| Kevan Guy^{†} | 5 | 4 | 0 | 0 | 0 | 4 | - | - | - | - | - |
| Marc Bureau | 33 | 5 | 0 | 0 | 0 | 2 | - | - | - | - | - |
| Colin Patterson | 11 | - | - | - | - | - | 1 | 0 | 0 | 0 | 0 |

^{†}Denotes player spent time with another team before joining Calgary. Stats reflect time with the Flames only.
^{‡}Traded mid-season

=== Goaltenders ===
Note: GP = Games played; TOI = Time on ice (minutes); W = Wins; L = Losses; OT = Overtime/shootout losses; GA = Goals against; SO = Shutouts; GAA = Goals against average

| | | Regular season | | | | | | | | Playoffs |
| Player | # | GP | TOI | W | L | T | GA | SO | GAA | GP | TOI | W | L | GA | SO | GAA |
|---|---|---|---|---|---|---|---|---|---|---|---|---|---|---|---|---|
| Rick Wamsley | 31 | 29 | 1670 | 14 | 7 | 5 | 85 | 0 | 3.05 | 1 | 2 | 0 | 0 | 1 | 0 | 30.00 |
| Mike Vernon | 30 | 54 | 3121 | 31 | 19 | 3 | 172 | 1 | 3.31 | 7 | 427 | 3 | 4 | 21 | 0 | 2.95 |
| Steve Guenette | 1 | 1 | 60 | 1 | 0 | 0 | 4 | 0 | 4.00 | - | - | - | - | - | - | - |

== Transactions ==
The Flames were involved in the following transactions during the 1990–91 season.

=== Trades ===
| October 26, 1990 | To Calgary Flames Frank Musil | To Minnesota North Stars Brian Glynn |
| December 13, 1990 | To Calgary Flames Jim Kyte | To Pittsburgh Penguins Jiri Hrdina |
| January 24, 1991 | To Calgary Flames Paul Fenton | To Washington Capitals Ken Sabourin |
| March 5, 1991 | To Calgary Flames Carey Wilson | To Hartford Whalers Mark Hunter |
| March 5, 1991 | To Calgary Flames Ron Stern; Kevan Guy; Future Considerations | To Vancouver Canucks Dana Murzyn |

=== Free Agents ===
| Player / Former team | Player / New team |

== Draft picks ==
Calgary's picks at the 1990 NHL entry draft, held in Vancouver, British Columbia.

| Rnd | Pick | Player | Nationality | Position | Team (league) | NHL statistics | | | | |
| Rnd | Pick | Player | Nationality | Position | Team (league) | GP | G | A | Pts | PIM |
|---|---|---|---|---|---|---|---|---|---|---|
| 1 | 11 | Trevor Kidd | Canada | G | Brandon Wheat Kings (WHL) | 387 | 140–162–52, 2.84GAA | | | |
| 2 | 26 | Nicolas Perreault | Canada | D | N/A | | | | | |
| 2 | 32 | Vesa Viitakoski | Finland | LW | SaiPa (FNL) | 23 | 2 | 4 | 6 | 8 |
| 2 | 41 | Etienne Belzile | Canada | D | Cornell University (ECAC) | | | | | |
| 3 | 62 | Glen Mears | United States | D | Rochester Mustangs (USHL) | | | | | |
| 4 | 83 | Paul Kruse | Canada | LW | Kamloops Blazers (WHL) | 423 | 38 | 33 | 71 | 1074 |
| 6 | 125 | Chris Tschupp | United States | LW | N/A | | | | | |
| 7 | 146 | Dmitri Frolov | Soviet Union | D | Dynamo Moscow (USSR) | | | | | |
| 8 | 167 | Shawn Murray | United States | G | N/A | | | | | |
| 9 | 188 | Michael Murray | United States | RW | N/A | | | | | |
| 10 | 209 | Rob Sumner | Canada | D | Victoria Cougars (WHL) | | | | | |
| 12 | 251 | Leo Gudas | Czechoslovakia | D | N/A | | | | | |
| S | 25 | Lyle Wildgoose | Canada | LW | N/A | | | | | |

== See also ==
- 1990–91 NHL season
