= 1990–91 Montreal Canadiens season =

NHL hockey team season

1990–91 Montreal Canadiens
- Division: 2nd Adams
- Conference: 2nd Wales
- 1990–91 record: 39–30–11
- Home record: 23–12–5
- Road record: 16–18–6
- Goals for: 273
- Goals against: 249

Team information
- General manager: Serge Savard
- Coach: Pat Burns
- Captain: Guy Carbonneau
- Alternate captains: Mike McPhee; Brian Skrudland
- Arena: Montreal Forum

Team leaders
- Goals: Stephane Richer (31)
- Assists: Russ Courtnall (50)
- Points: Russ Courtnall (76)
- Penalty minutes: Lyle Odelein (259)
- Plus/minus: Brian Skrudland (+12)
- Wins: Patrick Roy (25)
- Goals against average: Patrick Roy (2.71)

The 1990–91 Montreal Canadiens season was the Canadiens' 82nd season. The Canadiens finished second in both the division and the conference to the Boston Bruins. Montreal defeated the Buffalo Sabres in the first round before losing to Boston in the Adams Division Finals in seven games.

== Offseason ==
Co-Captain Chris Chelios was traded to the Chicago Blackhawks for Denis Savard, in August 1990. With Chelios' departure, Guy Carbonneau continued as Canadiens captain.

Mats Naslund resumes his playing career in Europe. Veteran forwards Brian Skrudland and Mike McPhee are named alternate captains.

=== NHL draft ===
Montreal's draft picks at the 1990 NHL entry draft held at the BC Place in Vancouver, British Columbia.

Round	#	Player	Nationality	College/Junior/Club team (League)
1	12	Turner Stevenson	Canada	Seattle Thunderbirds (WHL)
2	39	Ryan Kuwabara	Canada	Ottawa 67's (OHL)
3	58	Charles Poulin	Canada	Saint-Hyacinthe Laser (QMJHL)
3	60	Robert Guillet	Canada	Longueuil College Francais (QMJHL)
4	81	Gilbert Dionne	Canada	Kitchener Rangers (OHL)
5	102	Paul DiPietro	Canada	Sudbury Wolves (OHL)
6	123	Craig Conroy	United States	Northwood School (USHS-NY)
7	144	Stephen Rohr	United States	Culver Military Academy (USHS-IN)
8	165	Brent Fleetwood	Canada	Portland Winter Hawks (WHL)
9	186	Derek Maguire	United States	Delbarton School (USHS-NJ)
10	207	Mark Kettelhut	United States	East High School (USHS-MN)
11	228	John Uniac	Canada	Kitchener Rangers (OHL)
12	249	Sergei Martinyuk	Soviet Union	Torpedo Yaroslavl (USSR)
S	23	Bruce Coles	Canada	Rensselaer Polytechnic Institute (ECAC)

== Regular season ==
In terms of injuries, Patrick Roy missed the most games due to injury during the 90–91 season. Backup goalies Andre Racicot and Jean-Claude Bergeron appeared in 25 games.

- December 12, 1990: Petr Svoboda and Toronto Maple Leafs winger Wendel Clark fell on Patrick Roy's left knee. Roy suffered strained ligaments.
- January 27, 1991: Donald Dufresne checked Bruins right winger Graeme Townshend. He fell on Patrick Roy's left ankle. Roy suffered a ruptured ligament and missed fourteen games. Roy would re-injure the ankle on March 16.

The Canadiens finished the regular season as the league's most disciplined team, being short-handed only 282 times.

=== Final standings ===
Adams Division
	GP	W	L	T	GF	GA	Pts
**Boston Bruins**	80	44	24	12	299	264	100
**Montreal Canadiens**	80	39	30	11	273	249	89
**Buffalo Sabres**	80	31	30	19	292	278	81
**Hartford Whalers**	80	31	38	11	238	276	73
Quebec Nordiques	80	16	50	14	236	354	46

Note: GP = Games played, W = Wins, L = Losses, T = Ties, Pts = Points, GF = Goals for, GA = Goals against
Note: Teams that qualified for the playoffs are highlighted in bold.

Wales Conference
R		Div	GP	W	L	T	GF	GA	Pts
**1**	**Boston Bruins**	**ADM**	**80**	**44**	**24**	**12**	**299**	**264**	**100**
**2**	**Montreal Canadiens**	**ADM**	**80**	**39**	**30**	**11**	**273**	**249**	**89**
**3**	**Pittsburgh Penguins**	**PTK**	**80**	**41**	**33**	**6**	**342**	**305**	**88**
**4**	**New York Rangers**	**PTK**	**80**	**36**	**31**	**13**	**297**	**265**	**85**
**5**	**Washington Capitals**	**PTK**	**80**	**37**	**36**	**7**	**258**	**258**	**81**
**6**	**Buffalo Sabres**	**ADM**	**80**	**31**	**30**	**19**	**292**	**278**	**81**
**7**	**New Jersey Devils**	**PTK**	**80**	**32**	**33**	**15**	**272**	**264**	**79**
8	Philadelphia Flyers	PTK	80	33	37	10	252	267	76
**9**	**Hartford Whalers**	**ADM**	**80**	**31**	**38**	**11**	**238**	**276**	**73**
10	New York Islanders	PTK	80	25	45	10	223	290	60
11	Quebec Nordiques	ADM	80	16	50	14	236	354	46

Divisions: PTK – Patrick, ADM – Adams

bold – Qualified for playoffs

== Playoffs ==
The Montreal Canadiens were eliminated in the Adams Division final by the Boston Bruins, four games to three.

== Schedule and results ==
1990–91 regular season
October

Game	Result	Date	Score	Opponent	Record
1	T	October 4, 1990	3–3 OT	@ Buffalo Sabres	0–0–1
2	W	October 6, 1990	6–5	Buffalo Sabres	1–0–1
3	W	October 8, 1990	5–3	Hartford Whalers	2–0–1
4	L	October 12, 1990	0–3	@ New York Rangers	2–1–1
5	L	October 13, 1990	2–5	@ Hartford Whalers	2–2–1
6	W	October 15, 1990	3–1	Washington Capitals	3–2–1
7	W	October 17, 1990	4–3	@ Buffalo Sabres	4–2–1
8	L	October 18, 1990	2–5	@ Detroit Red Wings	4–3–1
9	L	October 20, 1990	3–5	Philadelphia Flyers	4–4–1
10	W	October 23, 1990	5–4	@ Pittsburgh Penguins	5–4–1
11	W	October 24, 1990	8–2	New York Islanders	6–4–1
12	L	October 27, 1990	0–3	@ St. Louis Blues	6–5–1
13	L	October 28, 1990	1–2 OT	@ Chicago Blackhawks	6–6–1
14	W	October 31, 1990	4–2	@ Hartford Whalers	7–6–1

November

Game	Result	Date	Score	Opponent	Record
15	W	November 3, 1990	5–2	Detroit Red Wings	8–6–1
16	T	November 4, 1990	2–2 OT	Minnesota North Stars	8–6–2
17	L	November 7, 1990	0–2	Boston Bruins	8–7–2
18	W	November 10, 1990	3–1	New Jersey Devils	9–7–2
19	W	November 11, 1990	5–4 OT	Quebec Nordiques	10–7–2
20	L	November 13, 1990	3–6	@ New Jersey Devils	10–8–2
21	L	November 15, 1990	1–4	@ Philadelphia Flyers	10–9–2
22	T	November 17, 1990	1–1 OT	@ Boston Bruins	10–9–3
23	W	November 19, 1990	5–2	@ Quebec Nordiques	11–9–3
24	L	November 24, 1990	2–4	Los Angeles Kings	11–10–3
25	W	November 25, 1990	4–3	Winnipeg Jets	12–10–3
26	L	November 28, 1990	1–2	Buffalo Sabres	12–11–3
27	W	November 30, 1990	4–3	@ Washington Capitals	13–11–3

December

Game	Result	Date	Score	Opponent	Record
28	L	December 1, 1990	3–5	Calgary Flames	13–12–3
29	L	December 3, 1990	2–4	Hartford Whalers	13–13–3
30	W	December 5, 1990	4–3	@ Hartford Whalers	14–13–3
31	W	December 6, 1990	6–4	@ Boston Bruins	15–13–3
32	W	December 8, 1990	7–1	Boston Bruins	16–13–3
33	L	December 12, 1990	1–4	@ Toronto Maple Leafs	16–14–3
34	L	December 15, 1990	2–4	@ Winnipeg Jets	16–15–3
35	L	December 18, 1990	4–6	@ Quebec Nordiques	16–16–3
36	T	December 19, 1990	1–1 OT	Quebec Nordiques	16–16–4
37	W	December 22, 1990	3–1	New York Rangers	17–16–4
38	T	December 23, 1990	4–4 OT	@ Philadelphia Flyers	17–16–5
39	W	December 27, 1990	7–5	@ Vancouver Canucks	18–16–5
40	W	December 29, 1990	3–2	@ Los Angeles Kings	19–16–5
41	L	December 31, 1990	2–7	@ Calgary Flames	19–17–5

January

Game	Result	Date	Score	Opponent	Record
42	W	January 2, 1991	3–0	@ Edmonton Oilers	20–17–5
43	W	January 5, 1991	3–0	Quebec Nordiques	21–17–5
44	W	January 6, 1991	6–3	Pittsburgh Penguins	22–17–5
45	W	January 9, 1991	4–3 OT	New York Islanders	23–17–5
46	W	January 12, 1991	4–1	Washington Capitals	24–17–5
47	L	January 13, 1991	1–3	St. Louis Blues	24–18–5
48	W	January 15, 1991	5–1	@ Minnesota North Stars	25–18–5
49	W	January 17, 1991	4–2	@ St. Louis Blues	26–18–5
50	W	January 23, 1991	7–3	Toronto Maple Leafs	27–18–5
51	W	January 26, 1991	4–1	Buffalo Sabres	28–18–5
52	L	January 27, 1991	1–3	Boston Bruins	28–19–5
53	W	January 30, 1991	8–4	Winnipeg Jets	29–19–5
54	L	January 31, 1991	2–5	@ Boston Bruins	29–20–5

February

Game	Result	Date	Score	Opponent	Record
55	T	February 2, 1991	3–3 OT	@ New York Islanders	29–20–6
56	W	February 4, 1991	5–3	Minnesota North Stars	30–20–6
57	L	February 6, 1991	3–8	Chicago Blackhawks	30–21–6
58	W	February 7, 1991	5–1	@ Quebec Nordiques	31–21–6
59	W	February 9, 1991	6–4	New York Rangers	32–21–6
60	L	February 13, 1991	4–7	Boston Bruins	32–22–6
61	T	February 15, 1991	2–2 OT	@ Buffalo Sabres	32–22–7
62	L	February 16, 1991	1–2	Hartford Whalers	32–23–7
63	L	February 20, 1991	3–5	@ Hartford Whalers	32–24–7
64	T	February 23, 1991	3–3 OT	Toronto Maple Leafs	32–24–8
65	L	February 27, 1991	3–5	@ Detroit Red Wings	32–25–8

March

Game	Result	Date	Score	Opponent	Record
66	W	March 1, 1991	7–1	@ Vancouver Canucks	33–25–8
67	W	March 2, 1991	3–1	@ Edmonton Oilers	34–25–8
68	L	March 4, 1991	2–3 OT	@ Calgary Flames	34–26–8
69	W	March 6, 1991	5–3	@ Chicago Blackhawks	35–26–8
70	W	March 9, 1991	4–2	Vancouver Canucks	36–26–8
71	T	March 10, 1991	4–4 OT	Los Angeles Kings	36–26–9
72	T	March 12, 1991	4–4 OT	@ Pittsburgh Penguins	36–26–10
73	L	March 14, 1991	2–3	@ Boston Bruins	36–27–10
74	W	March 16, 1991	6–4	Buffalo Sabres	37–27–10
75	L	March 17, 1991	2–4	Edmonton Oilers	37–28–10
76	L	March 20, 1991	2–3 OT	@ Buffalo Sabres	37–29–10
77	T	March 23, 1991	3–3 OT	New Jersey Devils	37–29–11
78	W	March 25, 1991	3–2 OT	Hartford Whalers	38–29–11
79	W	March 30, 1991	4–3	Quebec Nordiques	39–29–11
80	L	March 31, 1991	1–4	@ Quebec Nordiques	39–30–11

Legend: Win (2 points) Loss (0 points) Tie (1 point)

== Player statistics ==
=== Regular season ===
==== Scoring ====
Player	Pos	GP	G	A	Pts	PIM	+/-	PPG	SHG	GWG
Russ Courtnall	RW	79	26	50	76	29	5	5	1	5
Stephane Richer	RW	75	31	30	61	53	0	9	0	4
Denis Savard	C	70	28	31	59	52	-1	7	2	0
Stephan Lebeau	C	73	22	31	53	24	4	8	0	2
Shayne Corson	LW	71	23	24	47	138	9	7	0	2
Guy Carbonneau	C	78	20	24	44	63	-1	4	1	3
Mike McPhee	LW	64	22	21	43	56	6	2	0	4
Mike Keane	RW	73	13	23	36	50	6	2	1	2
Brian Skrudland	C	57	15	19	34	85	12	1	1	2
Mathieu Schneider	D	69	10	20	30	63	7	5	0	3
Petr Svoboda	D	60	4	22	26	52	5	3	0	1
Eric Desjardins	D	62	7	18	25	27	7	0	0	1
Andrew Cassels	C	54	6	19	25	20	2	1	0	3
Mark Pederson	LW	47	8	15	23	18	3	4	0	2
Sylvain Lefebvre	D	63	5	18	23	30	-11	1	0	1
Tom Chorske	LW	57	9	11	20	32	-8	3	0	1
J.J. Daigneault	D	51	3	16	19	31	-2	2	0	0
Brent Gilchrist	LW	51	6	9	15	10	-3	1	0	1
Donald Dufresne	D	53	2	13	15	55	5	0	0	0
Sylvain Turgeon	LW	19	5	7	12	20	-2	1	0	1
John LeClair	LW	10	2	5	7	2	1	0	0	1
Alain Cote	D	28	0	6	6	26	8	0	0	0
Todd Ewen	RW	28	3	2	5	128	4	0	0	0
Benoit Brunet	LW	17	1	3	4	0	-1	0	0	0
Gerald Diduck	D	32	1	2	3	39	3	0	0	0
Patrick Lebeau	LW	2	1	1	2	0	0	0	0	0
Patrice Brisebois	D	10	0	2	2	4	1	0	0	0
Lyle Odelein	D	52	0	2	2	259	7	0	0	0
Patrick Roy	G	48	0	2	2	6	0	0	0	0
Jean-Claude Bergeron	G	18	0	1	1	0	0	0	0	0
Andre Racicot	G	21	0	1	1	0	0	0	0	0
Ryan Walter	C/LW	25	0	1	1	12	-3	0	0	0
Frederic Chabot	G	3	0	0	0	0	0	0	0	0
Gilbert Dionne	LW	2	0	0	0	0	-2	0	0	0
Luc Gauthier	D	3	0	0	0	2	1	0	0	0
Mario Roberge	LW	5	0	0	0	21	-2	0	0	0

==== Goaltending ====
Player	MIN	GP	W	L	T	GA	GAA	SO	SA	SV	SV%
Patrick Roy	2835	48	25	15	6	128	2.71	1	1362	1234	.906
Jean-Claude Bergeron	941	18	7	6	2	59	3.76	0	426	367	.862
Andre Racicot	975	21	7	9	2	52	3.20	1	479	427	.891
Frederic Chabot	108	3	0	0	1	6	3.33	0	45	39	.867
Team:	4859	80	39	30	11	245	3.03	2	2312	2067	.894

=== Playoffs ===
==== Scoring ====
Player	Pos	GP	G	A	Pts	PIM	PPG	SHG	GWG
Shayne Corson	LW	13	9	6	15	36	4	1	3
Stephane Richer	RW	13	9	5	14	6	1	0	1
Brian Skrudland	C	13	3	10	13	42	1	0	0
Denis Savard	C	13	2	11	13	35	1	0	0
Russ Courtnall	RW	13	8	3	11	7	2	2	1
Mathieu Schneider	D	13	2	7	9	18	1	0	0
Brent Gilchrist	LW	13	5	3	8	6	0	0	1
Mike McPhee	LW	13	1	7	8	12	1	0	0
Guy Carbonneau	C	13	1	5	6	10	0	0	1
Mike Keane	RW	12	3	2	5	6	0	0	0
Eric Desjardins	D	13	1	4	5	8	1	0	0
Stephan Lebeau	C	7	2	1	3	2	0	0	0
Andrew Cassels	C	8	0	2	2	2	0	0	0
Alain Cote	D	11	0	2	2	26	0	0	0
Sylvain Lefebvre	D	11	1	0	1	6	0	0	0
J.J. Daigneault	D	5	0	1	1	0	0	0	0
Donald Dufresne	D	10	0	1	1	21	0	0	0
Petr Svoboda	D	2	0	1	1	2	0	0	0
Sean Hill	D	1	0	0	0	0	0	0	0
John LeClair	LW	3	0	0	0	0	0	0	0
Lyle Odelein	D	12	0	0	0	54	0	0	0
Andre Racicot	G	2	0	0	0	0	0	0	0
Mario Roberge	LW	12	0	0	0	24	0	0	0
Patrick Roy	G	13	0	0	0	2	0	0	0
Sylvain Turgeon	LW	5	0	0	0	2	0	0	0
Ryan Walter	C/LW	5	0	0	0	2	0	0	0

==== Goaltending ====
Player	MIN	GP	W	L	GA	GAA	SO	SA	SV	SV%
Patrick Roy	785	13	7	5	40	3.06	0	394	354	.898
Andre Racicot	12	2	0	1	2	10.00	0	14	12	.857
Team:	797	13	7	6	42	3.16	0	408	366	.897

Note:

Pos = Position;GP = Games played; G = Goals; A = Assists; Pts = Points; PIM = Penalty minutes; +/- = Plus/minus; PPG = Power-play goals; SHG = Short-handed goals; GWG = Game-winning goals
Pos = Position;GP = Games played; Min, TOI = Minutes played; W = Wins; L = Losses; T,T/OT = Ties; OTL = Overtime losses; GA = Goals-against; GAA = Goals-against average; SO = Shutouts; SA = Shots against; SV = Shots saved;SV% = Save percentage;

== Transactions ==
- In November 1990, Brian Hayward was traded to the Minnesota North Stars for defenseman Jayson More.
