= 1990–91 New York Rangers season =

NHL hockey team season

1990–91 New York Rangers
- Division: 2nd Patrick
- Conference: 4th Wales
- 1990–91 record: 36–31–13
- Home record: 22–11–7
- Road record: 14–20–6
- Goals for: 297
- Goals against: 265

Team information
- General manager: Neil Smith
- Coach: Roger Neilson
- Captain: Kelly Kisio
- Arena: Madison Square Garden

Team leaders
- Goals: Mike Gartner (49)
- Assists: Brian Leetch (72)
- Points: Brian Leetch (88)
- Penalty minutes: Troy Mallette (252)
- Wins: Mike Richter (21)
- Goals against average: Mike Richter (3.12)

The 1990–91 New York Rangers season was the franchise's 65th season. During the regular season, the Rangers were 36–31–13 and finished in second place in the Patrick Division, qualifying for the playoffs. In the division semi-finals, New York lost in six games to the Washington Capitals.

== Regular season ==
The Rangers' 91 power-play goals scored during the regular season were good enough for first place in the league, tied with the Calgary Flames. The Rangers finished second overall in power-play percentage, with 23.39% (91 for 389).

=== Final standings ===
Patrick Division
	GP	W	L	T	GF	GA	Pts
**Pittsburgh Penguins**	80	41	33	6	342	305	88
**New York Rangers**	80	36	31	13	297	265	85
**Washington Capitals**	80	37	36	7	258	258	81
**New Jersey Devils**	80	32	33	15	272	264	79
Philadelphia Flyers	80	33	37	10	252	267	76
New York Islanders	80	25	45	10	223	290	60

Note: GP = Games played, W = Wins, L = Losses, T = Ties, Pts = Points, GF = Goals for, GA = Goals against
Note: Teams that qualified for the playoffs are highlighted in bold.

Wales Conference
R		Div	GP	W	L	T	GF	GA	Pts
**1**	**Boston Bruins**	**ADM**	**80**	**44**	**24**	**12**	**299**	**264**	**100**
**2**	**Montreal Canadiens**	**ADM**	**80**	**39**	**30**	**11**	**273**	**249**	**89**
**3**	**Pittsburgh Penguins**	**PTK**	**80**	**41**	**33**	**6**	**342**	**305**	**88**
**4**	**New York Rangers**	**PTK**	**80**	**36**	**31**	**13**	**297**	**265**	**85**
**5**	**Washington Capitals**	**PTK**	**80**	**37**	**36**	**7**	**258**	**258**	**81**
**6**	**Buffalo Sabres**	**ADM**	**80**	**31**	**30**	**19**	**292**	**278**	**81**
**7**	**New Jersey Devils**	**PTK**	**80**	**32**	**33**	**15**	**272**	**264**	**79**
8	Philadelphia Flyers	PTK	80	33	37	10	252	267	76
**9**	**Hartford Whalers**	**ADM**	**80**	**31**	**38**	**11**	**238**	**276**	**73**
10	New York Islanders	PTK	80	25	45	10	223	290	60
11	Quebec Nordiques	ADM	80	16	50	14	236	354	46

Divisions: PTK – Patrick, ADM – Adams

bold – Qualified for playoffs

== Schedule and results ==
1990–91 regular season
October: 11–3–0 (home: 8–0–0; road: 3–3–0)

Game	October	Opponent	Score	Record
1	4	@ Chicago Blackhawks	4 – 3	0–1–0
2	6	@ Hartford Whalers	5 – 4	0–2–0
3	8	Minnesota North Stars	6 – 3	1–2–0
4	10	Washington Capitals	4 – 2	2–2–0
5	12	Montreal Canadiens	3 – 0	3–2–0
6	13	@ Washington Capitals	5 – 2	4–2–0
7	17	Winnipeg Jets	5 – 3	5–2–0
8	19	@ New Jersey Devils	3 – 2	5–3–0
9	20	@ Pittsburgh Penguins	4 – 3	6–3–0
10	22	Toronto Maple Leafs	5 – 1	7–3–0
11	25	Philadelphia Flyers	5 – 3	8–3–0
12	27	@ Quebec Nordiques	4 – 1	9–3–0
13	29	Quebec Nordiques	5 – 0	10–3–0
14	31	Los Angeles Kings	9 – 4	11–3–0

November: 5–5–5 (home: 2–3–2; road: 3–2–3)

Game	November	Opponent	Score	Record
15	2	New York Islanders	3 – 2	11–4–0
16	3	@ Pittsburgh Penguins	3 – 1	11–5–0
17	5	Boston Bruins	3 – 2 OT	11–6–0
18	7	Buffalo Sabres	6 – 2	12–6–0
19	9	@ New Jersey Devils	3 – 2	13–6–0
20	11	Calgary Flames	4 – 4 OT	13–6–1
21	13	@ Philadelphia Flyers	1 – 1 OT	13–6–2
22	15	@ Minnesota North Stars	4 – 2	14–6–2
23	16	@ Winnipeg Jets	6 – 4	15–6–2
24	19	Minnesota North Stars	2 – 2 OT	15–6–3
25	21	@ Buffalo Sabres	5 – 5 OT	15–6–4
26	24	@ New York Islanders	2 – 2 OT	15–6–5
27	26	Buffalo Sabres	5 – 0	16–6–5
28	28	Washington Capitals	6 – 3	16–7–5
29	30	@ Philadelphia Flyers	5 – 1	16–8–5

December: 5–5–2 (home: 1–2–2; road: 4–3–0)

Game	December	Opponent	Score	Record
30	1	@ Boston Bruins	5 – 4	17–8–5
31	3	Pittsburgh Penguins	9 – 4	17–9–5
32	5	@ Calgary Flames	4 – 1	17–10–5
33	7	@ Edmonton Oilers	4 – 3	17–11–5
34	11	@ Los Angeles Kings	6 – 4	18–11–5
35	14	@ Vancouver Canucks	5 – 3	19–11–5
36	17	Washington Capitals	5 – 3	20–11–5
37	19	Toronto Maple Leafs	4 – 1	20–12–5
38	22	@ Montreal Canadiens	3 – 1	20–13–5
39	23	Boston Bruins	5 – 5 OT	20–13–6
40	28	@ Washington Capitals	5 – 3	21–13–6
41	30	New Jersey Devils	2 – 2 OT	21–13–7

January: 6–5–2 (home: 3–2–1; road: 3–3–1)

Game	January	Opponent	Score	Record
42	2	Los Angeles Kings	4 – 1	22–13–7
43	3	@ Pittsburgh Penguins	7 – 5	23–13–7
44	5	@ St. Louis Blues	3 – 2 OT	24–13–7
45	7	Philadelphia Flyers	3 – 2	25–13–7
46	9	St. Louis Blues	3 – 2	25–14–7
47	11	@ Detroit Red Wings	6 – 3	25–15–7
48	13	Hartford Whalers	4 – 3	26–15–7
49	15	Edmonton Oilers	2 – 2 OT	26–15–8
50	17	Chicago Blackhawks	3 – 2	26–16–8
51	22	@ New York Islanders	3 – 2	26–17–8
52	25	@ Edmonton Oilers	4 – 3	27–17–8
53	30	@ Calgary Flames	5 – 1	27–18–8
54	31	@ Vancouver Canucks	3 – 3 OT	27–18–9

February: 5–4–3 (home: 5–2–1; road: 0–2–2)

Game	February	Opponent	Score	Record
55	3	Winnipeg Jets	4 – 3	27–19–9
56	6	New York Islanders	5 – 2	28–19–9
57	8	Vancouver Canucks	8 – 1	29–19–9
58	9	@ Montreal Canadiens	6 – 4	29–20–9
59	13	New Jersey Devils	6 – 3	30–20–9
60	15	Hartford Whalers	5 – 3	31–20–9
61	18	New York Islanders	5 – 4	31–21–9
62	21	@ Philadelphia Flyers	4 – 4 OT	31–21–10
63	22	@ Washington Capitals	3 – 2	31–22–10
64	24	New Jersey Devils	5 – 2	32–22–10
65	27	Washington Capitals	4 – 4 OT	32–22–11
66	28	@ St. Louis Blues	4 – 4 OT	32–22–12

March: 4–9–1 (home: 3–2–1; road: 1–7–0)

Game	March	Opponent	Score	Record
67	2	@ Toronto Maple Leafs	5 – 2	33–22–12
68	4	Philadelphia Flyers	6 – 2	34–22–12
69	7	@ Quebec Nordiques	4 – 2	34–23–12
70	9	@ New York Islanders	6 – 4	34–24–12
71	10	@ Chicago Blackhawks	5 – 2	34–25–12
72	13	Detroit Red Wings	4 – 1	34–26–12
73	15	@ New Jersey Devils	5 – 2	34–27–12
74	17	Pittsburgh Penguins	4 – 2	34–28–12
75	21	@ Pittsburgh Penguins	5 – 4 OT	34–29–12
76	23	@ Philadelphia Flyers	7 – 4	34–30–12
77	24	New York Islanders	3 – 1	35–30–12
78	26	New Jersey Devils	3 – 3 OT	35–30–13
79	30	@ Detroit Red Wings	6 – 5	35–31–13
80	31	Pittsburgh Penguins	6 – 3	36–31–13

Legend: Win (2 points) Loss (0 points) Tie (1 point)

== Playoffs ==
1991 Stanley Cup playoffs
Division semifinals vs. (P3) Washington Capitals – Capitals win 4–2

Game	Date	Visitor	Score	Home	OT	Attendance	Series
1	April 3	Washington Capitals	1 – 2	New York Rangers		16,792	Rangers lead series 1–0
2	April 5	Washington Capitals	3 – 0	New York Rangers		16,792	Series tied 1–1
3	April 7	New York Rangers	6 – 0	Washington Capitals		16,592	Rangers lead series 2–1
4	April 9	New York Rangers	2 – 3	Washington Capitals		15,741	Series tied 2–2
5	April 11	Washington Capitals	5 – 4	New York Rangers		16,792	Washington leads series 3–2
6	April 13	New York Rangers	2 – 4	Washington Capitals		18,130	Washington wins series 4–2

Legend: Win Loss

== Player statistics ==
Skaters

Regular season
Player	GP	G	A	Pts	+/-	PIM
Brian Leetch	80	16	72	88	2	42
Bernie Nicholls	71	25	48	73	5	96
Mike Gartner	79	49	20	69	-9	53
Darren Turcotte	74	26	41	67	-5	37
Brian Mullen	79	19	43	62	12	44
James Patrick	74	10	49	59	-5	58
John Ogrodnick	79	31	23	54	15	10
Ray Sheppard	59	24	23	47	8	21
Kevin Miller^{‡}	63	17	27	44	1	63
Kelly Kisio	51	15	20	35	3	58
Kris King	72	11	14	25	-1	154
Jan Erixon	53	7	18	25	13	8
Randy Moller	61	4	19	23	13	161
Troy Mallette	71	12	10	22	-8	252
Mark Janssens	67	9	7	16	-1	172
Jody Hull	47	5	8	13	2	10
David Shaw	77	2	10	12	8	89
Paul Broten	28	4	6	10	7	18
Normand Rochefort	44	3	7	10	10	35
Miloslav Horava	29	1	6	7	2	12
Mark Hardy	70	1	5	6	-1	89
Corey Millen	4	3	1	4	1	0
Steven Rice	11	1	1	2	2	4
Jeff Bloemberg	3	0	2	2	3	0
Joe Cirella^{†}	19	1	0	1	1	52
Tie Domi	28	1	0	1	-5	185
Lindy Ruff	14	0	1	1	-2	27
Brian McReynolds	1	0	0	0	-1	0
Joey Kocur^{†}	5	0	0	0	-1	36
Rick Bennett	6	0	0	0	-2	6
Dennis Vial^{‡}	21	0	0	0	-4	61

Playoffs
Player	GP	G	A	Pts	PIM
Bernie Nicholls	5	4	3	7	8
Brian Leetch	6	1	3	4	0
Steven Rice	2	2	1	3	6
Corey Millen	6	1	2	3	0
Mark Janssens	6	3	0	3	6
Jan Erixon	6	1	2	3	0
Darren Turcotte	6	1	2	3	0
Joey Kocur	6	0	2	2	21
Tony Amonte	2	0	2	2	2
Joe Cirella	6	0	2	2	26
Randy Moller	6	0	2	2	11
Kris King	6	2	0	2	36
Brian Mullen	6	0	2	2	0
Mike Gartner	6	1	1	2	0
Mark Hardy	6	0	1	1	30
Doug Weight	1	0	0	0	0
Paul Broten	5	0	0	0	2
David Shaw	6	0	0	0	11
Troy Mallette	5	0	0	0	18
John Ogrodnick	4	0	0	0	0
James Patrick	6	0	0	0	6

Goaltenders

Regular season
Player	GP	TOI	W	L	T	GA	GAA	SA	SV%	SO
Mike Richter	45	2596	21	13	7	135	3.12	1392	.903	0
John Vanbiesbrouck	40	2257	15	18	6	126	3.35	1154	.891	3

Playoffs
Player	GP	TOI	W	L	GA	GAA	SA	SV%	SO
Mike Richter	6	313	2	4	14	2.69	182	.923	1
John Vanbiesbrouck	1	52	0	0	1	1.16	22	.955	0

^{†}Denotes player spent time with another team before joining Rangers. Stats reflect time with Rangers only.
^{‡}Traded mid-season. Stats reflect time with Rangers only.

Note:

Pos = Position;GP = Games played; G = Goals; A = Assists; Pts = Points; PIM = Penalty minutes; +/- = Plus/minus; PPG = Power-play goals; SHG = Short-handed goals; GWG = Game-winning goals
Pos = Position;GP = Games played; Min, TOI = Minutes played; W = Wins; L = Losses; T,T/OT = Ties; OTL = Overtime losses; GA = Goals-against; GAA = Goals-against average; SO = Shutouts; SA = Shots against; SV = Shots saved;SV% = Save percentage;

== Draft picks ==
New York's picks at the 1990 NHL entry draft in Vancouver, British Columbia, Canada at the BC Place Stadium.

Round	#	Player	Position	Nationality	College/Junior/Club team (League)
1	13	Michael Stewart	D	Canada	Michigan State University (NCAA)
2	34	Doug Weight	C	United States	Lake Superior State University (NCAA)
3	55	John Vary	D	Canada	North Bay Centennials (OHL)
4	69	Jeff Nielsen	RW	United States	Grand Rapids H.S. (Minnesota)
4	76	Rick Willis	LW	United States	Pingree H.S. (Massachusetts)
5	85	Sergei Zubov	D	Soviet Union	CSKA Moscow (USSR)
5	99	Lubos Rob	C	Czechoslovakia	HC Ceske Budejovice (Czechoslovakia)
6	118	Jason Weinrich	D	United States	Springfield Olympics (NEJHL)
7	139	Bryan Lonsinger	D	United States	Choate Academy (Connecticut)
8	160	Todd Hedlund	RW	United States	Roseau H.S. (Minnesota)
9	181	Andrew Silverman	D	United States	Beverly H.S. (Massachusetts)
10	202	Jon Hillebrandt	G	United States	Monona Grove H.S. (New York)
11	223	Brett Lievers	C	United States	Wayzata H.S. (Minnesota)
12	244	Sergei Nemchinov	C	Soviet Union	Krylja Sovetov (USSR)

=== Supplemental Draft ===
New York's picks at the 1990 NHL supplemental draft.

Round	#	Player	Position	Nationality	College/Junior/Club team (League)
2	18	Mike Gilmore	G	United States	Michigan State University (CCHA)

== See also ==
- 1990-91 NHL season
