= 1990–91 Toronto Maple Leafs season =

NHL hockey team season

1990–91 Toronto Maple Leafs
- Division: 5th Norris
- Conference: 10th Campbell
- 1990–91 record: 23–46–11
- Home record: 15–21–4
- Road record: 8–25–7
- Goals for: 241
- Goals against: 318

Team information
- General manager: Floyd Smith
- Coach: Doug Carpenter and Tom Watt
- Captain: Rob Ramage
- Alternate captains: Wendel Clark; Brad Marsh
- Arena: Maple Leaf Gardens

Team leaders
- Goals: Vincent Damphousse (26)
- Assists: Vincent Damphousse (47)
- Points: Vincent Damphousse (73)
- Penalty minutes: Luke Richardson (238)
- Wins: Peter Ing (16)
- Goals against average: Peter Ing (3.84)

The 1990–91 Toronto Maple Leafs season was the 74th season of the Toronto NHL franchise. The Leafs finished fifth and last in the Norris Division and did not qualify for the playoffs for the first time since the 1988–89 season. They finished last in the conference for the first time since the 1988–89 season.

== Offseason ==
=== NHL draft ===
Round	Pick	Player	Nationality	College/junior/club team
1	10	Drake Berehowsky (D)	Canada	Kingston Frontenacs (OHL)
2	31	Felix Potvin (G)	Canada	Chicoutimi Saguenéens (QMJHL)
4	73	Darby Hendrickson (C)	United States	Richfield High School (USHS-MN)
4	80	Greg Walters (C)	Canada	Ottawa 67's (OHL)
6	115	Alexander Godynyuk (D)	Soviet Union	Sokil Kiev (USSR)
7	136	Eric Lacroix (LW)	Canada	Governor Dummer Academy (USHS-MA)
8	157	Dan Stiver (RW)	Canada	University of Michigan (CCHA)
9	178	Robert Horyna (G)	Czechoslovakia	Dukla Jihlava (Czechoslovakia)
10	199	Bob Chebator (LW)	United States	Arlington High School (USHS-MA)
11	220	Scott Malone (D)	United States	Northfield Mount Hermon School (USHS-MA)
12	241	Nicholas Vachon (LW)	Canada	Governor Dummer Academy (USHS-MA)
S	15	Martin Robitaille (C)	Canada	University of Maine (Hockey East)

== Regular season ==
- Dave Reid had a career high 15 goals. He led the league with 8 shorthanded goals. In November, Reid had five shorthanded goals over four games.
- Allan Bester was traded by Maple Leafs to Detroit Red Wings for sixth-round choice (Alexander Kuzminsky) in 1991 entry draft, March 5, 1991.

=== Season standings ===
Norris Division
	GP	W	L	T	GF	GA	Pts
**Chicago Blackhawks**	80	49	23	8	284	211	106
**St. Louis Blues**	80	47	22	11	310	250	105
**Detroit Red Wings**	80	34	38	8	273	298	76
**Minnesota North Stars**	80	27	39	14	256	266	68
Toronto Maple Leafs	80	23	46	11	241	318	57

Note: GP = Games played, W = Wins, L = Losses, T = Ties, Pts = Points, GF = Goals for, GA = Goals against
Note: Teams that qualified for the playoffs are highlighted in bold.

Campbell Conference
R		Div	GP	W	L	T	GF	GA	Pts
**1**	**p – Chicago Blackhawks**	**NRS**	**80**	**49**	**23**	**8**	**284**	**211**	**106**
**2**	**St. Louis Blues**	**NRS**	**80**	**47**	**22**	**11**	**310**	**250**	**105**
**3**	**Los Angeles Kings**	**SMY**	**80**	**46**	**24**	**10**	**340**	**254**	**102**
**4**	**Calgary Flames**	**SMY**	**80**	**46**	**26**	**8**	**344**	**263**	**100**
**5**	**Edmonton Oilers**	**SMY**	**80**	**37**	**37**	**6**	**272**	**272**	**80**
**6**	**Detroit Red Wings**	**NRS**	**80**	**34**	**38**	**8**	**273**	**298**	**76**
**7**	**Minnesota North Stars**	**NRS**	**80**	**27**	**39**	**14**	**256**	**266**	**68**
**8**	**Vancouver Canucks**	**SMY**	**80**	**28**	**43**	**9**	**243**	**315**	**65**
9	Winnipeg Jets	SMY	80	26	43	11	260	288	63
10	Toronto Maple Leafs	NRS	80	23	46	11	241	318	57

Divisions: NRS – Norris, SMY – Smythe

bold – Qualified for playoffs; p – Won Presidents' Trophy

== Schedule and results ==
1990–91 regular season
October

Game	Result	Date	Score	Opponent	Record
1	L	October 4, 1990	1–7	@ Winnipeg Jets (1990–91)	0–1–0
2	L	October 6, 1990	1–4	@ Calgary Flames (1990–91)	0–2–0
3	L	October 7, 1990	2–3	@ Edmonton Oilers (1990–91)	0–3–0
4	L	October 10, 1990	5–8	Quebec Nordiques (1990–91)	0–4–0
5	T	October 13, 1990	3–3 OT	Detroit Red Wings (1990–91)	0–4–1
6	L	October 17, 1990	1–3	Hartford Whalers (1990–91)	0–5–1
7	L	October 18, 1990	0–3	@ Chicago Blackhawks (1990–91)	0–6–1
8	W	October 20, 1990	6–2	Chicago Blackhawks (1990–91)	1–6–1
9	L	October 22, 1990	1–5	@ New York Rangers (1990–91)	1–7–1
10	L	October 24, 1990	3–8	St. Louis Blues (1990–91)	1–8–1
11	L	October 25, 1990	5–8	@ St. Louis Blues (1990–91)	1–9–1
12	L	October 27, 1990	1–3	Buffalo Sabres (1990–91)	1–10–1
13	W	October 30, 1990	5–4	Minnesota North Stars (1990–91)	2–10–1

November

Game	Result	Date	Score	Opponent	Record
14	L	November 1, 1990	4–5	@ Detroit Red Wings (1990–91)	2–11–1
15	L	November 3, 1990	3–7	Calgary Flames (1990–91)	2–12–1
16	L	November 4, 1990	1–7	Philadelphia Flyers (1990–91)	2–13–1
17	L	November 6, 1990	3–4	@ New York Islanders (1990–91)	2–14–1
18	L	November 8, 1990	3–5	Vancouver Canucks (1990–91)	2–15–1
19	L	November 10, 1990	1–5	Chicago Blackhawks (1990–91)	2–16–1
20	W	November 12, 1990	5–2	Winnipeg Jets (1990–91)	3–16–1
21	W	November 14, 1990	5–3	Washington Capitals (1990–91)	4–16–1
22	L	November 17, 1990	4–8	Detroit Red Wings (1990–91)	4–17–1
23	L	November 19, 1990	2–5	Boston Bruins (1990–91)	4–18–1
24	L	November 21, 1990	3–5	@ Washington Capitals (1990–91)	4–19–1
25	L	November 23, 1990	1–4	@ Philadelphia Flyers (1990–91)	4–20–1
26	L	November 24, 1990	1–4	Edmonton Oilers (1990–91)	4–21–1
27	W	November 27, 1990	4–3 OT	@ St. Louis Blues (1990–91)	5–21–1
28	L	November 29, 1990	1–2	@ Vancouver Canucks (1990–91)	5–22–1

December

Game	Result	Date	Score	Opponent	Record
29	W	December 1, 1990	4–3	@ Los Angeles Kings (1990–91)	6–22–1
30	L	December 5, 1990	2–3	Minnesota North Stars (1990–91)	6–23–1
31	W	December 6, 1990	2–1 OT	@ Minnesota North Stars (1990–91)	7–23–1
32	L	December 8, 1990	1–2	Chicago Blackhawks (1990–91)	7–24–1
33	W	December 12, 1990	4–1	Montreal Canadiens (1990–91)	8–24–1
34	L	December 15, 1990	2–4	St. Louis Blues (1990–91)	8–25–1
35	T	December 18, 1990	2–2 OT	@ New York Islanders (1990–91)	8–25–2
36	W	December 19, 1990	4–1	@ New York Rangers (1990–91)	9–25–2
37	W	December 22, 1990	5–2	@ Washington Capitals (1990–91)	10–25–2
38	L	December 23, 1990	2–4	@ New Jersey Devils (1990–91)	10–26–2
39	W	December 27, 1990	6–4	St. Louis Blues (1990–91)	11–26–2
40	W	December 29, 1990	6–3	Pittsburgh Penguins (1990–91)	12–26–2

January

Game	Result	Date	Score	Opponent	Record
41	T	January 3, 1991	3–3 OT	@ Minnesota North Stars (1990–91)	12–26–3
42	L	January 5, 1991	2–4	Los Angeles Kings (1990–91)	12–27–3
43	L	January 8, 1991	3–5	Calgary Flames (1990–91)	12–28–3
44	L	January 10, 1991	2–7	@ Chicago Blackhawks (1990–91)	12–29–3
45	T	January 12, 1991	2–2 OT	Hartford Whalers (1990–91)	12–29–4
46	L	January 14, 1991	3–9	Buffalo Sabres (1990–91)	12–30–4
47	L	January 17, 1991	5–6 OT	Pittsburgh Penguins (1990–91)	12–31–4
48	T	January 22, 1991	4–4 OT	@ Quebec Nordiques (1990–91)	12–31–5
49	L	January 23, 1991	3–7	@ Montreal Canadiens (1990–91)	12–32–5
50	L	January 26, 1991	1–5	@ Chicago Blackhawks (1990–91)	12–33–5
51	W	January 28, 1991	4–0	Minnesota North Stars (1990–91)	13–33–5

February

Game	Result	Date	Score	Opponent	Record
52	L	February 1, 1991	1–4	@ Detroit Red Wings (1990–91)	13–34–5
53	L	February 2, 1991	2–5	Detroit Red Wings (1990–91)	13–35–5
54	W	February 4, 1991	6–5 OT	St. Louis Blues (1990–91)	14–35–5
55	T	February 6, 1991	5–5 OT	@ Winnipeg Jets (1990–91)	14–35–6
56	L	February 7, 1991	2–4	@ Minnesota North Stars (1990–91)	14–36–6
57	W	February 9, 1991	3–2	New York Islanders (1990–91)	15–36–6
58	L	February 13, 1991	3–6	Philadelphia Flyers (1990–91)	15–37–6
59	W	February 16, 1991	3–2	Edmonton Oilers (1990–91)	16–37–6
60	W	February 17, 1991	3–0	@ Buffalo Sabres (1990–91)	17–37–6
61	L	February 19, 1991	2–3	@ St. Louis Blues (1990–91)	17–38–6
62	L	February 21, 1991	4–11	@ Pittsburgh Penguins (1990–91)	17–39–6
63	T	February 23, 1991	3–3 OT	@ Montreal Canadiens (1990–91)	17–39–7
64	L	February 25, 1991	4–5 OT	@ Detroit Red Wings (1990–91)	17–40–7
65	W	February 27, 1991	7–3	New Jersey Devils (1990–91)	18–40–7

March

Game	Result	Date	Score	Opponent	Record
66	L	March 2, 1991	2–5	New York Rangers (1990–91)	18–41–7
67	T	March 3, 1991	4–4 OT	@ Hartford Whalers (1990–91)	18–41–8
68	W	March 5, 1991	6–3	Boston Bruins (1990–91)	19–41–8
69	T	March 7, 1991	3–3 OT	Vancouver Canucks (1990–91)	19–41–9
70	L	March 9, 1991	0–2	@ Boston Bruins (1990–91)	19–42–9
71	W	March 12, 1991	4–3	@ Quebec Nordiques (1990–91)	20–42–9
72	L	March 13, 1991	2–3	@ New Jersey Devils (1990–91)	20–43–9
73	W	March 16, 1991	4–3 OT	Minnesota North Stars (1990–91)	21–43–9
74	L	March 17, 1991	3–4	@ Minnesota North Stars (1990–91)	21–44–9
75	T	March 20, 1991	4–4 OT	@ Los Angeles Kings (1990–91)	21–44–10
76	W	March 22, 1991	3–1	@ Detroit Red Wings (1990–91)	22–44–10
77	W	March 23, 1991	4–1	Detroit Red Wings (1990–91)	23–44–10
78	T	March 26, 1991	2–2 OT	Chicago Blackhawks (1990–91)	23–44–11
79	L	March 28, 1991	3–5	@ Chicago Blackhawks (1990–91)	23–45–11
80	L	March 30, 1991	2–5	@ St. Louis Blues (1990–91)	23–46–11

Legend: Win (2 points) Loss (0 points) Tie (1 point)

== Player statistics ==
=== Regular season ===
Scoring

Player	Pos	GP	G	A	Pts	PIM	+/-	PPG	SHG	GWG
Vincent Damphousse	C	79	26	47	73	65	-31	10	1	4
Mike Krushelnyski	LW/C	59	17	22	39	48	-6	2	2	1
Dave Ellett	D	60	8	30	38	69	-4	5	0	1
Rob Ramage	D	80	10	25	35	173	2	5	0	2
Wendel Clark	LW/D	63	18	16	34	152	-5	4	0	2
Dave Hannan	C	74	11	23	34	82	-9	0	1	2
Daniel Marois	RW	78	21	9	30	112	-16	6	0	1
Gary Leeman	RW	52	17	12	29	39	-25	4	0	1
Dave Reid	LW	69	15	13	28	18	-10	1	8	0
Peter Zezel	C	32	14	14	28	4	-7	6	0	5
Michel Petit	D	54	9	19	28	132	-19	3	1	2
Todd Gill	D	72	2	22	24	113	-4	0	0	0
Lucien DeBlois	C	38	10	12	22	30	-4	0	1	0
Doug Shedden	C	23	8	10	18	10	2	4	0	0
Al Iafrate	D	42	3	15	18	113	-15	2	0	0
Mike Foligno	RW	37	8	7	15	65	-3	1	0	0
Paul Fenton	LW	30	5	10	15	0	-3	1	1	0
Kevin Maguire	RW	63	9	5	14	180	-10	1	0	0
Ed Olczyk	C	18	4	10	14	13	-7	0	0	0
Brian Bradley	C	26	0	11	11	20	-7	0	0	0
Aaron Broten	LW/C	27	6	4	10	32	12	0	0	1
Luke Richardson	D	78	1	9	10	238	-28	0	0	0
Tom Fergus	C	14	5	4	9	8	-5	2	0	0
Gilles Thibaudeau	C	20	2	7	9	4	-7	0	0	0
Mark Osborne	LW	18	3	3	6	4	-10	1	1	0
Rob Cimetta	W	25	2	4	6	21	-5	2	0	1
Bob Rouse	D	13	2	4	6	10	-11	1	0	0
Joe Sacco	RW	20	0	5	5	2	-5	0	0	0
Mike Millar	RW	7	2	2	4	2	-1	0	0	0
Scott Thornton	LW	33	1	3	4	30	-15	0	0	0
Alexander Godynyuk	D	18	0	3	3	16	-3	0	0	0
Tom Kurvers	D	19	0	3	3	8	-12	0	0	0
John McIntyre	C	13	0	3	3	25	0	0	0	0
Lou Franceschetti	RW	16	1	1	2	30	-2	0	0	0
Claude Loiselle	C	7	1	1	2	2	0	0	0	0
Drake Berehowsky	D	8	0	1	1	25	-6	0	0	0
Jeff Reese	G	30	0	1	1	0	0	0	0	0
Darryl Shannon	D	10	0	1	1	0	1	0	0	0
Darren Veitch	D	2	0	1	1	0	-4	0	0	0
Allan Bester	G	6	0	0	0	0	0	0	0	0
Brian Curran	D	4	0	0	0	7	-2	0	0	0
Peter Ing	G	56	0	0	0	6	0	0	0	0
Greg Johnston	RW	1	0	0	0	0	0	0	0	0
John Kordic	RW	3	0	0	0	9	0	0	0	0
Brad Marsh	D	22	0	0	0	15	-6	0	0	0
Scott Pearson	LW	12	0	0	0	20	-5	0	0	0
Damian Rhodes	G	1	0	0	0	0	0	0	0	0
Jeff Serowik	D	1	0	0	0	0	0	0	0	0

Goaltending

Player	MIN	GP	W	L	T	GA	GAA	SO	SA	SV	SV%
Peter Ing	3126	56	16	29	8	200	3.84	1	1716	1516	.883
Jeff Reese	1430	30	6	13	3	92	3.86	1	695	603	.868
Damian Rhodes	60	1	1	0	0	1	1.00	0	26	25	.962
Allan Bester	247	6	0	4	0	18	4.37	0	129	111	.860
Team:	4863	80	23	46	11	311	3.84	2	2566	2255	.879

Note:

Pos = Position;GP = Games played; G = Goals; A = Assists; Pts = Points; PIM = Penalty minutes; +/- = Plus/minus; PPG = Power-play goals; SHG = Short-handed goals; GWG = Game-winning goals
Pos = Position;GP = Games played; Min, TOI = Minutes played; W = Wins; L = Losses; T,T/OT = Ties; OTL = Overtime losses; GA = Goals-against; GAA = Goals-against average; SO = Shutouts; SA = Shots against; SV = Shots saved;SV% = Save percentage;

== Awards and records ==
- Peter Ing, Molson Cup (Most game star selections for Toronto Maple Leafs)
- Dave Reid, NHL leader, 8 shorthanded goals

=== Milestones ===
Player is still active or individual record

Regular season
Player	Milestone	Reached
Peter Zezel	150th NHL Goal	-

== Transactions ==
The Maple Leafs were involved in the following transactions during the 1990-91 season.

=== Trades ===
August 20, 1990	To Boston Bruins Ken Hammond	To Toronto Maple Leafs Cash
November 9, 1990	To Los Angeles Kings John McIntyre	To Toronto Maple Leafs Mike Krushelnyski
November 9, 1990	To Boston Bruins Steve Bancroft	To Toronto Maple Leafs Rob Cimetta
November 10, 1990	To Winnipeg Jets Ed Olczyk; Mark Osborne	To Toronto Maple Leafs Dave Ellett; Paul Fenton
November 17, 1990	To Quebec Nordiques Scott Pearson; 2nd round pick in 1991 - Eric Lavigne; 2nd round pick in 1992 - Toumas Gronman	To Toronto Maple Leafs Michel Petit; Lucien DeBlois; Aaron Broten
December 17, 1990	To Buffalo Sabres Lou Franceschetti; Brian Curran	To Toronto Maple Leafs Mike Foligno; 8th round pick in 1991 - Tomas Kucharcik
January 12, 1991	To Vancouver Canucks Tom Kurvers	To Toronto Maple Leafs Brian Bradley
January 16, 1991	To Washington Capitals Al Iafrate	To Toronto Maple Leafs Peter Zezel; Bob Rouse
January 22, 1991	To Vancouver Canucks Brian Blad	To Toronto Maple Leafs Todd Hawkins
January 24, 1991	To Washington Capitals Paul Fenton; John Kordic	To Toronto Maple Leafs 5th round pick in 1991 - Alexei Kudashov
February 4, 1991	To Detroit Red Wings Brad Marsh	To Toronto Maple Leafs 8th round pick in 1991 - Robb McIntyre
March 5, 1991	To Detroit Red Wings Allan Bester	To Toronto Maple Leafs 6th round pick in 1991 - Alexander Kuzminski
March 5, 1991	To Washington Capitals Bobby Reynolds	To Toronto Maple Leafs Rob Mendel
March 5, 1991	To St. Louis Blues Darren Veitch	To Toronto Maple Leafs Keith Osborne
March 5, 1991	To Quebec Nordiques 8th round pick in 1991 - Aaron Asp	To Toronto Maple Leafs Compensation of waiver claim for Claude Loiselle

=== Waivers ===
March 5, 1991	From Quebec Nordiques Claude Loiselle

=== Free agents ===
Player / Former team; Mike Millar / Boston Bruins	Player / New team; Rick Lanz / Chicago Blackhawks

== Farm team ==
- The Toronto Maple Leafs farm team was the Newmarket Saints and they were affiliated in the American Hockey League. The Saints had 26 wins, 45 losses and 9 ties. They finished 8th in the South Division and failed to qualify for the playoffs. It would be the Saints final year in Newmarket, Ontario. The franchise relocated to St. John's, Newfoundland.
