= 1990–91 Pittsburgh Penguins season =

NHL team season (1st Cup win)

1990–91 Pittsburgh Penguins
- Stanley Cup champions
- Wales Conference champions
- Patrick Division champions
- Division: 1st Patrick
- Conference: 3rd Wales
- 1990–91 record: 41–33–6
- Home record: 25–12–3
- Road record: 16–21–3
- Goals for: 342
- Goals against: 305

Team information
- General manager: Craig Patrick
- Coach: Bob Johnson
- Captain: Mario Lemieux
- Alternate captains: Paul Coffey; Bob Errey; Randy Hillier
- Arena: Civic Arena
- Average attendance: 15,927

Team leaders
- Goals: Mark Recchi and Kevin Stevens (40)
- Assists: Mark Recchi (73)
- Points: Mark Recchi (113)
- Penalty minutes: Kevin Stevens (133)
- Wins: Tom Barrasso (27)
- Goals against average: Tom Barrasso (3.59)

The 1990–91 Pittsburgh Penguins season was the Penguins 24th season in the NHL, and they were coming off of a disappointing 1989–90 season, having finished one point behind the New York Islanders for the final playoff spot in the Patrick Division, failing to qualify for post-season play for the seventh time in eight seasons. The Penguins placed first in their division, third-overall in the Wales Conference, on the way to the first-ever Stanley Cup championship for the team. Eight players and three off-ice staff members from the 1990-91 team have been elected to the Hockey Hall of Fame. This was the first of eleven consecutive playoff appearances for the Penguins.

As of 2025, the only remaining active member of the 1990–91 Pittsburgh Penguins is Jaromir Jagr. He is a member of Rytíři Kladno of the Czech Extraliga.

== Off-season ==
In the off-season, general manager Craig Patrick, who finished the previous season coaching the club, would name Bob Johnson as the new head coach of the Penguins. Patrick also named Scotty Bowman as his director of player development and recruitment. Johnson had previously been the head coach of the Calgary Flames from 1982 to 1987. The team also acquired veteran Bryan Trottier, who helped lead the New York Islanders to four-straight Stanley Cups from 1980 to 1983, to help out with his leadership abilities.

== Pre-season ==
1990–91 Preseason Game Log: 4–0–1 (home: 1–0–1; road: 3–0–0)

#	Date	Visitor	Score	Home	OT	Decision	Attendance	Record	Recap
	September 24	Los Angeles	4–1	Pittsburgh		Young	10,413		
	September 28	Pittsburgh	3–1	Minnesota		Barrasso	9,497		
	September 30	Pittsburgh	7–0	NY Islanders		Pietrangelo	9,873		

Legend: Win Loss Tie

== Regular season ==
The Penguins would begin the season without Mario Lemieux, as he would miss the first half of the season recovering from a back injury that he suffered in a game against the New York Rangers on February 14, 1990, which caused him to miss the remainder of the 1989–90 season.

Pittsburgh would begin the season slow, and in their opening 31 games, the team had a 12–16–3 record, good for 27 points, and nine points out of a playoff spot. As the season progressed, the team began playing better, had Lemieux return to the lineup, and Patrick would make some trades, acquiring defenseman Larry Murphy from the Minnesota North Stars and Scott Young from the Hartford Whalers. The Penguins eventually came into playoff contention, and on March 4, when the team had a 32–30–4 record, sitting in third place in the Division, the club pulled off a blockbuster deal with the Whalers, trading John Cullen, Zarley Zalapski, and Jeff Parker to Hartford for Ron Francis, Ulf Samuelsson, and Grant Jennings. The deal helped the Penguins finish the season off 9–3–2, and win their first ever Division championship, finishing three points ahead of the second place New York Rangers.

With Lemieux missing the majority of the season due to his back injury, Mark Recchi stepped up and had a breakout season, scoring a team-high 40 goals and 73 assists for 113 points. Kevin Stevens would tie Recchi for the team lead in goals with 40, and add 46 assists for 86 points. Rookie Jaromir Jagr had a solid season, scoring 27 goals and earning 57 points, while Lemieux recorded 19 goals and 45 points in only 26 games. Paul Coffey led the defense with 93 points in 76 games. The 342 goals the Penguins scored was the second-highest tally in the NHL, only two goals fewer than the Calgary Flames.

In goal, Tom Barrasso had the majority of playing time, winning a team high 27 games and posting a 3.59 goals against average (GAA), along with one shutout. Frank Pietrangelo appeared in 25 games, finishing with a 10–11–1 record and a 3.94 GAA.

=== Season standings ===
Patrick Division
	GP	W	L	T	GF	GA	Pts
**Pittsburgh Penguins**	80	41	33	6	342	305	88
**New York Rangers**	80	36	31	13	297	265	85
**Washington Capitals**	80	37	36	7	258	258	81
**New Jersey Devils**	80	32	33	15	272	264	79
Philadelphia Flyers	80	33	37	10	252	267	76
New York Islanders	80	25	45	10	223	290	60

Note: GP = Games played, W = Wins, L = Losses, T = Ties, Pts = Points, GF = Goals for, GA = Goals against
Note: Teams that qualified for the playoffs are highlighted in bold.

Wales Conference
R		Div	GP	W	L	T	GF	GA	Pts
**1**	**Boston Bruins**	**ADM**	**80**	**44**	**24**	**12**	**299**	**264**	**100**
**2**	**Montreal Canadiens**	**ADM**	**80**	**39**	**30**	**11**	**273**	**249**	**89**
**3**	**Pittsburgh Penguins**	**PTK**	**80**	**41**	**33**	**6**	**342**	**305**	**88**
**4**	**New York Rangers**	**PTK**	**80**	**36**	**31**	**13**	**297**	**265**	**85**
**5**	**Washington Capitals**	**PTK**	**80**	**37**	**36**	**7**	**258**	**258**	**81**
**6**	**Buffalo Sabres**	**ADM**	**80**	**31**	**30**	**19**	**292**	**278**	**81**
**7**	**New Jersey Devils**	**PTK**	**80**	**32**	**33**	**15**	**272**	**264**	**79**
8	Philadelphia Flyers	PTK	80	33	37	10	252	267	76
**9**	**Hartford Whalers**	**ADM**	**80**	**31**	**38**	**11**	**238**	**276**	**73**
10	New York Islanders	PTK	80	25	45	10	223	290	60
11	Quebec Nordiques	ADM	80	16	50	14	236	354	46

Divisions: PTK – Patrick, ADM – Adams

bold – Qualified for playoffs

== Schedule and results ==
1990–91 regular season
October: 6–6–1 (home: 3–3–0; road: 3–3–1), 13 points

#	Oct	Time (ET)	Visitor	Score	Home	Location	Record	Points
1	5	8:05 pm	Pittsburgh Penguins	7–4	Washington Capitals	Capital Centre	1–0–0	2
2	7	7:35 pm	New Jersey Devils	4–7	Pittsburgh Penguins	Civic Arena	2–0–0	4
3	9	8:35 pm	Pittsburgh Penguins	3–4	St. Louis Blues	St. Louis Arena	2–1–0	4
4	11	8:35 pm	Pittsburgh Penguins	1–4	Chicago Blackhawks	Chicago Stadium	2–2–0	4
5	13	7:35 pm	Pittsburgh Penguins	6–4	New York Islanders	Nassau Veterans Memorial Coliseum	3–2–0	6
6	16	7:35 pm	Philadelphia Flyers	5–1	Pittsburgh Penguins	Civic Arena	3–3–0	6
7	19	7:35 pm	Pittsburgh Penguins	4–4 OT	Buffalo Sabres	Buffalo Memorial Auditorium	3–3–1	7
8	20	7:35 pm	New York Rangers	4–3	Pittsburgh Penguins	Civic Arena	3–4–1	7
9	23	7:35 pm	Montreal Canadiens	5–4	Pittsburgh Penguins	Civic Arena	3–5–1	7
10	25	7:35 pm	Quebec Nordiques	3–6	Pittsburgh Penguins	Civic Arena	4–5–1	9
11	27	7:45 pm	Pittsburgh Penguins	5–7	New Jersey Devils	Brendan Byrne Arena	4–6–1	9
12	28	7:35 pm	New York Islanders	3–8	Pittsburgh Penguins	Civic Arena	5–6–1	11
13	30	7:35 pm	Pittsburgh Penguins	6–2	Philadelphia Flyers	The Spectrum	6–6–1	13

November: 5–6–1 (home: 3–4–0; road: 2–2–1), 11 points

#	Nov	Time (ET)	Visitor	Score	Home	Location	Record	Points
14	3	7:35 pm	New York Rangers	1–3	Pittsburgh Penguins	Civic Arena	7–6–1	15
15	6	7:35 pm	Calgary Flames	5–6	Pittsburgh Penguins	Civic Arena	8–6–1	17
16	8	7:35 pm	St. Louis Blues	3–2	Pittsburgh Penguins	Civic Arena	8–7–1	17
17	10	7:05 pm	Pittsburgh Penguins	3–3 OT	Boston Bruins	Boston Garden	8–7–2	18
18	13	8:35 pm	Pittsburgh Penguins	4–1	Minnesota North Stars	Met Center	9–7–2	20
19	14	8:35 pm	Pittsburgh Penguins	6–4	Winnipeg Jets	Winnipeg Arena	10–7–2	22
20	17	10:35 pm	Pittsburgh Penguins	1–2 OT	Los Angeles Kings	Great Western Forum	10–8–2	22
21	21	7:35 pm	Philadelphia Flyers	5–4	Pittsburgh Penguins	Civic Arena	10–9–2	22
22	23	8:05 pm	Pittsburgh Penguins	3–7	Washington Capitals	Capital Centre	10–10–2	22
23	24	7:35 pm	Washington Capitals	2–3 OT	Pittsburgh Penguins	Civic Arena	11–10–2	24
24	27	7:35 pm	Edmonton Oilers	7–3	Pittsburgh Penguins	Civic Arena	11–11–2	24
25	29	7:35 pm	Hartford Whalers	6–4	Pittsburgh Penguins	Civic Arena	11–12–2	24

December: 10–6–1 (home: 6–3–1; road: 4–3–0), 21 points

#	Dec	Time (ET)	Visitor	Score	Home	Location	Record	Points
26	1	8:35 pm	Pittsburgh Penguins	3–6	Minnesota North Stars	Met Center	11–13–2	24
27	3	7:35 pm	Pittsburgh Penguins	9–4	New York Rangers	Madison Square Garden (IV)	12–13–2	26
28	5	7:35 pm	Washington Capitals	3–1	Pittsburgh Penguins	Civic Arena	12–14–2	26
29	7	7:35 pm	Vancouver Canucks	2–2 OT	Pittsburgh Penguins	Civic Arena	12–14–3	27
30	8	7:35 pm	Pittsburgh Penguins	1–3	Hartford Whalers	Hartford Civic Center	12–15–3	27
31	11	7:35 pm	Chicago Blackhawks	4–1	Pittsburgh Penguins	Civic Arena	12–16–3	27
32	13	7:35 pm	New Jersey Devils	5–9	Pittsburgh Penguins	Civic Arena	13–16–3	29
33	14	7:35 pm	Pittsburgh Penguins	4–3	Buffalo Sabres	Buffalo Memorial Auditorium	14–16–3	31
34	16	7:35 pm	Detroit Red Wings	1–4	Pittsburgh Penguins	Civic Arena	15–16–3	33
35	18	7:35 pm	Winnipeg Jets	2–9	Pittsburgh Penguins	Civic Arena	16–16–3	35
36	20	7:35 pm	Minnesota North Stars	3–4	Pittsburgh Penguins	Civic Arena	17–16–3	37
37	22	7:35 pm	Pittsburgh Penguins	4–3	New York Islanders	Nassau Veterans Memorial Coliseum	18–16–3	39
38	23	7:35 pm	New York Islanders	4–3 OT	Pittsburgh Penguins	Civic Arena	18–17–3	39
39	26	7:35 pm	Pittsburgh Penguins	7–3	Washington Capitals	Capital Centre	19–17–3	41
40	28	7:35 pm	Detroit Red Wings	0–5	Pittsburgh Penguins	Civic Arena	20–17–3	43
41	29	8:05 pm	Pittsburgh Penguins	3–6	Toronto Maple Leafs	Maple Leaf Gardens	20–18–3	43
42	31	6:05 pm	St. Louis Blues	3–4	Pittsburgh Penguins	Civic Arena	21–18–3	45

January: 7–4–0 (home: 5–1–0; road: 2–3–0), 14 points

#	Jan	Time (ET)	Visitor	Score	Home	Location	Record	Points
43	3	7:35 pm	New York Rangers	7–5	Pittsburgh Penguins	Civic Arena	21–19–3	45
44	5	1:35 pm	New Jersey Devils	2–5	Pittsburgh Penguins	Civic Arena	22–19–3	47
45	6	7:05 pm	Pittsburgh Penguins	3–6	Montreal Canadiens	Montreal Forum	22–20–3	47
46	8	7:35 pm	Edmonton Oilers	1–6	Pittsburgh Penguins	Civic Arena	23–20–3	49
47	10	7:35 pm	Calgary Flames	1–5	Pittsburgh Penguins	Civic Arena	24–20–3	51
48	15	7:35 pm	Pittsburgh Penguins	4–5	Philadelphia Flyers	The Spectrum	24–21–3	51
49	17	7:35 pm	Pittsburgh Penguins	6–5 OT	Toronto Maple Leafs	Maple Leaf Gardens	25–21–3	53
50	22	7:35 pm	New Jersey Devils	3–5	Pittsburgh Penguins	Civic Arena	26–21–3	55
51	26	7:35 pm	Pittsburgh Penguins	6–5	Quebec Nordiques	Colisée de Québec	27–21–3	57
52	29	7:35 pm	Washington Capitals	2–3 OT	Pittsburgh Penguins	Civic Arena	28–21–3	59
53	31	7:35 pm	Pittsburgh Penguins	2–4	Philadelphia Flyers	The Spectrum	28–22–3	59

February: 4–7–1 (home: 4–0–0; road: 0–7–1), 9 points

#	Feb	Time (ET)	Visitor	Score	Home	Location	Record	Points
54	2	1:35 pm	Boston Bruins	2–6	Pittsburgh Penguins	Civic Arena	29–22–3	61
55	3	7:05 pm	Pittsburgh Penguins	3–6	Boston Bruins	Boston Garden	29–23–3	61
56	8	8:35 pm	Pittsburgh Penguins	2–6	Winnipeg Jets	Winnipeg Arena	29–24–3	61
57	11	9:35 pm	Pittsburgh Penguins	5–7	Edmonton Oilers	Northlands Coliseum	29–25–3	61
58	14	7:35 pm	New York Islanders	2–5	Pittsburgh Penguins	Civic Arena	30–25–3	63
59	16	7:35 pm	Pittsburgh Penguins	3–4	New York Islanders	Nassau Veterans Memorial Coliseum	30–26–3	63
60	19	7:35 pm	Buffalo Sabres	3–6	Pittsburgh Penguins	Civic Arena	31–26–3	65
61	21	7:35 pm	Toronto Maple Leafs	4–11	Pittsburgh Penguins	Civic Arena	32–26–3	67
62	22	7:45 pm	Pittsburgh Penguins	2–5	New Jersey Devils	Brendan Byrne Arena	32–27–3	67
63	24	1:35 pm	Pittsburgh Penguins	5–5 OT	Washington Capitals	Capital Centre	32–27–4	68
64	26	10:35 pm	Pittsburgh Penguins	2–8	Los Angeles Kings	Great Western Forum	32–28–4	68
65	27	10:35 pm	Pittsburgh Penguins	3–4	Vancouver Canucks	Pacific Coliseum	32–29–4	68

March: 9–4–2 (home: 4–1–2; road: 5–3–0), 20 points

#	Mar	Time (ET)	Visitor	Score	Home	Location	Record	Points
66	1	9:35 pm	Pittsburgh Penguins	2–6	Calgary Flames	Olympic Saddledome	32–30–4	68
67	5	7:35 pm	Vancouver Canucks	1–4	Pittsburgh Penguins	Civic Arena	33–30–4	70
68	7	7:35 pm	Los Angeles Kings	2–3	Pittsburgh Penguins	Civic Arena	34–30–4	72
69	9	7:35 pm	Pittsburgh Penguins	5–2	Hartford Whalers	Hartford Civic Center	35–30–4	74
70	10	5:05 pm	Pittsburgh Penguins	4–3	New York Islanders	Nassau Veterans Memorial Coliseum	36–30–4	76
71	12	7:35 pm	Montreal Canadiens	4–4 OT	Pittsburgh Penguins	Civic Arena	36–30–5	77
72	16	1:35 pm	Quebec Nordiques	3–6	Pittsburgh Penguins	Civic Arena	37–30–5	79
73	17	1:35 pm	Pittsburgh Penguins	4–2	New York Rangers	Madison Square Garden (IV)	38–30–5	81
74	19	7:45 pm	Pittsburgh Penguins	4–5	New Jersey Devils	Brendan Byrne Arena	38–31–5	81
75	21	7:35 pm	New York Rangers	4–5 OT	Pittsburgh Penguins	Civic Arena	39–31–5	83
76	23	1:35 pm	Chicago Blackhawks	7–5	Pittsburgh Penguins	Civic Arena	39–32–5	83
77	26	7:35 pm	Pittsburgh Penguins	3–1	Philadelphia Flyers	The Spectrum	40–32–5	85
78	27	7:35 pm	Pittsburgh Penguins	7–4	Detroit Red Wings	Joe Louis Arena	41–32–5	87
79	30	1:35 pm	Philadelphia Flyers	4–4 OT	Pittsburgh Penguins	Civic Arena	41–32–6	88
80	31	7:35 pm	Pittsburgh Penguins	3–6	New York Rangers	Madison Square Garden (IV)	41–33–6	88

Legend: Win (2 points) Loss (0 points) Tie (1 point)

== Playoffs ==
=== Division Semifinals ===
In the playoffs, the Penguins would open up against the New Jersey Devils, who finished the year in fourth place in the Division, nine points behind Pittsburgh. The teams split the opening two games in Pittsburgh, and then split the two games in New Jersey, before the Devils won game five at Civic Arena to take a 3–2 series lead back home. The Penguins responded with a hard-fought 4–3 victory in game six to bring it back home for game seven, where Pittsburgh completed the comeback with a 4–0 shutout to win the series.

=== Division Finals ===
Up next was the Washington Capitals, and Washington would surprise the Penguins with a 4–2 victory in the opening game, though Pittsburgh tied the series in game two with a 7–6 overtime victory. The Pens would go into Washington for Games 3 and 4, and post back-to-back 3–1 wins to go up 3–1 in the series, and finish off Washington in the fifth game to clinch the series and advance to the Conference Finals for the first time in team history.

=== Conference Finals ===
The Penguins next opponent was the Boston Bruins, the defending Wales Conference champions, and the Bruins, who finished with 100 points, had home ice for the series. Boston would take control of the series early by winning the opening two games in Boston, however, the Penguins responded by winning the next two in Pittsburgh to even up the series. Pittsburgh would return to Boston for the fifth game, and surprise the Bruins with a 7–2 victory, going up 3–2 in the series and returning home for the sixth game. The Penguins finished off Boston 5–3 in the sixth game, winning the Prince of Wales Trophy and going to the Stanley Cup finals for the first time in team history.

=== Stanley Cup Final ===
Pittsburgh faced the surprising Minnesota North Stars in the Stanley Cup Final. While the North Stars had a 27–39–14 record during the regular season, they had been red hot in the playoffs, defeating the Presidents' Trophy winners Chicago Blackhawks, the St. Louis Blues and the defending Stanley Cup champion Edmonton Oilers to reach the Finals. Minnesota would continue their hot streak with a 5–4 victory in game one, but the Penguins tied the series in game two as the series shifted from Pittsburgh to Minnesota. The North Stars won game three with solid goaltending, but the Penguins rebounded in game four to tie the series as it returned to Pittsburgh. Game five was a close, hard-fought game, with the Penguins winning 6–4 to take a 3–2 series lead, and in game six, Pittsburgh would defeat the North Stars 8–0 to win the series, and the first-ever Stanley Cup in club history. Mario Lemieux, recording 44 points in 23 games, won the Conn Smythe Trophy as playoff MVP.

=== Playoff log ===
1991 Stanley Cup playoffs
Patrick Division semi-finals vs No. 4 New Jersey Devils: 4–3 (home: 2–2; road: 2–1)

#	Date	Visitor	Score	Home	OT	PIT goals	NJ goals	Decision	Attendance	Series	Recap
1	April 3	New Jersey	3–1	Pittsburgh		Lemieux	Šťastný (2), Boschman	Barrasso (0–1)	16,164	0–1	
2	April 5	New Jersey	4–5	Pittsburgh	8:52	Stevens, Coffey, Bourque, Loney, Jagr	MacLean (2), Shanahan, Kasatonov	Barrasso (1–1)	16,164	1–1	
3	April 7	Pittsburgh	4–3	New Jersey		Recchi, Errey, Mullen, Recchi	Shanahan (2), Brown	Barrasso (2–1)	16,899	2–1	
4	April 9	Pittsburgh	1–4	New Jersey		Lemieux	Lemieux, Šťastný, MacLean, Lemieux	Barrasso (2–2)	16,552	2–2	
5	April 11	New Jersey	4–2	Pittsburgh		Francis, Murphy	MacLean, Driver, Lemieux, Brown (en)	Barrasso (2–3)	16,164	2–3	
6	April 13	Pittsburgh	4–3	New Jersey		Stevens (2), Jagr, Francis	MacLean, Weinrich, Lemieux	Pietrangelo (1–0)	19,040	3–3	
7	April 15	New Jersey	0–4	Pittsburgh		Hrdina, Lemieux, Hrdina, Coffey		Pietrangelo (2-0)	16,164	4–3	

Patrick Division finals vs No. 3 Washington Capitals: 4–1 (home: 2–1; road: 2–0)

#	Date	Visitor	Score	Home	OT	PIT goals	WSH goals	Decision	Attendance	Series	Recap
1	April 17	Washington	4–2	Pittsburgh		Murphy, Lemieux	Johansson, Hatcher, Iafrate, Miller (en)	Pietrangelo (1–2)	16,164	0–1	
2	April 19	Washington	6–7	Pittsburgh	9:10	Bourque, Mullen, Recchi (2), Stevens, Gilhen, Stevens	Hunter, Druce, Ridley, Ciccarelli (2), Johansson	Pietrangelo (2–2)	16,164	1–1	
3	April 21	Pittsburgh	3–1	Washington		Lemieux, Stevens, Trottier	Ciccarelli	Barrasso (3–3)	18,130	2–1	
4	April 23	Pittsburgh	3–1	Washington		Recchi, Stevens, Bourque	Bergland	Barrasso (4–3)	17,867	3–1	
5	April 25	Washington	1–4	Pittsburgh		Mullen, Francis, Jagr, Recchi (en)	Tippett	Barrasso (5–3)	16,164	4–1	

Wales Conference finals vs No. 1 Boston Bruins: 4–2 (home: 3–0; road: 1–2)

#	Date	Visitor	Score	Home	OT	PIT goals	BOS goals	Decision	Attendance	Series	Recap
1	May 1	Pittsburgh	3–6	Boston		Mullen, Stevens, Errey	Janney, Neely, Sweeney, Neely, Christian, Bourque	Barrasso (5–4)	14,448	0–1	
2	May 3	Pittsburgh	4–5	Boston	8:14	Stevens, Lemieux, Recchi, Lemieux	Neely, Wesley, Bourque, Janney, Ruzicka	Barrasso (5–5)	14,448	0–2	
3	May 5	Boston	1–4	Pittsburgh		Stevens, Francis, Jennings, Lemieux	Bourque	Barrasso (6–5)	16,164	1–2	
4	May 7	Boston	1–4	Pittsburgh		Errey, Mullen, Lemieux, Stevens	Christian	Barrasso (7–5)	16,164	2–2	
5	May 9	Pittsburgh	7–2	Boston		Stevens, Lemieux, Trottier, Stevens, Stanton, Murphy, Samuelsson	Sweeney, Janney	Barrasso (8–5)	14,448	3–2	
6	May 11	Boston	3–5	Pittsburgh		Murphy, Bourque, Roberts, Recchi, Lemieux (en)	Neely, Hodge, Jr., Sweeney	Barrasso (9–5)	16,164	4–2	

Stanley Cup Final vs No. 4 Minnesota North Stars: 4–2 (home: 2–1; road: 2–1)

#	Date	Visitor	Score	Home	OT	PIT goals	MIN goals	Decision	Attendance	Series	Recap
1	May 15	Minnesota	5–4	Pittsburgh		Samuelsson, Lemieux, Young, Mullen	Broten, Dahlen, Bureau, Broten, Smith	Barrasso (9–6)	16,164	0–1	
2	May 17	Minnesota	1–4	Pittsburgh		Errey, Stevens, Lemieux, Stevens	Modano	Barrasso (10–6)	16,164	1–1	
3	May 19	Pittsburgh	1–3	Minnesota		Bourque	Gagner, Smith, Duchesne	Barrasso (10–7)	15,378	1–2	
4	May 21	Pittsburgh	5–3	Minnesota		Stevens, Francis, Lemieux, Trottier, Bourque (en)	Gagner, Propp, Modano	Barrasso (11–7)	15,378	2–2	
5	May 23	Minnesota	4–6	Pittsburgh		Lemieux, Stevens, Recchi (2), Francis, Loney	Broten, Gagner, Dahlen, Gagner	Pietrangelo (3–2)	16,164	3–2	
6	May 25	Pittsburgh	8–0	Minnesota		Samuelsson, Lemieux, Mullen, Errey, Francis, Mullen, Paek, Murphy		Barrasso (11–7)	15,378	4–2	

Legend: Win Loss

- Scorer of game-winning goal in italics

== Player statistics ==
Skaters

Regular season
Player	GP	G	A	Pts	+/−	PIM
Mark Recchi	78	40	73	113	0	48
John Cullen^{‡}	65	31	63	94	0	83
Paul Coffey	76	24	69	93	–18	128
Kevin Stevens	80	40	46	86	–1	133
Jaromir Jagr	80	27	30	57	–4	42
Zarley Zalapski^{‡}	66	12	36	48	15	59
Mario Lemieux	26	19	26	45	8	30
Bob Errey	79	20	22	42	11	115
Joe Mullen	47	17	22	39	9	6
Phil Bourque	78	20	14	34	7	106
Bryan Trottier	52	9	19	28	5	24
Larry Murphy^{†}	44	5	23	28	2	30
Scott Young^{†}	43	11	16	27	3	33
Randy Gilhen	72	15	10	25	3	51
Paul Stanton	75	5	18	23	11	40
Jiri Hrdina^{†}	37	6	14	20	–2	13
Tony Tanti^{‡}	46	6	12	18	1	44
Rob Brown^{‡}	25	6	10	16	0	31
Troy Loney	44	7	9	16	10	85
Gordie Roberts^{†}	61	3	12	15	18	70
Barry Pederson	46	6	8	14	2	21
Peter Taglianetti^{†}	39	3	8	11	16	93
Ron Francis^{†}	14	2	9	11	0	21
Jim Johnson^{‡}	24	0	5	5	–3	23
Ulf Samuelsson^{†}	14	1	4	5	4	37
Grant Jennings^{†}	13	1	3	4	2	26
Randy Hillier	31	2	2	4	–3	32
Chris Dahlquist^{‡}	22	1	2	3	0	30
Jay Caufield	23	1	1	2	–2	71
Jamie Leach	7	2	0	2	–1	0
Jeff Daniels	11	0	2	2	0	2
Brad Aitken^{‡}	6	0	1	1	–2	25
Ken Priestlay	2	0	1	1	0	0
Jim Paek	3	0	0	0	2	9
Gord Dineen	9	0	0	0	–4	6
Jim Kyte^{‡}	1	0	0	0	0	2
Total		342	590	932	–	1,569

Playoffs
Player	GP	G	A	Pts	+/−	PIM
Mario Lemieux	23	16	28	44	14	16
Mark Recchi	24	10	24	34	6	33
Kevin Stevens	24	17	16	33	14	53
Larry Murphy	23	5	18	23	17	44
Ron Francis	24	7	10	17	13	24
Joe Mullen	22	8	9	17	17	4
Jaromir Jagr	24	3	10	13	2	6
Phil Bourque	24	6	7	13	6	16
Paul Coffey	12	2	9	11	–1	6
Scott Young	17	1	6	7	1	2
Bryan Trottier	23	3	4	7	–1	49
Bob Errey	24	5	2	7	5	29
Ulf Samuelsson	20	3	2	5	7	34
Troy Loney	24	2	2	4	–3	41
Jiri Hrdina	14	2	2	4	1	6
Gordie Roberts	24	1	2	3	13	63
Paul Stanton	22	1	2	3	6	24
Peter Taglianetti	19	0	3	3	7	49
Grant Jennings	13	1	1	2	3	16
Randy Gilhen	16	1	0	1	–4	14
Jim Paek	8	1	0	1	2	2
Randy Hillier	8	0	0	0	1	24
Total		95	157	252	–	555

Goaltenders

Regular Season
Player	GP	TOI	W	L	T	GA	GAA	SA	SV%	SO	G	A	PIM
Tom Barrasso	48	2753:51	27	16	3	165	3.59	1579	0.896	1	0	5	40
Frank Pietrangelo	25	1310:35	10	11	1	86	3.94	714	0.880	0	0	1	24
Wendell Young	18	772:57	4	6	2	52	4.04	428	0.879	0	0	1	0
Total		4837:23	41	33	6	303	3.76	2721	0.889	1	0	7	64

Playoffs
Player	GP	TOI	W	L	T	GA	GAA	SA	SV%	SO	G	A	PIM
Tom Barrasso	20	1175:23	12	7	0	51	2.82	629	0.919	1	0	1	2
Frank Pietrangelo	5	287:42	4	1	0	15	2.80	148	0.899	1	0	1	2
Total		1463:05	16	8	0	66	2.71	777	0.915	2	0	2	4

^{†}Denotes player spent time with another team before joining the Penguins. Stats reflect time with the Penguins only.
^{‡}Denotes player was traded mid-season. Stats reflect time with the Penguins only.

== Awards and records ==
- Mario Lemieux became the first person to score 500 assists for the Penguins. He did so in a 5–7 loss to Edmonton on February 11.
- Paul Coffey established a franchise record for assists (278) and points (376) by a defenseman. He broke the previous records of 277 assists and 343 points, both held by Ron Stackhouse.

=== Awards ===
Player	Award
Phil Bourque	Baz Bastien Memorial "Good Guy" Award
Randy Gilhen	Unsung Hero Award
Jaromir Jagr	Michel Briere Memorial Rookie of the Year Award; NHL All-Rookie team
Mario Lemieux	Donadeo Sullivan Pittsburgh Penguins Masterton Nominee; Conn Smythe Trophy
Mark Recchi	Bowser Pontiac Leading Point Scorer Award; Murray Hill Jewelers Player's Player Award; Booster Club Award; Foodland Most Valuable Player Award
Kevin Stevens	NHL second All-Star team

== Transactions ==
The Penguins were involved in the following transactions during the 1990–91 season:

=== Trades ===
June 16, 1990	To Calgary Flames: 1990 second-round pick (#26–Nicolas Perreault)	To Pittsburgh Penguins: Joe Mullen
October 27, 1990	To St. Louis Blues: Future considerations (1992 eleventh-round pick (#259–Wade Salzman))	To Pittsburgh Penguins: Gordie Roberts
December 11, 1990	To Minnesota North Stars: Jim Johnson; Chris Dahlquist	To Pittsburgh Penguins: Larry Murphy; Peter Taglianetti
December 13, 1990	To Calgary Flames: Jim Kyte	To Pittsburgh Penguins: Jiri Hrdina
December 21, 1990	To Hartford Whalers: Rob Brown	To Pittsburgh Penguins: Scott Young
March 4, 1991	To Hartford Whalers: John Cullen; Zarley Zalapski; Jeff Parker	To Pittsburgh Penguins: Ron Francis; Ulf Samuelsson; Grant Jennings
March 5, 1991	To Edmonton Oilers: Brad Aitken	To Pittsburgh Penguins: Kim Issel
March 5, 1991	To Buffalo Sabres: Tony Tanti	To Pittsburgh Penguins: Rights to Ken Priestlay

=== Free agents ===
Player	Acquired from	Lost to	Date
Alain Chevrier		Detroit Red Wings	July 5, 1990
Bryan Trottier	New York Islanders		July 20, 1990
Richard Zemlak		Calgary Flames	November 9, 1990
Jeff Parker	Winnipeg Jets		February 5, 1991

=== Signings ===
Player	Date	Contract terms
Paul Coffey	October 24, 1990	Multi-year contract

=== Other ===
Name	Date	Details
Rod Buskas	October 1, 1990	Lost to Los Angeles Kings in waiver draft
Randy Gilhen	May 30, 1991	Lost in expansion draft (Minnesota North Stars)
Greg Carval	June 21, 1991	Acquired in supplemental draft

== Draft picks ==
Pittsburgh Penguins' picks at the 1990 NHL entry draft.

Round	#	Player	Pos	Nationality	College/Junior/Club team (League)
1	5	Jaromir Jagr	Right wing	Czechoslovakia	HC Kladno (Czechoslovakia)
3	61^{[a]}	Joe Dziedzic	Left wing	United States	Edison High School (USHS–MN)
4	68	Chris Tamer	Defense	United States	University of Michigan (CCHA)
5	89	Brian Farrell	Left wing	United States	Avon Old Farms (USHS–CT)
6	107^{[b]}	Ian Moran	Defense	United States	Belmont Hill School (USHS–MA)
6	110	Denis Casey	Goaltender	Canada	Colorado College (WCHA)
7	130^{[c]}	Mika Valila	Center	Sweden	Tappara (Finland)
7	131	Ken Plaquin	Defense	Canada	Michigan Tech (WCHA)
7	145^{[d]}	Patrick Neaton	Defense	United States	University of Michigan (CCHA)
8	152	Petteri Koskimaki	Center	Finland	Boston University (Hockey East)
9	173	Ladislav Karabin	Left wing	Czechoslovakia	Slovan Bratislava (Czechoslovakia)
10	194	Timothy Fingerhut	Left wing	United States	Canterbury High School (USHS–CT)
11	215	Michael Thompson	Right wing	Canada	Michigan State University (CCHA)
12	236	Brian Bruininks	Defense	United States	Colorado College (WCHA)
S	5	Joe Dragon	Center	Canada	Cornell University (ECAC)
S	10	Savo Mitrovic	Center	Yugoslavia	University of New Hampshire (Hockey East)

Draft notes

- The Pittsburgh Penguins' second-round pick went to the Calgary Flames as the result of a June 16, 1990, trade that sent Joe Mullen to the Penguins in exchange for this pick.
- The Pittsburgh Penguins' third-round pick went to the Philadelphia Flyers as the result of a September 1, 1989, trade that sent Wendell Young and a seventh-round pick to the Penguins in exchange for this pick.
- ^{a} The Buffalo Sabres' third-round pick went to the Pittsburgh Penguins as a result of a November 12, 1988, trade that sent Doug Bodger and Darrin Shannon to the Sabres in exchange for Tom Barrasso and this pick.
- ^{b} The Vancouver Canucks' sixth-round pick went to the Pittsburgh Penguins as a result of an October 24, 1989, trade that sent Rod Buskas to the Canucks in exchange for this pick.
- ^{c} The Philadelphia Flyers' seventh-round pick went to the Pittsburgh Penguins as a result of a September 1, 1989, trade that sent a third-round pick to the Flyers in exchange for Wendell Young and this pick.
- ^{d} The Buffalo Sabres' seventh-round pick went to the Pittsburgh Penguins as a result of an October 3, 1988, trade that sent Wayne Van Dorp to the Sabres in exchange for this pick.

== Farm teams ==
The IHL's Muskegon Lumberjacks finished in fourth place in the East Division with a record of 38-40-5. They lost to the Kalamazoo Wings in the first round of the playoffs 4-1.

The East Coast Hockey League's Knoxville Cherokees won the Henry Brabham Cup as the team with the league's most outstanding record (46-13-5). They were swept in the first round of the playoffs by the Louisville Icehawks. Don Jackson was named coach of the year, Stan Drulia was named league MVP and was leading scorer, and Dan Gauthier was the league rookie of the year.

== Media affiliates ==
Radio

Flagship station	Play-by-play	Color commentator	Studio host
KDKA AM 1020 (main); WDVE-FM 102.5 (backup)	Mike Lange	Paul Steigerwald	

Some of the games broadcast on WDVE because of KDKA's broadcast conflict with the Pittsburgh Pirates.

Television

Local TV	Play-by-play	Color commentator
KDKA-TV 2 KBL	Mike Lange	Paul Steigerwald
