= 1990–91 Detroit Red Wings season =

National Hockey League team season

1990–91 Detroit Red Wings
- Division: 3rd Norris
- Conference: 6th Campbell
- 1990–91 record: 34–38–8
- Home record: 26–14–0
- Road record: 8–24–8
- Goals for: 273
- Goals against: 298

Team information
- General manager: Bryan Murray
- Coach: Bryan Murray
- Captain: Steve Yzerman
- Alternate captains: Gerard Gallant; Bob Probert; Rick Zombo
- Arena: Joe Louis Arena

Team leaders
- Goals: Steve Yzerman (51)
- Assists: Steve Yzerman (57)
- Points: Steve Yzerman (108)
- Penalty minutes: Bob Probert (315)
- Wins: Tim Cheveldae (30)
- Goals against average: Glen Hanlon (3.20)

The 1990–91 Detroit Red Wings season saw the team return to the playoffs after missing the previous season, despite winning only thirty-four games. Until the 2016–17 season, this was the Red Wings' last losing season, who were to set a National Hockey League record for the most consecutive winning seasons during the following two decades.

== Regular season ==
=== Final standings ===
Norris Division
	GP	W	L	T	GF	GA	Pts
**Chicago Blackhawks**	80	49	23	8	284	211	106
**St. Louis Blues**	80	47	22	11	310	250	105
**Detroit Red Wings**	80	34	38	8	273	298	76
**Minnesota North Stars**	80	27	39	14	256	266	68
Toronto Maple Leafs	80	23	46	11	241	318	57

Note: GP = Games played, W = Wins, L = Losses, T = Ties, Pts = Points, GF = Goals for, GA = Goals against
Note: Teams that qualified for the playoffs are highlighted in bold.

Campbell Conference
R		Div	GP	W	L	T	GF	GA	Pts
**1**	**p – Chicago Blackhawks**	**NRS**	**80**	**49**	**23**	**8**	**284**	**211**	**106**
**2**	**St. Louis Blues**	**NRS**	**80**	**47**	**22**	**11**	**310**	**250**	**105**
**3**	**Los Angeles Kings**	**SMY**	**80**	**46**	**24**	**10**	**340**	**254**	**102**
**4**	**Calgary Flames**	**SMY**	**80**	**46**	**26**	**8**	**344**	**263**	**100**
**5**	**Edmonton Oilers**	**SMY**	**80**	**37**	**37**	**6**	**272**	**272**	**80**
**6**	**Detroit Red Wings**	**NRS**	**80**	**34**	**38**	**8**	**273**	**298**	**76**
**7**	**Minnesota North Stars**	**NRS**	**80**	**27**	**39**	**14**	**256**	**266**	**68**
**8**	**Vancouver Canucks**	**SMY**	**80**	**28**	**43**	**9**	**243**	**315**	**65**
9	Winnipeg Jets	SMY	80	26	43	11	260	288	63
10	Toronto Maple Leafs	NRS	80	23	46	11	241	318	57

Divisions: NRS – Norris, SMY – Smythe

bold – Qualified for playoffs; p – Won Presidents' Trophy

== Schedule and results ==
1990–91 regular season
October

Game	Result	Date	Score	Opponent	Record
1	T	October 4, 1990	3–3 OT	@ New Jersey Devils (1990–91)	0–0–1
2	L	October 6, 1990	4–6	@ Washington Capitals (1990–91)	0–1–1
3	L	October 7, 1990	2–7	@ Philadelphia Flyers (1990–91)	0–2–1
4	W	October 10, 1990	6–5 OT	Calgary Flames (1990–91)	1–2–1
5	W	October 12, 1990	4–2	Hartford Whalers (1990–91)	2–2–1
6	T	October 13, 1990	3–3 OT	@ Toronto Maple Leafs (1990–91)	2–2–2
7	W	October 16, 1990	3–2	Chicago Blackhawks (1990–91)	3–2–2
8	W	October 18, 1990	5–2	Montreal Canadiens (1990–91)	4–2–2
9	L	October 20, 1990	3–5	@ Quebec Nordiques (1990–91)	4–3–2
10	W	October 23, 1990	6–0	Vancouver Canucks (1990–91)	5–3–2
11	W	October 26, 1990	8–6	Minnesota North Stars (1990–91)	6–3–2
12	T	October 27, 1990	2–2 OT	@ Minnesota North Stars (1990–91)	6–3–3
13	L	October 30, 1990	2–5	St. Louis Blues (1990–91)	6–4–3

November

Game	Result	Date	Score	Opponent	Record
14	W	November 1, 1990	5–4	Toronto Maple Leafs (1990–91)	7–4–3
15	L	November 3, 1990	2–5	@ Montreal Canadiens (1990–91)	7–5–3
16	L	November 6, 1990	3–6	@ Vancouver Canucks (1990–91)	7–6–3
17	L	November 8, 1990	1–5	@ Los Angeles Kings (1990–91)	7–7–3
18	L	November 10, 1990	1–6	@ St. Louis Blues (1990–91)	7–8–3
19	L	November 14, 1990	2–3	Chicago Blackhawks (1990–91)	7–9–3
20	W	November 17, 1990	8–4	@ Toronto Maple Leafs (1990–91)	8–9–3
21	L	November 19, 1990	2–3 OT	Washington Capitals (1990–91)	8–10–3
22	W	November 21, 1990	4–3	Minnesota North Stars (1990–91)	9–10–3
23	W	November 23, 1990	5–3	St. Louis Blues (1990–91)	10–10–3
24	W	November 27, 1990	4–3	Los Angeles Kings (1990–91)	11–10–3
25	W	November 29, 1990	5–1	@ Chicago Blackhawks (1990–91)	12–10–3

December

Game	Result	Date	Score	Opponent	Record
26	W	December 1, 1990	4–3	Chicago Blackhawks (1990–91)	13–10–3
27	T	December 2, 1990	3–3 OT	@ Buffalo Sabres (1990–91)	13–10–4
28	L	December 4, 1990	4–5 OT	Boston Bruins (1990–91)	13–11–4
29	L	December 7, 1990	3–6	St. Louis Blues (1990–91)	13–12–4
30	L	December 8, 1990	1–2	@ St. Louis Blues (1990–91)	13–13–4
31	W	December 11, 1990	8–3	Buffalo Sabres (1990–91)	14–13–4
32	W	December 13, 1990	5–2	Quebec Nordiques (1990–91)	15–13–4
33	W	December 15, 1990	3–1	@ Philadelphia Flyers (1990–91)	16–13–4
34	L	December 16, 1990	1–4	@ Pittsburgh Penguins (1990–91)	16–14–4
35	W	December 18, 1990	3–1	Philadelphia Flyers (1990–91)	17–14–4
36	W	December 20, 1990	3–1	Winnipeg Jets (1990–91)	18–14–4
37	W	December 22, 1990	5–2	@ Winnipeg Jets (1990–91)	19–14–4
38	L	December 23, 1990	2–3	@ Chicago Blackhawks (1990–91)	19–15–4
39	L	December 28, 1990	0–5	@ Pittsburgh Penguins (1990–91)	19–16–4
40	L	December 31, 1990	0–4	Chicago Blackhawks (1990–91)	19–17–4

January

Game	Result	Date	Score	Opponent	Record
41	W	January 2, 1991	6–2	Minnesota North Stars (1990–91)	20–17–4
42	L	January 4, 1991	2–3	@ Edmonton Oilers (1990–91)	20–18–4
43	L	January 5, 1991	0–7	@ Calgary Flames (1990–91)	20–19–4
44	W	January 9, 1991	5–3	Edmonton Oilers (1990–91)	21–19–4
45	W	January 11, 1991	6–3	New York Rangers (1990–91)	22–19–4
46	T	January 12, 1991	2–2 OT	@ New York Islanders (1990–91)	22–19–5
47	L	January 14, 1991	1–6	@ Boston Bruins (1990–91)	22–20–5
48	L	January 16, 1991	3–5	@ Buffalo Sabres (1990–91)	22–21–5
49	L	January 22, 1991	1–2 OT	Washington Capitals (1990–91)	22–22–5
50	L	January 25, 1991	4–9	St. Louis Blues (1990–91)	22–23–5
51	L	January 26, 1991	4–5 OT	@ St. Louis Blues (1990–91)	22–24–5
52	L	January 28, 1991	2–6	New Jersey Devils (1990–91)	22–25–5
53	L	January 30, 1991	2–5	@ Minnesota North Stars (1990–91)	22–26–5

February

Game	Result	Date	Score	Opponent	Record
54	W	February 1, 1991	4–1	Toronto Maple Leafs (1990–91)	23–26–5
55	W	February 2, 1991	5–2	@ Toronto Maple Leafs (1990–91)	24–26–5
56	L	February 4, 1991	4–6	Los Angeles Kings (1990–91)	24–27–5
57	W	February 8, 1991	8–4	New York Islanders (1990–91)	25–27–5
58	L	February 9, 1991	5–6	@ Minnesota North Stars (1990–91)	25–28–5
59	W	February 12, 1991	6–1	Winnipeg Jets (1990–91)	26–28–5
60	L	February 13, 1991	2–6	@ Hartford Whalers (1990–91)	26–29–5
61	L	February 16, 1991	0–3	Minnesota North Stars (1990–91)	26–30–5
62	T	February 17, 1991	3–3 OT	@ Chicago Blackhawks (1990–91)	26–30–6
63	T	February 19, 1991	4–4 OT	@ Calgary Flames (1990–91)	26–30–7
64	T	February 22, 1991	5–5 OT	@ Edmonton Oilers (1990–91)	26–30–8
65	L	February 23, 1991	2–5	@ Vancouver Canucks (1990–91)	26–31–8
66	W	February 25, 1991	5–4 OT	Toronto Maple Leafs (1990–91)	27–31–8
67	W	February 27, 1991	5–3	Montreal Canadiens (1990–91)	28–31–8

March

Game	Result	Date	Score	Opponent	Record
68	L	March 1, 1991	1–6	New Jersey Devils (1990–91)	28–32–8
69	W	March 5, 1991	6–3	Quebec Nordiques (1990–91)	29–32–8
70	W	March 7, 1991	2–0	New York Islanders (1990–91)	30–32–8
71	L	March 9, 1991	2–6	@ Minnesota North Stars (1990–91)	30–33–8
72	W	March 10, 1991	4–1	@ St. Louis Blues (1990–91)	31–33–8
73	W	March 13, 1991	4–1	@ New York Rangers (1990–91)	32–33–8
74	L	March 14, 1991	2–4	@ Hartford Whalers (1990–91)	32–34–8
75	W	March 16, 1991	5–3	@ Boston Bruins (1990–91)	33–34–8
76	L	March 22, 1991	1–3	Toronto Maple Leafs (1990–91)	33–35–8
77	L	March 23, 1991	1–4	@ Toronto Maple Leafs (1990–91)	33–36–8
78	L	March 27, 1991	4–7	Pittsburgh Penguins (1990–91)	33–37–8
79	W	March 30, 1991	6–5	New York Rangers (1990–91)	34–37–8
80	L	March 31, 1991	1–5	@ Chicago Blackhawks (1990–91)	34–38–8

Legend: Win (2 points) Loss (0 points) Tie (1 point)

== Playoffs ==
At 34–38–8, the Red Wings finished third in the Campbell Conference. In the playoffs, they faced the St. Louis Blues, who had finished 47–22–11 (and second in the Campbell Conference). The Red Wings were beaten in the seven-game series, three victories to four.

=== Round 1: St. Louis Blues vs. Detroit Red Wings ===
April 4	Detroit Red Wings	6–3	St. Louis Blues	St. Louis Arena	Recap
Brad McCrimmon (1) – 13:37		First period	No scoring
Steve Yzerman (1) – 07:08; Steve Yzerman (2) – pp – 12:01		Second period	13:10 – Brett Hull (1)
Sergei Fedorov (1) – 01:52; Kevin Miller (1) – 09:19; Steve Yzerman (3) – 14:55		Third period	10:23 – pp – Brett Hull (2); 12:44 – Adam Oates (1)
Tim Cheveldae 37 saves / 40 shots		Goalie stats	Vincent Riendeau 17 saves / 22 shots Pat Jablonski 4 saves / 5 shots

April 6	Detroit Red Wings	2–4	St. Louis Blues	St. Louis Arena	Recap
Yves Racine (1) – pp – 09:08; Bob Probert (1) – 16:56		First period	No scoring
No scoring		Second period	No scoring
No scoring		Third period	05:28 – Jeff Brown (1); 06:46 – pp – Dan Quinn (1); 12:00 – Brett Hull (3); 19:24 – Rich Sutter (1)
Tim Cheveldae 37 saves / 40 shots		Goalie stats	Vincent Riendeau 19 saves / 21 shots

April 8	St. Louis Blues	2–5	Detroit Red Wings	Joe Louis Arena	Recap
No scoring		First period	No scoring
Bob Bassen (1) – 11:00		Second period	15:19 – Kevin Miller (2)
Gino Cavallini (1) – 18:39		Third period	01:12 – Keith Primeau (1); 08:34 – Jimmy Carson (1); 09:05 – Steve Chiasson (1); 19:42 – sh – Kevin Miller (3)
Vincent Riendeau 19 saves / 23 shots		Goalie stats	Tim Cheveldae 21 saves / 23 shots

April 10	St. Louis Blues	3–4	Detroit Red Wings	Joe Louis Arena	Recap
Dan Quinn (2) – pp – 18:10		First period	04:01 – Steve Chiasson (2)
No scoring		Second period	17:05 – pp – Steve Chiasson (3)
Brett Hull (4) – 05:22; Brett Hull (5) – 17:09		Third period	08:58 – Rick Zombo (1); 11:16 – Brent Fedyk (1)
Vincent Riendeau 30 saves / 34 shots		Goalie stats	Tim Cheveldae 26 saves / 29 shots

April 12	Detroit Red Wings	1–6	St. Louis Blues	St. Louis Arena	Recap
Bobby Dollas (1) – 02:12		First period	03:45 – Adam Oates (2); 04:58 – Brett Hull (6); 09:29 – Adam Oates (3)
No scoring		Second period	00:40 – Paul Cavallini (1); 10:33 – Adam Oates (4)
No scoring		Third period	08:08 – Brett Hull (7)
Tim Cheveldae 25 saves / 30 shots Allan Bester 11 saves / 12 shots		Goalie stats	Vincent Riendeau 17 saves / 18 shots

April 14	St. Louis Blues	3–0	Detroit Red Wings	Joe Louis Arena	Recap
Dave Thomlinson (1) – 07:00		First period	No scoring
Jeff Brown (2) – 02:24		Second period	No scoring
Dave Lowry (1) – 18:19		Third period	No scoring
Vincent Riendeau 23 saves / 23 shots		Goalie stats	Tim Cheveldae 18 saves / 21 shots

April 16	Detroit Red Wings	2–3	St. Louis Blues	St. Louis Arena	Recap
No scoring		First period	12:24 – Dan Quinn (3)
Yves Racine (2) – pp – 03:24		Second period	19:39 – Brett Hull (8)
Jimmy Carson (2) – 12:27		Third period	01:59 – Rich Sutter (2)
Tim Cheveldae 22 saves / 25 shots		Goalie stats	Vincent Riendeau 18 saves / 20 shots

St. Louis won series 4–3

== Player statistics ==
=== Regular season ===
Scoring

Player	Pos	GP	G	A	Pts	PIM	+/-	PPG	SHG	GWG
Steve Yzerman	C	80	51	57	108	34	-2	12	6	4
Sergei Fedorov	C	77	31	48	79	66	11	11	3	5
Shawn Burr	LW/C	80	20	30	50	112	14	6	0	4
Yves Racine	D	62	7	40	47	33	1	2	0	1
Jimmy Carson	C	64	21	25	46	28	3	5	1	4
Dave Barr	RW	70	18	22	40	55	20	2	2	2
Johan Garpenlov	LW	71	18	22	40	18	-4	2	0	3
Bob Probert	LW	55	16	23	39	315	-3	4	0	3
Brent Fedyk	LW	67	16	19	35	38	20	0	0	1
Paul Ysebaert	C	51	15	18	33	16	-8	5	0	1
Gerard Gallant	LW	45	10	16	26	111	6	3	0	1
Rick Zombo	D	77	4	19	23	55	-2	0	0	0
Steve Chiasson	D	42	3	17	20	80	0	1	0	1
Marc Habscheid	RW/C	46	9	8	17	22	-10	0	4	1
Rick Green	D	65	2	14	16	24	10	0	0	0
Keith Primeau	C	58	3	12	15	106	-12	0	0	1
Brad McCrimmon	D	64	0	13	13	81	7	0	0	0
Per Djoos	D	26	0	12	12	16	-2	0	0	0
John Chabot	C	27	5	5	10	4	6	2	0	1
Lee Norwood	D	21	3	7	10	50	6	1	0	0
Joe Kocur	RW	52	5	4	9	253	-6	0	0	0
Bobby Dollas	D	56	3	5	8	20	6	0	0	1
Randy McKay	RW	47	1	7	8	183	-15	0	0	0
Kevin Miller	C	11	5	2	7	4	-4	0	1	0
Doug Crossman	D	17	3	4	7	17	-6	1	0	0
Tim Cheveldae	G	65	0	5	5	2	0	0	0	0
Brad Marsh	D	20	1	3	4	16	-3	0	0	0
Doug Houda	D	22	0	4	4	43	-2	0	0	0
Gary Shuchuk	RW	6	1	2	3	6	1	0	0	0
Bob Wilkie	D	8	1	2	3	2	-2	0	0	0
Sheldon Kennedy	RW	7	1	0	1	12	-1	0	0	0
Chris Luongo	D	4	0	1	1	4	0	0	0	0
Bill McDougall	C	2	0	1	1	0	0	0	0	0
Daniel Shank	RW	7	0	1	1	14	0	0	0	0
Mike Sillinger	C	3	0	1	1	0	-2	0	0	0
Allan Bester	G	3	0	0	0	0	0	0	0	0
Tom Bissett	C	5	0	0	0	0	-4	0	0	0
Alain Chevrier	G	3	0	0	0	0	0	0	0	0
David Gagnon	G	2	0	0	0	0	0	0	0	0
Glen Hanlon	G	19	0	0	0	4	0	0	0	0
Scott King	G	1	0	0	0	0	0	0	0	0
Gord Kruppke	D	4	0	0	0	0	1	0	0	0
Kevin McClelland	RW	3	0	0	0	7	-4	0	0	0
Marc Potvin	RW	9	0	0	0	55	-4	0	0	0
Dennis Vial	D/LW	9	0	0	0	16	-3	0	0	0

Goaltending

Player	MIN	GP	W	L	T	GA	GAA	SO	SA	SV	SV%
Tim Cheveldae	3615	65	30	26	5	214	3.55	2	1716	1502	.875
Glen Hanlon	862	19	4	6	3	46	3.20	0	438	392	.895
Allan Bester	178	3	0	3	0	13	4.38	0	99	86	.869
Alain Chevrier	108	3	0	2	0	11	6.11	0	55	44	.800
David Gagnon	35	2	0	1	0	6	10.29	0	28	22	.786
Scott King	45	1	0	0	0	2	2.67	0	11	9	.818
Team:	4843	80	34	38	8	292	3.62	2	2347	2055	.876

=== Playoffs ===
Scoring

Player	Pos	GP	G	A	Pts	PIM	PPG	SHG	GWG
Steve Yzerman	C	7	3	3	6	4	1	0	0
Sergei Fedorov	C	7	1	5	6	4	0	0	1
Kevin Miller	C	7	3	2	5	20	0	1	0
Doug Crossman	D	6	0	5	5	6	0	0	0
Steve Chiasson	D	5	3	1	4	19	1	0	0
Shawn Burr	LW/C	7	0	4	4	15	0	0	0
Jimmy Carson	C	7	2	1	3	4	0	0	1
Bob Probert	LW	6	1	2	3	50	0	0	0
Yves Racine	D	7	2	0	2	0	2	0	0
Brad McCrimmon	D	7	1	1	2	21	0	0	0
Keith Primeau	C	5	1	1	2	25	0	0	0
Paul Ysebaert	C	2	0	2	2	0	0	0	0
Bobby Dollas	D	7	1	0	1	13	0	0	0
Brent Fedyk	LW	6	1	0	1	2	0	0	1
Rick Zombo	D	7	1	0	1	10	0	0	0
Johan Garpenlov	LW	6	0	1	1	4	0	0	0
Randy McKay	RW	5	0	1	1	41	0	0	0
Mike Sillinger	C	3	0	1	1	0	0	0	0
Allan Bester	G	1	0	0	0	0	0	0	0
Tim Cheveldae	G	7	0	0	0	0	0	0	0
Rick Green	D	3	0	0	0	0	0	0	0
Marc Habscheid	RW/C	5	0	0	0	0	0	0	0
Brad Marsh	D	1	0	0	0	0	0	0	0
Bill McDougall	C	1	0	0	0	0	0	0	0
Marc Potvin	RW	6	0	0	0	32	0	0	0
Gary Shuchuk	RW	3	0	0	0	0	0	0	0

Goaltending

Player	MIN	GP	W	L	GA	GAA	SO	SA	SV	SV%
Tim Cheveldae	398	7	3	4	22	3.32	0	208	186	.894
Allan Bester	20	1	0	0	1	3.00	0	12	11	.917
Team:	418	7	3	4	23	3.30	0	220	197	.895

Note: GP = Games played; G = Goals; A = Assists; Pts = Points; +/- = Plus-minus PIM = Penalty minutes; PPG = Power-play goals; SHG = Short-handed goals; GWG = Game-winning goals;
MIN = Minutes played; W = Wins; L = Losses; T = Ties; GA = Goals against; GAA = Goals-against average; SO = Shutouts; SA=Shots against; SV=Shots saved; SV% = Save percentage;

== Draft picks ==
Detroit's draft picks at the 1990 NHL entry draft held at the BC Place in Vancouver, British Columbia.

Round	#	Player	Nationality	College/Junior/Club team (League)
1	3	Keith Primeau	Canada	Niagara Falls Thunder (OHL)
3	45	Vyacheslav Kozlov	Soviet Union	Khimik Voskresenki (USSR)
4	66	Stewart Malgunas	Canada	Seattle Thunderbirds (WHL)
5	87	Tony Burns	United States	Duluth-Denfeld High School (USHS-MN)
6	108	Claude Barthe	Canada	Victoriaville Tigres (QMJHL)
7	129	Jason York	Canada	Kitchener Rangers (OHL)
8	150	Wes McCauley	Canada	Michigan State University (CCHA)
9	171	Tony Gruba	United States	Hill-Murray School (USHS-MN)
10	192	Travis Tucker	United States	Avon Old Farms (USHS-CT)
11	213	Brett Larson	United States	Duluth-Denfeld High School (USHS-MN)
12	234	John Hendry	Canada	Lake Superior State University (CCHA)
S	3	Mike Casselman	Canada	Clarkson University (ECAC)
S	8	Donny Oliver	Canada	Ohio State University (CCHA)

== See also ==
- 1990–91 NHL season
