= 1990–91 Winnipeg Jets season =

NHL hockey team season

1990–91 Winnipeg Jets
- Division: 5th Smythe
- Conference: 9th Campbell
- 1990–91 record: 26–43–11
- Home record: 17–18–5
- Road record: 9–25–6
- Goals for: 260
- Goals against: 288

Team information
- General manager: Mike Smith
- Coach: Bob Murdoch
- Captain: Randy Carlyle and Thomas Steen
- Arena: Winnipeg Arena

Team leaders
- Goals: Pat Elynuik (31)
- Assists: Phil Housley (53)
- Points: Phil Housley (76)
- Penalty minutes: Gord Donnelly (256)
- Plus/minus: Randy Carlyle (+6)
- Wins: Bob Essensa (19)
- Goals against average: Bob Essensa (3.15)

The 1990–91 Winnipeg Jets season was the Jets' 19th season, their 12th season in the National Hockey League (NHL). The Jets placed fifth in the Smythe and did not qualify for the 1991 Stanley Cup playoffs.

== Off-season ==
The Winnipeg Jets made a blockbuster trade at the 1990 NHL entry draft on June 15, 1990, sending Dale Hawerchuk and their first-round pick in the same draft to the Buffalo Sabres in exchange for Phil Housley, Scott Arniel, Jeff Parker and the Sabres' first-round pick in the same draft. Hawerchuk, who had been with the Jets since the 1981–82 season, was coming off a season with 26 goals and 81 points, both career-lows, in 79 games. Housley, a defenceman, had 21 goals and 81 points in 80 games for the Sabres in the 1989–90 season, while Arniel had 18 goals and 32 points in 79 games with Buffalo. Arniel had previously played with the Jets for five seasons, from 1981 to 1986.

At the 1990 NHL entry draft, the team selected Keith Tkachuk from Malden Catholic High School, a high school in Massachusetts. Another notable pick by Winnipeg was Alexei Zhamnov in the fourth round.

On September 6, 1990, the Jets traded Laurie Boschman to the New Jersey Devils in exchange for Bob Brooke. Boschman had been with Winnipeg since the 1982–83 season and was coming off a 10-goal, 27-point season in 1989–90. Brooke had 8 goals and 18 points in 35 games with the Devils. However, the next day, he announced his retirement from professional hockey. As compensation, the Jets then received the Devils' fifth-round pick in the 1991 NHL entry draft.

On September 30, 1990, Winnipeg traded Peter Taglianetti to the Minnesota North Stars in exchange for future considerations. Taglianetti had 3 goals and 9 points in 49 games with the Jets in 1989–90.

The Jets changed their primary logo and uniforms for the 1990–91 season, however, the team stayed with the same colours of blue, red and white.

With the departure of Hawerchuk, Randy Carlyle and Thomas Steen continued to serve as co-captains.

== Regular season ==
=== Final standings ===
Smythe Division
	GP	W	L	T	GF	GA	Pts
**Los Angeles Kings**	80	46	24	10	340	254	102
**Calgary Flames**	80	46	26	8	344	263	100
**Edmonton Oilers**	80	37	37	6	272	272	80
**Vancouver Canucks**	80	28	43	9	243	315	65
Winnipeg Jets	80	26	43	11	260	288	63

Note: GP = Games played, W = Wins, L = Losses, T = Ties, Pts = Points, GF = Goals for, GA = Goals against
Note: Teams that qualified for the playoffs are highlighted in bold.

Campbell Conference
R		Div	GP	W	L	T	GF	GA	Pts
**1**	**p – Chicago Blackhawks**	**NRS**	**80**	**49**	**23**	**8**	**284**	**211**	**106**
**2**	**St. Louis Blues**	**NRS**	**80**	**47**	**22**	**11**	**310**	**250**	**105**
**3**	**Los Angeles Kings**	**SMY**	**80**	**46**	**24**	**10**	**340**	**254**	**102**
**4**	**Calgary Flames**	**SMY**	**80**	**46**	**26**	**8**	**344**	**263**	**100**
**5**	**Edmonton Oilers**	**SMY**	**80**	**37**	**37**	**6**	**272**	**272**	**80**
**6**	**Detroit Red Wings**	**NRS**	**80**	**34**	**38**	**8**	**273**	**298**	**76**
**7**	**Minnesota North Stars**	**NRS**	**80**	**27**	**39**	**14**	**256**	**266**	**68**
**8**	**Vancouver Canucks**	**SMY**	**80**	**28**	**43**	**9**	**243**	**315**	**65**
9	Winnipeg Jets	SMY	80	26	43	11	260	288	63
10	Toronto Maple Leafs	NRS	80	23	46	11	241	318	57

Divisions: NRS – Norris, SMY – Smythe

bold – Qualified for playoffs; p – Won Presidents' Trophy

== Schedule and results ==
1990–91 regular season
October

Game	Result	Date	Score	Opponent	Record	Attendance
1	W	October 4, 1990	7–1	Toronto Maple Leafs (1990–91)	1–0–0	14,144
2	T	October 6, 1990	3–3 OT	@ Edmonton Oilers (1990–91)	1–0–1	17,502
3	L	October 8, 1990	3–4	Calgary Flames (1990–91)	1–1–1	11,851
4	L	October 10, 1990	2–4	Boston Bruins (1990–91)	1–2–1	13,125
5	L	October 12, 1990	1–3	@ Washington Capitals (1990–91)	1–3–1	15,117
6	L	October 13, 1990	3–4	@ Philadelphia Flyers (1990–91)	1–4–1	17,382
7	L	October 16, 1990	1–4	@ New York Islanders (1990–91)	1–5–1	9,805
8	L	October 17, 1990	3–5	@ New York Rangers (1990–91)	1–6–1	14,942
9	W	October 19, 1990	7–5	Vancouver Canucks (1990–91)	2–6–1	12,900
10	W	October 24, 1990	3–1	Edmonton Oilers (1990–91)	3–6–1	12,185
11	W	October 26, 1990	6–2	Los Angeles Kings (1990–91)	4–6–1	15,566
12	L	October 28, 1990	2–6	Los Angeles Kings (1990–91)	4–7–1	14,087
13	W	October 31, 1990	1–0 OT	@ Edmonton Oilers (1990–91)	5–7–1	15,436

November

Game	Result	Date	Score	Opponent	Record	Attendance
14	L	November 1, 1990	1–2	@ Calgary Flames (1990–91)	5–8–1	19,974
15	W	November 3, 1990	5–3	@ Vancouver Canucks (1990–91)	6–8–1	14,066
16	L	November 6, 1990	2–4	Philadelphia Flyers (1990–91)	6–9–1	11,771
17	W	November 9, 1990	5–4	Hartford Whalers (1990–91)	7–9–1	12,175
18	T	November 11, 1990	3–3 OT	@ Chicago Blackhawks (1990–91)	7–9–2	17,856
19	L	November 12, 1990	2–5	@ Toronto Maple Leafs (1990–91)	7–10–2	15,610
20	L	November 14, 1990	4–6	Pittsburgh Penguins (1990–91)	7–11–2	10,786
21	L	November 16, 1990	4–6	New York Rangers (1990–91)	7–12–2	15,498
22	W	November 18, 1990	4–3	St. Louis Blues (1990–91)	8–12–2	12,834
23	L	November 20, 1990	2–4	@ St. Louis Blues (1990–91)	8–13–2	16,905
24	L	November 22, 1990	1–3	@ New York Islanders (1990–91)	8–14–2	10,053
25	W	November 24, 1990	11–4	@ Quebec Nordiques (1990–91)	9–14–2	13,881
26	L	November 25, 1990	3–4	@ Montreal Canadiens (1990–91)	9–15–2	16,459
27	T	November 28, 1990	2–2 OT	Calgary Flames (1990–91)	9–15–3	11,871
28	L	November 30, 1990	2–4	Minnesota North Stars (1990–91)	9–16–3	12,394

December

Game	Result	Date	Score	Opponent	Record	Attendance
29	L	December 2, 1990	1–5	Vancouver Canucks (1990–91)	9–17–3	10,469
30	T	December 3, 1990	4–4 OT	New Jersey Devils (1990–91)	9–17–4	11,758
31	T	December 5, 1990	3–3 OT	@ Los Angeles Kings (1990–91)	9–17–5	14,646
32	T	December 8, 1990	4–4 OT	@ Los Angeles Kings (1990–91)	9–17–6	16,005
33	T	December 11, 1990	3–3 OT	@ St. Louis Blues (1990–91)	9–17–7	15,340
34	L	December 13, 1990	4–5	@ Chicago Blackhawks (1990–91)	9–18–7	17,576
35	W	December 15, 1990	4–2	Montreal Canadiens (1990–91)	10–18–7	15,506
36	L	December 16, 1990	2–4	Philadelphia Flyers (1990–91)	10–19–7	12,172
37	L	December 18, 1990	2–9	@ Pittsburgh Penguins (1990–91)	10–20–7	14,543
38	L	December 20, 1990	1–3	@ Detroit Red Wings (1990–91)	10–21–7	19,473
39	L	December 22, 1990	2–5	Detroit Red Wings (1990–91)	10–22–7	12,041
40	W	December 26, 1990	6–4	@ Minnesota North Stars (1990–91)	11–22–7	7,948
41	W	December 28, 1990	6–0	Boston Bruins (1990–91)	12–22–7	14,485
42	W	December 31, 1990	2–1	Vancouver Canucks (1990–91)	13–22–7	11,558

January

Game	Result	Date	Score	Opponent	Record	Attendance
43	T	January 2, 1991	3–3 OT	Calgary Flames (1990–91)	13–22–8	11,853
44	L	January 4, 1991	1–4	@ Buffalo Sabres (1990–91)	13–23–8	16,325
45	L	January 5, 1991	3–4	@ Hartford Whalers (1990–91)	13–24–8	12,006
46	L	January 7, 1991	2–5	@ Boston Bruins (1990–91)	13–25–8	13,773
47	L	January 11, 1991	1–3	Chicago Blackhawks (1990–91)	13–26–8	13,432
48	W	January 13, 1991	4–3	Calgary Flames (1990–91)	14–26–8	12,433
49	L	January 15, 1991	5–7	@ Calgary Flames (1990–91)	14–27–8	20,006
50	W	January 16, 1991	2–1	@ Vancouver Canucks (1990–91)	15–27–8	14,248
51	W	January 21, 1991	2–0	Minnesota North Stars (1990–91)	16–27–8	11,061
52	W	January 25, 1991	8–1	New York Islanders (1990–91)	17–27–8	14,052
53	L	January 27, 1991	2–3	Edmonton Oilers (1990–91)	17–28–8	12,892
54	W	January 29, 1991	5–2	@ Quebec Nordiques (1990–91)	18–28–8	13,140
55	L	January 30, 1991	4–8	@ Montreal Canadiens (1990–91)	18–29–8	16,100

February

Game	Result	Date	Score	Opponent	Record	Attendance
56	W	February 2, 1991	4–2	@ Washington Capitals (1990–91)	19–29–8	17,923
57	W	February 3, 1991	4–3	@ New York Rangers (1990–91)	20–29–8	15,017
58	T	February 6, 1991	5–5 OT	Toronto Maple Leafs (1990–91)	20–29–9	12,157
59	W	February 8, 1991	6–2	Pittsburgh Penguins (1990–91)	21–29–9	13,224
60	L	February 10, 1991	0–2	Buffalo Sabres (1990–91)	21–30–9	14,221
61	L	February 12, 1991	1–6	@ Detroit Red Wings (1990–91)	21–31–9	19,374
62	T	February 14, 1991	3–3 OT	@ New Jersey Devils (1990–91)	21–31–10	10,299
63	W	February 17, 1991	6–0	Quebec Nordiques (1990–91)	22–31–10	12,798
64	T	February 20, 1991	5–5 OT	Vancouver Canucks (1990–91)	22–31–11	11,832
65	L	February 22, 1991	4–6	Los Angeles Kings (1990–91)	22–32–11	N/A
66	L	February 24, 1991	3–5	Los Angeles Kings (1990–91)	22–33–11	15,568
67	W	February 26, 1991	5–4	Hartford Whalers (1990–91)	23–33–11	10,839
68	L	February 28, 1991	2–4	@ Los Angeles Kings (1990–91)	23–34–11	16,005

March

Game	Result	Date	Score	Opponent	Record	Attendance
69	L	March 2, 1991	3–6	@ Los Angeles Kings (1990–91)	23–35–11	N/A
70	L	March 5, 1991	4–5	Edmonton Oilers (1990–91)	23–36–11	11,568
71	L	March 8, 1991	1–2	Washington Capitals (1990–91)	23–37–11	13,701
72	W	March 10, 1991	4–3	New Jersey Devils (1990–91)	24–37–11	13,734
73	L	March 12, 1991	3–5	@ Calgary Flames (1990–91)	24–38–11	19,915
74	L	March 13, 1991	2–6	Buffalo Sabres (1990–91)	24–39–11	12,475
75	W	March 15, 1991	4–3	Edmonton Oilers (1990–91)	25–39–11	14,768
76	L	March 18, 1991	3–4 OT	@ Calgary Flames (1990–91)	25–40–11	19,915
77	L	March 22, 1991	1–3	@ Vancouver Canucks (1990–91)	25–41–11	16,123
78	W	March 23, 1991	3–0	@ Edmonton Oilers (1990–91)	26–41–11	17,503
79	L	March 28, 1991	2–3 OT	@ Vancouver Canucks (1990–91)	26–42–11	16,123
80	L	March 31, 1991	3–6	@ Edmonton Oilers (1990–91)	26–43–11	16,926

Legend: Win (2 points) Loss (0 points) Tie (1 point)

== Player statistics ==
=== Regular season ===
Scoring

Player	Pos	GP	G	A	Pts	PIM	+/-	PPG	SHG	GWG
Phil Housley	D	78	23	53	76	24	-13	12	1	3
Thomas Steen	C	58	19	48	67	49	-3	7	0	3
Pat Elynuik	RW	80	31	34	65	73	-13	16	0	4
Ed Olczyk	C	61	26	31	57	69	-20	14	0	2
Fredrik Olausson	D	71	12	29	41	24	-22	5	0	0
Paul MacDermid	RW	69	15	21	36	128	-6	3	0	1
Brent Ashton	LW	61	12	24	36	58	-10	1	0	2
Doug Evans	LW	70	7	27	34	108	-1	1	0	0
Teppo Numminen	D	80	8	25	33	28	-15	3	0	0
Randy Carlyle	D	52	9	19	28	44	6	2	0	1
Dave McLlwain	C/RW	60	14	11	25	46	-13	2	2	2
Danton Cole	C/RW	66	13	11	24	24	-14	1	1	1
Moe Mantha	D	57	9	15	24	33	-20	4	1	2
Phil Sykes	LW	70	12	10	22	59	-9	0	2	0
Scott Arniel	LW	75	5	17	22	87	-12	0	0	1
Greg Paslawski	RW	43	9	10	19	10	-6	1	0	1
Mark Osborne	LW	37	8	8	16	59	-1	0	0	2
Dave Ellett	D	17	4	7	11	6	-4	1	1	0
Mark Kumpel	RW	53	7	3	10	10	-10	0	0	0
Mike Eagles	C/LW	44	0	9	9	79	-10	0	0	0
Paul Fenton	LW	17	4	4	8	18	-4	1	0	1
Gord Donnelly	D	57	3	4	7	265	-13	0	0	0
Bryan Erickson	RW	6	0	7	7	0	1	0	0	0
Shawn Cronin	D	67	1	5	6	189	-10	0	0	0
Sergei Kharin	RW	7	2	3	5	2	2	0	0	0
Bryan Marchment	D	28	2	2	4	91	-5	0	0	0
Don Barber	W	16	1	2	3	14	-3	0	0	0
Doug Smail	LW	15	1	2	3	10	-6	0	0	0
Bob Essensa	G	55	0	3	3	6	0	0	0	0
Craig Duncanson	LW	7	2	0	2	16	-5	0	0	0
Kris Draper	C	3	1	0	1	5	0	0	0	0
Stephane Beauregard	G	16	0	1	1	2	0	0	0	0
Luciano Borsato	C	1	0	1	1	2	0	0	0	0
Rick Tabaracci	G	24	0	1	1	8	0	0	0	0
Iain Duncan	LW	2	0	0	0	2	-1	0	0	0
Guy Larose	C	7	0	0	0	8	-1	0	0	0
Rudy Poeschek	RW/D	1	0	0	0	5	0	0	0	0
Simon Wheeldon	C	4	0	0	0	4	2	0	0	0

Goaltending

Player	MIN	GP	W	L	T	GA	GAA	SO	SA	SV	SV%
Bob Essensa	2916	55	19	24	6	153	3.15	4	1496	1343	.898
Rick Tabaracci	1093	24	4	9	4	71	3.90	1	570	499	.875
Stephane Beauregard	836	16	3	10	1	55	3.95	0	423	368	.870
Team:	4845	80	26	43	11	279	3.46	5	2489	2210	.888

Note:

Pos = Position;GP = Games played; G = Goals; A = Assists; Pts = Points; PIM = Penalty minutes; +/- = Plus/minus; PPG = Power-play goals; SHG = Short-handed goals; GWG = Game-winning goals
Pos = Position;GP = Games played; Min, TOI = Minutes played; W = Wins; L = Losses; T,T/OT = Ties; OTL = Overtime losses; GA = Goals-against; GAA = Goals-against average; SO = Shutouts; SA = Shots against; SV = Shots saved;SV% = Save percentage;

== Transactions ==
=== Trades ===
July 9, 1990	To New York Rangers Brian McReynolds	To Winnipeg Jets Simon Wheeldon
September 6, 1990	To New Jersey Devils Laurie Boschman	To Winnipeg Jets 5th round pick in 1991 - Yan Kaminsky
September 6, 1990	To Minnesota North Stars Brian Hunt	To Winnipeg Jets Craig Duncanson
September 30, 1990	To Minnesota North Stars Peter Taglianetti	To Winnipeg Jets Future Considerations
November 7, 1990	To Minnesota North Stars Doug Smail	To Winnipeg Jets Don Barber
November 10, 1990	To Toronto Maple Leafs Dave Ellett; Paul Fenton	To Winnipeg Jets Ed Olczyk; Mark Osborne
December 14, 1990	To Chicago Blackhawks 4th round pick in 1991 - Igor Kravchuk	To Winnipeg Jets Mike Eagles
January 22, 1991	To New York Rangers Guy Larose	To Winnipeg Jets Rudy Poeschek
February 4, 1991	To Buffalo Sabres Greg Paslawski	To Winnipeg Jets Cash
February 28, 1991	To St. Louis Blues Tom Draper	To Winnipeg Jets Future Considerations
May 21, 1991	To Washington Capitals Craig Duncanson; Brent Hughes; Simon Wheeldon	To Winnipeg Jets Bob Joyce; Tyler Larter; Kent Paynter
May 24, 1991	To St. Louis Blues Future Considerations	To Winnipeg Jets Tom Draper; Jim Vesey
May 30, 1991	To Minnesota North Stars 7th round pick in 1991 - Geoff Finch	To Winnipeg Jets Rob Murray; Future Considerations
June 12, 1991	To Edmonton Oilers 5th round pick in 1991 - Ryan Haggerty	To Winnipeg Jets John LeBlanc; 10th round pick in 1992 - Teemu Numminen
June 20, 1991	To Boston Bruins Jim Vesey	To Winnipeg Jets Future Considerations
June 22, 1991	To Buffalo Sabres Tom Draper	To Winnipeg Jets 7th round pick in 1992 - Artur Oktyabrev

== Draft picks ==
Winnipeg selected the following players at the 1990 NHL entry draft, which was held at BC Place in Vancouver, British Columbia on June 16, 1990.

=== NHL amateur draft ===
Round	Pick	Player	Nationality	College/Junior/Club team
1	19	Keith Tkachuk (C)	United States	Malden Catholic High School (USHS-MA)
2	35	Mike Muller (D)	United States	Wayzata High School (USHS-MN)
4	74	Roman Meluzin (RW)	Czechoslovakia	HC Zlín
4	75	Scott Levins (RW)	United States	Tri-City Americans (WHL)
4	77	Alexei Zhamnov (C)	Soviet Union	Dynamo Moscow (Soviet Union)
5	98	Craig Martin (RW)	Canada	Hull Olympiques (QMJHL)
6	119	Daniel Jardemyr (D)	Sweden	IFK Uppsala (Sweden)
7	140	John Lilley (RW)	United States	Cushing Academy (USHS-MA)
8	161	Henrik Andersson (D)	Sweden	VIK Västerås HK (Sweden)
9	182	Rauli Raitanen (C)	Finland	Ässät (Finland)
10	203	Mika Alatalo (LW)	Finland	KooKoo (Finland)
11	224	Sergei Selyanin (D)	Soviet Union	Voskresensk Khimik (Soviet Union)
12	245	Keith Morris (LW)	Canada	University of Alaska Anchorage (WCHA)
S	19	Mark Richards (G)	United States	University of Massachusetts Lowell (Hockey East)

== See also ==
- 1990–91 NHL season
