= 1990–91 Philadelphia Flyers season =

NHL hockey team season

1990–91 Philadelphia Flyers
- Division: 5th Patrick
- Conference: 8th Wales
- 1990–91 record: 33–37–10
- Home record: 18–16–6
- Road record: 15–21–4
- Goals for: 252 (16th)
- Goals against: 267 (11th)

Team information
- General manager: Russ Farwell
- Coach: Paul Holmgren
- Captain: Ron Sutter
- Alternate captains: Mark Howe; Rick Tocchet
- Arena: Spectrum
- Average attendance: 17,342
- Minor league affiliate: Hershey Bears

Team leaders
- Goals: Rick Tocchet (40)
- Assists: Pelle Eklund (50)
- Points: Rick Tocchet (71)
- Penalty minutes: Craig Berube (293)
- Plus/minus: Mark Howe (+9)
- Wins: Ron Hextall (13)
- Goals against average: Pete Peeters (2.88)

The 1990–91 Philadelphia Flyers season was the franchise's 24th season in the National Hockey League (NHL). The Flyers missed the Stanley Cup playoffs for the second consecutive season.

== Off-season ==
After firing general manager Bobby Clarke on April 16, 1990, Russ Farwell was hired to replace him on June 6. Farwell had spent the previous two seasons as the general manager of the Western Hockey League's Seattle Thunderbirds.

== Regular season ==
Rick Tocchet scored 40 goals and Pelle Eklund recorded 50 assists. However, goaltender Ron Hextall continued to be hampered by injuries during the 1990–91 season. He only played in 36 games and as a result the Flyers missed the playoffs for the second consecutive year, finishing fifth in the division and three points short of a playoff spot after a late-season collapse.

Despite scoring the fewest short-handed goals (2) and allowing the most short-handed goals (16), the Flyers finished 7th out of 21 teams in power play percentage with 20.12% (68 for 338).

=== Season standings ===
Patrick Division
	GP	W	L	T	GF	GA	Pts
**Pittsburgh Penguins**	80	41	33	6	342	305	88
**New York Rangers**	80	36	31	13	297	265	85
**Washington Capitals**	80	37	36	7	258	258	81
**New Jersey Devils**	80	32	33	15	272	264	79
Philadelphia Flyers	80	33	37	10	252	267	76
New York Islanders	80	25	45	10	223	290	60

Note: GP = Games played, W = Wins, L = Losses, T = Ties, Pts = Points, GF = Goals for, GA = Goals against
Note: Teams that qualified for the playoffs are highlighted in bold.

Wales Conference
R		Div	GP	W	L	T	GF	GA	Pts
**1**	**Boston Bruins**	**ADM**	**80**	**44**	**24**	**12**	**299**	**264**	**100**
**2**	**Montreal Canadiens**	**ADM**	**80**	**39**	**30**	**11**	**273**	**249**	**89**
**3**	**Pittsburgh Penguins**	**PTK**	**80**	**41**	**33**	**6**	**342**	**305**	**88**
**4**	**New York Rangers**	**PTK**	**80**	**36**	**31**	**13**	**297**	**265**	**85**
**5**	**Washington Capitals**	**PTK**	**80**	**37**	**36**	**7**	**258**	**258**	**81**
**6**	**Buffalo Sabres**	**ADM**	**80**	**31**	**30**	**19**	**292**	**278**	**81**
**7**	**New Jersey Devils**	**PTK**	**80**	**32**	**33**	**15**	**272**	**264**	**79**
8	Philadelphia Flyers	PTK	80	33	37	10	252	267	76
**9**	**Hartford Whalers**	**ADM**	**80**	**31**	**38**	**11**	**238**	**276**	**73**
10	New York Islanders	PTK	80	25	45	10	223	290	60
11	Quebec Nordiques	ADM	80	16	50	14	236	354	46

Divisions: PTK – Patrick, ADM – Adams

bold – Qualified for playoffs

== Schedule and results ==
1990–91 regular season
October: 6–6–0, 12 points (home: 4–2–0; road: 2–4–0)

Game	Date	Score	Opponent	Decision	Record	Points	Recap
1	October 4	1–4	@ Boston Bruins	Hextall	0–1–0	0	L
2	October 6	1–3	@ New Jersey Devils	Hextall	0–2–0	0	L
3	October 7	7–2	Detroit Red Wings	Wregget	1–2–0	2	W
4	October 11	7–4	New Jersey Devils	Wregget	2–2–0	4	W
5	October 13	4–3	Winnipeg Jets	Wregget	3–2–0	6	W
6	October 16	5–1	@ Pittsburgh Penguins	Wregget	4–2–0	8	W
7	October 18	5–4	Quebec Nordiques	Wregget	5–2–0	10	W
8	October 20	5–3	@ Montreal Canadiens	Wregget	6–2–0	12	W
9	October 23	2–6	Washington Capitals	Wregget	6–3–0	12	L
10	October 25	3–5	@ New York Rangers	Wregget	6–4–0	12	L
11	October 27	2–5	@ New York Islanders	Hextall	6–5–0	12	L
12	October 30	2–6	Pittsburgh Penguins	Wregget	6–6–0	12	L

November: 11–4–2, 24 points (home: 6–3–1; road: 5–1–1)

Game	Date	Score	Opponent	Decision	Record	Points	Recap
13	November 1	6–3	Minnesota North Stars	Wregget	7–6–0	14	W
14	November 3	1–3	Chicago Blackhawks	Wregget	7–7–0	14	L
15	November 4	7–1	@ Toronto Maple Leafs	Wregget	8–7–0	16	W
16	November 6	4–2	@ Winnipeg Jets	Peeters	9–7–0	18	W
17	November 8	2–8	Calgary Flames	Peeters	9–8–0	18	L
18	November 10	5–2	@ Quebec Nordiques	Peeters	10–8–0	20	W
19	November 11	2–0	Vancouver Canucks	Peeters	11–8–0	22	W
20	November 13	1–1 OT	New York Rangers	Peeters	11–8–1	23	T
21	November 15	4–1	Montreal Canadiens	Peeters	12–8–1	25	W
22	November 17	2–3	@ New Jersey Devils	Peeters	12–9–1	25	L
23	November 18	1–4	New Jersey Devils	Peeters	12–10–1	25	L
24	November 21	5–4	@ Pittsburgh Penguins	Hoffort	13–10–1	27	W
25	November 23	4–1	Toronto Maple Leafs	Peeters	14–10–1	29	W
26	November 25	4–1	New York Islanders	Peeters	15–10–1	31	W
27	November 27	5–1	@ New York Islanders	Peeters	16–10–1	33	W
28	November 28	5–5 OT	@ New Jersey Devils	Hoffort	16–10–2	34	T
29	November 30	5–1	New York Rangers	Peeters	17–10–2	36	W

December: 4–8–3, 11 points (home: 0–3–3; road: 4–5–0)

Game	Date	Score	Opponent	Decision	Record	Points	Recap
30	December 2	3–6	Edmonton Oilers	Peeters	17–11–2	36	L
31	December 6	3–4	Buffalo Sabres	Wregget	17–12–2	36	L
32	December 8	0–7	@ Minnesota North Stars	Peeters	17–13–2	36	L
33	December 9	5–4	@ Chicago Blackhawks	Hextall	18–13–2	38	W
34	December 11	1–4	@ Washington Capitals	Hextall	18–14–2	38	L
35	December 13	2–2 OT	New York Islanders	Hextall	18–14–3	39	T
36	December 15	1–3	Detroit Red Wings	Wregget	18–15–3	39	L
37	December 16	4–2	@ Winnipeg Jets	Hextall	19–15–3	41	W
38	December 18	1–3	@ Detroit Red Wings	Hextall	19–16–3	41	L
39	December 20	3–3 OT	New Jersey Devils	Hextall	19–16–4	42	T
40	December 22	0–1	@ Hartford Whalers	Wregget	19–17–4	42	L
41	December 23	4–4 OT	Montreal Canadiens	Hextall	19–17–5	43	T
42	December 27	7–5	@ Los Angeles Kings	Hextall	20–17–5	45	W
43	December 29	3–1	@ St. Louis Blues	Hextall	21–17–5	47	W
44	December 31	2–5	@ Buffalo Sabres	Hextall	21–18–5	47	L

January: 6–4–1, 13 points (home: 5–1–0; road: 1–3–1)

Game	Date	Score	Opponent	Decision	Record	Points	Recap
45	January 4	3–3 OT	@ Washington Capitals	Hextall	21–18–6	48	T
46	January 5	2–3	@ New York Islanders	Wregget	21–19–6	48	L
47	January 7	2–3	@ New York Rangers	Hextall	21–20–6	48	L
48	January 12	3–1	@ Boston Bruins	Hextall	22–20–6	50	W
49	January 13	3–5	Edmonton Oilers	Hextall	22–21–6	50	L
50	January 15	5–4	Pittsburgh Penguins	Hextall	23–21–6	52	W
51	January 17	5–1	Quebec Nordiques	Hextall	24–21–6	54	W
52	January 22	4–3	Calgary Flames	Hextall	25–21–6	56	W
53	January 24	6–1	Washington Capitals	Hextall	26–21–6	58	W
54	January 26	3–5	@ Hartford Whalers	Hextall	26–22–6	58	L
55	January 31	4–2	Pittsburgh Penguins	Hextall	27–22–6	60	W

February: 4–5–2, 10 points (home: 2–3–1; road: 2–2–1)

Game	Date	Score	Opponent	Decision	Record	Points	Recap
56	February 2	0–2	Hartford Whalers	Hextall	27–23–6	60	L
57	February 5	2–3	Los Angeles Kings	Hextall	27–24–6	60	L
58	February 7	1–2	Vancouver Canucks	Hextall	27–25–6	60	L
59	February 10	2–5	@ Washington Capitals	Hextall	27–26–6	60	L
60	February 13	6–3	@ Toronto Maple Leafs	Hextall	28–26–6	62	W
61	February 16	2–3	@ New Jersey Devils	Hextall	28–27–6	62	L
62	February 18	5–3	Chicago Blackhawks	Wregget	29–27–6	64	W
63	February 21	4–4 OT	New York Rangers	Wregget	29–27–7	65	T
64	February 23	5–3	@ New York Islanders	Hextall	30–27–7	67	W
65	February 24	4–3	New York Islanders	Hextall	31–27–7	69	W
66	February 26	2–2 OT	@ Minnesota North Stars	Wregget	31–27–8	70	T

March: 2–10–2, 6 points (home: 1–4–1; road: 1–6–1)

Game	Date	Score	Opponent	Decision	Record	Points	Recap
67	March 2	4–4 OT	St. Louis Blues	Hextall	31–27–9	71	T
68	March 4	2–6	@ New York Rangers	Wregget	31–28–9	71	L
69	March 7	2–4	@ Calgary Flames	Hextall	31–29–9	71	L
70	March 8	4–5	@ Edmonton Oilers	Wregget	31–30–9	71	L
71	March 12	0–6	@ Los Angeles Kings	Hextall	31–31–9	71	L
72	March 13	5–4 OT	@ Vancouver Canucks	Wregget	32–31–9	73	W
73	March 16	0–6	@ Washington Capitals	Wregget	32–32–9	73	L
74	March 17	1–3	Boston Bruins	Peeters	32–33–9	73	L
75	March 21	1–4	St. Louis Blues	Wregget	32–34–9	73	L
76	March 23	7–4	New York Rangers	Peeters	33–34–9	75	W
77	March 24	2–6	@ Buffalo Sabres	Wregget	33–35–9	75	L
78	March 26	1–3	Pittsburgh Penguins	Peeters	33–36–9	75	L
79	March 28	0–3	Washington Capitals	Wregget	33–37–9	75	L
80	March 30	4–4 OT	@ Pittsburgh Penguins	Wregget	33–37–10	76	T

Legend: W Win (2 points) L Loss (0 points) T Tie (1 point)

== Player statistics ==
=== Scoring ===
- Position abbreviations: C = Center; D = Defense; G = Goaltender; LW = Left wing; RW = Right wing
- † = Joined team via a transaction (e.g., trade, waivers, signing) during the season. Stats reflect time with the Flyers only.
- ‡ = Left team via a transaction (e.g., trade, waivers, release) during the season. Stats reflect time with the Flyers only.

No.	Player	Pos	Regular season					
No.	Player	Pos	GP	G	A	Pts	+/-	PIM
22	Rick Tocchet	RW	70	40	31	71	2	150
9	Pelle Eklund	C	73	19	50	69	−2	14
32	Murray Craven	LW	77	19	47	66	−2	53
14	Ron Sutter	C	80	17	28	45	2	92
3	Gord Murphy	D	80	11	31	42	−7	58
18	Mike Ricci	C	68	21	20	41	−8	64
19	Scott Mellanby	RW	74	20	21	41	8	155
25	Keith Acton	C	76	14	23	37	−9	131
29	Terry Carkner	D	79	7	25	32	−15	204
20	Normand Lacombe	RW	74	11	20	31	−1	27
28	Kjell Samuelsson	D	78	9	19	28	4	82
11	Jiri Latal	D	50	5	21	26	−19	14
12	Tim Kerr	RW	27	10	14	24	−8	8
24	Derrick Smith	LW	72	11	10	21	0	37
10 (Note: Kushner wore number 36 in his first ten games.)	Dale Kushner	RW	63	7	11	18	−4	195
17	Craig Berube	LW	74	8	9	17	−6	293
8	Murray Baron	D	67	8	8	16	−3	74
26	Martin Hostak	C	50	3	10	13	1	22
2	Mark Howe	D	19	0	10	10	9	8
21	Tony Horacek	LW	34	3	6	9	6	49
6	Jeff Chychrun	D	36	0	6	6	1	105
39	David Fenyves	D	40	1	4	5	1	28
45	Chris Jensen	RW	18	2	1	3	−5	2
23	Pat Murray	LW	16	2	1	3	−5	15
41	Mark Pederson†	LW	12	2	1	3	−8	5
5	Kerry Huffman	D	10	1	2	3	1	10
50	Scott Sandelin	D	15	0	3	3	−3	0
36	Darren Rumble	D	3	1	0	1	1	0
58	Bill Armstrong	C	1	0	1	1	1	0
46	Kimbi Daniels	C	2	0	1	1	−2	0
27	Ron Hextall	G	36	0	1	1		10
33	Pete Peeters	G	26	0	1	1		14
15	Craig Fisher	C	2	0	0	0	0	0
30	Bruce Hoffort	G	2	0	0	0		0
35	Ken Wregget	G	30	0	0	0		6

=== Goaltending ===
No.	Player	Regular season										
No.	Player	GP	GS	W	L	T	SA	GA	GAA	SV%	SO	TOI
27	Ron Hextall	36	34	13	16	5	982	106	3.12	.892	0	2,035
35	Ken Wregget	30	23	10	14	3	660	88	3.56	.867	0	1,484
33	Pete Peeters	26	23	9	7	1	623	61	2.88	.902	1	1,270
30	Bruce Hoffort	2	0	1	0	1	20	3	4.59	.850	0	39

== Awards and records ==
=== Awards ===
Type	Award/honor	Recipient	Ref
League (in-season)	NHL All-Star Game selection	Rick Tocchet (Note: Tocchet was voted to the starting lineup.)	
League (in-season)	NHL Player of the Month	Pete Peeters (November)	
League (in-season)	NHL Player of the Week	Ken Wregget (October 22)	
Team	Barry Ashbee Trophy	Kjell Samuelsson	
Team	Bobby Clarke Trophy	Pelle Eklund	
Team	Class Guy Award	Gord Murphy	

=== Records ===
Among the team records set during the 1990–91 season was the fewest shorthanded goals scored in a season (2) and the most shorthanded goals allowed in a season (16).

=== Milestones ===
Milestone	Player	Date	Ref
First game	Martin Hostak	October 4, 1990	
First game	Pat Murray	October 4, 1990	
First game	Mike Ricci	October 4, 1990	
First game	Darren Rumble	November 27, 1990	
First game	Bill Armstrong	February 18, 1991	
First game	Kimbi Daniels	March 28, 1991	

== Transactions ==
The Flyers were involved in the following transactions from May 25, 1990, the day after the deciding game of the 1990 Stanley Cup Final, through May 25, 1991, the day of the deciding game of the 1991 Stanley Cup Final.

=== Trades ===
Date	Details		Ref
June 16, 1990	To Philadelphia Flyers: 3rd-round pick in 1990	To Toronto Maple Leafs: Kevin Maguire; 8th-round pick in 1991	
March 5, 1991	To Philadelphia Flyers: Mark Pederson	To Montreal Canadiens: 2nd-round pick in 1991	

=== Players acquired ===
Date	Player	Former team	Via	Ref
August 1, 1990	Rod Dallman	New York Islanders	Free agency	
August 1, 1990	Dale Kushner	New York Islanders	Free agency	
September 5, 1990	Lance Pitlick	University of Minnesota (WCHA)	Free agency	

=== Players lost ===
Date	Player	New team	Via	Ref
July 3, 1990	Ilkka Sinisalo	Minnesota North Stars	Free agency	
July 16, 1990	John Stevens	Hartford Whalers	Free agency	
August 29, 1990	Doug Sulliman		Retirement	
September 4, 1990	Ken Linseman	Edmonton Oilers	Free agency	

=== Signings ===
Date	Player	Term	Ref
August 1, 1990	Brian Dobbin		
August 1, 1990	Mark Freer		
August 1, 1990	Tony Horacek		
August 28, 1990	Martin Hostak	2-year	
September 4, 1990	Mike Ricci		
September 5, 1990	Pat Murray		
September 14, 1990	Ron Hextall	5-year (Note: Option for sixth year)	
September 14, 1990	Rick Tocchet	4-year (Note: Option for fifth year)	
November 29, 1990	Ken Wregget	1-year (Note: Arbitration award)	
May 2, 1991	Pelle Eklund	3-year	
May 14, 1991	Jiri Latal	multi-year	

== Draft picks ==
=== NHL entry draft ===
Philadelphia's picks at the 1990 NHL entry draft, which was held at BC Place in Vancouver, British Columbia on June 16, 1990. The Flyers traded their fourth-round pick, 67th overall, to the Edmonton Oilers for Normand Lacombe on January 5, 1990.

Round	Pick	Player	Position	Nationality	Team (league)	Notes
1	4	Mike Ricci	Center	Canada	Peterborough Petes (OHL)	
2	25	Chris Simon	Left wing	Canada	Ottawa 67's (OHL)	
2	40	Mikael Renberg	Right wing	Sweden	Luleå HF (Elitserien)	(Note: The Flyers traded Jay Wells and their 1991 fourth-round pick to the Buffalo Sabres for Kevin Maguire and the Sabres' second-round pick, 40th overall, on March 5, 1990.)
2	42	Terran Sandwith	Defense	Canada	Tri-City Americans (USHL)	(Note: The Flyers traded Brian Propp to the Boston Bruins for the Bruins' second-round pick, 42nd overall, on March 2, 1990.)
3	44	Kimbi Daniels	Center	Canada	Swift Current Broncos (WHL)	(Note: The Flyers traded Darren Jensen and Daryl Stanley to the Vancouver Canucks for Wendell Young and Canucks' third-round pick, 44th overall, on August 31, 1987.)
3	46	Bill Armstrong	Defense	Canada	Oshawa Generals (OHL)	
3	47	Chris Therien	Defense	Canada	Ottawa 67's (OHL)	(Note: The Flyers traded Wendell Young and their seventh-round pick, 130th overall, to the Pittsburgh Penguins for the Penguins' third-round pick, 47th overall, on September 1, 1989.)
3	52	Al Kinisky	Defense	United States	Seattle Thunderbirds (WHL)	(Note: The Flyers traded Kevin Maguire and their 1991 eighth-round pick to the Toronto Maple Leafs for the Maple Leafs' third-round pick, 52nd overall, on June 16, 1990.)
5	88	Dan Kordic	Defense	Canada	Medicine Hat Tigers (WHL)	
6	109	Vyacheslav Butsayev	Center	Soviet Union	CSKA Moscow (Soviet Union)	
8	151	Patric Englund	Left wing	Sweden	AIK (Elitserien)	
9	172	Toni Porkka	Defense	Finland	Lukko Rauma (SM-liiga)	
10	193	Greg Hanson	Defense	United States	Bloomington Kennedy High School (USHS-MN)	
11	214	Tommy Soderstrom	Goaltender	Sweden	Djurgårdens IF (Elitserien)	
12	235	Billy Lund	Center	United States	Roseau High School (USHS-MN)	

=== NHL supplemental draft ===
Philadelphia's picks at the 1990 NHL supplemental draft on June 15, 1990.

Round	Pick	Player	Position	Nationality	Team (league)
1	4	Steve Beadle	Defense	United States	Michigan State University (CCHA)
2	9	Ray Letourneau	Goaltender	United States	Yale University (ECAC)

== Farm teams ==
The Flyers were affiliated with the Hershey Bears of the AHL.
