= Brad Aitken =

Canadian ice hockey player (born 1967)

- Born: October 30, 1967 (age 58) Scarborough, Ontario, Canada
- Height: 6 ft 3 in (191 cm)
- Weight: 200 lb (91 kg; 14 st 4 lb)
- Position: Left wing
- Shot: Left
- Played for: Pittsburgh Penguins; Edmonton Oilers
- NHL draft: 46th overall, 1986; Pittsburgh Penguins
- Playing career: 1987–1993

Bradley E. Aitken (born October 30, 1967) is a Canadian former professional ice hockey Left wing who played 14 games in the National Hockey League.

== Playing career ==
Aitken spent parts of two seasons in the National Hockey League, although the majority of his career took place in the minors or Europe. He was selected by the Pittsburgh Penguins in the third round of the 1986 NHL entry draft, 46th overall, and played for Pittsburgh before he was traded to the Edmonton Oilers in exchange for Kim Issel in March 1991. Aitken played just 3 games with the Oilers before he was returned to the minors. He was also briefly the property of the Toronto Maple Leafs but was unable to crack their lineup.

On November 25, 2013, over twenty years since his retirement, Aitken was revealed to be a claimant against a group of former NHL players, who filed a suit against the NHL concerning player safety in concussions.

== Career statistics ==
			Regular season					Playoffs
Season	Team	League	GP	G	A	Pts	PIM	GP	G	A	Pts	PIM
1984–85	Peterborough Petes	OHL	63	18	26	44	36	13	1	2	3	2
1985–86	Peterborough Petes	OHL	48	9	28	37	77	—	—	—	—	—
1985–86	Sault Ste. Marie Greyhounds	OHL	20	8	19	27	11	—	—	—	—	—
1986–87	Sault Ste. Marie Greyhounds	OHL	52	27	38	65	86	4	1	2	3	5
1987–88	Pittsburgh Penguins	NHL	5	1	1	2	0	—	—	—	—	—
1987–88	Muskegon Lumberjacks	IHL	74	32	31	63	128	1	0	0	0	0
1988–89	Muskegon Lumberjacks	IHL	74	35	30	65	139	13	5	5	10	75
1989–90	Muskegon Lumberjacks	IHL	46	10	23	33	172	—	—	—	—	—
1989–90	Fort Wayne Komets	IHL	13	5	2	7	57	5	2	1	3	12
1989–90	Phoenix Roadrunners	IHL	8	2	1	3	18	—	—	—	—	—
1990–91	Muskegon Lumberjacks	IHL	44	14	17	31	143	—	—	—	—	—
1990–91	Kansas City Blades	IHL	6	4	6	10	2	—	—	—	—	—
1990–91	Cape Breton Oilers	AHL	6	2	3	5	17	3	0	2	2	6
1990–91	Pittsburgh Penguins	NHL	6	0	1	1	25	—	—	—	—	—
1990–91	Edmonton Oilers	NHL	3	0	1	1	0	—	—	—	—	—
1991–92	St. John's Maple Leafs	AHL	59	12	27	39	169	—	—	—	—	—
1992–93	St. John's Maple Leafs	AHL	4	0	1	1	2	—	—	—	—	—
1992–93	EV Landshut	GER	1	0	0	0	0	—	—	—	—	—
1992–93	Raleigh IceCaps	ECHL	25	11	12	23	129	10	1	9	10	12
NHL totals			14	1	3	4	25	—	—	—	—	—

== Transactions ==
- On June 21, 1986 the Pittsburgh Penguins selected Brad Aitken in the third-round (#46 overall) of the 1986 NHL draft.
- On March 5, 1991 the Pittsburgh Penguins traded Brad Aitken to the Edmonton Oilers in exchange for Kim Issel.
- On July 30, 1991 the Toronto Maple Leafs signed free agent Brad Aitken.
