= Randy Hillier (ice hockey) =

Canadian ice hockey player

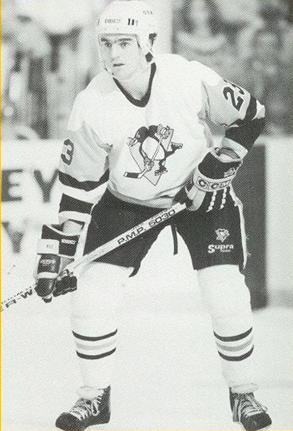
- Hillier in 1988 photo
- Born: March 30, 1960 (age 66) Toronto, Ontario, Canada
- Height: 6 ft 1 in (185 cm)
- Weight: 192 lb (87 kg; 13 st 10 lb)
- Position: Defence
- Shot: Right
- Played for: Pittsburgh Penguins; Boston Bruins; New York Islanders; Buffalo Sabres; Klagenfurt AC
- NHL draft: 102nd overall, 1980; Boston Bruins
- Playing career: 1981–1992

Randall George Hillier (born March 30, 1960) is a Canadian former professional ice hockey defenceman.

== Early life ==
Hillier was born in Toronto. As a youth, he played in the 1973 Quebec International Pee-Wee Hockey Tournament with a minor ice hockey team from Toronto.

== Career ==
Hillier was drafted by the Boston Bruins in 1980 while playing for the Sudbury Wolves of the OHL. He served the Bruins during his first three NHL seasons, but was best known for his seven seasons with the Pittsburgh Penguins. He was a member of the Pittsburgh team which won the 1991 Stanley Cup. He went on to become the assistant coach of the Penguins during the 1998 and 2002–04 seasons. He currently works for an investment company in Pittsburgh.

== Career statistics ==
			Regular Season					Playoffs
Season	Team	League	GP	G	A	Pts	PIM	GP	G	A	Pts	PIM
1977–78	Sudbury Wolves	OHA	60	1	14	15	67	—	—	—	—	—
1978–79	Sudbury Wolves	OHA	61	9	25	34	173	—	—	—	—	—
1979–80	Sudbury Wolves	OHA	60	16	49	65	143	—	—	—	—	—
1980–81	Springfield Indians	AHL	64	3	17	20	105	6	0	2	2	36
1981–82	Boston Bruins	NHL	25	0	8	8	29	8	0	1	1	16
1981–82	Erie Blades	AHL	35	6	13	19	52	—	—	—	—	—
1982–83	Boston Bruins	NHL	70	0	10	10	99	3	0	0	0	4
1983–84	Boston Bruins	NHL	69	3	12	15	125	—	—	—	—	—
1984–85	Pittsburgh Penguins	NHL	45	2	19	21	56	—	—	—	—	—
1985–86	Baltimore Skipjacks	AHL	8	0	5	5	14	—	—	—	—	—
1985–86	Pittsburgh Penguins	NHL	28	0	3	3	53	—	—	—	—	—
1986–87	Pittsburgh Penguins	NHL	55	4	8	12	97	—	—	—	—	—
1987–88	Pittsburgh Penguins	NHL	55	1	12	13	144	—	—	—	—	—
1988–89	Pittsburgh Penguins	NHL	68	1	23	24	141	9	0	1	1	49
1989–90	Pittsburgh Penguins	NHL	61	3	12	15	71	—	—	—	—	—
1990–91	Pittsburgh Penguins	NHL	31	2	2	4	32	8	0	0	0	24
1991–92	San Diego Gulls	IHL	6	0	2	2	4	—	—	—	—	—
1991–92	New York Islanders	NHL	8	0	0	0	11	—	—	—	—	—
1991–92	Buffalo Sabres	NHL	28	0	1	1	48	—	—	—	—	—
1992–93	Klagenfurt AC	Austria	23	2	9	11	0	—	—	—	—	—
NHL totals			543	16	110	126	906	28	0	2	2	93
