= Peter Ing =

Canadian ice hockey player (born 1969)

- Born: April 28, 1969 (age 57) Toronto, Ontario, Canada
- Height: 6 ft 2 in (188 cm)
- Weight: 170 lb (77 kg; 12 st 2 lb)
- Position: Goaltender
- Caught: Left
- Played for: Toronto Maple Leafs; Edmonton Oilers; Detroit Red Wings
- National team: Canada
- NHL draft: 48th overall, 1988; Toronto Maple Leafs
- Playing career: 1989–1994

Peter A. Ing (born April 28, 1969) is a Canadian former professional ice hockey goaltender. He played 74 games in the National Hockey League with the Toronto Maple Leafs, Edmonton Oilers, and Detroit Red Wings between 1989 and 1993.

== Biography ==
Ing was born in Toronto, Ontario of mixed ancestry. His father was Chinese and mother was Jewish. As a youth, Ing played in the 1982 Quebec International Pee-Wee Hockey Tournament with a minor ice hockey team from Barrie.

Ing was selected in the third round, 48th overall, by the Toronto Maple Leafs in the 1988 NHL entry draft, and joined Toronto in 1989. He briefly played for the Edmonton Oilers and the Detroit Red Wings. His later career was spent in the International Hockey League and the American Hockey League.

Ing retired from hockey and worked at a casino in Las Vegas, Nevada and later as director of slot marketing at Casino Niagara.

== Career statistics ==
=== Regular season and playoffs ===
			Regular season									Playoffs
Season	Team	League	GP	W	L	T	MIN	GA	SO	GAA	SV%	GP	W	L	MIN	GA	SO	GAA	SV%
1985–86	Toronto Marlies	GTHL	35	—	—	—	1800	91	4	3.03	—	—	—	—	—	—	—	—	—
1986–87	Windsor Compuware Spitfires	OHL	28	13	11	3	1615	105	0	3.90	—	5	4	0	161	9	0	3.35	—
1987–88	Windsor Compuware Spitfires	OHL	43	30	7	1	2422	125	2	3.10	—	3	2	0	225	7	0	1.87	—
1988–89	Windsor Compuware Spitfires	OHL	19	7	7	3	1043	76	1	4.37	—	—	—	—	—	—	—	—	—
1988–89	London Knights	OHL	32	18	11	2	1848	104	2	3.38	—	21	11	9	1093	82	0	4.50	—
1989–90	Toronto Maple Leafs	NHL	3	0	2	1	182	18	0	5.93	.832	—	—	—	—	—	—	—	—
1989–90	Newmarket Saints	AHL	48	16	19	12	2829	184	0	3.90	.884	—	—	—	—	—	—	—	—
1989–90	London Knights	OHL	8	6	2	0	480	27	0	3.38	—	—	—	—	—	—	—	—	—
1989–90	Canadian National Team	Intl	10	2	2	4	460	29	0	3.78	—	—	—	—	—	—	—	—	—
1990–91	Toronto Maple Leafs	NHL	56	16	29	8	3126	200	1	3.84	.883	—	—	—	—	—	—	—	—
1991–92	Edmonton Oilers	NHL	12	3	4	0	463	33	0	4.28	.869	—	—	—	—	—	—	—	—
1991–92	Cape Breton Oilers	AHL	24	9	10	4	1411	92	0	3.91	.887	1	0	1	60	9	0	9.00	.757
1992–93	Detroit Falcons	CoHL	3	2	1	0	136	6	0	2.65	.917	—	—	—	—	—	—	—	—
1992–93	San Diego Gulls	IHL	17	11	4	1	882	53	0	3.61	.871	4	2	2	183	13	0	4.26	.876
1993–94	Detroit Red Wings	NHL	3	1	2	0	170	15	0	5.29	.853	—	—	—	—	—	—	—	—
1993–94	Adirondack Red Wings	AHL	7	3	3	1	425	26	1	3.67	.884	—	—	—	—	—	—	—	—
1993–94	Las Vegas Thunder	IHL	30	16	7	4	1627	91	0	3.36	.893	2	0	1	40	4	0	5.87	.750
1994–95	Fort Wayne Komets	IHL	36	15	18	2	2018	119	2	3.54	.886	2	0	1	94	5	0	3.19	.919
1995–96	Fort Wayne Komets	IHL	31	12	16	0	1674	109	2	3.91	.880	—	—	—	—	—	—	—	—
1995–96	Cincinnati Cyclones	IHL	1	0	1	0	60	8	0	8.00	.704	—	—	—	—	—	—	—	—
NHL totals			74	20	37	9	3941	266	1	4.05	.878	—	—	—	—	—	—	—	—
