= Mark Osborne (ice hockey) =

Canadian ice hockey player (born 1961)

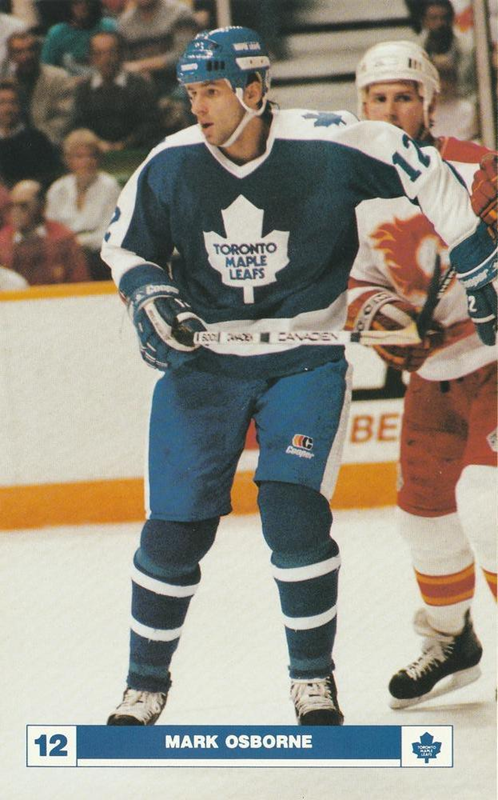
- 1988 postcard of Osborne in action for Toronto Maple Leafs against Calgary Flames
- Born: August 13, 1961 (age 65) Etobicoke, Ontario, Canada
- Height: 6 ft 2 in (188 cm)
- Weight: 205 lb (93 kg; 14 st 9 lb)
- Position: Left wing
- Shot: Left
- Played for: Detroit Red Wings; New York Rangers; Toronto Maple Leafs; Winnipeg Jets
- NHL draft: 46th overall, 1980; Detroit Red Wings
- Playing career: 1981–1997

Mark Osborne (born August 13, 1961) is a Canadian former ice hockey player. Osborne played in the National Hockey League (NHL) primarily as a checking winger between 1981 and 1995. Osborne played in 919 games, tallying 212 goals and 531 points.

== Playing career ==
As a youth, Osborne played in the 1974 Quebec International Pee-Wee Hockey Tournament with the Toronto Shopsy's minor ice hockey team. Having walked onto the team, Osborne played his entire junior career for the Niagara Falls Flyers of the Ontario Hockey League (OHL) consisting of three seasons, between 1979 and 1981. After his second year there, he was selected 46th overall by the Detroit Red Wings in the 1980 NHL entry draft.

As a rookie in the 1981–82 season he scored 26 goals and totaled 67 points, which would prove to be the second highest point total of his career, behind his 73 in the 1989–90 season with the Toronto Maple Leafs. During the 1983 off-season he was traded to the New York Rangers in the trade that saw Ron Duguay leave the Rangers. In New York, Osborne played three and a half seasons, reaching the Conference finals in 1986. He was placed on a line with Anders Hedberg and Mark Pavelich. At the 1987 trade deadline he was shipped to the Maple Leafs for his first stint there, which lasted five and a half seasons. In Toronto he played on a line with Gary Leeman and Ed Olczyk called the "GEM" line. In November 1990, he was sent to the Winnipeg Jets in a trade including linemate Olcyzk, but returned to the Leafs in a 1993 trade deadline deal for Lucien Deblois. In his second stint with Toronto he was on a checking line with Bill Berg and Peter Zezel and helped the Leafs reach the conference finals in two consecutive playoff years, (1993 and 1994), falling short each time of making it to the Stanley Cup Final. Before the lockout shortened 1994–95 season Osborne signed with the Rangers, for his final NHL season. He went on to play three more years with the Cleveland Lumberjacks of the International Hockey League (IHL) as a player-coach, retiring in 1997.

== Post-playing career ==
After retiring Osborne worked as coach of the Toronto St. Michael's Majors of the OHL from October 29, 1999, to August 2000, after serving as an assistant coach the previous season. He followed that by becoming assistant GM of the Mississauga IceDogs for the 2002–03 season. Osborne was a hockey analyst with The Score Television Network. He then became an analyst for Leafs TV, a popular media outlet covering the Toronto Maple Leafs. As of 2022 he was a pro scout for the Los Angeles Kings organization.

== Personal life ==
Osborne is a devout Christian and worked at Christian hockey camps. His nickname is Ozzie. He has been married to actress Madolyn Smith since 1988; they have two daughters together. His father, Alex Osborne, formerly led a branch of the CIBC in Toronto.

== Career statistics ==
			Regular season					Playoffs
Season	Team	League	GP	G	A	Pts	PIM	GP	G	A	Pts	PIM
1977–78	Toronto Nationals AAA	Midget	58	20	28	48	60	—	—	—	—	—
1978–79	Niagara Falls Flyers	OMJHL	62	17	25	42	53	20	6	2	8	31
1979–80	Niagara Falls Flyers	OMJHL	52	10	33	43	104	10	2	1	3	23
1980–81	Niagara Falls Flyers	OHL	54	39	41	80	140	12	11	10	21	20
1980–81	Adirondack Red Wings	AHL	—	—	—	—	—	13	2	3	5	2
1981–82	Detroit Red Wings	NHL	80	26	41	67	61	—	—	—	—	—
1982–83	Detroit Red Wings	NHL	80	19	24	43	83	—	—	—	—	—
1983–84	New York Rangers	NHL	73	23	28	51	88	5	0	1	1	7
1984–85	New York Rangers	NHL	23	4	4	8	33	3	0	0	0	4
1985–86	New York Rangers	NHL	62	16	24	40	80	15	2	3	5	26
1986–87	New York Rangers	NHL	58	17	15	32	101	—	—	—	—	—
1986–87	Toronto Maple Leafs	NHL	16	5	10	15	12	9	1	3	4	6
1987–88	Toronto Maple Leafs	NHL	79	23	37	60	102	6	1	3	4	16
1988–89	Toronto Maple Leafs	NHL	75	16	30	46	112	—	—	—	—	—
1989–90	Toronto Maple Leafs	NHL	78	23	50	73	91	5	2	3	5	12
1990–91	Toronto Maple Leafs	NHL	18	3	3	6	4	—	—	—	—	—
1990–91	Winnipeg Jets	NHL	37	8	8	16	59	—	—	—	—	—
1991–92	Winnipeg Jets	NHL	43	4	12	16	65	—	—	—	—	—
1991–92	Toronto Maple Leafs	NHL	11	3	1	4	8	—	—	—	—	—
1992–93	Toronto Maple Leafs	NHL	76	12	14	26	89	19	1	1	2	16
1993–94	Toronto Maple Leafs	NHL	73	9	15	24	145	18	4	2	6	52
1994–95	New York Rangers	NHL	37	1	3	4	19	7	1	0	1	2
1995–96	Cleveland Lumberjacks	IHL	70	31	38	69	131	—	—	—	—	—
1996–97	Cleveland Lumberjacks	IHL	59	7	25	32	96	6	1	2	3	14
1997–98	Cleveland Lumberjacks	IHL	3	0	0	0	22	—	—	—	—	—
NHL totals			919	212	319	531	1,152	87	12	16	28	141
