= Allan Bester =

Canadian ice hockey player

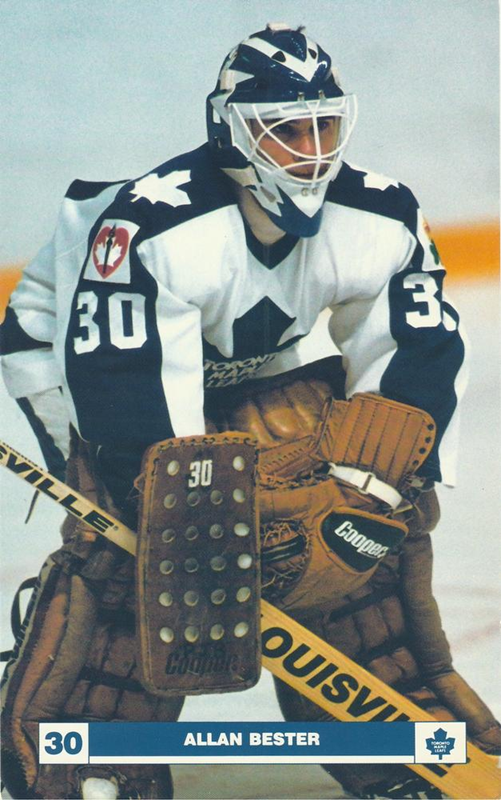
- Born: March 26, 1964 (age 62) Hamilton, Ontario, Canada
- Height: 5 ft 7 in (170 cm)
- Weight: 155 lb (70 kg; 11 st 1 lb)
- Position: Goaltender
- Caught: Left
- Played for: Toronto Maple Leafs; Detroit Red Wings; Dallas Stars
- NHL draft: 48th overall, 1983; Toronto Maple Leafs
- Playing career: 1983–1998

Alan Bester (born March 26, 1964) is a Canadian retired professional ice hockey goaltender. He played in the National Hockey League with the Toronto Maple Leafs, Detroit Red Wings, and Dallas Stars between 1984 and 1996.

== Playing career ==
Bester was born in Hamilton, Ontario. He played with the Brantford Alexanders of the OHL for three seasons before moving on to professional hockey. He was drafted into the National Hockey League (NHL) by the Toronto Maple Leafs in the third round (48th overall) of the 1983 NHL entry draft.

Bester spent parts of 11 seasons in the NHL, beginning in 1983–84. He spent eight years in Toronto, and then was traded to the Detroit Red Wings in 1991. He spent most of his career moving between the NHL and American Hockey League (AHL). In 1992, Bester won a Calder Cup with the Adirondack Red Wings. He was awarded the Jack A. Butterfield Trophy as playoff MVP. Bester made a short return to the NHL after a four-year absence, playing ten games for the Dallas Stars in the mid-1990s.

Bester ended his career in the International Hockey League (IHL). He played with both the San Diego Gulls and Orlando Solar Bears before announcing his retirement in August 1998.

== Career statistics ==
=== Regular season and playoffs ===
			Regular season									Playoffs
Season	Team	League	GP	W	L	T	MIN	GA	SO	GAA	SV%	GP	W	L	MIN	GA	SO	GAA	SV%
1981–82	Brantford Alexanders	OHL	19	4	11	0	970	68	0	4.21	—	—	—	—	—	—	—	—	—
1982–83	Brantford Alexanders	OHL	56	29	21	3	3210	188	0	3.51	—	8	3	3	480	20	1	2.50	—
1983–84	Toronto Maple Leafs	NHL	32	11	16	4	1848	134	0	4.35	.883	—	—	—	—	—	—	—	—
1983–84	Brantford Alexanders	OHL	23	12	9	1	1271	71	1	3.35	—	1	0	1	60	5	0	5.00	—
1984–85	Toronto Maple Leafs	NHL	15	3	9	1	767	54	1	4.22	.874	—	—	—	—	—	—	—	—
1984–85	St. Catharines Saints	AHL	30	9	18	1	1669	133	0	4.78	.866	—	—	—	—	—	—	—	—
1985–86	Toronto Maple Leafs	NHL	1	0	0	0	20	2	0	6.00	.600	—	—	—	—	—	—	—	—
1985–86	St. Catharines Saints	AHL	50	23	23	3	2855	173	1	3.64	.881	11	7	3	637	27	0	2.54	—
1986–87	Toronto Maple Leafs	NHL	36	10	14	3	1808	110	2	3.65	.889	1	0	0	39	1	0	1.54	.941
1986–87	Newmarket Saints	AHL	3	1	0	0	190	6	0	1.89	.937	—	—	—	—	—	—	—	—
1987–88	Toronto Maple Leafs	NHL	30	8	12	5	1607	102	2	3.81	.884	5	2	3	253	21	0	4.98	.844
1988–89	Toronto Maple Leafs	NHL	43	17	20	3	2460	156	2	3.80	.890	—	—	—	—	—	—	—	—
1989–90	Toronto Maple Leafs	NHL	42	20	16	0	2206	165	0	4.49	.873	4	0	3	196	14	0	4.29	.883
1989–90	Newmarket Saints	AHL	5	2	1	1	264	18	0	4.09	.891	—	—	—	—	—	—	—	—
1990–91	Toronto Maple Leafs	NHL	6	0	4	0	247	18	0	4.37	.860	—	—	—	—	—	—	—	—
1990–91	Newmarket Saints	AHL	19	7	8	4	1157	58	1	3.01	.909	—	—	—	—	—	—	—	—
1990–91	Detroit Red Wings	NHL	3	0	3	0	178	13	0	4.38	.869	1	0	0	20	1	0	3.00	.917
1991–92	Detroit Red Wings	NHL	1	0	0	0	31	2	0	3.87	.778	—	—	—	—	—	—	—	—
1991–92	Adirondack Red Wings	AHL	22	13	8	0	1268	78	0	3.69	.879	19	14	5	1174	50	1	2.56	.915
1992–93	Adirondack Red Wings	AHL	41	16	15	5	2268	133	1	3.52	.896	10	7	3	633	26	1	2.46	—
1993–94	San Diego Gulls	IHL	46	22	14	6	2543	150	1	3.54	.891	8	4	4	419	28	0	4.00	.891
1994–95	San Diego Gulls	IHL	58	28	23	5	3250	183	1	3.38	.894	4	2	2	272	13	0	2.86	.925
1995–96	Orlando Solar Bears	IHL	51	32	16	2	2947	176	1	3.58	.889	23	11	12	1343	65	2	2.90	.906
1995–96	Dallas Stars	NHL	10	4	5	1	601	30	0	3.00	.899	—	—	—	—	—	—	—	—
1996–97	Orlando Solar Bears	IHL	61	37	13	3	3115	132	2	2.54	.903	10	4	4	512	27	0	3.16	.904
1997–98	Orlando Solar Bears	IHL	26	13	8	1	1330	66	1	2.98	.895	2	1	0	76	6	0	4.68	.860
NHL totals			219	73	99	17	11773	786	7	4.01	.883	11	2	6	508	37	0	4.37	.870

=== International ===
Year	Team	Event	GP	W	L	T	MIN	GA	SO	GAA	SV%
1984	Canada	WJC	2	2	0	0	120	2	1	1.00	—
Junior totals			2	2	0	0	120	2	1	1.00	—
