= Avalon (disambiguation) =

Avalon is an island in the Arthurian legend.

Avalon may also refer to:

== Arts and entertainment ==
=== Comics ===
- Avalon (Marvel Comics), a fictional island

=== Film ===
- Avalon (1990 film), by Barry Levinson
- Avalon (2001 film), a Japanese/Polish film by Mamoru Oshii
- Avalon (2011 film), a Swedish drama directed by Axel Petersén

=== Television ===
- "Avalon", Gargoyles season 2, episodes 21–23 (1995)
- "Avalon", Stargate SG-1 season 9, episodes 1–2 (2005)
- "Avalon", Veritas: The Quest episode 10 (2003)

=== Games ===
- Avalon (video game), 1984
- Avalon: The Legend Lives, a text-based online game series
- Avalon, a King Arthur-themed variant to the game The Resistance

=== Literature ===
- Avalon (novel), 1965, by Anya Seton
- Avalon Series, a series of novels by Marion Zimmer Bradley
- Avalon: Web of Magic, a series of children's fantasy novels by the American author Rachel Roberts

=== Music ===
==== Bands ====
- Avalon (Finnish band), a metal opera project formed in 2013
- Avalon (American group), a contemporary Christian music group formed in 1995
- Avalon (Swedish group), a 1999–2008 duo made up of the Swedish-Congolese brothers Djo and Mohombi Moupondo

==== Albums ====
- Avalon (Anthony Green album), 2008
- Avalon (Avalon album), 1996
- Avalon (Chaos Divine album) or the title song, 2008
- Avalon (Julian Lage and Chris Eldridge album), 2014
- Avalon (Roxy Music album) or the title song (see below), 1982
- Avalon (Sully Erna album) or the title song, 2010
- Avalon (soundtrack), from the film Avalon, 1990
- Avalon: The Greatest Hits, by the American group Avalon, 2009
- Avalon Los Angeles CA 24/06/06, by Sasha, 2006
- Avalon (EP), by Gabrielle Aplin, 2017

==== Songs ====
- "Avalon" (Al Jolson song), 1920
- "Avalon" (Lovebugs song), 2006
- "Avalon" (Professor Green song), 2012
- "Avalon" (Roxy Music song), 1982
- "Avalon", by Bad Religion from The Dissent of Man, 2010
- "Avalon", by Blackmore's Night from Under a Violet Moon, 1999
- "Avalon", by Blur from The Ballad of Darren, 2023
- "Avalon", by Foxygen from Hang, 2017
- "Avalon", by Gamma Ray from Empire of the Undead, 2014
- "Avalon", by Juliet Richardson, 2005
- "Avalon", by Sigur Rós from Ágætis byrjun, 1999
- "Avalon", by Slash featuring Myles Kennedy and the Conspirators from World on Fire, 2014
- "Avalon", by Taku Iwasaki for JoJo's Bizarre Adventure (TV series), 2013
- "Isle of Avalon", by Iron Maiden from The Final Frontier, 2010
- "Avalon", by Suicideboys from Long Term Effects of Suffering, 2021
- "Avalon", by Alan Walker with Anne Gudrun from Walkerworld 2.0, 2025

==== Operas ====
- Avalon, the fifth opera in Rutland Boughton's Arthurian cycle

== Businesses ==
- Avalon Advanced Materials, a mineral development company focused on rare metal deposits in Canada
- Avalon Books, a New York-based book publishing imprint (1950–2012), purchased by Amazon.com
- AvalonBay Communities, now marketed as Avalon Communities or AVA, an American real estate investment trust and property management firm; owner of Avalon Morningside Park in Manhattan
- Avalon Guitars, a Northern Ireland guitar manufacturer
- Avalon Hill, an American game company that specializes in wargames and strategic board games
- Avalon Hotel, in Gothenburg, Sweden
- Avalon Hotel (Beverly Hills), in California, US
- Avalon Hotel (Rochester, Minnesota), US
- Avalon Interactive, a defunct video game distribution company
- Avalon Mall, St. John's, Newfoundland and Labrador, Canada
- Avalon Publishing Group (1994–2007), a New York publisher, absorbed by Perseus Books Group
- Avalon Studios, a film and television studio, in Avalon, New Zealand
- Avalon Entertainment, a talent agency and television production company
- Avalon Waterways, an American ship and river cruise line owned by Globus
- Chateau Avalon, Kansas City, Kansas, US, a luxury hotel and bed and breakfast
- Radio Avalon, a pirate radio station near Glastonbury, England, in 1983, later a legally recognised station

== People ==
=== Given name ===
- Avalon Biddle (born 1992), motorcycle racer from New Zealand
- Avalon Daggett (1907–2002), American filmmaker
- Avalon Emerson (born 1988), American electronic music producer and DJ
- Avalon Robbins (born 2001), American model and actress

=== Surname ===
- Frankie Avalon (born 1940), American actor, singer, and former teen idol born Francis Thomas Avallone
- Mickey Avalon, American rapper Yeshe Perl (born 1975)
- Whitney Avalon, American YouTuber
- Arthur Avalon, pseudonym of Sir John Woodroffe (1865–1936), British Orientalist and translator

== Places ==
=== Australia ===
- Avalon, Victoria
- Avalon Airport in Victoria
- Avalon Beach, New South Wales, a suburb of Sydney known until 2012 as Avalon
- Australian International Airshow, sometimes called the Avalon Airshow after its hosting airport

=== Canada ===
- Avalon (electoral district), Newfoundland
- Avalon, Ottawa, a neighborhood in a suburb of the city of Ottawa, Ontario
- Avalon, Saskatoon, a neighbourhood in the city of Saskatoon, Saskatchewan
- Avalon Peninsula, Newfoundland
  - Avalon Wilderness Reserve, in the above peninsula
- Province of Avalon, Newfoundland

=== United States ===
- The Avalon (Birmingham, Alabama), or "The Avalon", apartment buildings
- Avalon, California, the only city on Santa Catalina Island
- Avalon (Alpharetta, Georgia), a mixed-use development
- Avalon, Georgia, a town
- Avalon (New Windsor, Maryland), a historic home
- Avalon, Mississippi, an unincorporated community
- Avalon, Missouri, an unincorporated community
- Avalon, New Jersey, a barrier island resort community
- Avalon, North Carolina, an abandoned mill town
- Avalon, Pennsylvania, a borough
- Avalon, Texas, an unincorporated community
- Avalon, Virginia, an unincorporated community
- Avalon, Wisconsin, an unincorporated community
- Avalon Dam, on the Pecos River near Carlsbad, New Mexico
- Avalon State Park, North Hutchinson Island, Florida
- Mount Avalon, New Hampshire

=== Other places ===
- Avalon, France, a village outside of Pontcharra, Isère, France
- Avalon, New Zealand, a suburb of Lower Hutt, New Zealand
- Avalon Cemetery, in Soweto, South Africa

== Technology ==
- Windows Presentation Foundation, a user interface API designed by Microsoft (codename "Avalon")
- Avalon switch fabric, the peripheral interface used in Altera's Nios II embedded processor
- Avalonia (software framework)

== Transportation ==
- For ships, see List of ships named Avalon
- Avalon (Los Angeles Metro station), on the Metro Green Line
- Avalon (MPV), a Sri Lankan armoured vehicle
- Avalon (RTA Rapid Transit station), a station stop on the RTA Blue Line in Cleveland, Ohio
- Avalon Boulevard, a north–south thoroughfare in Los Angeles County
- Independence Avalon, a German paraglider design
- Toyota Avalon, a sedan car produced from 1994
- Toyota Avalon (concept), a concept car introduced at the 1991 Tokyo Auto Show

== Other uses ==
- Avalon Hollywood, Los Angeles, California
- Avalon Foundation, founded by Ailsa Mellon-Bruce in 1940 and later merged into the Andrew W. Mellon Foundation
- Sakura Avalon, the Cardcaptors name for the titular Cardcaptor Sakura fictional character, Sakura Kinomoto
- Avalon assemblage, a biotic assemblage of the Late Ediacaran

== See also ==
- Avalon School (disambiguation)
- Avalon Theater (disambiguation)
- Avallon, Burgundy, France, a commune
- Avalonia or Avalon terrane, an ancient microcontinent
