= Avalon Hotel (disambiguation) =

The Avalon Hotel is at Kungsportsplatsen in Gothenburg, Sweden.

Avalon Hotel may also refer to:

- Avalon Hotel (Beverly Hills) in California, US
- Avalon Hotel, former name of Avalon Music in Rochester, Minnesota, US
