= Potential National Hockey League expansion =

Growth of the North American ice hockey league

The National Hockey League (NHL) has undergone several rounds of expansion and other organizational changes during its history to reach its current 32 active teams: 25 in the United States, and 7 in Canada. The newest additions to the league are the Vegas Golden Knights in 2017, Seattle Kraken in 2021, and the Utah Mammoth in 2024. The league has also relocated several franchises, most recently in 2011 when the Atlanta Thrashers became the second and current incarnation of the Winnipeg Jets.

In April 2024, the league established the new Utah Hockey Club (now the Utah Mammoth) under the ownership of the Smith Entertainment Group, with the hockey assets of the Arizona Coyotes franchise, which was simultaneously deactivated with the option to rejoin the league as an expansion team, contingent on constructing a new arena within a five-year period; however, then-owner Alex Meruelo voluntarily relinquished his franchise rights only two months later.

During the 2024 All-Star Weekend, commissioner Gary Bettman publicly listed six cities that had expressed interest in expansion. At the June 2025 Board of Governors meeting, Bettman stated that the league is not formally pursuing expansion; however, the league informed interested parties that the likely future expansion fee will be $2 billion USD, with Bettman informing the board that Atlanta, Austin, Houston, Indianapolis, and New Orleans had expressed interest.

== Expansion sites in Canada ==
The potential of adding additional franchises in Canada had been an ongoing source of controversy for the NHL in recent years as numerous groups proposed expanding the league into a new Canadian city, or purchasing a struggling American franchise and relocating it north; to a certain extent, these issues continue even after the Atlanta Thrashers relocated to Winnipeg to become the country's seventh active team. Quebec City and the Golden Horseshoe area of Southern Ontario are most frequently proposed as locations for new Canadian teams, as was Winnipeg prior to the announced relocation of the Thrashers.

=== Background ===
==== History of Canadian franchises (1967–present) ====
Throughout the history of the NHL, attempts to bring franchises to Canadian cities have caused points of contention. Among them, the league's existing Canadian teams, especially the Montreal Canadiens, historically have raised concerns about further dividing the NHL's Canadian television revenue.

Vancouver's rejected bid for one of six new franchises added in 1967 outraged Canadians, who felt they had been "sold out". Prime Minister Lester B. Pearson stated that "the NHL decision to expand only in the US impinges on the sacred principles of all Canadians." Three years later, the Vancouver Canucks joined as the league's third Canadian franchise.

The 1979 defeat by a single vote of a merger agreement between the NHL and the rival World Hockey Association that would have resulted in three Canadian WHA franchises (the Edmonton Oilers, Quebec Nordiques, and Winnipeg Jets) joining the NHL led to a mass boycott of Molson products across Canada. In a second vote, the Montreal Canadiens, owned by Molson, reversed their position, allowing the Oilers, Nordiques (who were owned at the time by then-rival brewery Carling O'Keefe), and Jets to join the NHL for the 1979–80 NHL season (along with the New England Whalers, who would be renamed the Hartford Whalers). The Calgary Flames became Canada's seventh franchise in 1980, relocating from Atlanta.

Cost of a US dollar in Canadian dollars from 1990. The financial health of many NHL franchises in Canada was historically affected by the value of the Canadian dollar.

There was considerable upheaval amongst Canadian franchises in the 1990s. In 1992, the NHL returned to Ottawa with the second incarnation of the Senators, beating out Hamilton for an expansion team to become Canada's eighth franchise. However, the declining value of the Canadian dollar at that time, coupled with rapidly escalating salaries, placed hardships on Canadian franchises. As a result, the Nordiques and Jets left Canada, becoming the Colorado Avalanche in 1995 and the Phoenix Coyotes in 1996, respectively. Fears persisted up to the 2004–05 NHL lockout that other small-market Canadian teams, such as the Flames, Oilers, and Senators, could follow suit. The financial fortunes of Canada's teams rebounded following the lockout: Canada's six franchises represented one-third of NHL revenues in 2006–07, primarily due to the surging value of the Canadian dollar.

In May 2011, True North Sports and Entertainment, an ownership group with the support of billionaire David Thomson, 3rd Baron Thomson of Fleet, purchased the Atlanta Thrashers and moved the team to Winnipeg, Manitoba. This was the first franchise relocation since 1997 and the first franchise to locate in Canada since the Ottawa Senators entered the league in 1992. At the 2011 NHL entry draft, it was announced that the team would be named the Jets.

==== Current views on Canadian expansion ====
Map of the Golden Horseshoe in Ontario. It has been suggested the region could support another NHL franchise

Former National Hockey League Players' Association executive director Paul Kelly has repeatedly argued in favor of bringing a new team to Canada. In early 2008, he described the Canadian market to The Palm Beach Post: "The six Canadian franchises do so well, they pack the buildings, get great TV, great revenue streams. If you put another team up there, be it in Nova Scotia or Hamilton, it would be more of the same." Prior to the relocation of the Atlanta Thrashers to Winnipeg, Prime Minister Stephen Harper spoke in favor of another team in Canada, stating he has spoken with NHL owners in the past about bringing a new team to southern Ontario.

A study published in April 2011 by the University of Toronto's Mowat Centre for Policy Innovation concluded that Canada can support 12 NHL teams, twice the number it had at the time of the study, including second franchises for Montreal, Toronto and Vancouver.

In May 2013, Nate Silver, editor of the polling and statistical analysis website FiveThirtyEight, concluded that there were about as many avid hockey fans in Canada as in the United States, despite the US having nine times Canada's population. He determined that among current NHL media markets, the average Canadian market had considerably more hockey fans than the typical US market, and that Canada could support 11 or 12 teams, with two additional franchises in the Golden Horseshoe, a second franchise in Montreal, and a team in Quebec City. Silver also believed Vancouver could support a second franchise, although he thought that some of the Vancouver-area hockey market could be drawn by a Seattle-based team. In September 2026, the Board of Governors stated that Canadian representation was important in expansion despite there being no currently announced bids from Canada.

=== Greater Toronto Area ===
Although Toronto is already home to the Toronto Maple Leafs and that team's American Hockey league (AHL) development team, the Toronto Marlies, its suburbs have been mentioned as potential sites for an NHL franchise, under the premise that the Greater Toronto Area, or GTA, is the most-populous metropolitan area in Canada and therefore could support two NHL teams. Unlike other potential expansion markets, a new arena would need to be constructed, and most of the proposals for a new Toronto area team include a new arena along with them.

In April 2009, a group of businesspeople met with NHL deputy commissioner Bill Daly to discuss the possibility of bringing a second NHL franchise into the Toronto area, most likely in Vaughan, Ontario. Despite the talks, Daly reportedly stated the NHL is "not currently considering expansion nor do we have any intention or desire to relocate an existing franchise."

In June 2009, a group headed by Andrew Lopez and Herbert Carnegie proposed a $1 billion plan for a second Toronto team, called the Legacy, to begin play no earlier than 2012. The group announced a plan for a 30,000-seat arena, half of which would be priced at C$50 or less. The arena would be situated in Downsview Park in the north of the city. Twenty-five percent of net profits would be given to charity.

In 2011, a proposal surfaced to build a multi-purpose 19,500-seat arena in Markham, Ontario, northeast of Toronto, that could be used for an NHL team. The C$300 million arena was proposed as part of a proposed entertainment complex. The company behind the proposal, GTA Sports and Entertainment, was headed by W. Graeme Roustan. Roustan, a Montreal-raised private equity investor whose firm Roustan Capital partnered with Kohlberg & Company and purchased Bauer from Nike, was also the chairman of Bauer. The proposed location for the arena was near the Unionville commuter train station on land owned by Rudy Bratty, chairman and CEO of Remington Group, an organization that is charged with the development of Markham's downtown. However, the GTA Sports and Entertainment Group did not file an application for expansion prior to the July 20, 2015 deadline for that round of league expansion.

=== Hamilton ===
Hamilton was the home to the Hamilton Tigers from 1920 to 1925 prior to their move to New York City to become the New York Americans during a players' strike. The city was a candidate for expansion in 1990, being one of the favorites, but lost out to the Ottawa Senators and Tampa Bay Lightning. Hamilton's bid group attempted to negotiate the $50 million expansion fee; a condition the NHL rejected. While it was speculated that the Toronto Maple Leafs and Buffalo Sabres did not want an NHL team in Hamilton due to territorial competition, former league president Gil Stein has denied that was the case.

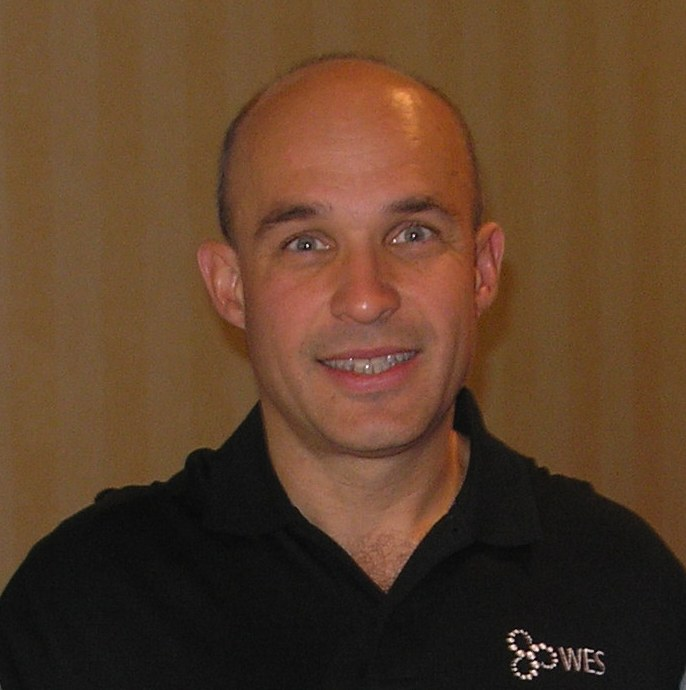
Jim Balsillie in 2008. Balsillie has made several attempts to purchase an NHL team with the intent to relocate it to Hamilton or another locale in southern Ontario

Former BlackBerry co-CEO Jim Balsillie has made several attempts to purchase an existing NHL team with the purpose of bringing it to Southern Ontario. He signed an agreement in principle to purchase the Pittsburgh Penguins for US$175 million on October 5, 2006. Penguins' majority owner Mario Lemieux agreed to the sale after struggling to gain support from local governments to build a new arena. Balsillie's purchase agreement offered to help finance a new arena, but also contained a stated intention to relocate the team to Hamilton or Kitchener–Waterloo if no deal on a new arena could be reached. Balsillie later retracted his bid, claiming that the NHL had placed conditions on the sale that he was not comfortable with, including a commitment to keep the team in Pittsburgh under any circumstances.

Balsillie then reached an agreement to purchase the Nashville Predators for $238 million on May 24, 2007, and began a season ticket campaign in Hamilton a week later intending to prove that the city was capable of hosting an NHL team. Thousands of fans purchased tickets, however the sale again fell through a month later when Predators owner Craig Leipold terminated the agreement. The Predators were later sold to a group of ten investors, led by Nashville businessman David Freeman, who promised to keep the team in Nashville. Leipold accepted $40 million less from Freeman's group than Balsillie offered, and later ended up as the majority owner of the Minnesota Wild.

During the 2008–09 NHL season, the future of the Phoenix Coyotes was on shaky ground as the team expected to lose as much as $45 million, and the league had to step in to assist with paying the team's bills. Coyotes' managing partner Jerry Moyes filed for Chapter 11 bankruptcy protection in early May 2009. Immediately afterwards, an offer by Balsillie to purchase the team was made public. The NHL challenged the Coyotes' ability to file for bankruptcy, claiming that as a result of the financial support the league had been offering the franchise, the league itself is in control of the team, and that Moyes did not have authority to act as he did. Balsillie launched a public relations campaign aiming at igniting Canadian nationalistic feelings and the perception that Bettman had an anti-Canadian agenda, including a website. His bid to purchase the Coyotes failed as the bankruptcy judge ruled his offer did not meet the NHL's rules on relocation.

The Hamilton Spectator reported in May 2009, that a Vancouver-based group led by Tom Gaglardi was planning to make a bid to purchase the Atlanta Thrashers and relocate the team to Hamilton in time for the 2010–11 NHL season. This never materialized, and the idea was eventually rendered moot by the Thrashers' sale and relocation to Winnipeg. Gaglardi later purchased the Dallas Stars and kept the team in Dallas.

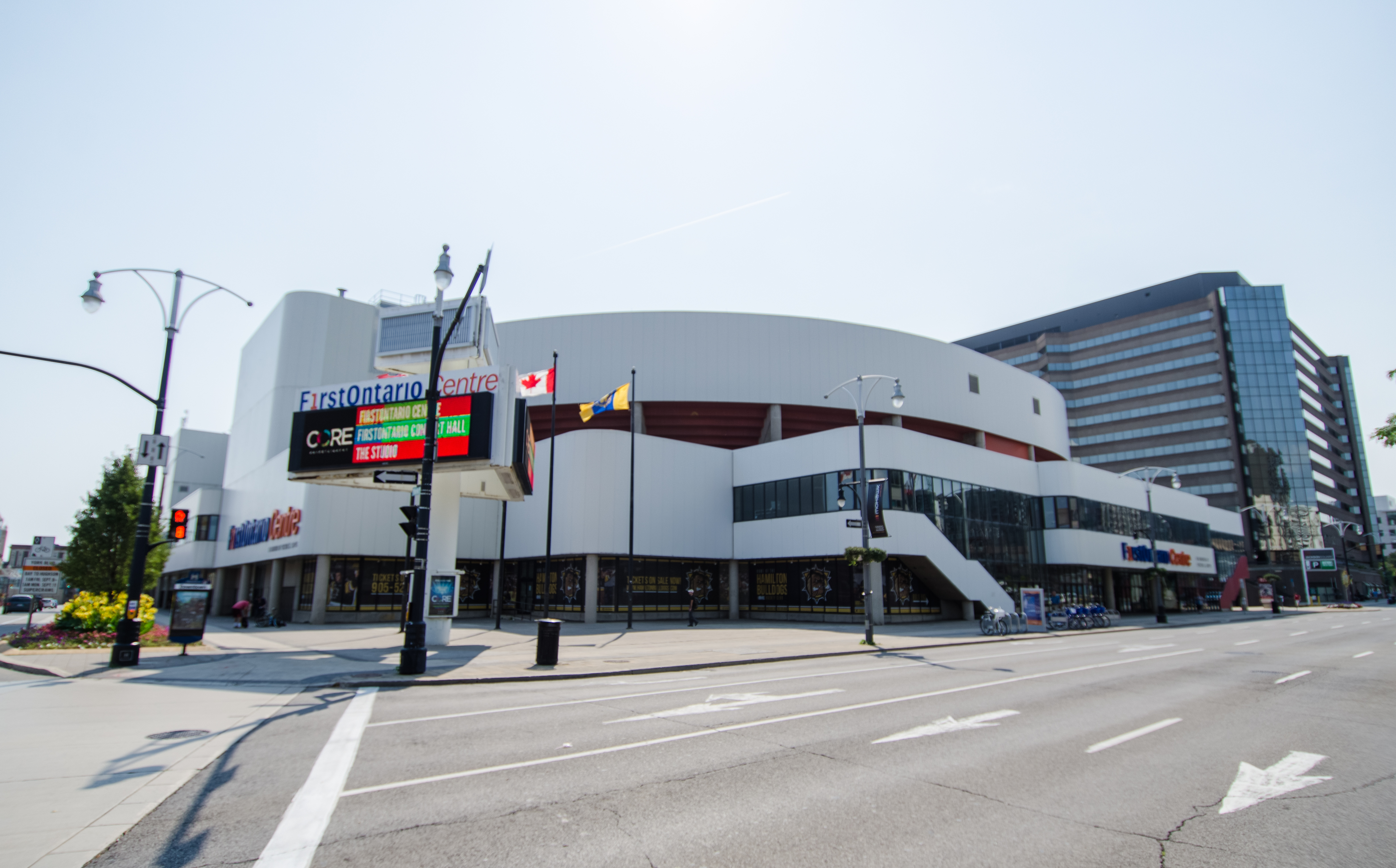
TD Coliseum has been suggested as a potential venue for a Hamilton-based NHL team

Under NHL rules, an expansion or relocation of a team to Hamilton could potentially be blocked by the Buffalo Sabres or the Toronto Maple Leafs, because TD Coliseum, the likely venue for a Hamilton NHL team, is located less than 50 miles (80 kilometres) from the Sabres' and the Leafs' home arenas. Roughly 15% of the Sabres' business comes from residents of the area of Ontario between Hamilton and Buffalo, and the Sabres or the Leafs could require "an enormous indemnification payment" to allow an additional team to be established within a 50-mile radius. An unnamed bidder made a bid for the Sabres in February 2011, offering $259 million for the team to move it out of Buffalo, which would either mean the team would relocate to Hamilton or it would clear the way for another team to make such a move. The bid was rejected in favor of an offer from Terry Pegula, who planned to keep the team in Buffalo. Relocation to Kitchener–Waterloo would avoid the territorial rights compensation as it is more than 50 miles (80 kilometres) from Buffalo and Toronto.

In 2025, a century after the Tigers left, the Hamilton and District Labour Council launched a campaign calling for the NHL to apologize for the relocation of the team, with one of the potential goals being the return of the league to the city. In 2026, the Professional Women's Hockey League placed the Hamilton Havoc in the city.

=== Quebec City ===
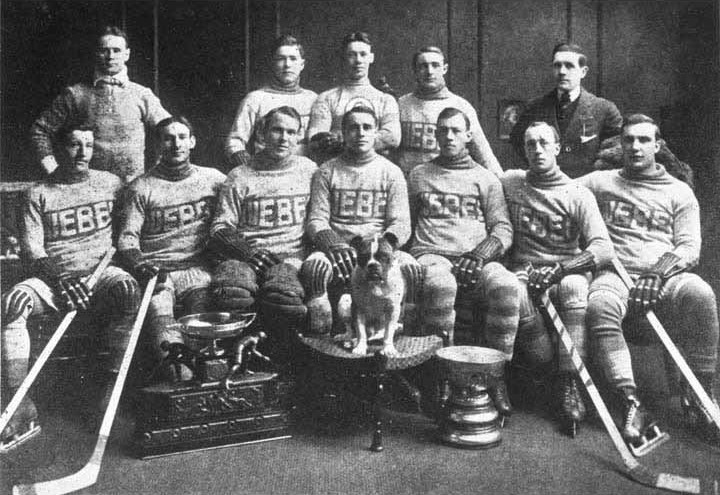
Team photograph of the Quebec Bulldogs, c. 1914. The Bulldogs were one of two professional hockey clubs formerly based in Quebec City

Quebec City has been home to two NHL hockey teams. The first, the Quebec Bulldogs, were founded in 1878 and joined the NHL upon its founding in 1917. After 1920, they moved to Hamilton, Ontario. The second, the Quebec Nordiques, played from 1972 to 1979 in the World Hockey Association before joining the NHL as part of the NHL–WHA merger. In 1995, they moved to Denver to become the Colorado Avalanche. Part of the challenge for both the Bulldogs and Nordiques was that Quebec City was by far the smallest market in the NHL. According to the Television Bureau of Canada, a prospective Quebec City team would now be in the league's second-smallest market, ahead of only Winnipeg. However, Silver's analysis suggested that the Quebec City market was comparable to the US markets of Buffalo and Washington, D.C. in terms of avid hockey fans.

In October 2009, Quebec City mayor Regis Labeaume spoke with NHL commissioner Gary Bettman and former Nordiques owner Marcel Aubut regarding a new Nordiques team (no relation to the previous team of the same name). Bettman stated that Quebec City could be considered as a candidate for an NHL team provided it built a new arena and a team were for sale.

In May 2011, Labeaume stated that Pierre Karl Péladeau, president and CEO of Quebecor, was in talks with the NHL regarding a new Nordiques' team in Quebec City. He later became a politician for and leader of the Parti Québécois, a sovereignist political party in the province. In September 2012, Quebec premier Jean Charest (a member of the rival Liberal Party and whose government had invested in the new arena) claimed that the political aspect might hinder Quebec City's chances of getting a franchise, saying that Bettman might be less likely to allow a team to move if sovereignists were in power. According to Sports Illustrated, the league is wary of the Quebec sovereignty movement because of concerns that it could destabilize the Canadian dollar. However, Mayor Labeaume insisted that Péladeau's involvement in politics would not hinder either the management of the new arena or the negotiations over getting a franchise.

In March 2014, news broke that former Canadian prime minister and vice-chairman of Quebecor Brian Mulroney was also involved with negotiations. Labeaume pointed out that Mulroney and Bettman had negotiated directly for some time, and that "Mr. Bettman is a businessman. The Quebec sovereignty project will not bother him."

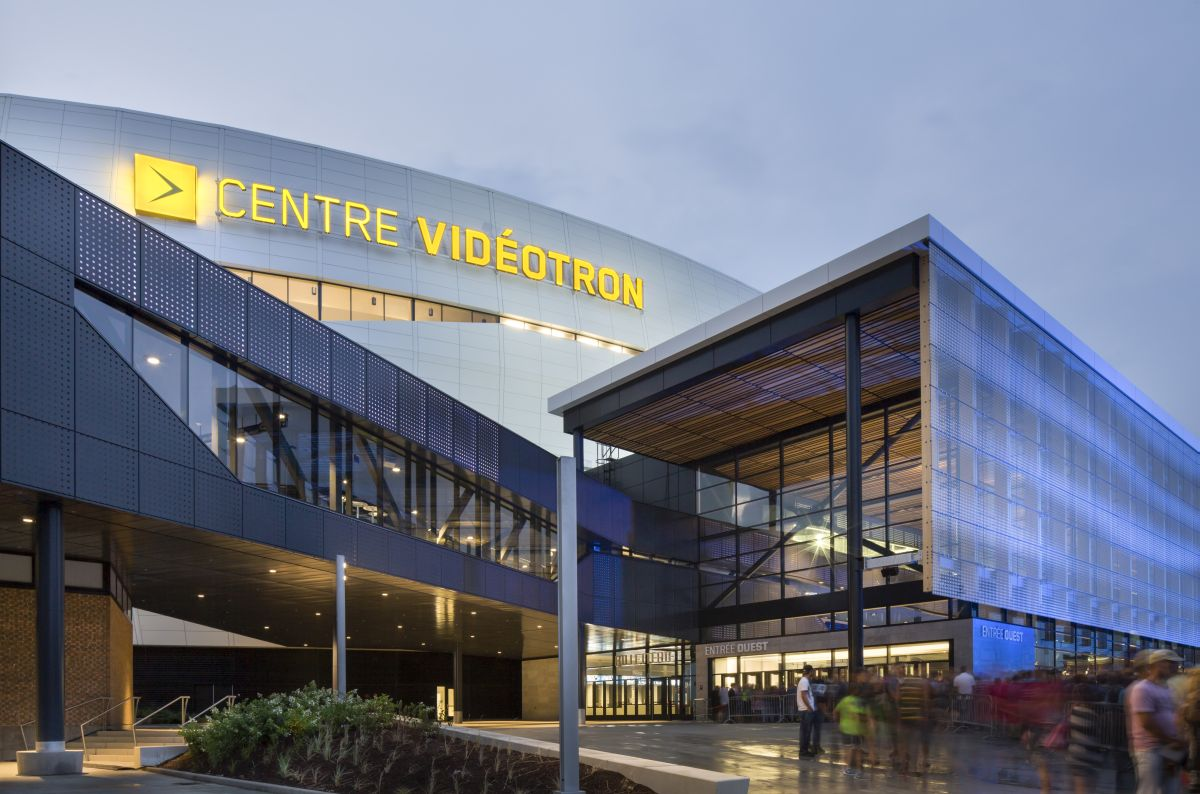
Videotron Centre is an indoor arena opened in Quebec City in 2015

Prior to the 2011–12 NHL season, an exhibition game between the Montreal Canadiens and the Tampa Bay Lightning was played at the Colisée Pepsi, the former home of the Nordiques. The Canadiens were well received despite being from rival Montreal, and the designated away team of the game. Montreal was also scheduled to host the Carolina Hurricanes at the Colisée Pepsi in 2012; however, that game was canceled due to the 2012–13 NHL lockout. In September 2012, construction started on an 18,000-seat arena in Quebec City that would eventually become known as Centre Vidéotron, the cost of which (C$400 million) was split equally between the provincial and municipal governments. The arena opened on September 12, 2015.

On June 24, 2015, Quebecor announced that it planned to apply for an NHL expansion franchise, with the aim of bringing a Nordiques team back to Quebec City. Nearly a month later, on July 20, 2015, Quebecor formally announced it had submitted an application to the NHL for an expansion franchise. On July 21, 2015, the NHL confirmed it had received an application from Quebecor. On August 5, 2015, it was announced that Quebec City had moved on to Phase II of the expansion process. The bid subsequently advanced to Phase III, which ended on September 4.

Centre Vidéotron hosted a neutral-site preseason game between the Canadiens and the Pittsburgh Penguins on September 28, 2015. The following day in New York City, Quebecor and the Las Vegas ownership group presented their bids to the NHL's executive committee. However, NHL Commissioner Gary Bettman stated in a press conference after the NHL's Board of Governors meeting that though the league continued to explore the possibility of expansion, no deadline had been established for a decision. Commissioner Bettman also said that expansion requires a three-quarters affirmative vote from the Board of Governors, but the members of the executive committee would first have to make a recommendation to the group.

Quebec City's 2015 bid on an expansion team, while not entirely ruled out, was significantly weakened after the Canadian dollar declined in value against its US counterpart. As of June 2016, the Quebec City bid was said to be still being seriously considered, but not yet decided. Accepting the Las Vegas bid, the league ultimately decided to defer the Quebec City bid in 2016, citing the value of the Canadian dollar (78 cents to one US dollar when the deferment was announced) and the distribution of teams across the two conferences, which at the time placed 14 teams in the West and the other 16 in the East; the league was therefore more interested in adding teams to the West.

Centre Vidéotron was awarded some exhibition games leading into the 2016 World Cup of Hockey, an international tournament operated by the NHL, as well as a pair of NHL preseason games in successive years; on October 4, 2016, and September 18, 2017, between the Boston Bruins and Montreal Canadiens. In November 2021, Quebec Premier François Legault stated that he would meet with Commissioner Bettman in the coming months to "find out what we need to bring back the Nordiques".

In October 2024, it was reported that Quebec-based land developer and billionaire Luc Poirier had made two bids to bring an NHL team to Quebec, with the first being a $380M USD offer to purchase and relocate the Arizona Coyotes in 2017, and an $800M USD expansion bid around 2018, after Quebecor's original bid was rejected. Both of Poirier's bids were rejected by the NHL.

=== Saskatoon ===
Saskatoon came close to landing an NHL team in 1983 when Saskatoon native "Wild" Bill Hunter, one of the founders of the World Hockey Association and its Edmonton Oilers, led an investment group that made an agreement to purchase the struggling St. Louis Blues from Ralston Purina, with a plan to relocate the franchise to Saskatchewan in time for the 1983–84 season. Hunter secured provincial backing to construct a new NHL-sized arena, thousands of season-ticket deposits, a multi-million dollar sponsorship arrangement with Molson's, and even provisionally hired Don Cherry to coach the team. However, most NHL owners, wary of Saskatoon as a market and of Hunter as a key figure in the WHA, were opposed to the move, and the NHL's board of governors vetoed the sale. Instead, the league took over the team and eventually sold it to Harry Ornest, who agreed to keep the team in St. Louis. Even though the scheme fell apart, Saskatoon went ahead and constructed a new arena, Saskatchewan Place, which opened in 1988. Hunter made one more attempt to land a team for Saskatoon, applying for an expansion franchise during the league's 1990s expansion rush. Hunter reportedly raised $50 million, but after failing to secure the remaining $20 million he required from the province, withdrew the bid.

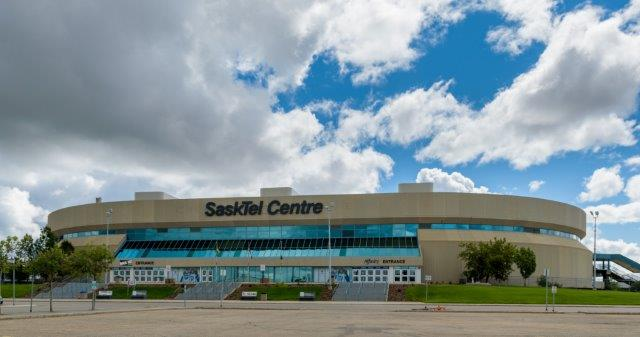
SaskTel Centre in Saskatoon, 2015. A proposal was made to play several Phoenix Coyotes home games there in 2009.

When the Ice Edge Holdings investment group made a bid to purchase the Phoenix Coyotes in 2009, they planned to move a portion of the team's home games to Saskatoon in an effort to maintain the team's viability in its main home in Phoenix, similar to the former Bills Toronto Series arrangement in the National Football League. The group had leased Saskatoon's Credit Union Centre for five home games in the 2009–10 season. The group was believed to lack the funds to buy the team outright, but remained in contention as potential minority owner until May 2011, when it pulled out of negotiations. Some members of the Ice Edge group later joined the ownership group led by Canadian businessman George Gosbee, who ultimately purchased the Coyotes and kept them in Arizona.

On Ice Management, an ownership group backed by auto racer, former Moncton Wildcats owner, and former professional hockey player John Graham, backed a long-shot bid to bring the NHL to Saskatoon. The Calgary Flames were scheduled to host the Ottawa Senators in Saskatoon for a preseason game, sponsored by Graham, in September 2013. That game led to speculation that the city may host the Flames if the team's regular arena, Scotiabank Saddledome, which had been damaged in the 2013 Alberta floods, did not complete its repairs in time for the 2013–14 season. In the end, repairs were completed on a compressed schedule, and the Saddledome reopened in September 2013. Although neither Graham nor any other bidder representing Saskatoon placed a bid in the expansion window, the city again hosted neutral-site preseason games in 2015, and 2017.

== Expansion sites in the United States ==
Several cities in the United States have been mentioned as possible future sites for new NHL teams.

=== Atlanta ===
Atlanta was formerly the home of the Flames from 1972 until 1980 when they relocated to Calgary, the Atlanta Knights of the International Hockey League from 1992 to 1996, and the Thrashers from 1999 to 2011 when they relocated to Winnipeg. Despite the failure of Atlanta's two prior franchises, NHL deputy commissioner Bill Daly made remarks in September 2023 that the league was open to returning to Atlanta, stating that past challenges the league had faced in Atlanta could be overcome, noting that the demographics of the Atlanta metropolitan area had changed significantly since the Thrashers' departure. Daly also stated that arena location would be a factor towards the success of any potential Atlanta franchise, as State Farm Arena, the former home arena of the Thrashers, had undergone major renovations that make it no longer suitable to host an NHL franchise long term, stating that an arena in the northern suburbs, closer to the Thrashers' former fanbase, would provide a better chance for long-term success. As of March 2024, there are two separate groups vying for a third Atlanta NHL franchise, with both parties planning to build an NHL-sized arena as part of a larger mixed-use development in or near Alpharetta.

On April 17, 2023, Krause Sports & Entertainment, led by Atlanta businessman Vernon Krause, announced plans to build The Gathering at South Forsyth, which is planned to be built on an undeveloped 100-acre (40 ha) tract near the Forsyth–Fulton County line. In late March 2024, the Forsyth County Board of Commissioners approved subsidies of up to $250 million towards construction under the stipulation that Krause's group secures an NHL team for the proposed arena. In the November 2024 general elections, residents of Forsyth County voted 56–44 in favor of granting the county redevelopment powers over The Gathering at South Forsyth, creating a tax-allocation district to repay the county's bonds towards the project. In a special session held on June 11, 2025, the Forsyth County Board of Commissioners gave their final approval for the development plans for The Gathering at South Forsyth, allowing Krause to make his presentation to the NHL for expansion; however, the league is unlikely to consider expansion until a new collective bargaining agreement is reached with the players' union before the end of the 2025–26 NHL season. Land grading at The Gathering at South Forsyth site began in early September 2026 and is expected to be completed by the end of January 2027; however, under the memorandum of understanding with Forsyth County, the arena cannot be included in the first phase of construction without NHL approval. On September 5, 2026, Krause gave clarifaction that a formal expansion bid had not yet been submitted to the NHL despite reports on social media, corroborating a statement deputy commissioner Bill Daly gave to The Athletic, stating that "Atlanta is not even remotely close to an application phase".

In March 2024, Alpharetta Sports & Entertainment (ASE), headed by former NHL player Anson Carter, who has lived in the Atlanta metropolitan area since retiring in 2008, unveiled a competing bid. ASE plans to redevelop the North Point Mall site, located six miles (10 km) south of The Gathering at South Forsyth site, with the support of the mall's current owner, New York Life Insurance Company. In early May 2025, the city of Alpharetta's Convention and Visitors Bureau and ASE approved jointly funding a feasibility study, commissioning sports consulting firm CAA ICON, to see if the city could support an NHL franchise and if redeveloping the North Point Mall makes financial sense. In November 2025, the city of Alpharetta voted to create a 646-acre (260 ha) tax-allocation district comprising 150 parcels in the North Point Mall vicinity, including the nine parcels which make up the mall itself. On February 26, 2026, New York Life entered an agreement with real estate management firm Jamestown L.P. and sports developer Machete Group to redevelop the North Point Mall. In June 2026, the NHL Board of Governors stated that they were still interested in Atlanta. In August 2026, Allan Walsh stated that Atlanta would be one of the expansion cities by 2030, and that same month, the planning commission of Alpharetta voted to recommend to redevelop the North Point Mall into an arena and entertainment district for the NHL team while Daly confirmed that talks were still happening with Atlanta. On August 25, the Alpharetta City Council voted 4–3 to approve the rezoning and redevelopment of the North Point Mall into a new arena for the NHL team provided that a team committed by August 2031. In September 2026, a third group formed which was led by Carter, who previously backed the Alpharetta group, and that same month the Board of Governors said an update to expansion could be delivered in December and that a bid from Atlanta was still on the table.

The ECHL's Atlanta Gladiators, of which Carter is a minority owner, have played at Gas South Arena in nearby Duluth since 2003.

=== Houston ===
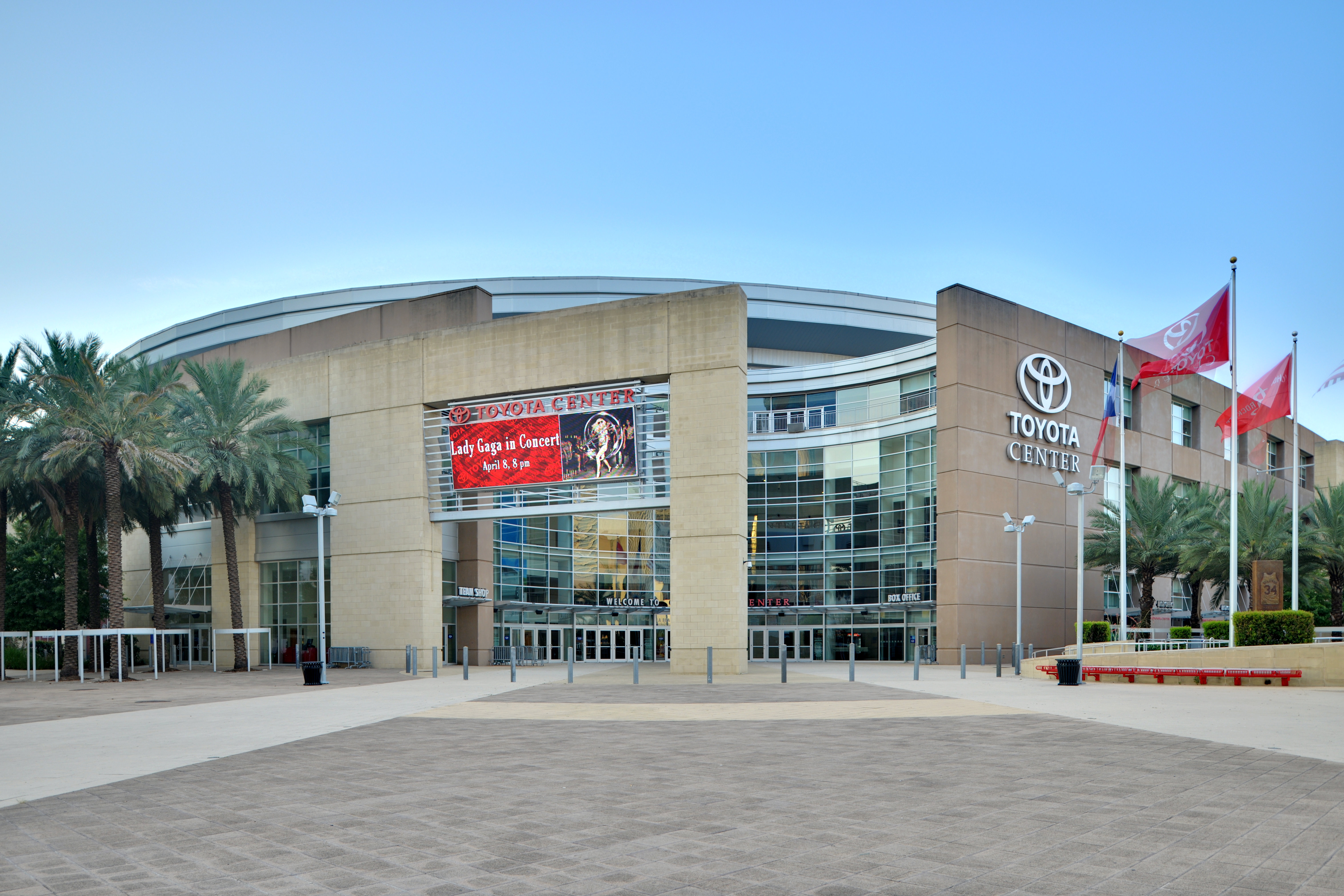
The Toyota Center in Houston in 2010

Greater Houston is the largest market in terms of both city proper and metro population in the United States or Canada without an NHL franchise; since 2016, Houston is also now the largest metropolitan area without a complete set of teams in the major professional sports leagues.

Professional ice hockey dates back to 1946 in Houston with the establishment of the Houston Skippers of the United States Hockey League. This was followed by the Houston Apollos of the Central Hockey League and the Houston Aeros of the World Hockey Association (WHA). The Aeros were an original member of the WHA. From 1972 to 1978, the franchise twice won the AVCO World Trophy and featured the first father/son combination to play together in professional hockey, Gordie Howe and his two sons Mark and Marty. The Aeros, despite being a successful franchise, were left out of the NHL–WHA merger and were forced to fold in 1978. Next came the Houston Aeros of the International Hockey League (IHL) and American Hockey League (AHL), The franchise played at The Summit (renamed the Compaq Center in 1998 and converted to a megachurch after the Aeros' departure) and moved to the Toyota Center in 2003. However, the Aeros were ultimately unable to negotiate a lease extension, leading to the team's departure from Houston in 2013.

The Minnesota North Stars briefly considered Houston when applying for relocation in 1993, but ultimately chose Dallas (and became the Stars) instead due to frosty reception from the Houston Rockets towards the idea of sharing The Summit. As part of the lease agreement between the Toyota Center (which has NHL capacity with 17,800 seats in its hockey configuration) and the Rockets, only an NHL team owned by the owner of the Rockets is allowed to play at the arena. The Rockets have twice explored purchasing an NHL team for the building, with the closest being then-owner Les Alexander's attempt to purchase the Edmonton Oilers in 1998, which was thwarted when a local ownership group came together and matched his offer. Later when the NHL expanded in 2000, several groups showed interest in bringing an NHL team to Houston, including groups led by the aforementioned Alexander, IHL/AHL Aeros owner Chuck Watson and local businessman Bob McNair (who would later go on to own the Houston Texans), and the Maloof family, who previously owned the Rockets from 1979 to 1982. Due to disagreements between Alexander and Watson surrounding the lease of the Aeros at The Summit as well as the slow construction progress of the Toyota Center, the expansion bids were rejected.

In 2017, the Toyota Center and Houston Rockets were purchased by Tilman Fertitta. In a press conference, Fertitta expressed his interest in bringing an NHL team to the Toyota Center and he had reportedly met with NHL commissioner Gary Bettman. Fertitta has stated his intentions of possibly finding a tenant that could help fill the building throughout the year, including the mention of attracting an NHL franchise. In 2023, it was reported that the Toyota Center was beginning a staged $30M renovation of the facility, which notably included the installation of permanent ice-making equipment. In 2024, reports indicated that discussions between Fertitta and the NHL were "turning more serious," and that Fertitta hoped an ice hockey franchise could boost activity in Downtown Houston.

In March 2025, it was reported that Dan Friedkin and the NHL met to discuss placing an expansion team in Houston. In March 2026, Marty Howe showed his support for placing an NHL expansion team in Houston. In June 2026, the NHL Board of Governors reportedly began looking into placing an expansion team in Texas and met with the Friedkin Group and plans for a potentially new arena in the area. In July 2026, it was reported by Doug MacLean that Houston was the frontrunner to receive the next expansion team. In August 2026, Bill Daly stated that the goal was to finalize talks with the Friedkin Group and have the Board of Governors sign off on approving the Texas expansion team by the end of 2026 and the team to start play in the 2029–30 season. That same month, Allan Walsh reported that Houston would be one of the expansion cities by 2030, while Daly stated that the timeline would see the new Texas team expansion awarded by the end of 2026 and beginning play in 2029. On August 25, 2026, Daly stated that Houston would be the primary market for the second Texas team. On August 31, Houston mayor John Whitmire stated that Houston was ready to house a NHL team and publicly supported the expansion efforts. In September 2026, the Board of Governors stated that an update to expansion could be delivered in December and that Houston was still on the table, and that same month, Mark Messier, who briefly played for the Houston Apollos, voiced his support for placing a team in Houston. In November 2026, it was reported that the expansion process for Houston would potentially be delayed to allow for more time to evaluate the area.

=== Phoenix ===
Professional ice hockey in the Phoenix area dates back to 1967 with the Phoenix Roadrunners of the Western Hockey League, which later joined the World Hockey Association in 1974 before folding in 1977. The name was reused by several teams prior to the arrival of the Arizona Coyotes in various leagues between 1977 to 1997, including the Central Hockey League, the Pacific Hockey League, and the International Hockey League. The name was also adopted by the ECHL team from 2005 to 2009 after the Coyotes' arrival. The area also briefly hosted the Phoenix Mustangs of the West Coast Hockey League from 1997 to 2001.

During the sale of the Coyotes' assets to Ryan Smith and their transfer to Salt Lake City after the 2023–24 season, it was announced that rather than function as an official relocation, the Coyotes franchise instead was marked "inactive" by the NHL, with the Utah Mammoth considered an expansion team in a similar manner to the Cleveland Browns and Baltimore Ravens. Former Coyotes owner Alex Meruelo remained part of the NHL Board of Governors and retained the rights to the Coyotes brand; Meruelo also was granted a five-year window to build a new arena in the Phoenix area, after which he would have been awarded a new expansion franchise acting as a "reactivated" Coyotes.

Two months after being granted the aforementioned opportunity, Meruelo stepped away as owner of the Coyotes, ending the initial possibility of an automatic reactivation; PHNX Sports journalist Craig Morgan later stated there are other suitors who are interested in bringing an NHL team back, and Phoenix remains on the table for future expansion.

Mat Ishbia, owner of the Phoenix Suns and Phoenix Mercury, has shown interest in bringing the NHL back to Phoenix. Ishbia stated he was disappointed that Arizona was without an NHL team, and would try to fix that in the near future.

In 2025, newly-elected Maricopa County Board of Supervisors Chair Tom Galvin announced the formation of a committee of political and business leaders to bring the NHL back to Phoenix, meeting with Gary Bettman over Zoom before Christmas in 2024. Former Coyotes' captain Shane Doan's wife Andrea was named chair of the committee later in September of that year. In June 2026, the NHL Board of Governors stated that they were still interested in Phoenix. In August 2026, Jeff Marek said that the NHL would return to Phoenix through expansion at some point while Daly said that talks were still underway with Phoenix. In September 2026, Daly confirmed that there were two groups looking to receive an expansion team in Phoenix and that same month, the Board of Governors stated that an update to expansion could be delivered in December and that Phoenix was still on the table.

=== Other cities ===
During the 2024 All-Star weekend, commissioner Gary Bettman publicly listed six cities that had expressed interest in expansion; besides Salt Lake City, which was later awarded the Utah Mammoth franchise when the Arizona Coyotes were deactivated, and the aforementioned Atlanta and Houston, Bettman noted that groups from Cincinnati, Kansas City, and Omaha had reached out to the league. During the June 2025 NHL Board of Governors meeting, Austin, Indianapolis, and New Orleans were also noted as having interest in expansion. Hartford and San Diego are also seeking expansion franchises.

Austin has expressed interest in bringing a second NHL team to Texas. Austin previously hosted the minor-league Austin Ice Bats, with the Texas Stars, the American Hockey League (AHL) affiliate of the NHL's Dallas Stars, playing at the H-E-B Center at Cedar Park in nearby Cedar Park. In June 2026, the NHL Board of Governors reportedly began looking into placing an expansion team in Texas, with the Friedkin Group looking to possibly build a new arena in the area. In August 2026, Bill Daly stated that the goal was to finalize talks with the Friedkin Group and have the Board of Governors sign off on approving the Texas expansion team by the end of 2026 and the team to start play in the 2029–30 season, and later confirmed the timeline to award the expansion team in 2026 and begin play in 2029. On August 25, 2026, Daly stated that Austin would be the alternate market for the second Texas team. In September 2026, the Board of Governors stated that an update to expansion could be delivered in December and that Austin was still on the table. In September 2026, it was reported that the Friedkin Group had leased an office in the city in search of viability. In October 2026, the Travis County Expo Center was seen as a viable site for a new arena. In November 2026, it was reported that the expansion process for Austin would potentially be delayed to allow for more time to evaluate the area.

Cincinnati's professional ice hockey lineage includes the World Hockey Association's (WHA) Cincinnati Stingers, for whom future Hockey Hall of Famers Mike Gartner and Mark Messier played, as well as the AHL's Cincinnati Mighty Ducks and multiple incarnations of the now-ECHL Cincinnati Cyclones. Potential expansion, however, is made difficult by the need to replace the aging Heritage Bank Center with a more modern arena, as well as a lack of interested ownership.

Hartford, the former home of the NHL's Hartford Whalers, has attempted to bring the league back to the city since meeting with the NHL in 2008. Like the Quebec Nordiques, the Whalers entered the NHL as one of four WHA teams absorbed by the league in 1979. In 1997, the Whalers relocated and became the Carolina Hurricanes. Like Quebec City, Hartford is the one other NHL city from the 1980s that was abandoned and has not yet regained an NHL team. Connecticut's two most recent governors, Dannel Malloy and Ned Lamont, have worked to connect interested investors to the league. In 2024, former gubernatorial candidate Mark Stewart Greenstein started a plan to bring the Whalers back with a community-owned team, akin to the Green Bay Packers of the NFL. Hartford hosts the Hartford Wolf Pack of the AHL and the University of Connecticut men's ice hockey team at PeoplesBank Arena, which was renovated in 2025.

Indianapolis was previously home of the Indianapolis Racers of the WHA, where Wayne Gretzky started his professional ice hockey career. Indianapolis was also a candidate for the relocation of the California Golden Seals in 1973, but this was rejected by the NHL's Board of Governors. Indianapolis's ice hockey history also includes the Indianapolis Capitals of the AHL, Indianapolis Chiefs of the International Hockey League (IHL), Indianapolis Checkers of the Central Hockey League (CHL) and IHL, and Indianapolis Ice of the IHL and CHL. The Indianapolis metropolitan area is home to the ECHL's Indy Fuel, who play at Fishers Event Center in nearby Fishers.

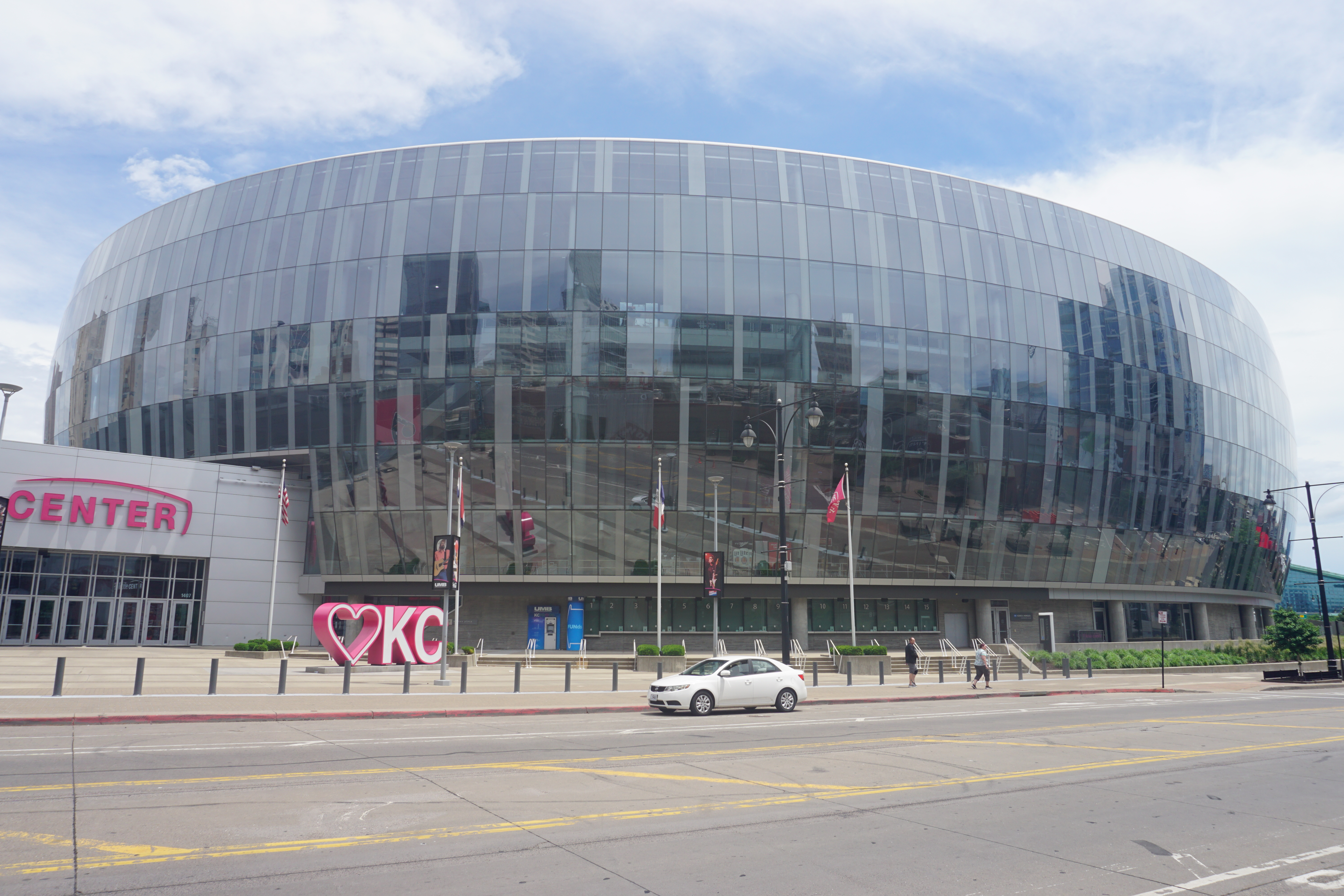
The T-Mobile Center in Kansas City in 2022.

Kansas City previously hosted the NHL's Kansas City Scouts, who played two seasons at Kemper Arena from 1974 to 1976; the team ultimately relocated to Denver to become the Colorado Rockies, owing to poor attendance and on-ice performance in Kansas City; the Scouts' former franchise survives today as the New Jersey Devils. The city has since hosted a succession of minor-league teams, most recently the currently-active Kansas City Mavericks of the ECHL; it was also a candidate for relocating the Pittsburgh Penguins in 2007, though it did not materialize. The T-Mobile Center is capable of hosting an NHL team, having previously hosted St. Louis Blues preseason games, and both local officials (including mayor Quinton Lucas) and prominent Kansas City individuals (including Mavericks owner Lamar Hunt Jr. and Kansas City Chiefs quarterback Patrick Mahomes) have expressed interest in either expansion or the relocation of an existing team. However, no interested ownership groups have publicly come forward, with Hunt previously describing the NHL's $500 million USD expansion fee as "ridiculously big" in 2015, and later stating in 2023 that an expansion team "doesn't seem realistic".

In February 2025, it was reported that NHL officials reportedly met in New York City with a group from New Orleans regarding bringing an expansion team to the city. New Orleans's last hockey team was the ECHL's New Orleans Brass, who played from 1997 to 2002 at Municipal Auditorium and New Orleans Arena until increasing costs from converting the arena between basketball and hockey configurations for the New Orleans Hornets and a lack of a suitable alternative arena in the area caused the team to fold.

Omaha has had a comparatively limited ice hockey history, with its professional lineage limited to multiple incarnations of the minor-league Omaha Knights/Omaha Ak-Sar-Ben Knights. The city currently hosts NCAA collegiate ice hockey at the Division I level with University of Nebraska–Omaha, and junior ice hockey with the Omaha Lancers of the United States Hockey League. While Omaha lacks an NHL-capable venue, local property developer Rod Yates has publicly stated a desire to build an arena in Gretna, as part of a proposed "Good Life District" surrounding the Nebraska Crossing, an outdoor lifestyle center; Yates and Nebraska governor Jim Pillen additionally met with NHL officials in New York City in February 2024, in order to pitch the league on expansion.

San Diego has proposed to build Midway Arena with the goal of attracting an NHL team. The city was previously home to the San Diego Skyhawks from 1941 to 1950, the San Diego Mariners of the WHA from 1974 to 1977, and four iterations of the San Diego Gulls since 1966: the first in the WHL, the second in the IHL, the third in the ECHL, and the current San Diego Gulls of the AHL who play at Pechanga Arena.

== Expansion outside Canada and the United States ==
Speculation about NHL expansion to Europe took place as far back as the 1960s. David Molson, then-owner of the Montreal Canadiens, stated that he looked forward to a "world playoff" for the Stanley Cup. In 1969, Clarence Campbell, president of the NHL, was quoted as saying "It is conceivable that the Stanley Cup will be played for in Moscow in the not too distant future. When it does, the World Tournament as we know it will just disappear.... The game will continue to expand."

NHL deputy commissioner Bill Daly stated in 2008 that expansion into Europe was a possibility "within 10 years' time." In August 2010, the International Ice Hockey Federation president René Fasel stated that he would strongly oppose any expansion by the NHL into European markets. Time zone complications would also be an obstacle. 2008 was also the year that the Russian Superleague evolved into the Kontinental Hockey League, which is recognized as one of the world's premier professional leagues after the NHL and has grown to include teams in Russia, Belarus, Kazakhstan, and China.

In 2024, Daly once again did not rule out the possibility of a European expansion, noting it was a possible "longer-term play."

== See also ==
- Timeline of the National Hockey League
