= Avalon (comics) =

Avalon, in comics, may refer to:

- Avalon (webcomic), a webcomic written by Josh Phillips
- Marvel Comics locations:
  - Avalon (Marvel Comics), an otherdimensional realm which has also been called "Otherworld"
  - Avalon, in the Marvel Comics alternate reality Age of Apocalypse, the name given to the Savage Land
  - Avalon, the name Magneto gave to Cable's space station Greymalkin, when he took it over. After the station returned to Earth, Cable rebuilt it and renamed it Providence (comics)
- Avalon, the surname of four Cardcaptors characters (the American-version of Cardcaptor Sakura):
  - Sakura Avalon
  - Tori Avalon
  - Aiden Avalon
  - Natasha Avalon
- Captain Avalon, an alias used briefly by The Captain
- Avalon Studios (comics company) was a subsidiary of Image Comics founded by Whilce Portacio and Brian Haberlin in the 1990s

== See also ==
- Avalon (disambiguation)
- Otherworld (comics)
