= NHL expansion =

NHL expansion may refer to:

- 1967 NHL expansion
- 1979 NHL expansion
- Potential National Hockey League expansion
