= Avalon School =

Avalon School may refer to:

- Avalon Public School, Orleans, Ontario, Canada
- Avalon School, Avalon, New Zealand
- Avalon Intermediate School, Avalon, New Zealand
- Avalon School (California), United States
- The Avalon School, Maryland, United States
- Avalon School District, Avalon, New Jersey, United States
- Avalon School (Minnesota), United States
- Avalon High School, Avalon, Texas, United States

== See also ==
- Avalon Elementary School (disambiguation)
