= North Point Mall =

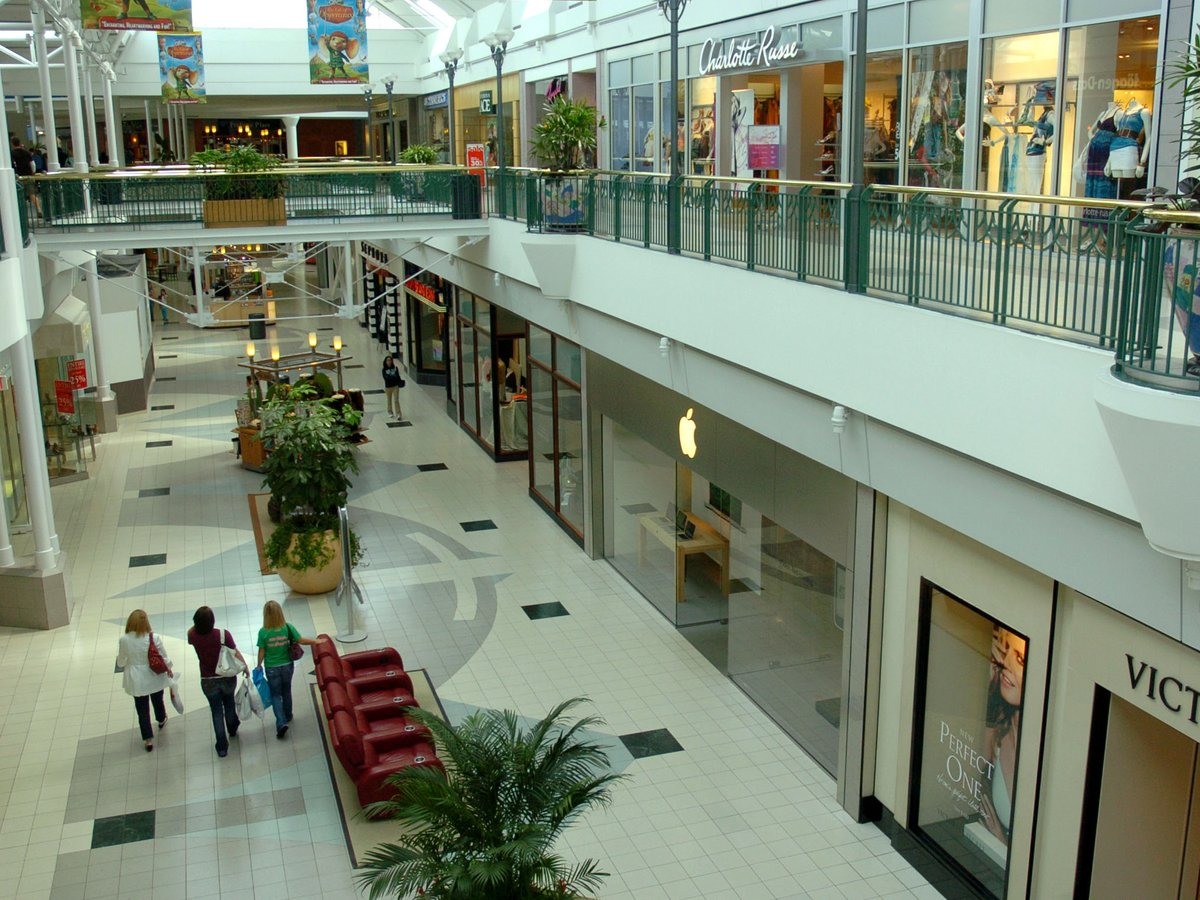
- Concourse between Macy's and Sears
- Location: Alpharetta, Georgia, United States
- Coordinates: 34.048012°N 84.294738°W
- Opened: October 20, 1993; 33 years ago
- Developer: Homart Development Company
- Manager: Trademark Property
- Owner: Trademark Property
- Num. of stores: 138
- Num. of anchor tenants: 5
- Floor area: 1,327,313 sq ft (123,000 m^{2}).
- Floors: 2 (3 in Dillard's)
- Parking: 7,400
- Website: northpointmall.com

North Point Mall is a shopping mall, located in Alpharetta, Georgia (a suburb of Atlanta). The mall opened on October 20, 1993 as one of the largest shopping malls in the country. The mall was the second-to-last property built by Homart Development Company. The mall's anchor stores are Dillard's, JCPenney, Macy's, and Von Maur.

== History ==
Homart Development Company announced plans for North Point Mall on April 20, 1989. The mall was set to feature 400,000 square feet of gross leasable space and accommodate 120 to 140 stores.

The mall opened on October 20, 1993. Initial anchor stores were Sears, JCPenney, Rich's, Mervyn's, and Lord & Taylor. The Rich's store contained distinctive historical decorative elements from the chain's flagship location in downtown Atlanta, which had closed two years earlier. Macy's was a planned anchor tenant, but due to its bankruptcy, Macy's dropped out, leaving the sixth anchor pad vacant.

In 1995, the mall began an expansion project that added a sixth anchor tenant, Dillard's, along with a new parking deck. The following year, Mervyn's closed. Parisian opened in its place.

A significant renovation took place in 2003, modernizing the mall's interior and adding more seating areas, as well as an Apple Store. In 2004, an escalator was relocated from the East Court in front of Starbucks to the Sears wing.

In June 2004, The Cheesecake Factory opened its third Georgia location and first location outside of Atlanta. The store is located in the mall parking lot just beyond the parking deck. A walking path known as the "yellow brick road" connects the restaurant to the mall's Center Court.

In 2005, Lord & Taylor closed. Parisian closed in September 2007, after being acquired by Belk. Instead of occupying the former Parisian space, however, Belk chose to reopen in the previous Lord & Taylor location. Belk exited the mall in 2009.

In October 2010, Von Maur began renovating the two-story former Belk space, expanding it from 115,000 square feet (10,700 m²) to 140,000 square feet (13,000 m²). The new design featured reddish brick, a cupola, and columns, reflecting the architectural style of Georgia and the South. The remodeled store opened in November 2011.

In 2012, AMC Theatres demolished the former Parisian store and built a new 12-screen theater, which opened in September 2012.

In April 2014, Apple announced it would close its North Point location and move to the Avalon.

Sears closed in 2018. Shortly afterward, Brookfield revealed plans to demolish the former Sears location to make way for a mixed-use development.

In February 2019, the Alpharetta City Council approved plans for an 83-acre enhanced development on the northeast side of the mall. The project was set to include apartments, restaurants, new retail spaces, small parks and trails, a rock wall, a play fountain, and a lake. As part of the redevelopment, the former Sears building was slated for demolition, and the existing playground inside the mall was to be expanded. Following the approval, Alpharetta Mayor Jim Gilvin remarked, "If you do it right, it's going to be special." However, the plans ultimately fell through.

In 2019, several of the mall's interior atriums were modernized with new seating areas and updated flooring, along with the addition of an LED color-changing tree.

On November 19, 2021, Dino Safari opened on the second floor of the former Sears store.

In March 2022, Brookfield Properties sold the mall to Trademark Properties, resulting in the shopping center's rebranding as North Point. Plans were announced to redevelop the former Sears space into apartments, restaurants, new retail areas, and small parks, but these plans were abandoned after a contentious city council meeting.

Dino Safari closed its location in October 2023.

In March 2024, Alpharetta Sports & Entertainment, led by former National Hockey League player Anson Carter, proposed a redevelopment of the North Point Mall site, anchored by an NHL-sized arena as part of an effort to bring the NHL back to the Atlanta metropolitan area. Carter's bid for an NHL franchise is in competition with The Gathering at South Forsyth, located near the Forsyth–Fulton County line approximately six miles (10 km) north of the North Point Mall. In late February 2026, the mall's ownership entered an agreement with real estate management firm Jamestown L.P. and sports developer Machete Group to redevelop the North Point Mall.

In February 2026 and March 2024, the Lego Store and Great American Cookie Company inside the mall closed.

In April 2026, Chick-fil-A inside the food court closed After 33 years.

On August 23rd, 2026 the city council finally approved the redevelopment of the mall. the plan calls for an NHL anchored mixed use entertainment district connected to a Bus Rapid Transit station on the Georgia 400 express Lanes.

== Carousel ==
A carousel that sits behind a floor-to-ceiling window in the food court was crafted in Brooklyn, New York by the Fabricon Carousel Company. The carousel's hand-painted fiberglass animals were modeled after those of a vintage Victorian carousel on Coney Island. It was shipped to Atlanta in December 1992 (originally to be displayed in the Perimeter Mall) and sat in a warehouse near Duluth for 8 months. On August 1, 1993, it was brought to the then-uncompleted North Point Mall and was assembled in a huge, unfinished, high-ceiling room that is now known as the Food Court. Shoppers saw it operate for the first time a few weeks after the grand opening. The carousel was supposed to have been the centerpiece of the mall; however, due to a broken part, it did not operate until a few weeks after the opening day of the mall. Due to the COVID-19 pandemic and the lack of customers, the carousel closed in March 2020. It reopened in November 2023. The carousel's normal operating hours are from 12 PM to 6 PM on Sundays through Thursdays, and 12 PM to 7 PM on Fridays and Saturdays.
