= The Gathering at South Forsyth =

Mixed-use development in Georgia, United States

- Interactive map of The Gathering at South Forsyth
- Address: 1595 Union Hill Road
- Location: Alpharetta, Georgia (Note: Mailing address; the development site is physically located in unincorporated Forsyth County.)
- Coordinates: 34.103462°N 84.234447°W
- Operator: Krause Sports & Entertainment
- Capacity: 18,500
- Type: Arena

Construction
- Groundbreaking: TBD
- Opened: TBD
- Cost: $700 million
- Architect: FRCH Design Worldwide
- Project manager: ASM Global

Website
- thegatheringatsouthforsyth.com

The Gathering at South Forsyth is a proposed mixed-use development in the Atlanta metropolitan area to be located in Forsyth County, Georgia near the city of Alpharetta. The centerpiece of the development is an 18,000-seat indoor arena, intended to bring a National Hockey League franchise back to the Atlanta area.

The Gathering at South Forsyth is modeled after The Battery Atlanta, a mixed-use development in Cobb County anchored by Truist Park, home of the Atlanta Braves of Major League Baseball.

== History ==
In 2023, rumors of an NHL team returning to Atlanta began to emerge from ESPN analyst John Buccigross as hints were dropped about Atlanta coming back to the NHL for the first time since the Atlanta Thrashers left in 2011.

On April 17, 2023, Vernon Krause, an Atlanta area businessman and CEO of Krause Sports & Entertainment, announced plans to build an entertainment center called The Gathering at South Forsyth which includes an arena built for a potential NHL team. The Gathering is planned to be built on an undeveloped 100-acre (40 ha) tract of land originally zoned for a shopping center at the intersection of Ronald Reagan Boulevard and Union Hill Road, off Georgia State Route 400 near the Forsyth–Fulton County line. If built, the arena would sit 18,000 for hockey and 20,000 for concerts. A week later, on April 25, the Forsyth County Board approved plans to move forward with the project.

Then in December 2023, fellow ESPN analyst Kevin Weekes revealed more details on The Gathering at South Forsyth which said the plans would move forward. In January 2024, The county commissioners voted 4 to 1 to move plans forward again on the massive complex which would cost $2 billion; the county also approved upwards of $390 million of public funds towards the project on the condition that Krause secures an NHL franchise. Krause held a public forum on the Forsyth campus of Lanier Technical College on March 19, 2024, seeking input from Forsyth County residents regarding The Gathering development ahead of the Forsyth County Board of Commissioners meeting the following week. Although the Board of Commissioners approved a revised memorandum of understanding during their March 26 meeting, which included reducing the county's maximum contribution for the project to $225 million, Krause expressed disappointment over last-minute changes to the MOU.

In March 2024, details on the cost of the arena came out which said that the arena would cost $700 million and that ASM Global would manage the arena, a group that has managed other arenas such as, T-Mobile Arena and Crypto.com Arena. In the November 2024 general elections, residents of Forsyth County voted 56–44 in favor of granting the county redevelopment powers over The Gathering at South Forsyth, creating a tax allocation district to repay the county's bonds towards the project.

Also in March 2024, former NHL player Anson Carter and his new group Alpharetta Sports & Entertainment revealed a competing bid for a potential Atlanta NHL expansion team; Carter's proposal would be located at the site of the North Point Mall, six miles (10 km) south of The Gathering at South Forsyth site.

On May 7, 2025, in an interview with WXIA-TV, Krause stated that his group are finalizing their plans to present to the league towards expansion. Two days later, during a press conference during the 2025 Stanley Cup Playoffs, in Game 3 between the Toronto Maple Leafs and Florida Panthers in Sunrise, Florida, NHL commissioner Gary Bettman commented that while the league is open to returning to Atlanta, the NHL is unlikely to open the expansion process before a new collective bargaining agreement with the National Hockey League Players' Association is reached.

In June 2025, the Forsyth County Board of Commissioners, Board of Education and the development authority approved and finalised various documents and intergovernmental agreements related to construction of the arena. The project would be carried out in four phases over three to four years, with the first phase to include construction of the arena, and later phases including residential units, office, and retail space. The total cost of the project would be $3 billion.
