= Kungsportsplatsen =

Square in Gothenburg, Sweden

Coordinates: 57°42′16″N 11°58′11″E

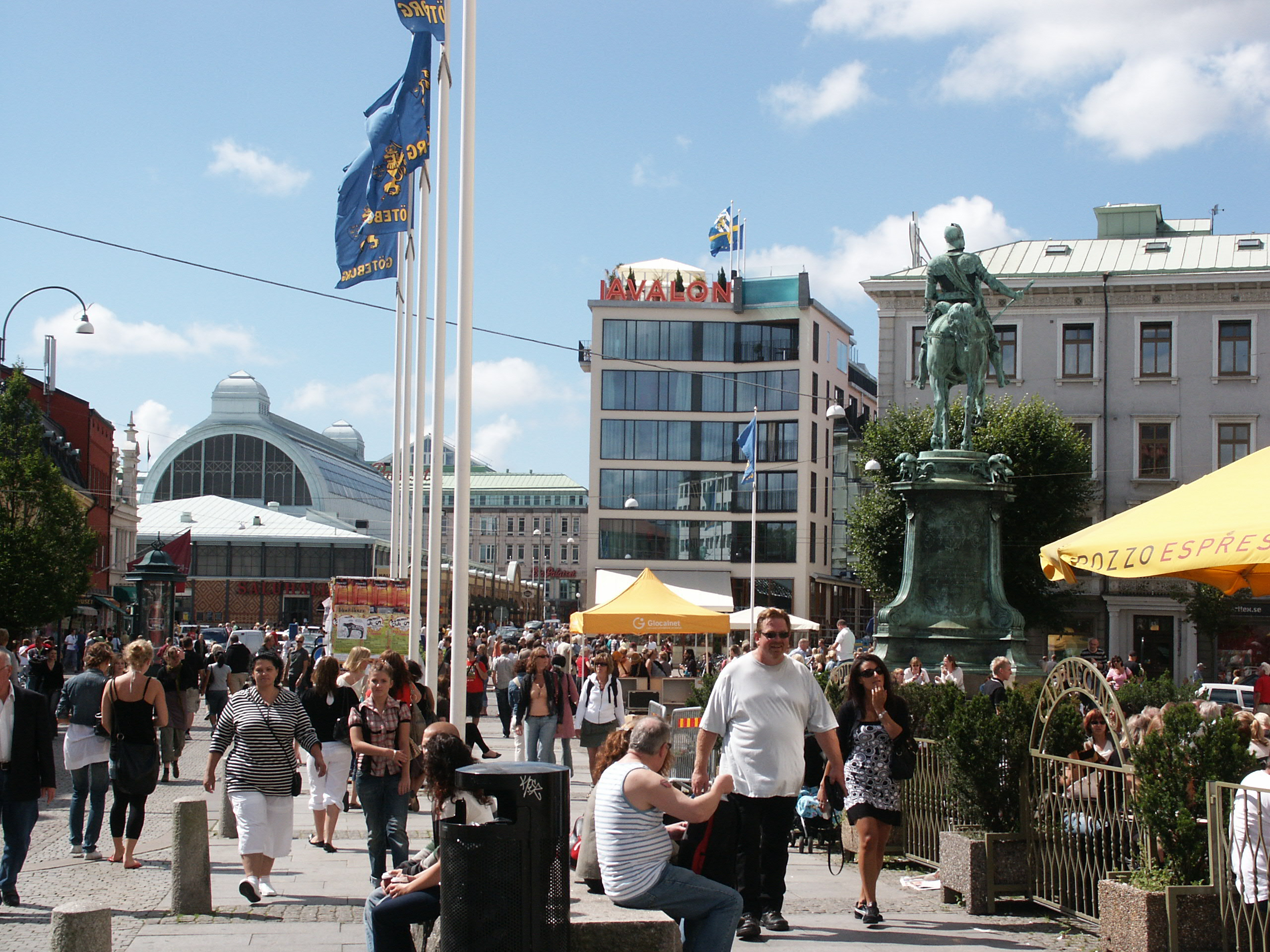
The Kungsporten square towards Saluhallen and Avalon Hotel

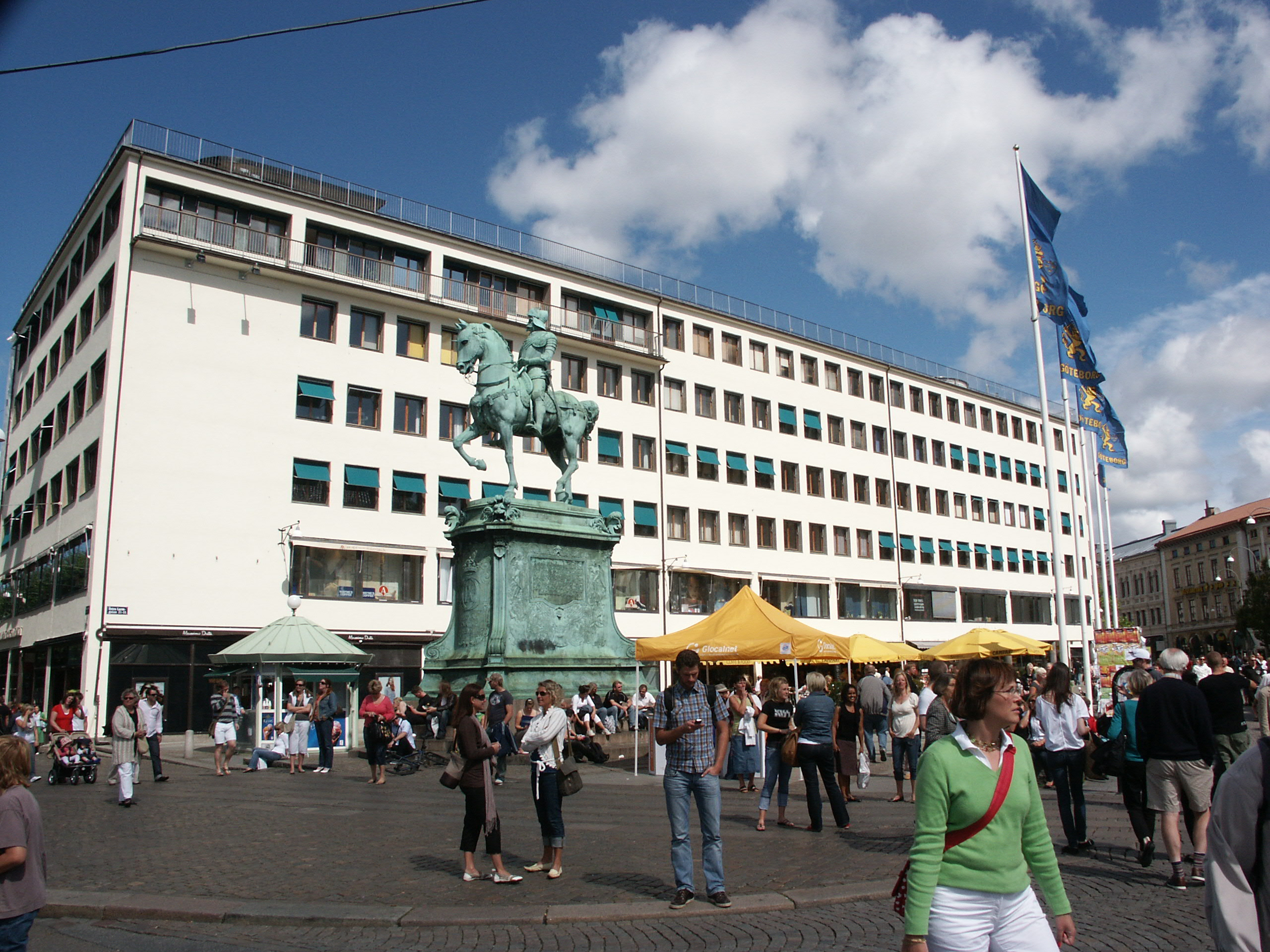
The Kungsporten square with the statue of Charles IX

Kungsportsplatsen is a square in the city centre of Gothenburg, Sweden. The square was constructed in 1852 and got its name after the King's Gate (the name literally means, King's Gate Place). The gate was the main entrance to the fortified city, which was and still is surrounded by a moat. When the city grew outside the moat and there was no need to defend the city any longer the gate was torn down.

At Kungsportsplatsen there is a statue of King Charles IX, which was placed there in 1936.

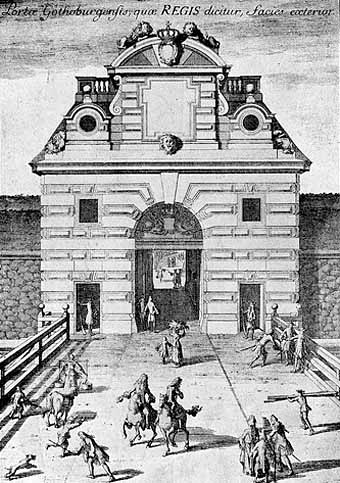
The King's gate
