= Dickey Mountain =

Mountain in New Hampshire, United States

Coordinates: 43°55′22″N 71°34′43″W

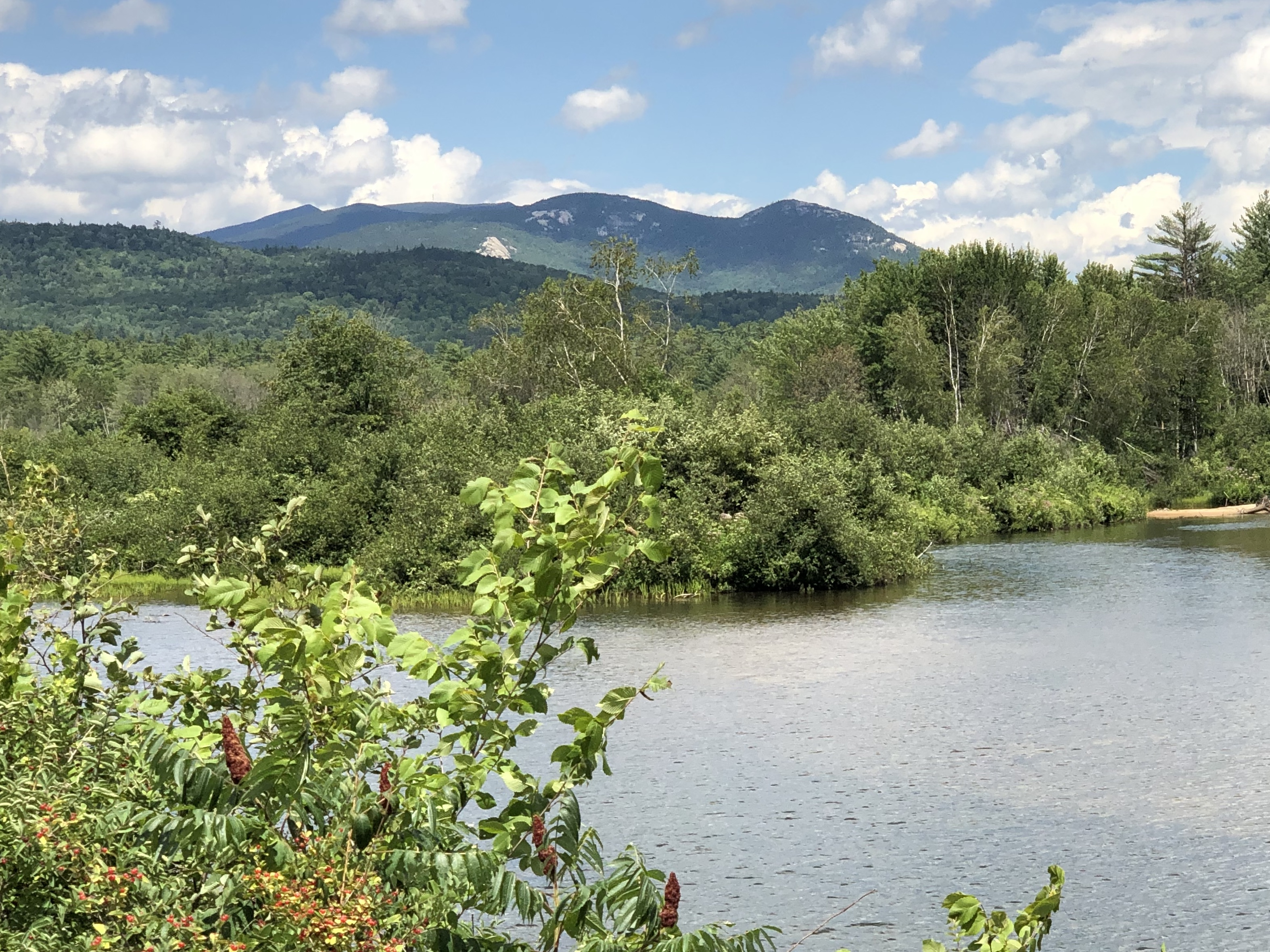
Dickey Mountain (center) and Welch Mountain (right) from Campton, New Hampshire

Dickey Mountain is a mountain in Thornton, New Hampshire, United States. It is part of the White Mountains and has a summit that is 2,734 feet (833 m) above sea level. The mountain has an exposed summit which is accessible via the Welch-Dickey trail, a 4.4-mile (7.1 km) loop which also crosses Welch Mountain. It is one of five places in New Hampshire which is home to the jack pine.
