= Avalon Theater =

Avalon Theater or Theatre may refer to:

== Australia ==
- Avalon Theatre, Hobart, Tasmania

== United States ==
- Avalon Theater (Catalina), California; now known as Catalina Casino
- Avalon Theatre (Easton, Maryland)
- Avalon Theater (Brooklyn), New York
- Avalon Theater (Larimore, North Dakota), listed on the National Register of Historic Places
- Avalon Theatre (Portland, Oregon), a movie theatre
- Avalon Theatre (Washington, D.C.), listed on the National Register of Historic Places
