= Otherworld (comics) =

Otherworld, in comics, may refer to:

- Avalon (Marvel Comics), a Marvel Comics location, also known as Otherworld
- Otherworld (DC Comics), a creator-owned Vertigo series by Phil Jimenez

== See also ==
- Otherworld (disambiguation)
- Otherplace, Marvel Comics demonic limbo
- Avalon (comics)
