= List of ships named Avalon =

A number of ships have been named Avalon, after Avalon, the mythical Arthurian island or Avalon, California

== Merchant ships ==
- Avalon (1864), a Great Eastern Railway passenger ferry steamer, sold as a blockade runner
- Avalon (1865), a Great Eastern Railway passenger-cargo ferry steamer, replaced the above
- Avalon (1888), a cargo ship, built by Swan Hunter, Wallsend for C T Bowring
- Avalon (1888), a sidewheel passenger ship, built by Harlan and Hollingsworth
- Avalon (1891), a passenger vessel, operating Catalina–Los Angeles 1920–1951
- Avalon (1945), a cargo ship 1974–1981, built as Empire Wallace
- Avalon (1963), a passenger-roro ferry built by Alexander Stephen & Sons, Glasgow for British Railways
- Avalon (1963), a passenger-cargo ship previously known as RMS St Helena

== Naval ships ==
=== United States Navy ===
- USS Avalon (1908), a motorboat acquired for use as a patrol boat in 1917 and returned to her owner in 1918 perhaps without having been commissioned
- USS Blue Ridge (ID-2432), a steamer in commission from 1918 to 1919, renamed USS Avalon for her last three days under U.S. Navy control
- DSRV-2 Avalon, a deep submergence rescue vehicle launched in 1971 and decommissioned in 2000

=== Canadian Navy ===
- HMCS Avalon was a shore base at St. John's, Newfoundland during World War II
- HMCS Avalon II, an accommodation vessel from 1942 to 1947, previously passenger vessel Georgian ex-Cape Eternity ex-Rochester on the Great Lakes and St Lawrence
- HMCS Avalon III, a harbour vessel, later HC 31

=== Royal Navy ===
- HMT Avalon, former Norwegian trawler Nordhav I, hired in 1940, and renamed Adonis in 1941. Built as Océan in 1915

== See also ==
- Avalon (disambiguation)
