= North Moat Mountain =

Mountain in New Hampshire, United States

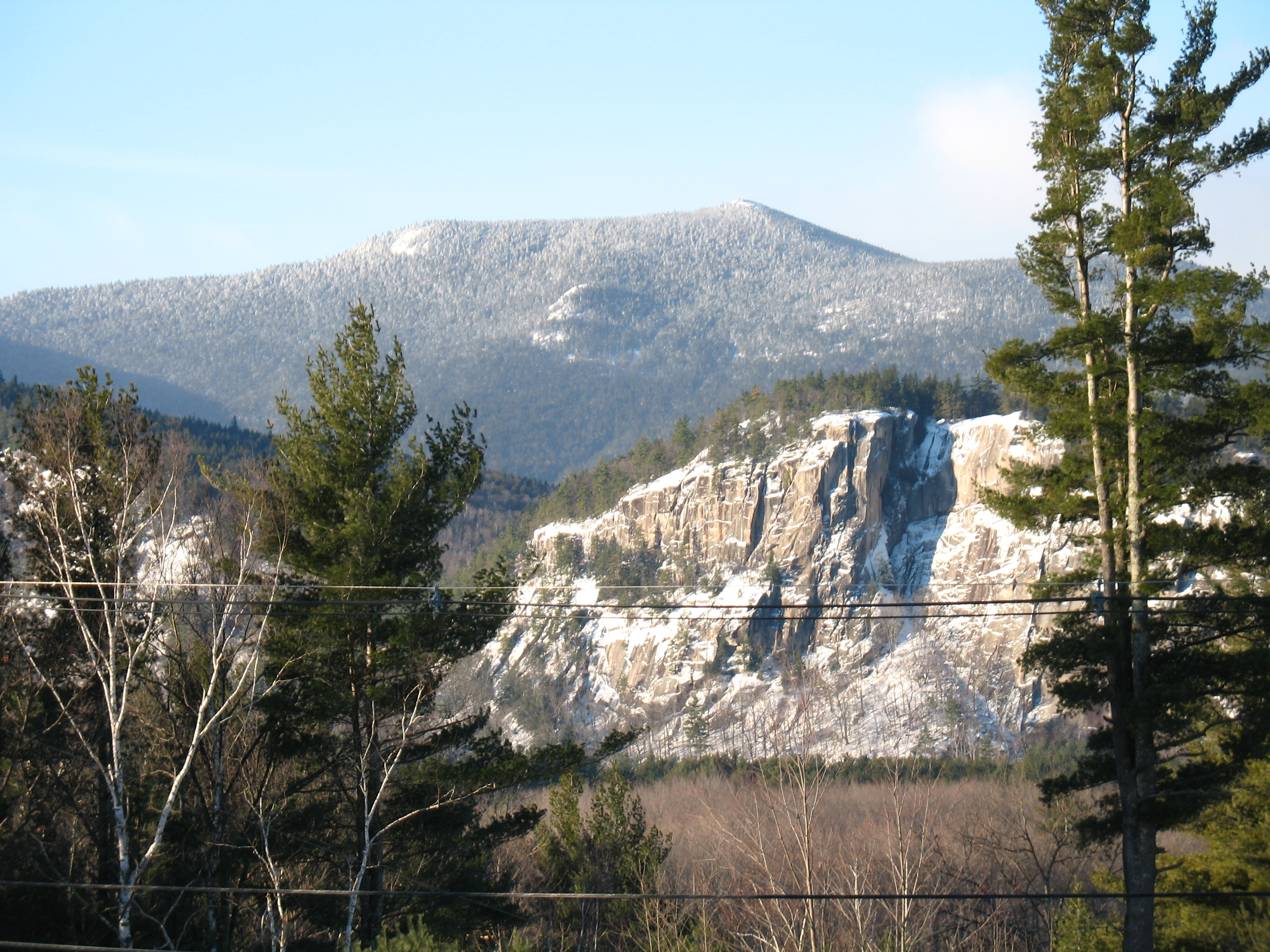
- North Moat Mountain, looking southwest from Intervale. Cathedral Ledge cliff is in right middleground.

Highest point
- Elevation: 974 m (3,196 ft)
- Prominence: 320 m (1,050 ft)
- Coordinates: 44°2.59′N 71°12.88′W

Geography
- Location: Carroll County, New Hampshire, U.S.
- Topo map: USGS North Conway West

North Moat Mountain is a mountain located in Carroll County, New Hampshire. North Moat is flanked to the south by Middle Moat Mountain, and to the west by Big Attitash Mountain.

North Moat Mountain stands within the watershed of the upper Saco River, which drains into the Gulf of Maine at Saco, Maine. The northwest side of North Moat Mtn. drains into Lucy Brook, thence into the Saco River. The east side of North Moat drains into Moat Brook, thence into the Saco. The southwest side of North Moat drains into Deer Brook, thence into the Swift River, a tributary of the Saco.

== See also ==
- List of mountains of New Hampshire
- White Mountain National Forest
