= Carr Mountain (New Hampshire) =

Mountain in New Hampshire, United States

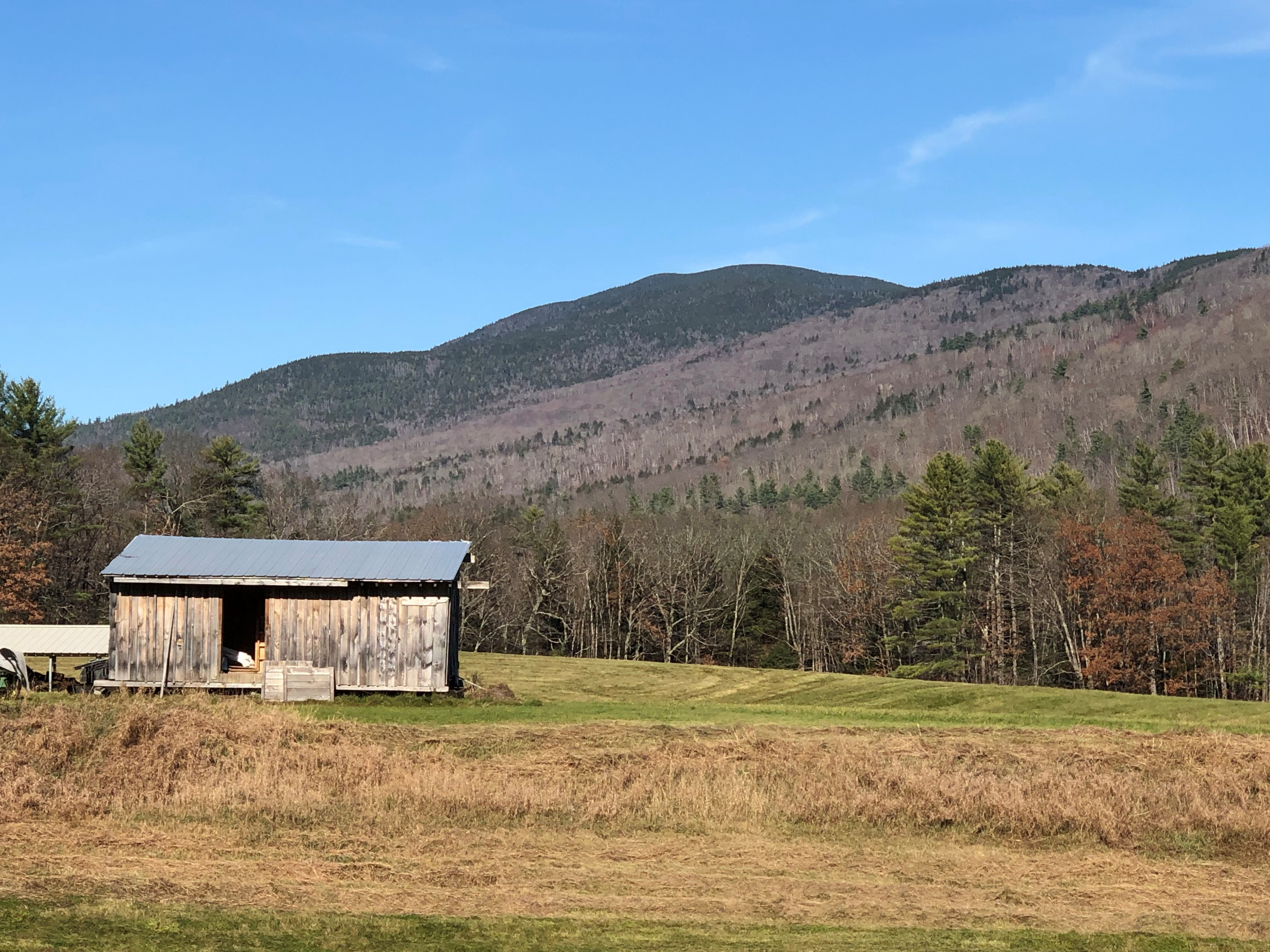
- Carr Mountain as seen from NH 25 in West Rumney, NH

Highest point
- Elevation: 3,453 ft (1,052 m)
- Prominence: 1,480 ft (450 m)
- Coordinates: 43°53′06″N 71°50′37″W

Geography
- Location: Grafton County, New Hampshire, U.S.
- Parent range: White Mountains
- Topo map: USGS Mount Kineo

Carr Mountain is a 3,453-foot-high (1,052 m) mountain in the southwestern part of the White Mountains in the towns of Wentworth and Warren, New Hampshire, United States. It is the highest of a set of mountains ringed by Interstate 93 to the east, New Hampshire Route 25 to the south and west, New Hampshire Route 118 to the northwest, and New Hampshire Route 112 to the north, and that are in the White Mountain National Forest.

The mountain forms a ridge in the northeast corner of the town of Wentworth and extends north into the southeast corner of Warren. It is drained to the west by Patch Brook, Hurricane Brook, Clifford Brook, Martins Brook, and Currier Brook, all flowing to the Baker River, while to the east it is drained by Sucker Brook and other tributaries of Stinson Brook, which flows south to the Baker River. The entire mountain is part of the Pemigewasset River watershed, flowing south to the Merrimack River and ultimately the Gulf of Maine. The Three Ponds area is at the northeast base of the mountain.

The mountain is accessible from the east and the west by the Carr Mountain Trail, maintained by the White Mountain National Forest.

== See also ==
- List of mountains of New Hampshire
