= The Avalon (Birmingham, Alabama) =

- Avalon
- U.S. National Register of Historic Places
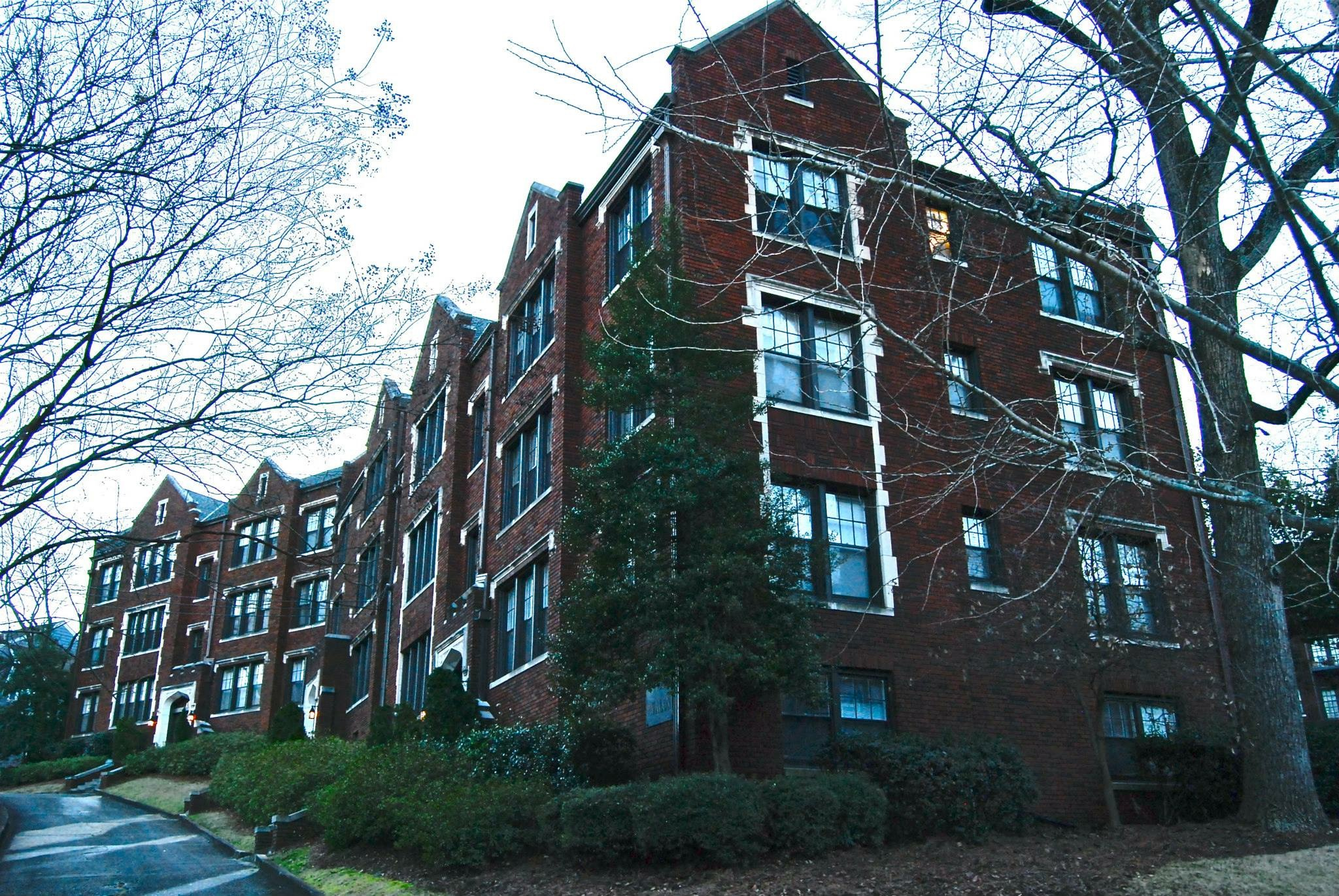

- Location within Alabama
- Location: 3005-3015 Highland Ave. and 3000-3020 13th Ave. S, Birmingham, Alabama
- Coordinates: 33°30′18″N 86°46′48″W
- Area: 1.3 acres (0.53 ha)
- Built: 1925, 1927
- Architect: Charles H. McCauley
- Architectural style: Tudor Revival
- NRHP reference No.: 85000444
- Added to NRHP: March 7, 1985

The Avalon in Birmingham, Alabama, United States, is a two-building Tudor Revival-style complex at 3005–3015 Highland Avenue. and 3000–3020 13th Avenue South, which was built in 1925 and 1927. It was listed on the National Register of Historic Places in 1985.

It was designed by architect Charles H. McCauley for the Birmingham Realty Company, successor firm to the Elyton Land Company, which was major in designing the layout of the city of Birmingham and which built Highland Avenue.
