= Avalon Guitars =

Musical instrument company based in Newtownards, Northern Ireland

- Industry: Musical instruments
- Founded: 1989; 37 years ago
- Headquarters: Newtownards, County Down, Northern Ireland
- Area served: Worldwide
- Key people: John McCartin
- Products: Acoustic guitars
- Owner: John McCartin
- Website: avalonguitars.com

Avalon Guitars is a British/Irish musical instrument company based in Newtownards, Northern Ireland. Avalon produces a wide range of steel-string acoustic guitars.

== History ==
The company, "Avalon Guitars Limited", was originally formed in 1989 as The Lowden Guitar Company Limited and operated from Bangor, County Down until 1990. From 1989 until 2003, Avalon produced approximately 15,000 Lowden acoustic guitars and for a brief period from 1992 to 1996 also produced a solid body electric bass guitar under the name Goodfellow. The Goodfellow brand was sold to the Shinseido Corp. of Japan in 1996 to allow the company to focus exclusively on making high quality handmade acoustic guitars using traditional methodology.

The workshops in Newtownards were purpose built to facilitate the traditional approach to luthiery adopted by Avalon (then Lowden Guitar Co.); the facility was laid out in the pattern of specialised Japanese guitar makers by the then Technical Manager Mitsuhiro Uchida - now one of Japan's foremost luthiers. Uchida also trained the apprentice luthiers, several of whom went on to develop their own guitar design talents which contributed significantly to the development of Avalon Guitars.

Due to limitations in the design licence agreement relating to Lowden Guitars, none of the company's luthiers were permitted to contribute design ideas to the development of the company's product range. To rectify this situation, the company created the Avalon Guitars brand in 2000 and invited design input from the group of the most experienced guitar makers working for the company at that time. The new range, called the Avalon Gold series, was launched in 2002. The first reviews of the range (Guitarist magazine (UK), April 2002; Guitar Buyer magazine (UK), June 2002; Total Guitar magazine (UK), June 2002) highly commended the range for its build quality and tonal excellence.

In 2012, Avalon announced that it would be going into liquidation.

But three months later in September 2012, the company was bought out of liquidation and resumed trading as Avalon Custom Lutherie Ltd. The newly formed Avalon Guitar Company was the feature of a photography essay by David Cleland in 2013 with the images being used by a number of publications.

== Product developments ==
In response to the mass market development in guitar manufacturing made possible by advances in wood working technologies such as CNC, laser cutting and UV lacquer curing, the company designed and introduced a mass market version, named the Avalon Silver series and built in Korea.

Production of the Avalon Gold series was momentarily transferred to Furch Guitars facility in the Czech Republic to allow Avalon's luthiers to concentrate exclusively on high end custom acoustic guitars.

Meanwhile, it was reported in the UK's Guitar & Bass magazine in 2006 that the Avalon Guitars luthiers in Ireland were making the very high-end Zemaitis acoustic guitars

Avalon discontinued all offshore produced models in 2007 to concentrate exclusively on making high-end handcrafted acoustic guitars from its workshop in Northern Ireland.

=== Acoustic Guitar Body Shape formats used by Avalon ===
- Dreadnought (D)
- Concert (S)
- Grand Auditorium (A)
- Jumbo (L)

=== Product range ===
The Avalon Guitars product range comprises the following series:

- Americana Series
- Pioneer Series
- Ard Rí Series
- Arc Series
- Fusion Series

== Artists who play Avalon Guitars ==
Avalon Guitars are played by several globally recognised artists including Jan Akkerman, Def Leppard, Bob Geldof, Nik Kershaw, James Morrison, Tom Baxter, Sinéad O'Connor, Bruce Springsteen, Terry Lewis, Van Morrison, Andy McKee, David Gray, The Corrs, Katie Melua, The Band Perry, Chris Tomlin, Michael Hedges, Albert Lee, Marco R. Wagner, Bob Weir, and Ben Kyle.
