= Alpharetta Sports & Entertainment =

American sports company based in Atlanta

- Type: Private
- Industry: Professional sports, property management, entertainment
- Founded: March 12, 2024
- Key people: Anson Carter; Neil Leibman; Peter Simon; Aaron Zeigler
- Owner: Anson Carter

Alpharetta Sports & Entertainment (ASE) is an American company based in Alpharetta, Georgia. This group was formed by former National Hockey League player Anson Carter, in order to bring an NHL team back to Atlanta for the first time since the Atlanta Thrashers relocated to Winnipeg in 2011.

== History ==
=== Background ===
In 2011, after years of ownership issues and bad management, the Atlanta Thrashers were bought by True North Sports and Entertainment and relocated to Winnipeg, becoming the second iteration of the Winnipeg Jets.

8 years after the Thrashers' relocation, in 2019, former NHL player Anson Carter met with NHL commissioner Gary Bettman to begin talks on bringing the NHL back to Atlanta. However, since 2022, rumors of Atlanta returning to the NHL began to heat up with the ECHL's Atlanta Gladiators, of which Carter owns a minority stake, drawing over 10,000 fans for Thrashers Night. A competing bid, led by Atlanta-area businessman Vernon Krause and based in Forsyth County, announced their intentions to get an NHL team in the area with a brand new arena, The Gathering at South Forsyth.

=== Formation ===
On March 12, 2024, Carter officially announced the creation of Alpharetta Sports and Entertainment and that they had sent a request to the NHL to begin the expansion process. With this announcement, ASE also promised to build an NHL arena on the North Point Mall location.

In early May 2025, the city of Alpharetta's Convention and Visitors Bureau and ASE approved jointly funding a feasibility study, commissioning sports consulting firm CAA ICON, to see if the city could support an NHL franchise and if redeveloping the North Point Mall makes financial sense.
