= Avalon Theater (Larimore, North Dakota) =

- U.S. National Register of Historic Places
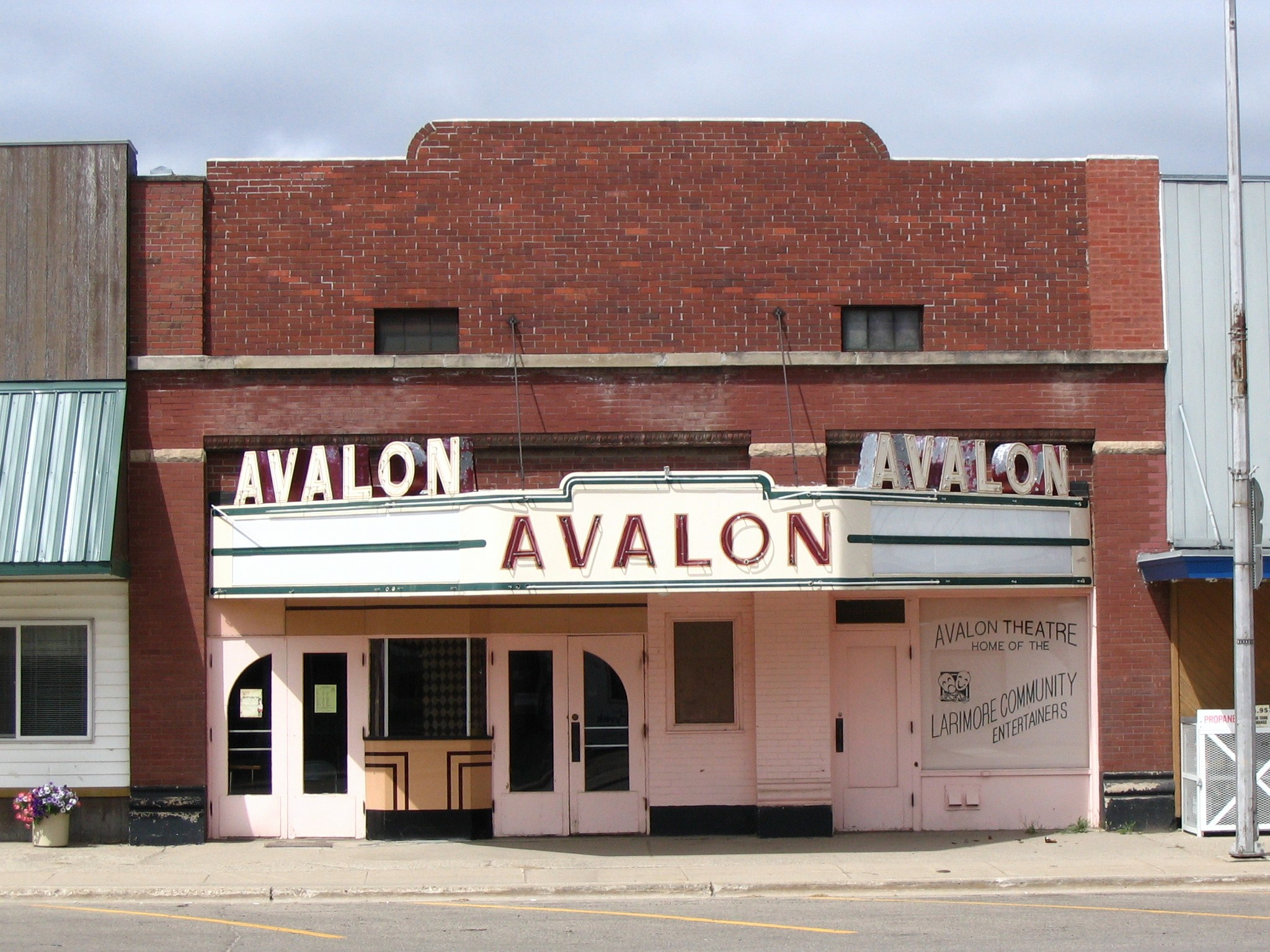

- Location within North Dakota Location within the United States
- Location: 210 Towner Ave., Larimore, North Dakota
- Coordinates: 47°54′19″N 97°37′25″W
- Area: less than 1 acre (0.40 ha)
- Built: 1938
- Architect: Jensted, Emil; Tingum, David, Sr.
- Architectural style: Art Deco
- NRHP reference No.: 90002191
- Added to NRHP: February 4, 1991

The Avalon Theater is a Historic Art Deco style Movie theater located in the commercial district of Larimore, North Dakota, United States. Built in 1938 as a 350-seat theater, the Avalon's most significant feature is its Art Deco detailing, especially the marquee, box office, and entry doors and continuing with simple Art Deco geometry motifs in the interior, all of which has survived. The building is constructed of brick with a parabolic poured concrete floor in the seating area to ensure a good view for all. The building still functions as a movie theater, with its original projectors, and also is home to local live theater groups.

The Avalon Theater is historically significant as a rare example of Art Deco theaters built during the Great Depression. It is part of a vanishing genre of small town movie houses, and is the only remaining Art Deco building in Larimore.

The Avalon Theater played Broadway Serenade on its opening night, April 28, 1939.

== History ==
The site of the Avalon Theatre was originally occupied by the Arnold Block, a two-story 75 by 100 ft. brick building with cut stone trimmings. Horace F. Arnold commissioned architect Joseph Bell DeRemer to design the building and it was completed in 1905. The Arnold block was destroyed by fire in 1938. The Avalon Theatre and an adjoining store were built in the shell of the building's remains which was given several architectural updates but retained some of the 1905 building's elements.
