= Mount Avalon =

Mountain in New Hampshire, United States

Highest point
- Elevation: 3,442 ft (1,049 m)
- Prominence: 100 ft (30 m)
- Coordinates: 44°12′22″N 71°25′37″W

Geography
- Location: Bethlehem, Grafton County, New Hampshire, U.S.
- Parent range: White Mountains
- Topo map: USGS Crawford Notch

Climbing
- Easiest route: Hike

Mount Avalon is a 3,442-foot-high (1,049 m) mountain located in Grafton County, New Hampshire, United States. It is a small, rocky spur of Mount Field, overlooking Crawford Notch in the White Mountains. Avalon's summit is reached by a spur from the Mount Avalon Trail, which climbs to the summit of Mount Field.

The slopes of Mount Avalon drain to Crawford Brook, which flows north from Crawford Notch to the Ammonoosuc River, part of the Connecticut River watershed.

== See also ==
- List of mountains of New Hampshire
- White Mountain National Forest
