= Avalon Elementary School =

Avalon Elementary School may refer to:

- Avalon Elementary School, Michigan, United States — South Lake Schools
- Avalon Elementary School, Maryland, United States — Prince George's County Public Schools
- Avalon Elementary School, New Jersey, United States — Avalon School District
