= Omaha Knights =

Omaha Knights may refer to:

- Omaha Knights (AHA) an ice hockey team that played from (1939–1942) in the American Hockey Association and from (1945–1951) in the United States Hockey League
- Omaha Knights (IHL) an ice hockey team that played from (1959–1963) in the International Hockey League
- Omaha Knights (1963–1965) an ice hockey team that played from (1963–1965) in the Central Professional Hockey League
- Omaha Knights (1966–1975) an ice hockey team that played from (1966–1975) in the Central Hockey League
- Omaha Ak-Sar-Ben Knights an ice hockey team that played from (2005–2007) in the American Hockey League
