= Chateau Avalon =

Hotel in Kansas City, Kansas, US

Coordinates: 39°06′41″N 94°49′06″W

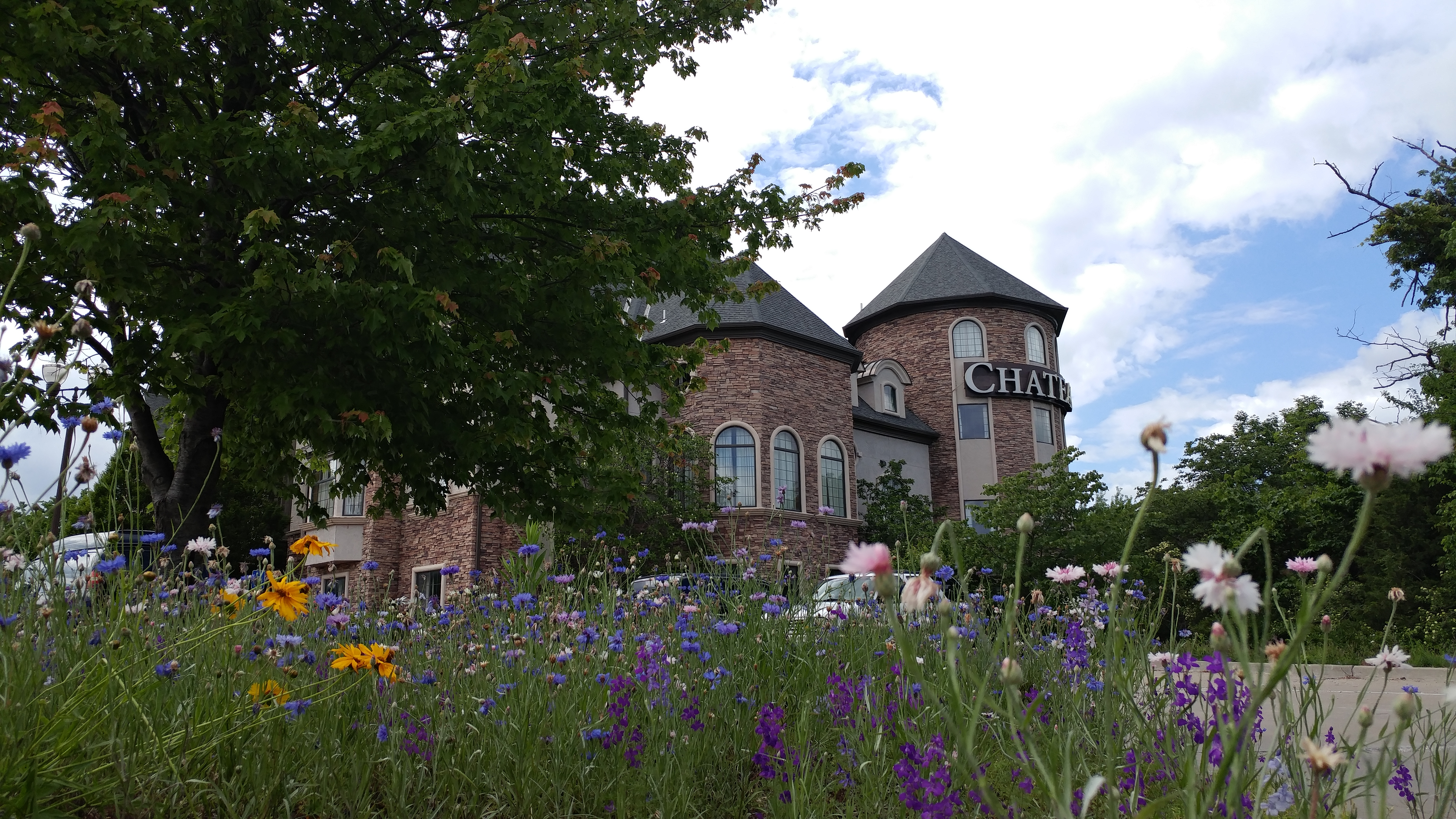
East of Chateau Avalon Hotel and Spa, with visible wildflowers

Chateau Avalon is a hotel located in Kansas City, Kansas. It began accepting reservations in June 2004. The hotel consists of 62 rooms divided into 23 different themed suites, categorized as Luxury, Adventure, and Classic.

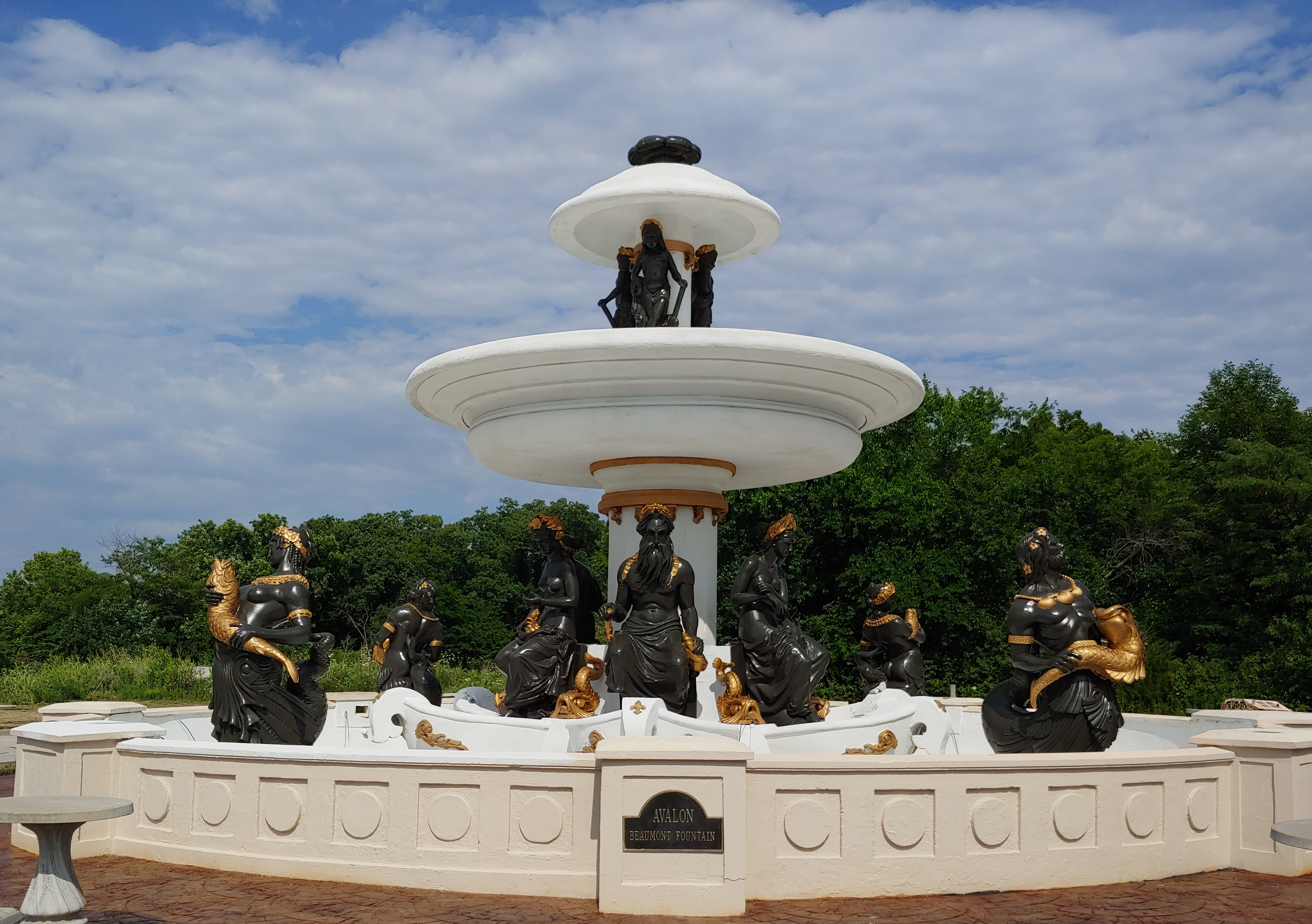
East of Beaumont Fountain, without water flowing

Located on the east side of Chateau Avalon, the Beaumont Fountain is named after Steve Beaumont, the hotel's creator. It is recognized as the largest structural fountain in Kansas City, a city known for its many fountains. Construction of the fountain lasted one year, and it was completed in August 2006.
