= Avalon (Alpharetta, Georgia) =

Mixed-use development in Alpharetta, Georgia, US

Coordinates: 34.0706°N 84.2773°W

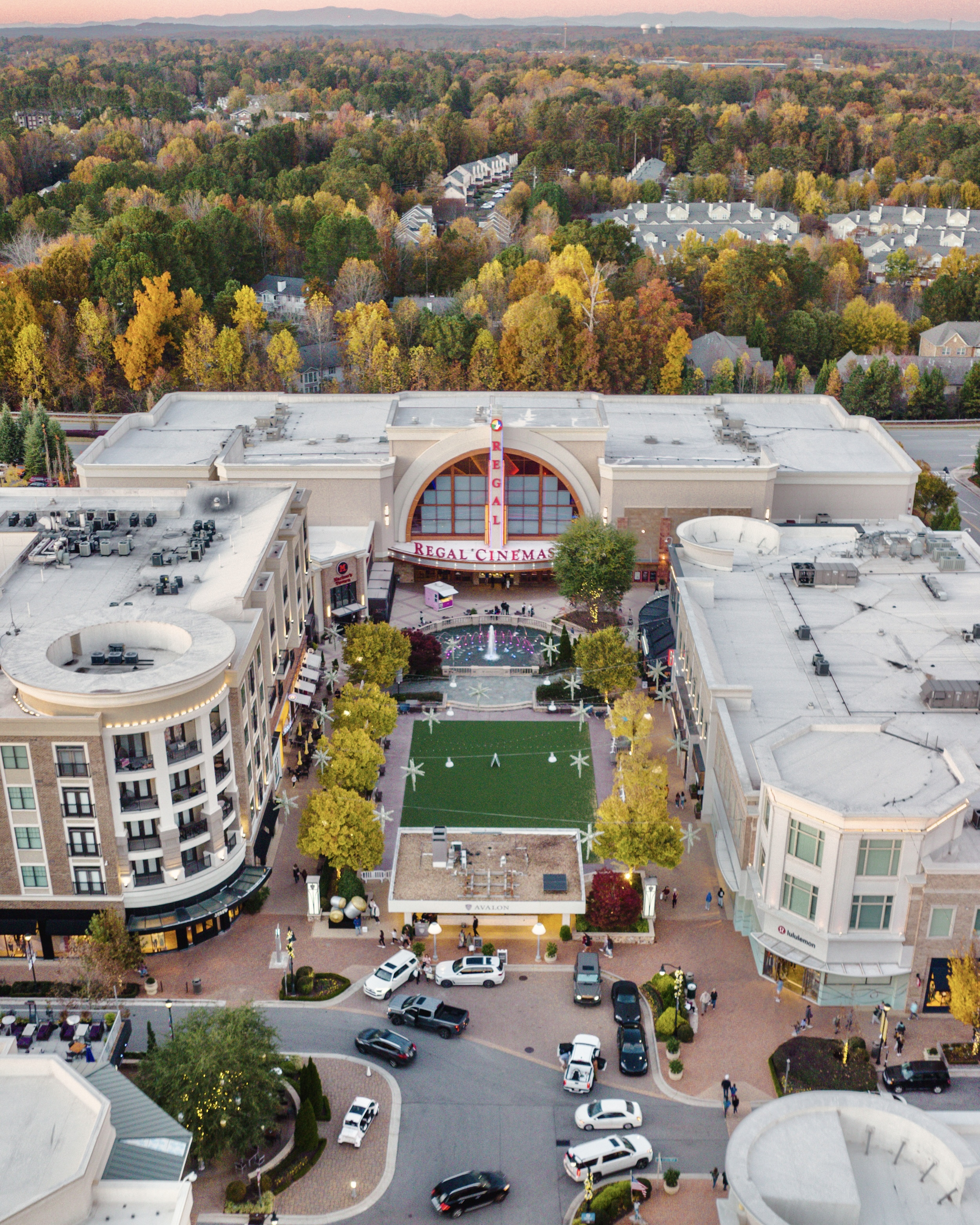
- Avalon - November 2021
- Interactive map of Avalon
- Location: Alpharetta, Georgia
- Address: 400 Avalon Blvd, Alpharetta, GA 30009
- Groundbreaking: January 28, 2013
- Opening: October 29, 2014
- Use: Mixed-use development
- Website: experienceavalon.com

Companies
- Architect: NELSON
- Owner: PGIM Real Estate

Technical details
- Cost: $600 million
- Size: 1.1-million sq. ft. (approx.)
- Proposed: April 23, 2012

Avalon is a mixed-use development in Alpharetta, Georgia. Phase I of the 86-acre (35 ha) site includes 500,000 square feet (46,000 m^{2}) of retail space, a 12-screen Regal Cinemas theater, 105,000 square foot of Class A office space over retail, 101 single-family residences and 250 luxury rental homes. Phase I opened In October 2014 drawing shoppers away from North Point Mall. Phase II, with additional business and residential space, opened in April 2017.

== History ==
The site of what is now Avalon was originally to be known as Prospect Park which construction stalled on in 2008. In 2011 the site was sold to North American Properties Atlanta (also known as "NAP"), who also owns and manages Atlantic Station in Atlanta. and "an experience in the timeless art of living well".

The Alpharetta City Council approved the project in April 2012, began construction on January 28, 2013, held the topping out for the project on April 23, 2014, and celebrated grand opening with multiple events October 29-November 2, 2014. Alpharetta City Council approved Phase II on October 28, 2014. Phase II opened in April 2017, adding 90,000 square feet of retail and restaurant space, 550,000 square feet of office space in two buildings, 276 multi-family units, and an Autograph Collection hotel and conference center with 325 rooms and 45,000 square feet of meeting space.

== Stores ==
Regal Cinemas, Whole Foods, Crate & Barrel, and The Container Store are the largest tenants at Avalon. The center has mostly high-end stores, a few of which do not have other locations within several hundred miles of the Atlanta Metropolitan Area. However, many of these stores also have intown locations at Phipps Plaza or Lenox Square in Buckhead. Some of these stores include Lilly Pulitzer, Peloton, Tommy Bahama, Vineyard Vines, and Free People. Other notable stores include Anthropologie, Apple, Banana Republic, Gap, J.Crew, L'Occitane, Lululemon, Pottery Barn, and Williams-Sonoma.

=== Office ===
In Phase I, Class A office space occupies 105,000 square feet over retail. As of January 2015, more than 62 percent of the office-over-retail has been leased. Tenants include Wakefield Beasley & Associates, Dental Town, OneSpring LLC, Hug & Associates and Integrated Care Management. Phase II included 550,000 square feet of Class A office space in two buildings.
