= Avalon School (Minnesota) =

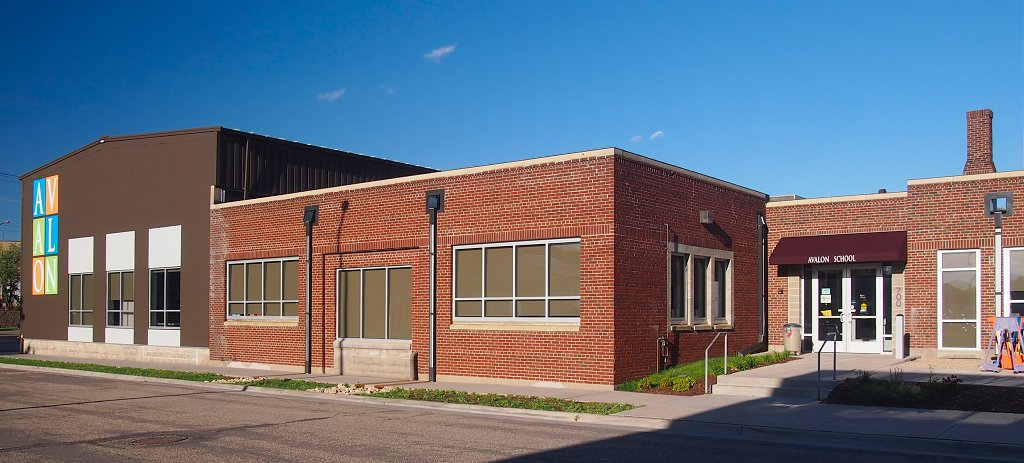
- Avalon School

Location
- Saint Paul, Minnesota; United States
- 44.9622°N 93.1985°W

Information
- Type: Charter school
- Motto: "Passion for Learning"
- Established: 2001
- Administrator: Gretchen Sage-Martinson and Carrie Bakken
- Grades: 6–12
- Enrollment: 275
- Campus: Urban
- Colors: Blue, Green, and Orange
- Mascot: Dragon
- Yearbook: Avalon School Yearbook
- Website: www.avalonschool.org

Avalon School is a project-based charter middle school and high school in Saint Paul, Minnesota, United States, at 700 Glendale Street. As a project-based school, students meet their academic graduation requirements through a combination of independent projects, group projects, and seminars. Students' schedules vary depending on the seminars they are enrolled in and the activities they are involved with. Students spend a significant part of each day working independently on projects. The school has a flat organizational structure with no principal or director in a position of power. The staff members work collaboratively to manage the school.

The school moved to its Glendale Street location in 2011, ten years after it was founded in 2001. The new location has expanded throughout the years adding a new middle school wing and office section, replacing parts of the surrounding buildings previously owned by TakeAction Minnesota. In 2025, construction and remodeling began to move the middle school wing upstairs and expand the high school area to where the middle school was.

== Advisors ==
In keeping with the non-hierarchical organizational structure, students call teachers "advisors" and students and staff are all on a first-name basis. Some of the advisors are leaders of a homeroom-like group of students, called advisories. Advisories are housed in classroom-sized areas including both open spaces and other advisory spaces that are separated from each other by cubicle walls. Advisories are spaces where students work on independent projects or other assignments for seminars. Each student has desk space they can decorate as they please.

== Seminars ==
Seminars are classes specifically tailored to Minnesota graduation standards although they are not usually traditional "Intro to Literature"-style courses. Instead, advisors get creative, teaching classes such as "Rights of Passage", "Southern Women Writers", "World Genocide", or "1950s Literature". Classes are usually small, but some (such as Economics) can be quite large. They are generally discussion-based and give the students quite a bit of control. Math seminars are offered for Algebra 1&2, Geometry, and Advanced Topics. Independent math is an option using the accelerated math program, PSEO, or another proposed method.

== Projects ==
Avalon is project-based, meaning the focus of the student's work is independent projects. If a student has an idea for a project, they must fill out a proposal form and rubric, get parent approval, and present their idea to their advisor. When the project has been completed, the student must do a reflection—a process of answering questions about the project's development, what they learned, and how this helps the world/community. It is then taken back to the advisor, who asks the student questions and uses a rubric to assess the grade.

== Student organizations and activities ==
Avalon has a number of organizations and activities, including the Library, the GSA, AAH, Congress, Green Team, the mentor program (where older students mentor new students), a peer mediator program, and Tech Committee. There are also activities that do not last throughout the school year, like drama and prom committee. Avalon won a national Promising Practices Award from the CEP for its Feminist Club.

== Avalon Middle School ==
Avalon added a middle school, which accepts students in grades 6 through 8.
