= Avalon Music =

- U.S. National Register of Historic Places
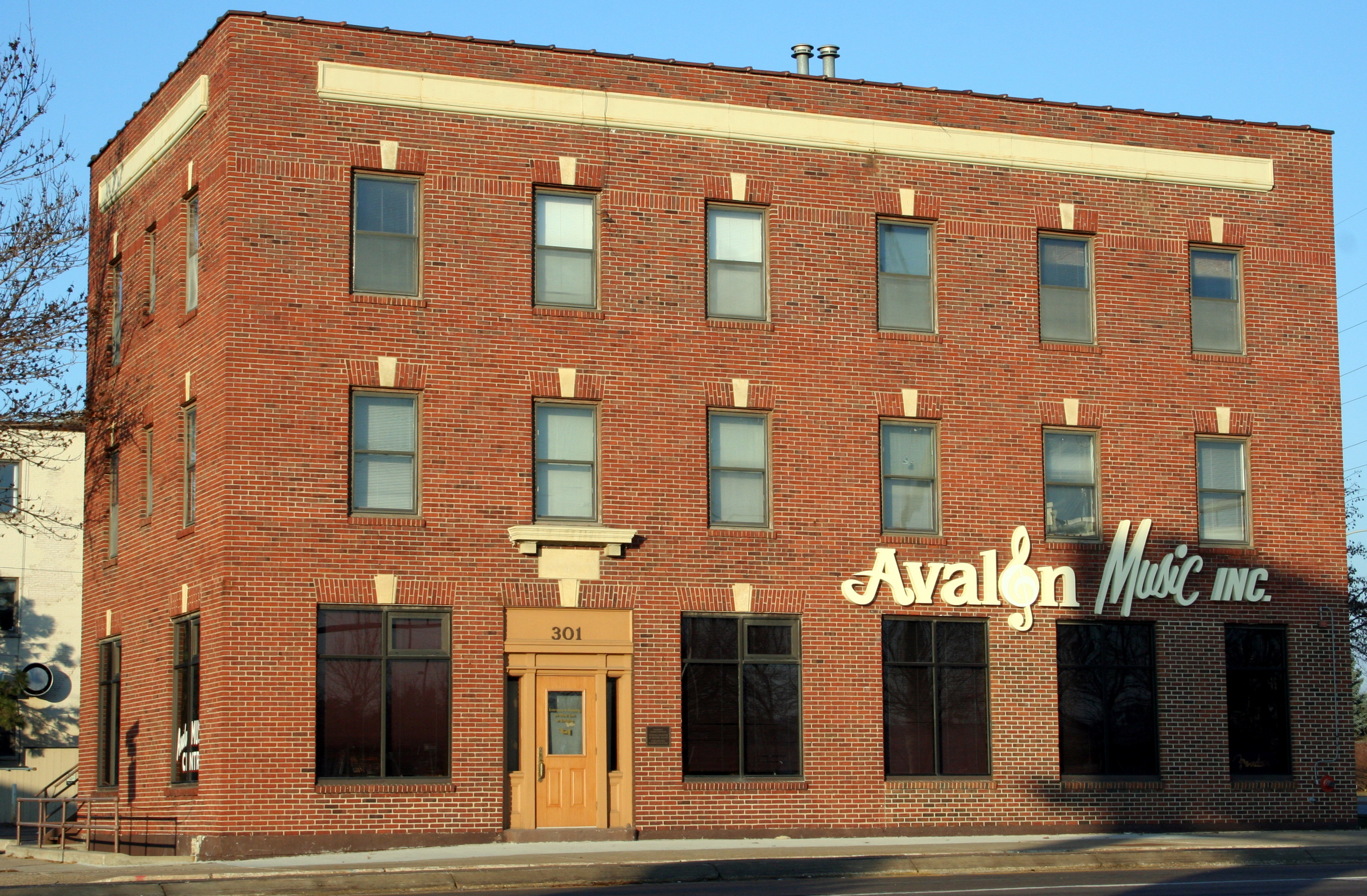
- Avalon Music

- Location within Minnesota Location within the United States
- Location: 301 North Broadway, Rochester, Minnesota
- Coordinates: 44°1′35″N 92°27′48″W
- Built: 1919
- Architect: Ellerbe Architects
- NRHP reference No.: 82002992
- Added to NRHP: March 19, 1982

Avalon Music is a historic three-story red brick building in Rochester, Minnesota. It opened in 1919 as the Northwestern Hotel. The Sam Sternberg family operated it as a kosher restaurant and hotel for Jewish travelers, including many visitors to the nearby Mayo Clinic.

In 1944, Vern Manning bought it and renamed it the Avalon Hotel. As the only hotel in the area which welcomed African Americans before desegregation, its guests included Duke Ellington and boxer Henry Armstrong. It housed the Avalon Café, one of two restaurants in the city which served people of color. It became a local focus of the Civil Rights Movement and opposition to it; both a march for racial equality and a cross burning occurred at the property on August 23, 1963.

After renovation in 1987, the property became Hamilton Music with studios and a store for musical instruments and audio equipment. In 2008, the building changed ownership and became Avalon Music to reflect its history. An expansion project was started in 2018 to turn the building into a restaurant, office space, and apartments.
