= Avalon Hotel =

Hotel in Gothenburg, Sweden

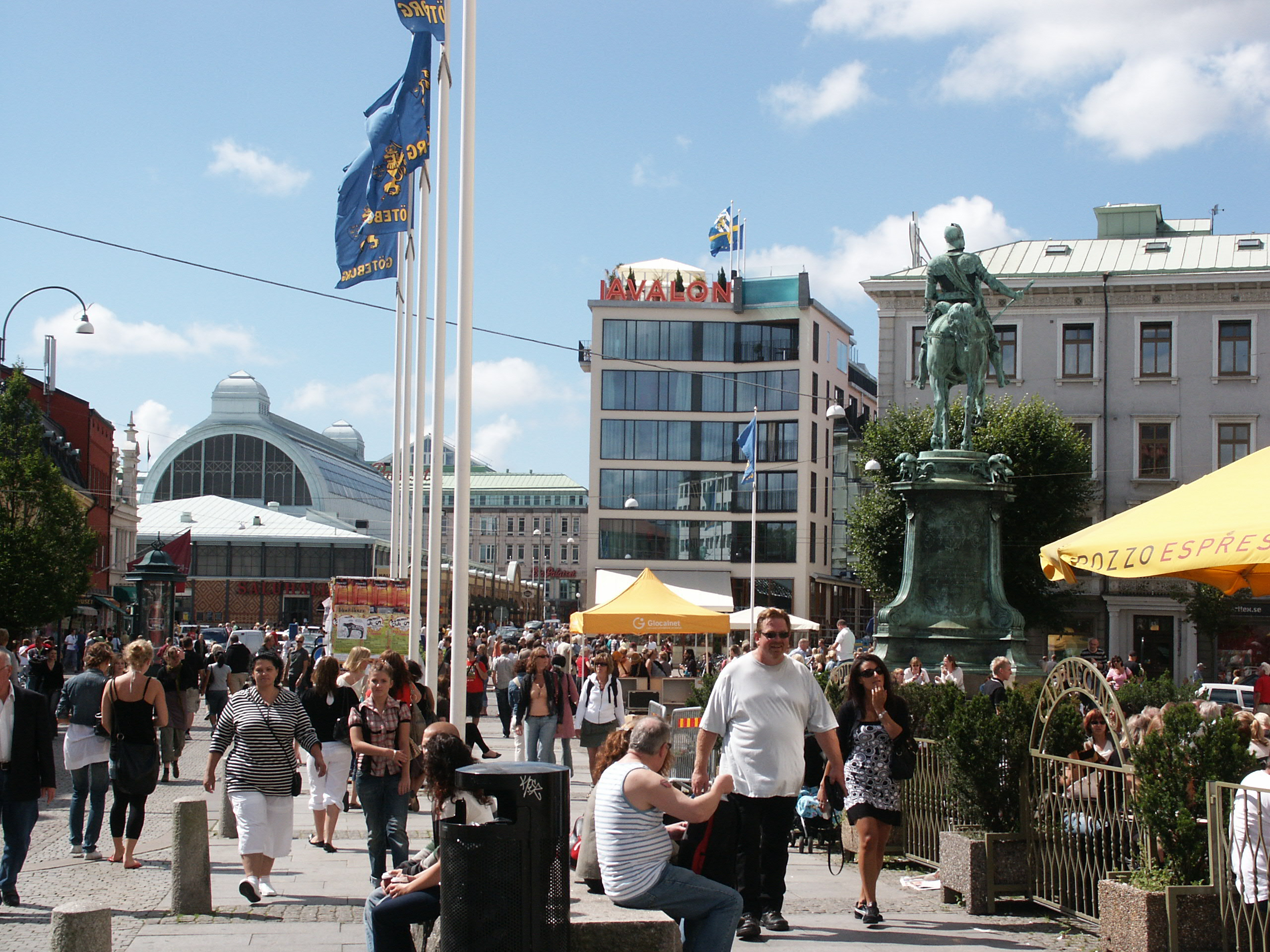
- Avalon Hotel in the background of Kungsportsplatsen
- Interactive map of the Avalon Hotel area

General information
- Location: Gothenburg, Sweden
- Coordinates: 57°42′15″N 11°58′7″E
- Opening: July 2007
- Owner: Svenska Stadshotell AB

Technical details
- Floor count: 6
- Floor area: 5,960 square metres (64,200 sq ft)

Design and construction
- Architects: Semrén & Månsson Arkitektkontor AB

Other information
- Number of rooms: 101
- Number of restaurants: 1

Website
- Avalonhotel.se

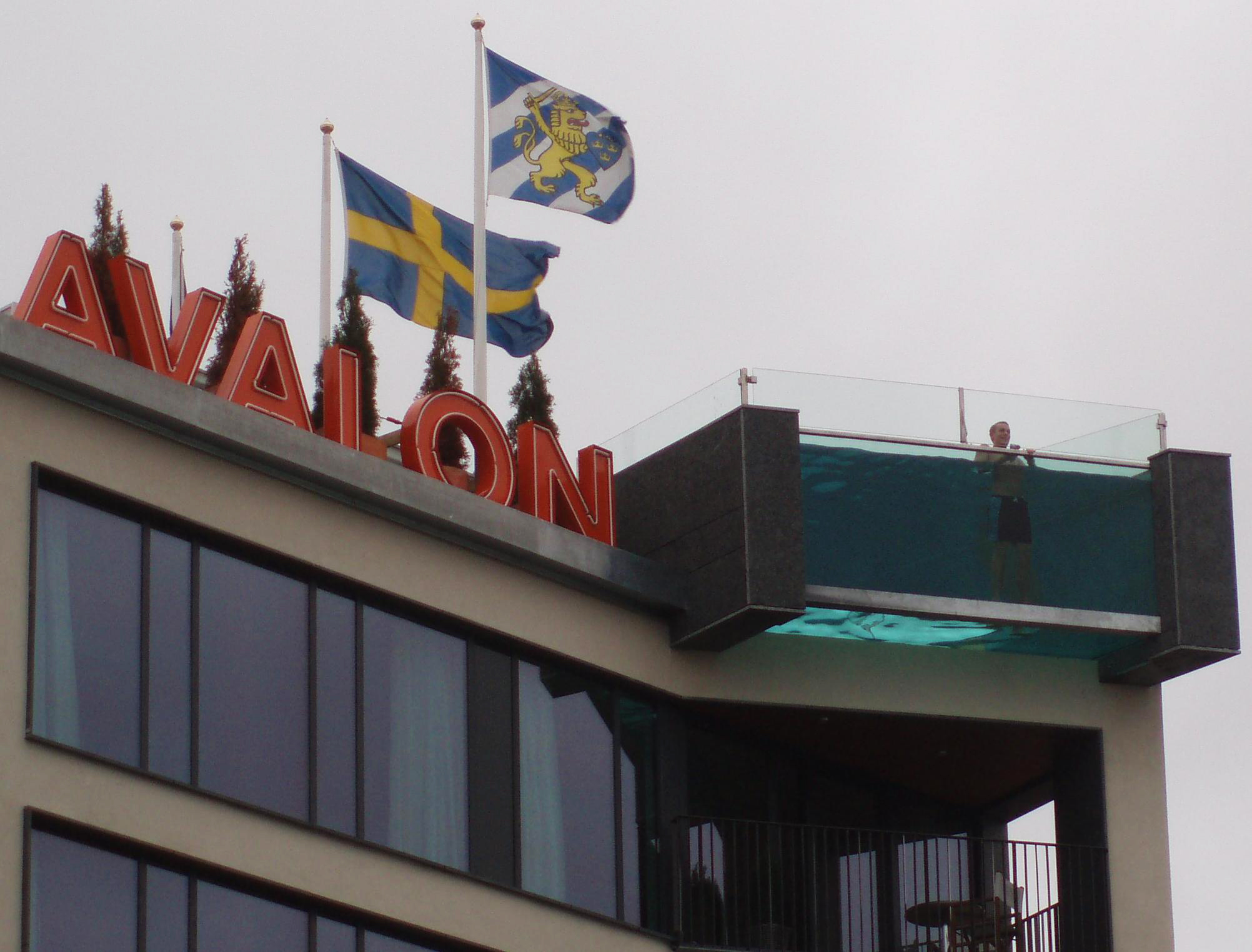
The Swimming pool on the roof of the hotel.

The Avalon Hotel is a hotel in central Gothenburg, Sweden. It is one of the most iconic hotels in Gothenburg and one of Sweden's best hotels, according to several rankings. It is managed by the Norwegian hotel company Strawberry.

== History ==
The site of the hotel at the east end of the Idogheten neighbourhood was built with a four-story stone building in 1879. It features small business locals at ground level and apartments in the above floors. The building was damaged by fire in 1966. Afterward, the building was demolished and replaced by a simple one-story barrack with a shoe shop and a saluhall. The property was acquired by Bygg Göta Göteborg AB in 1978, followed by ongoing discussions regarding constructing a new building since the mid-1980s.

Work with a detailed plan started in the autumn of 2001 and was finished when the plan was accepted in 2005. The plan specified the form of the new building and that it should, in a harmonic way, fit in the environment, but at the same time be representative for its time. The construction permit for the building was approved on 10 January 2006.

== Structure and facilities ==
The hotel has 101 rooms divided in six different categories; Penthouse suite (1), Suite (2), Deluxe (14+8), Superior (30), Business (40), and Moderate (6). Twenty-four of the rooms have miniature spas and three of the rooms have a miniature gym.

=== Rooftop ===
Avalon Hotel is known for its rooftop terrace with a bar and restaurant as well as open air pool on the 7th floor. The pool offers views of central Gothenburg.
