= Robyn Regehr =

Canadian ice hockey player (born 1980)

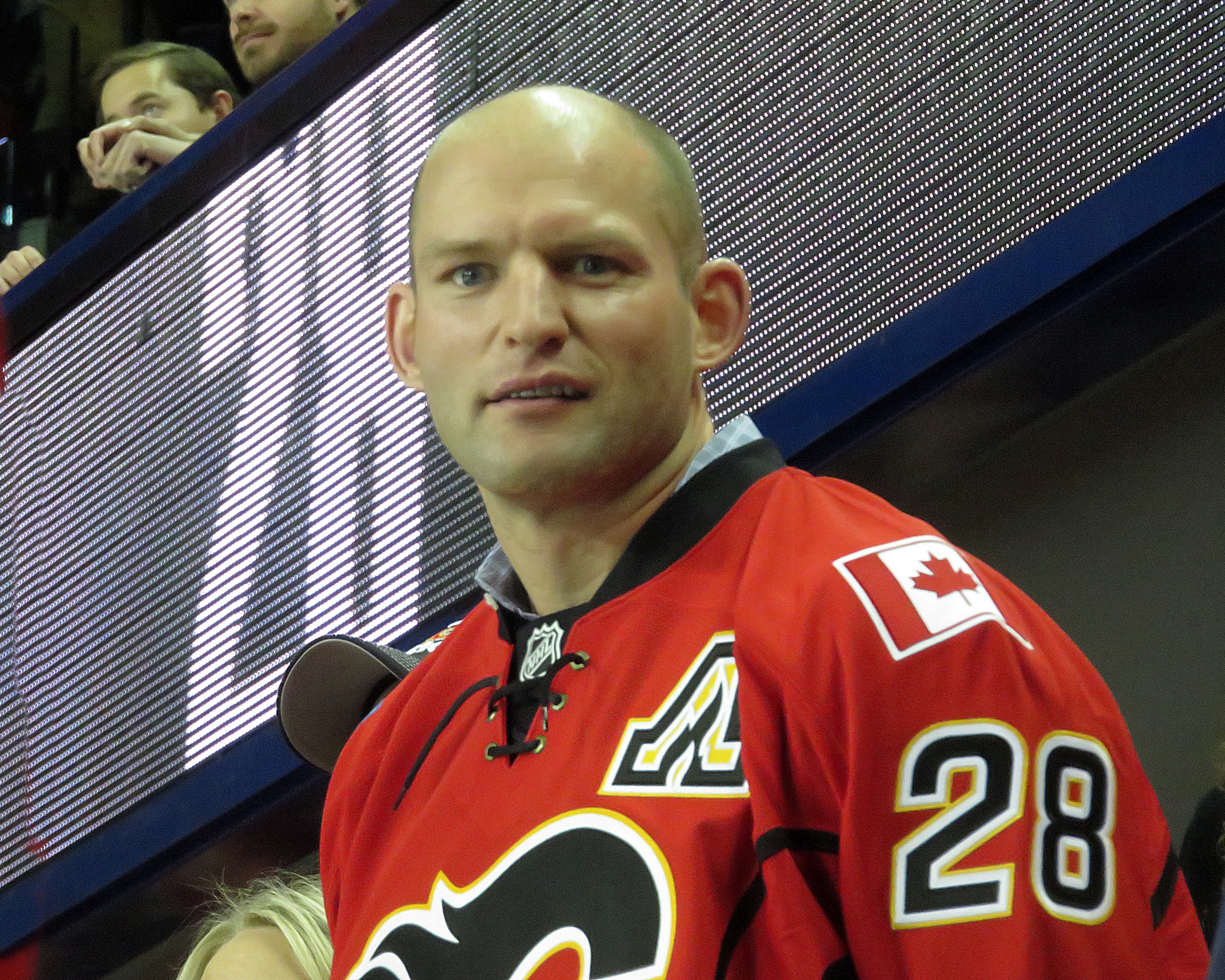
- Regehr in 2016
- Born: April 19, 1980 (age 46) Recife, Brazil
- Height: 6 ft 3 in (191 cm)
- Weight: 225 lb (102 kg; 16 st 1 lb)
- Position: Defence
- Shot: Left
- Played for: Calgary Flames; Buffalo Sabres; Los Angeles Kings
- National team: Canada
- NHL draft: 19th overall, 1998; Colorado Avalanche
- Playing career: 1999–2015

Robyn Regehr (born April 19, 1980) is a Brazilian-Canadian former professional ice hockey player. A defenceman, he was a first-round draft pick of the Colorado Avalanche, selected 19th overall at the 1998 NHL entry draft, but was traded to the Calgary Flames prior to the start of his professional career, and has also played for the Buffalo Sabres and Los Angeles Kings in an NHL career that has spanned 1,089 games. Regehr won his first Stanley Cup in 2014 with the Kings, his 15th year in the NHL. He was a member of the Canadian team at the 2006 Winter Olympics, and has won silver medals at the World Junior and Senior championships, as well as the championship at the 2004 World Cup of Hockey.

Regehr was born in Brazil and spent his early childhood in Indonesia before his parents settled back in Canada. At 19, he was the youngest nominee for the Bill Masterton Memorial Trophy in NHL history after he made his debut less than four months after suffering two broken legs in a serious automobile accident. He is best known for his strong defence and physical ability. His younger brother Richie briefly played with him on the Flames. Regehr announced his retirement from the NHL on April 11, 2015.

== Early life ==
Regehr was born in Recife, Brazil, the second son of Canadian Mennonite missionaries Ron and Edith Regehr. Regehr only lived in Brazil for the first nine months of his life. From three to seven years old he lived in Indonesia, where his younger brother, Richie was born. He also has an older brother and a sister. The family finally settled back in Canada, at Rosthern, Saskatchewan, around the time he turned seven. Regehr quickly picked up the game of hockey, but was held back in his first year of minor hockey as he was starting the game three years behind other kids his age. He helped his father operate the natural surface ice rink in Rosthern, often spending hours manually preparing the ice.

Despite being born in Brazil, Regehr cannot speak Portuguese and has very few connections with the country. He declared himself a fan of football and the Brazilian soccer team, and has expressed interest in returning to visit his country of birth.

== Playing career ==
=== Junior ===
The Kamloops Blazers of the Western Hockey League (WHL) selected Regehr with their first pick, 17th overall, in the 1995 WHL Bantam Draft. He played as a 15-year-old with the Prince Albert Mintos of the Saskatchewan Midget AAA Hockey League where he was named the team's top defenceman. He then joined the Blazers for the 1996–97 WHL season. Two years later, the Colorado Avalanche drafted him in the first round, 19th overall, at the 1998 NHL entry draft. Regehr broke out following the draft, scoring 12 goals and 32 points in 1998–99, and helped the Blazers reach the WHL championship where they lost to the Calgary Hitmen. He was named a Western Conference All-Star by the WHL and a third-team All-Star by the Canadian Hockey League, and represented Canada at the 1999 World Junior Ice Hockey Championships, winning a silver medal.

Late in that season, the Calgary Flames dealt all-star forward Theoren Fleury, along with Chris Dingman, to the Avalanche for Rene Corbet, Wade Belak, a draft pick and their choice of a prospect from a list provided by Colorado. Impressed with his defensive potential, the Flames later chose Regehr to complete that trade. His professional career nearly ended before it started, as he was seriously injured in an automobile accident near Saskatoon, Saskatchewan on July 4, 1999. Regehr, who was driving home from a summer trip with his elder brother Dinho (Ronald) and two female friends, was struck head-on by another vehicle that crossed into his path. He suffered two broken legs in the crash that killed two people in the other vehicle. Doctors initially feared that he would never play hockey again.

=== National Hockey League ===
==== Calgary Flames ====
Following operations to repair the damage to Regehr's legs, doctors gained optimism, but expected he would be unable to skate before the end of the year. He far exceeded doctors' expectations; he was skating by the beginning of September and was back playing hockey less than four months following the accident. He played a five-game conditioning stint with the Saint John Flames of the American Hockey League in late October before being recalled by the Flames on October 28, 1999. That night, he made his NHL debut against the Ottawa Senators and was praised by his coach, Brian Sutter, for playing a mistake free game. He scored his first NHL goal on November 10 against the San Jose Sharks. Regehr played 57 games for the Flames in 1999–2000, scoring five goals and 12 points. He was the Flames nominee for the Bill Masterton Memorial Trophy, which recognizes perseverance, sportsmanship and dedication to hockey. At the age of 19, he was the youngest nominee in NHL history. The Flames also presented him with the Ralph T. Scurfield Humanitarian Award in honor of his perseverance.

Regehr struggled in 2001–02, finishing with a team worst −24 plus/minus while occasionally being left out of the lineup as a healthy scratch. Unhappy with his season, he focused on improving his game. He overcame rib, abdominal and wrist injuries in 2002–03 to establish himself as a top defender with the team and earned a second Masterton Trophy nomination for his dedication. The Flames rewarded him with a five-year contract extension prior to the 2003–04 season. They also named him an alternate captain, a position he continuously held for the remainder of his stay in Calgary.

Not known for his offensive ability, Regehr ended a 100-game goal scoring drought early in the season, finishing with four for the season. He set a career high with 18 points, and was a key player in the Flames improbable run to the 2004 Stanley Cup Final facing top opposition players. He played the final two games of the Stanley Cup Final despite tearing ligaments in his foot in game five. His performance in the post season earned him the praise of his opponents.

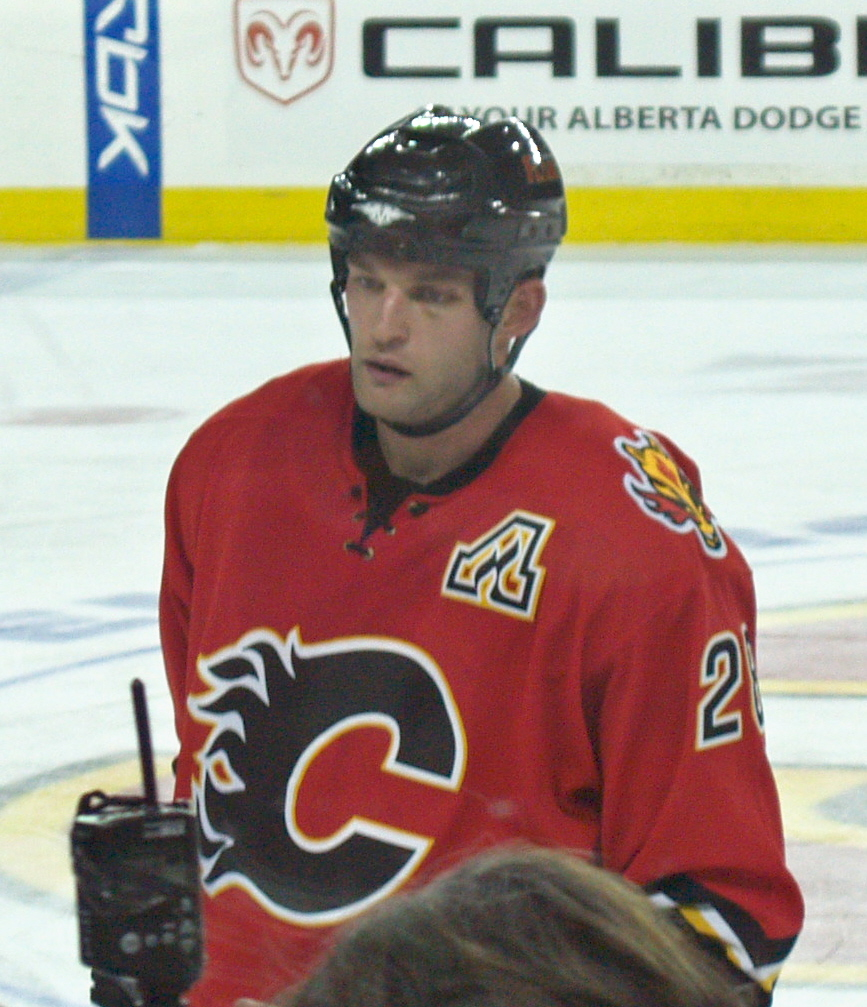
With the Flames in November 2006

While the 2004–05 season was cancelled due to a labor dispute, Regehr played in a European charity tour that saw NHL players form a "Worldstars" team that played ten games in seven countries in December 2004. While he enjoyed the tour, Regehr stated that he was not interested in joining the many other NHL players who signed on with European teams during the lockout. He was also critical of the position of the league in the lockout, and took on a greater role within the National Hockey League Players' Association (NHLPA) when he succeeded Jarome Iginla as the Flames player representative following the lockout.

While the NHL returned to action in 2005–06, he missed the first month of the season after suffering a knee injury in a pre-season game. Doctors considered Regehr fortunate, believing that a knee brace he had been wearing prevented a more severe injury that would have seen him miss up to six months. Despite missing 14 games, he set career highs in goals (6), assists (20) and points (26). He continued to quietly lead the Flames defence and earned a spot on the Canadian Olympic team in 2006. Regehr briefly played with his brother, Richie, who made his NHL debut with the Flames on December 29, 2005. He played the full season in 2006–07, including his 500th career game on March 15, 2007, against the Dallas Stars and scored his 100th career point on March 31 against the Vancouver Canucks. However, he was again forced out of the lineup due to a knee injury after only one game in the 2007 Stanley Cup Playoffs.

Following the season, the Flames signed Regehr to another five-year contract extension worth a total of US$20-million. The deal was considered to be worth less than he could have gotten as an unrestricted free agent the following year, but he chose to take less to stay in a city his family enjoyed and on a team he felt was competitive. Regehr played all 82 games for the Flames in 2007–08 despite being hit in the face by the puck in a game, and suffering a deep bruise on his foot while blocking a shot that was initially feared to be a broken bone.

Off the ice, Regehr was named to an NHLPA committee formed in 2007 to find a replacement for ousted Executive Director Ted Saskin. The union hired Paul Kelly in October 2007, however he was controversially dismissed less than two years later. Regehr defended the firing, though he and all player representatives were criticized for how they handled Kelly's dismissal.

Another knee injury ended his 2008–09 season after 75 games and left him unavailable for the playoffs. He expressed his frustrations with coach Mike Keenan, who was fired by the team after failing to advance past the first round of the playoffs, criticizing Keenan's lack of structure and expressing optimism for the team's chances under a new coach. After failing to score a goal in 2008–09 and the first half of the 2009–10 season, Regehr scored his first goal in 141 games on January 18, 2010, against the San Jose Sharks. He finished with 2 goals and 17 points that season and matched those totals in 2010–11. Upon playing his 804th game late in the season, Regehr surpassed Al MacInnis as the team's all-time leader in games played by a defenceman.

==== Buffalo and Los Angeles ====
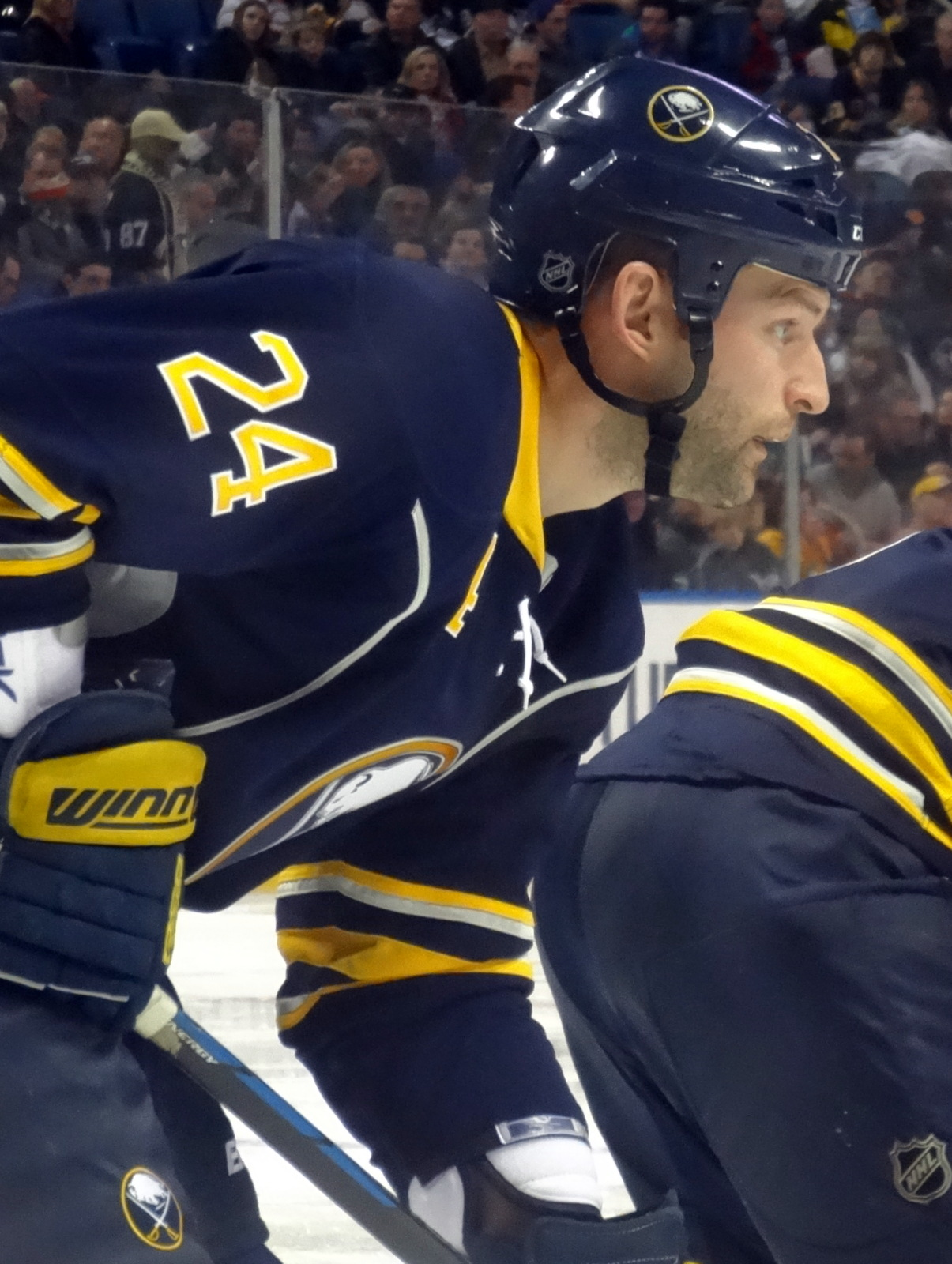
with the Sabres in 2013

After missing the playoffs in the two previous seasons and needing to clear salary cap space to sign Alex Tanguay, the Flames dealt Regehr to the Buffalo Sabres on June 25, 2011. He was sent to Buffalo, along with Aleš Kotalík and a second round selection at the 2012 NHL entry draft in exchange for Paul Byron and Chris Butler. According to Flames' general manager Jay Feaster, the deal "surprised" Regehr, who initially was unsure he would waive his no-trade clause and agree to the deal. Regehr accepted the deal after speaking with Sabres' management.

In his first season with Buffalo, 2011–12, Regehr led the Sabres with 172 hits and finished second with 112 blocked shots. His one-goal on the season ended another lengthy scoring drought that lasted nearly 11 months. His tenure with the Sabres ended 21 games into the 2012–13 season. In the final year of his contract and with Buffalo out of playoff contention, he was dealt to the Los Angeles Kings on April 1, 2013, in exchange for two second round draft picks. The Kings acquired Regehr to add a veteran presence and aid the team's penalty kill. He appeared in 41 games during the season, split between the two teams, and recorded four assists. Shortly after the Kings reached the third round of the 2013 Stanley Cup Playoffs, Regehr and the team agreed to a two-year, $6 million contract extension. After the Kings were eliminated from the post-season by the Chicago Blackhawks, Kings' coach Darryl Sutter revealed he had played the entire playoffs with an elbow injury that required off-season surgery to repair.

In the 2013–14 season, Regehr begun his 15th year in the NHL, and played his 1,000th game on February 1, 2014, against the Philadelphia Flyers. At the 2014 Stanley Cup Playoffs, Regher only played the first round against the San Jose Sharks and game 1 of the second round against the Anaheim Ducks before being sidelined with a knee injury. Once the Kings won the 2014 Stanley Cup Final, captain Dustin Brown finished his victory lap by handing the Stanley Cup to Regehr, thanking the veteran for his off-ice presence.

Following the last regular season game for the Kings and the last day of the 2014–15 regular season, Regehr announced that he would retire from professional hockey.

== International play ==
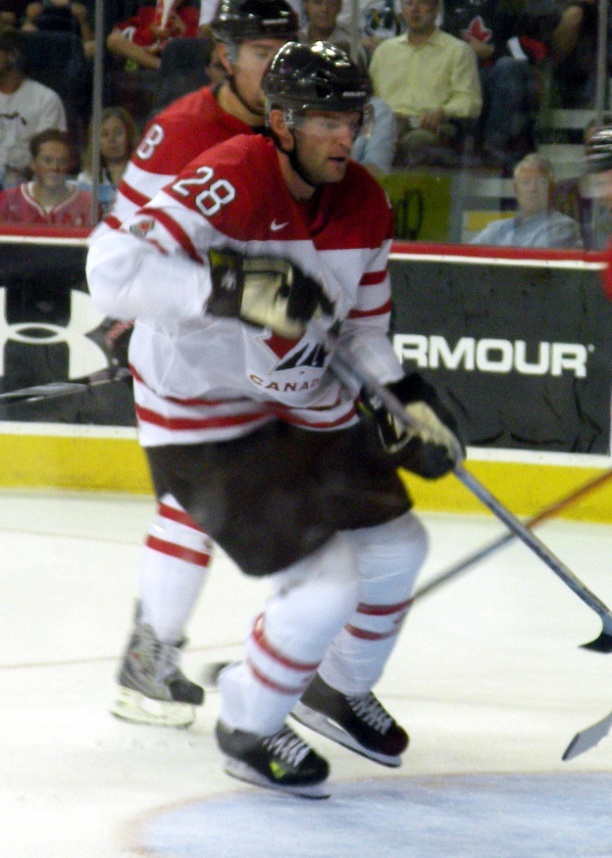

Medal record

Representing Canada

Men's ice hockey

World Championship
Silver medal – second place	2005 Austria	

World Cup
Gold medal – first place	2004 World Cup of Hockey	

World Junior Championship
Silver medal – second place	1999 Canada	

Regehr joined the Canadian junior team for the 1999 World Junior Ice Hockey Championships, playing all seven games for the silver medal winning Canadians. He made his first appearance with the senior team following his rookie season in the NHL, playing six games in the 2000 Men's World Ice Hockey Championships. His emergence in the 2004 Stanley Cup playoffs earned him consideration for Canada's entry at the 2004 World Cup of Hockey. He was named to the team by executive director Wayne Gretzky as he looked to bring a younger team to this tournament than played at the 2002 Winter Olympics. The decision worked, as Regehr and the Canadians won the championship.

He played in his second world championship in 2005, where he won a silver medal after Canada lost the final to the Czech Republic 3–0. The following year, he was named to the Canadian Olympic team for the 2006 Winter Olympics. He recorded one assist in six games, though Canada was unable to defend its 2002 gold medal, failing to medal entirely. Regehr participated in team Canada's orientation camp for the 2010 Games in the hopes of earning a second opportunity to win an Olympic medal.

== Personal life ==
Regehr married his wife Kristina in late 2007, and the couple have two sons. While in Calgary, they were active in the community, serving as honorary co-chairs of the Impact Foundation, an organization that aims to help kids deal with the challenges of growing up. Regehr donated $75 to the organization for every bodycheck he was credited with during the NHL season. He is also active with Right to Play, an athlete driven organization that aims to improve the lives of the world's most impoverished children through sport. He made a trip to Mozambique in the summer of 2008 as an ambassador to the organization, and has participated in charity events for the organization. The Flames named him the inaugural recipient of the J. R. "Bud" McCaig Award in 2006 in honor of his contributions to society. He is an avid outdoorsman; his favorite winter activity is snowmobiling. He favours wakeboarding in the summer, and has spent time teaching kids outdoor safety.

== Career statistics ==
=== Regular season and playoffs ===
			Regular season					Playoffs
Season	Team	League	GP	G	A	Pts	PIM	GP	G	A	Pts	PIM
1996–97	Kamloops Blazers	WHL	64	4	19	23	96	5	0	1	1	18
1997–98	Kamloops Blazers	WHL	65	4	10	14	120	5	0	3	3	8
1998–99	Kamloops Blazers	WHL	54	12	20	32	130	12	1	4	5	21
1999–00	Calgary Flames	NHL	57	5	7	12	46	—	—	—	—	—
1999–00	Saint John Flames	AHL	5	0	0	0	0	—	—	—	—	—
2000–01	Calgary Flames	NHL	71	1	3	4	70	—	—	—	—	—
2001–02	Calgary Flames	NHL	78	2	6	8	93	—	—	—	—	—
2002–03	Calgary Flames	NHL	76	0	12	12	87	—	—	—	—	—
2003–04	Calgary Flames	NHL	82	4	14	18	74	26	2	7	9	20
2005–06	Calgary Flames	NHL	68	6	20	26	67	7	1	3	4	6
2006–07	Calgary Flames	NHL	78	2	19	21	75	1	0	0	0	0
2007–08	Calgary Flames	NHL	82	5	15	20	79	7	0	2	2	2
2008–09	Calgary Flames	NHL	75	0	8	8	73	—	—	—	—	—
2009–10	Calgary Flames	NHL	81	2	15	17	80	—	—	—	—	—
2010–11	Calgary Flames	NHL	79	2	15	17	58	—	—	—	—	—
2011–12	Buffalo Sabres	NHL	76	1	4	5	56	—	—	—	—	—
2012–13	Buffalo Sabres	NHL	29	0	2	2	21	—	—	—	—	—
2012–13	Los Angeles Kings	NHL	12	0	2	2	2	18	0	1	1	6
2013–14	Los Angeles Kings	NHL	79	3	11	14	46	8	0	2	2	7
2014–15	Los Angeles Kings	NHL	67	3	10	13	45	—	—	—	—	—
NHL totals			1,089	36	163	199	972	66	3	15	18	41

=== International ===
Year	Team	Event	GP	G	A	Pts	PIM
1999	Canada	WJC	7	0	0	0	2
2000	Canada	WC	6	0	0	0	2
2004	Canada	WCH	6	0	0	0	6
2005	Canada	WC	9	0	0	0	4
2006	Canada	OLY	6	0	1	1	2
Junior totals			7	0	0	0	2
Senior totals			27	0	1	1	16

== Awards and honours ==
Award	Year
Junior
WHL Western Conference First All-Star Team	1998–99
CHL Third Team All-Star	1998–99
Calgary Flames team awards
Ralph T. Scurfield Humanitarian Award	1999–2000
J. R. "Bud" McCaig Award	2005–06
NHL
Stanley Cup champion	2014

== See also ==
- List of family relations in the NHL

Awards and achievements
Preceded by Martin Škoula	Colorado Avalanche first-round draft pick 1998	Succeeded by Scott Parker
