= Shawn Horcoff =

Canadian ice hockey player (born 1978)

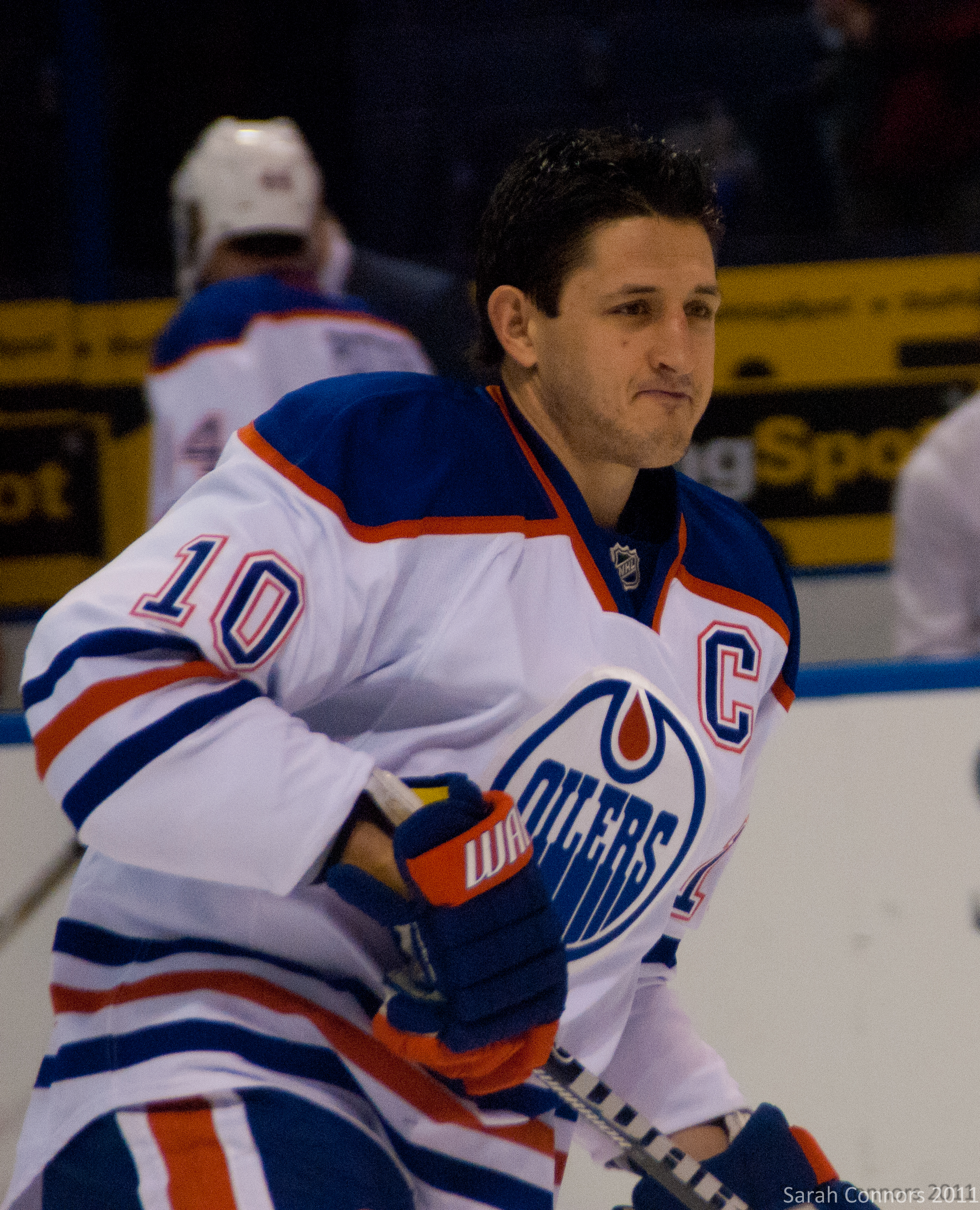
- Horcoff with the Edmonton Oilers in 2012
- Born: September 17, 1978 (age 48) Trail, British Columbia, Canada
- Height: 6 ft 1 in (185 cm)
- Weight: 210 lb (95 kg; 15 st 0 lb)
- Position: Centre
- Shot: Left
- Played for: Edmonton Oilers; Mora IK; Dallas Stars; Anaheim Ducks
- National team: Canada
- NHL draft: 99th overall, 1998; Edmonton Oilers
- Playing career: 2000–2016
Medal record
Representing Canada
World Championships
| Gold medal – first place | 2003 Helsinki |
| Gold medal – first place | 2004 Prague |
| Silver medal – second place | 2009 Bern |

Shawn Paul Horcoff (born September 17, 1978) is a Canadian former professional ice hockey centre and current interim general manager of the Detroit Red Wings of the National Hockey League (NHL). He was selected in the fourth round of the 1998 NHL entry draft, 99th overall, by the Edmonton Oilers, with whom he played 12 seasons and served as team captain for three seasons. In his later career as a player, he also had brief tenures with the Dallas Stars and Anaheim Ducks.

Horcoff pursued a career in management following his retirement as a player. Horcoff joined the Red Wings organization in 2016, and was later named general manager of the American Hockey League (AHL) Grand Rapids Griffins in 2022, before being promoted to interim general manager of the Red Wings in 2026.

== Playing career ==
=== Amateur ===
Horcoff played his first college season with Michigan State University, in the Central Collegiate Hockey Association (CCHA), in 1996. After a respectable first season in which he was considered a contender for the CCHA All-Rookie Team, Horcoff improved his numbers as a sophomore in 1997–98, despite playing in fewer games than the year before. This led to him being drafted by the Edmonton Oilers in the 1998 NHL entry draft. The following season, 1998–99, Horcoff again improved his totals with the Spartans and was named to the CCHA All-Academic Team at season's end.

The 1999–00 season was Horcoff's final year with Michigan State, and he posted career-high totals in goals, assists, and points. Along with a second CCHA All-Academic Team spot, Horcoff received some major awards, including CCHA Player of the Year. He was also a finalist for the Hobey Baker Award, given to the top player in college hockey.

While at Michigan State, Horcoff studied finance and mathematics, receiving his degree before beginning his professional hockey career.

=== Edmonton Oilers ===
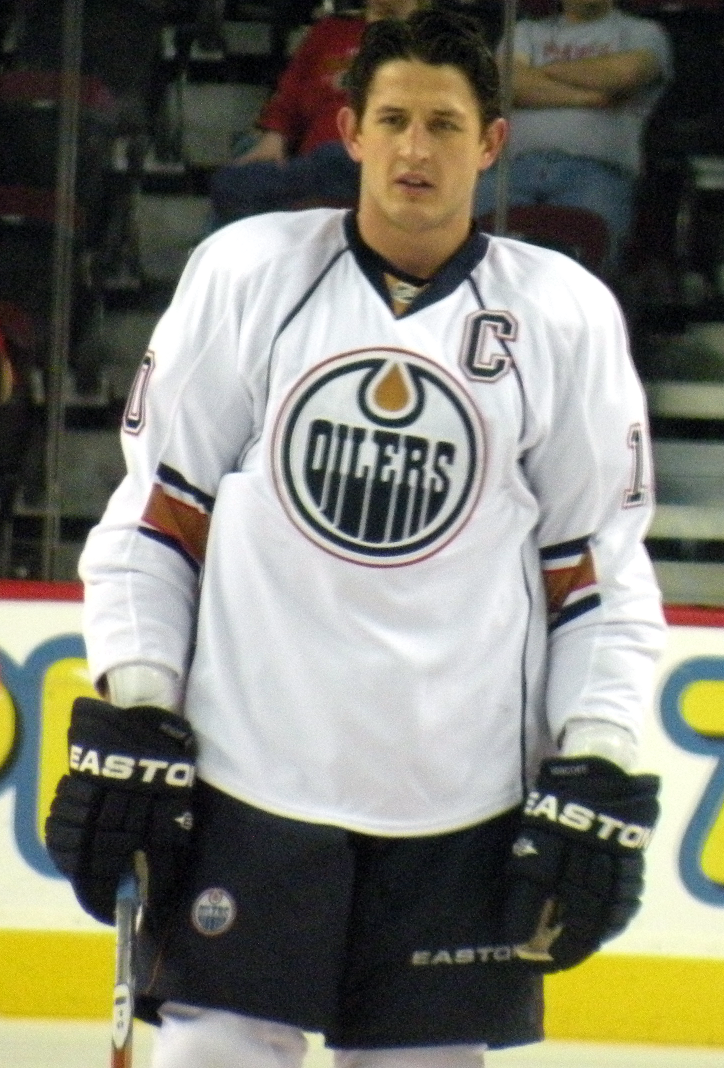
Horcoff with the Oilers in 2010.

After leaving university, Horcoff failed to make the 2000–01 Edmonton Oilers out of training camp, and was assigned to their American Hockey League (AHL) affiliate, the Hamilton Bulldogs. Horcoff excelled in Hamilton, leading the team in scoring and sitting sixth overall in AHL scoring. He was also tied for the lead in AHL rookie scoring (with Toby Petersen) and was named AHL Rookie of the Month for November 2000. On December 4, 2000, the Oilers recalled Horcoff, and on December 13, Horcoff scored his first NHL goal against the Dallas Stars. This call-up prevented Horcoff from appearing in the 2000–01 AHL All-Star Game, where he had been named as a starter for the Canadian All-Star Team. Horcoff played the remainder of the season in the NHL, and played his first five playoff games in April against the Stars.

Horcoff played his 100th NHL game in 2001–02, and spent the majority of the season with the Oilers, only appearing in two games with Hamilton as part of a conditioning stint. The next season, Horcoff played the entire year with Edmonton, appearing in the 2003 NHL YoungStars Game. In the 2003 Stanley Cup playoffs, Horcoff led the Oilers in goals. In 2003–04, Horcoff set career highs in goals, assists, and points, and was named the Oilers' Outstanding Defensive Forward.

During the NHL lockout, Horcoff sought out a team where he would be able to play more of an offensive role, and signed a contract with for Mora IK of the Swedish Elitserien. This season marked a turning point in his career, where he played the role of an offensive leader (finishing fourth in the league in scoring) with a professional team. He has also represented Canada at the Ice Hockey World Championships. After the lockout, Horcoff returned to the NHL in 2005–06 and experienced an offensive breakthrough, posting career highs in goals, assists, and points, and for the first time in his career took on the role of number one centre. He also tied Wayne Gretzky's team record for most points in a period when he assisted on four third period goals against the Detroit Red Wings on November 18, 2005.

On January 10, 2006, Horcoff scored his first career NHL hat-trick, scoring all Oiler goals in a 3–1 win over the Pittsburgh Penguins.

Horcoff was part of the Edmonton Oilers team that made a run to the 2006 Stanley Cup Finals. However, the Oilers lost in Game 7 of the Finals to the Carolina Hurricanes. Horcoff had seven goals and 12 assists in the 2006 playoffs.

In July 2006, Horcoff re-signed with the Oilers on a three-year contract. Horcoff used the off-season to make some changes after a disappointing 2006–07 season. In addition to a demanding conditioning regimen, Horcoff went to the Easton Hockey factory in Tijuana, Mexico, and had a stick custom designed for him. In the summer of 2007, with the National Hockey League Players' Association (NHLPA) looking for a replacement for ousted leader Ted Saskin, Horcoff was one of five players named to the search committee that eventually selected Paul Kelly.

In 2008, Horcoff was elected to the 56th NHL All-Star Game, held in Atlanta, where he won Fastest Skater in the Skills Competition.

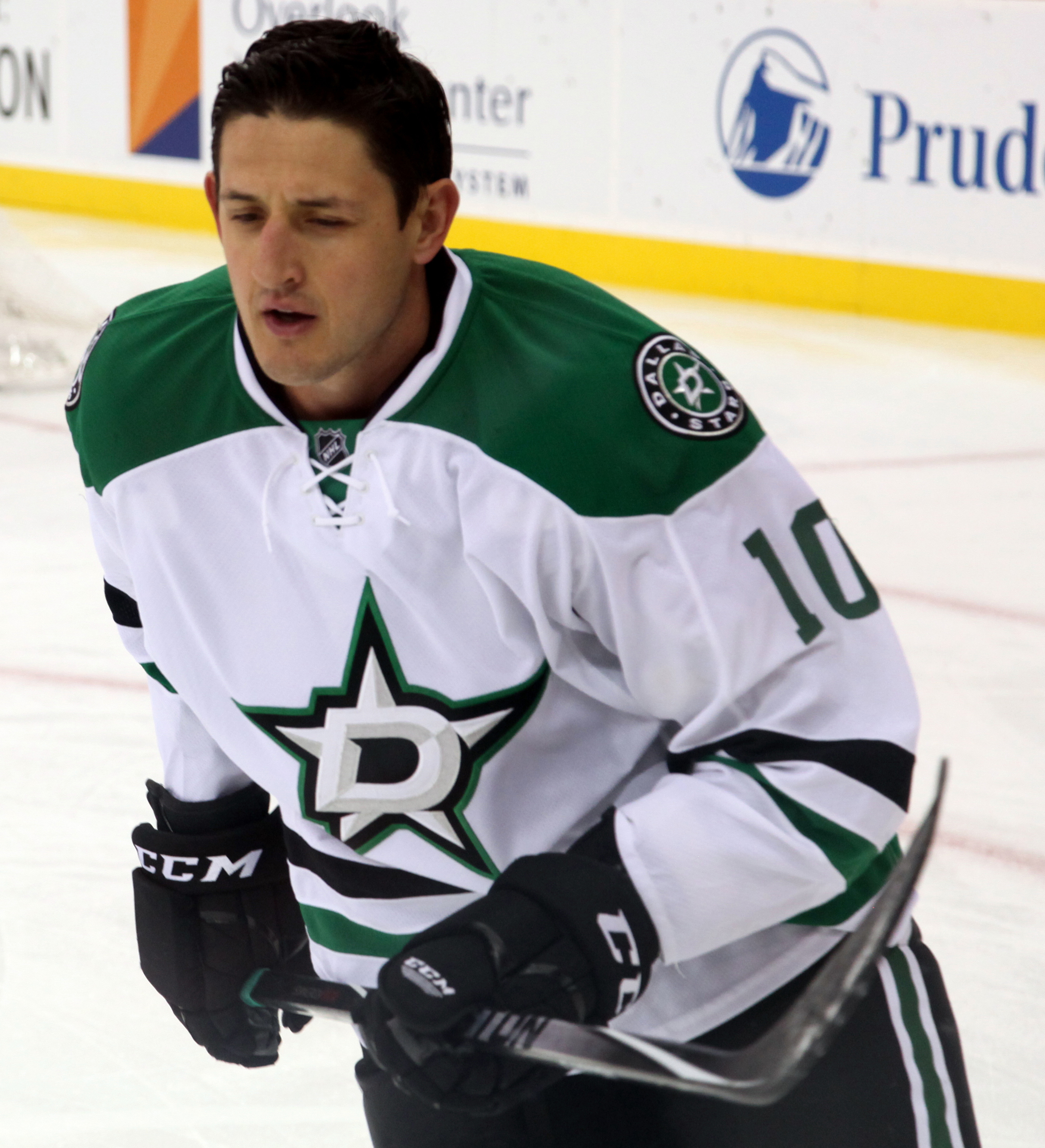
Horcoff in October 2014 during his tenure with the Stars.

In February 2008, Horcoff underwent shoulder surgery, ending his 2007–08 season. On July 16, 2008, the Oilers announced that Horcoff had been signed to a six-year, $33-million contract extension. He would see action in 80 games during the 2008–09 season, scoring 17 goals and 36 assists.

On October 6, 2010, Horcoff was named the 13th captain in Edmonton Oilers' history, succeeding Ethan Moreau, who had departed the team for the Columbus Blue Jackets in the previous off-season.

On March 3, 2011, Horcoff recorded his 400th career point, tallying two assists in a 4–2 victory over the Columbus Blue Jackets.

Despite recording 20 points in the first 27 games of the 2011–12 season, Horcoff only scored 14 points in his last 54 games, capping off a disappointing end to a disappointing season.

=== Dallas Stars ===
After completion of the lockout-shortened 2012–13 season, on July 4, 2013, Horcoff was traded by the Oilers to the Dallas Stars in exchange for defenceman Philip Larsen and a seventh-round draft pick in 2016.

=== Anaheim Ducks ===
After two seasons with the Stars, as a free agent on July 1, 2015, Horcoff signed a one-year contract with the Anaheim Ducks. On January 26, 2016, Horcoff was suspended 20 games by the NHL for violating the league's performance-enhancing substance program.

== Post-retirement ==
On September 16, 2016, Horcoff was named director of player development for the Detroit Red Wings. In 2022, he was named the assistant general manager of the Red Wings and the general manager of the American Hockey League affiliate, the Grand Rapids Griffins.

On September 15, 2026, Horcoff was named interim general manager of the Red Wings, succeeding Steve Yzerman.

== International play ==
Horcoff has represented Canada three times internationally, winning gold in 2003 and 2004 and silver in 2009 at the World Championships.

== Personal life ==
Horcoff and former Major League Baseball (MLB) outfielder Jason Bay are friends, having grown up near each other in British Columbia.

Shawn Horcoff has been married to his wife Cindy, of Northville, Michigan and together the couple have three children. Although born in Trail, British Columbia, he grew up and went to school in Castlegar, British Columbia. His son, Will, is a college ice hockey player at Michigan and was drafted by the Pittsburgh Penguins in the 2025 NHL entry draft.

== Career statistics ==
=== Regular season and playoffs ===
| | | | Regular season | | | | | Playoffs |
| Season | Team | League | GP | G | A | Pts | PIM | GP | G | A | Pts | PIM |
|---|---|---|---|---|---|---|---|---|---|---|---|---|
| 1994–95 | Trail Smoke Eaters | RMJHL | 47 | 50 | 46 | 96 | 26 | — | — | — | — | — |
| 1995–96 | Chilliwack Chiefs | BCHL | 58 | 49 | 96 | 145 | 44 | 9 | 5 | 19 | 24 | 12 |
| 1996–97 | Michigan State University | CCHA | 40 | 10 | 13 | 23 | 20 | — | — | — | — | — |
| 1997–98 | Michigan State University | CCHA | 34 | 14 | 13 | 27 | 50 | — | — | — | — | — |
| 1998–99 | Michigan State University | CCHA | 39 | 12 | 25 | 37 | 70 | — | — | — | — | — |
| 1999–2000 | Michigan State University | CCHA | 42 | 14 | 51 | 65 | 50 | — | — | — | — | — |
| 2000–01 | Hamilton Bulldogs | AHL | 24 | 10 | 18 | 28 | 19 | — | — | — | — | — |
| 2000–01 | Edmonton Oilers | NHL | 49 | 9 | 7 | 16 | 10 | 5 | 0 | 0 | 0 | 0 |
| 2001–02 | Hamilton Bulldogs | AHL | 2 | 1 | 2 | 3 | 6 | — | — | — | — | — |
| 2001–02 | Edmonton Oilers | NHL | 61 | 8 | 14 | 22 | 18 | — | — | — | — | — |
| 2002–03 | Edmonton Oilers | NHL | 78 | 12 | 21 | 33 | 55 | 6 | 3 | 1 | 4 | 6 |
| 2003–04 | Edmonton Oilers | NHL | 80 | 15 | 25 | 40 | 73 | — | — | — | — | — |
| 2004–05 | Mora IK | SEL | 50 | 19 | 27 | 46 | 117 | — | — | — | — | — |
| 2005–06 | Edmonton Oilers | NHL | 79 | 22 | 51 | 73 | 85 | 24 | 7 | 12 | 19 | 12 |
| 2006–07 | Edmonton Oilers | NHL | 80 | 16 | 35 | 51 | 56 | — | — | — | — | — |
| 2007–08 | Edmonton Oilers | NHL | 53 | 21 | 29 | 50 | 30 | — | — | — | — | — |
| 2008–09 | Edmonton Oilers | NHL | 80 | 17 | 36 | 53 | 39 | — | — | — | — | — |
| 2009–10 | Edmonton Oilers | NHL | 77 | 13 | 23 | 36 | 51 | — | — | — | — | — |
| 2010–11 | Edmonton Oilers | NHL | 47 | 9 | 18 | 27 | 46 | — | — | — | — | — |
| 2011–12 | Edmonton Oilers | NHL | 81 | 13 | 21 | 34 | 24 | — | — | — | — | — |
| 2012–13 | Edmonton Oilers | NHL | 31 | 7 | 5 | 12 | 24 | — | — | — | — | — |
| 2013–14 | Dallas Stars | NHL | 77 | 7 | 13 | 20 | 52 | 6 | 1 | 5 | 6 | 5 |
| 2014–15 | Dallas Stars | NHL | 76 | 11 | 18 | 29 | 27 | — | — | — | — | — |
| 2015–16 | Anaheim Ducks | NHL | 59 | 6 | 9 | 15 | 34 | 5 | 0 | 1 | 1 | 2 |
| NHL totals | | | 1,008 | 186 | 325 | 511 | 624 | 46 | 11 | 19 | 30 | 25 |

=== International ===
| Year | Team | Event | Result | GP | G | A | Pts | PIM |
|---|---|---|---|---|---|---|---|---|
| 2003 | Canada | WC | 1st place, gold medalist(s) | 9 | 3 | 4 | 7 | 0 |
| 2004 | Canada | WC | 1st place, gold medalist(s) | 9 | 3 | 4 | 7 | 8 |
| 2009 | Canada | WC | 2nd place, silver medalist(s) | 9 | 1 | 1 | 2 | 6 |
| Senior totals | | | | 27 | 7 | 9 | 16 | 14 |

== Awards and honours ==
| Award | Year |
|---|---|
College
| CCHA All-Academic Team | 1998–99 |
| CCHA All-Academic Team | 1999–00 |
| All-CCHA First Team | 1999–00 |
| All-CCHA Best Defensive Forward | 1999–00 |
| All-CCHA Player of the Year | 1999–00 |
| AHCA West First-Team All-American | 1999–00 |
| CCHA All-Tournament Team | 2000 |
NHL
| All-Star Game | 2008 |

Awards and achievements
| Preceded by Mike York | CCHA Player of the Year; 1999-00 | Succeeded by Ryan Miller |
| Preceded by Mike York | CCHA Best Defensive Forward; 1999-00 | Succeeded by John Nail |
Sporting positions
| Preceded by Ethan Moreau | Edmonton Oilers captain 2010–13 | Succeeded by Andrew Ference |
| Preceded by Steve Yzerman | General manager of the Detroit Red Wings (interim); 2026–present | Incumbent |
