= Mike Gartner =

Canadian ice hockey player (born 1959)

- Hockey Hall of Fame, 2001
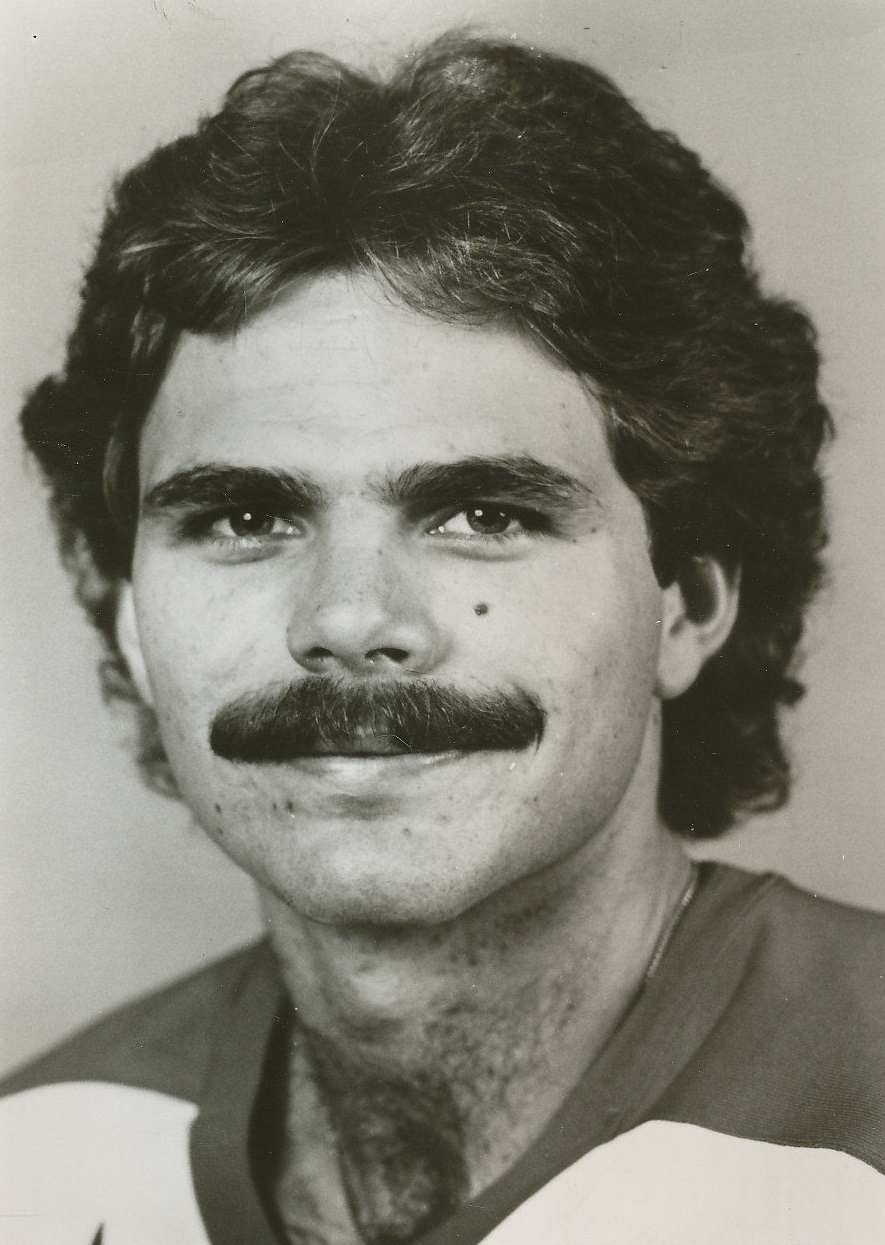
- Gartner with the Washington Capitals in 1981
- Born: 29 October 1959 (age 67) Ottawa, Ontario, Canada
- Height: 6 ft 0 in (183 cm)
- Weight: 190 lb (86 kg; 13 st 8 lb)
- Position: Right wing
- Shot: Right
- Played for: Cincinnati Stingers; Washington Capitals; Minnesota North Stars; New York Rangers; Toronto Maple Leafs; Phoenix Coyotes
- NHL draft: 4th overall, 1979; Washington Capitals
- Playing career: 1978–1998
Medal record
Men's ice hockey
Representing Canada
World Championships
| Bronze medal – third place | 1982 Finland |
| Bronze medal – third place | 1983 West Germany |
Canada Cup
| Gold medal – first place | 1984 Canada |
| Gold medal – first place | 1987 Canada |
IIHF World Junior Championship
| Bronze medal – third place | 1978 Canada |

Michael Alfred Gartner (born 29 October 1959) is a Canadian former professional ice hockey player who was a right winger for 19 seasons in the National Hockey League (NHL) for the Washington Capitals, Minnesota North Stars, New York Rangers, Toronto Maple Leafs and Phoenix Coyotes. He also played one season in the World Hockey Association (WHA) for the Cincinnati Stingers.

Gartner began his career with the WHA in its final year in 1978, where he recorded 27 goals in his only season in the league as a nineteen-year old player. In 1979, he was drafted as the fourth overall pick in the draft by the Capitals. With his blazing speed and shot, Gartner became a dependable player for the then-fledging franchise, recording the first of a record fifteen consecutive 30-goal seasons in 1979; he peaked in goals with 50 in the 1984–85 season. Gartner was traded to Minnesota in the middle of the 1988–89 season; when he departed Washington, he led the franchise in goals and assists. Gartner was traded to New York in the midst of the 1989–90 season and became the sixteenth player to reach 500 goals in 1991. Late in the 1993–94 season, he was traded to Toronto, where he reached the Conference Finals for the only time that year. He concluded his career in Phoenix that saw reach 700 goals, the fifth player to do so. Internationally, Gartner won the Canada Cup twice with Team Canada. While Gartner never won a major award or reached the Stanley Cup Final as a player, he recorded over 700 goals and 600 assists in over 1,400 games, a mark achieved by only five players at the time he retired. He was named to the NHL All-Star Game seven times.

Gartner was inducted into the Hockey Hall of Fame in 2001 in his first year of eligibility and had his number retired by the Capitals in 2008. He became a member of the Hall of Fame Selection Committee in 2009, rising to chair of the committee in 2022. In 2017, Gartner was named one of the 100 Greatest NHL Players in the league's 100-year history. After his 15-year tenure on the committee concluded in 2024, he was named to serve as the new chairman of the board of the Hall in July 2025.

== Early life ==
Gartner was born in Ottawa, Ontario. The family moved to Mississauga, a suburb of Toronto when Gartner was young and moved to Barrie when he was 13 years old. His father Alf, a former amateur goalie, insisted that his son work on power skating training for three summers, which he did before he turned 10 at the Dixie Arena. He played hockey in Mississauga and midget hockey in Barrie, which saw him win a Canadian National Wrigley Midget Championship. As a youth, Gartner played in the 1972 Quebec International Pee-Wee Hockey Tournament with a minor ice hockey team from Toronto.

He participated in an exhibition tour in Moscow at the age of 15. He rose to Tier II and then the Niagara Falls Flyers of the OHA. He won the Emms Family Award for his play as a rookie in the 1976–77 OMJHL season. He recorded 74 combined goals in two seasons and was selected to the 1978 World Junior Championships, finishing third place. Desiring the chance to play in the pro leagues, he decided to sign a contract with the World Hockey Association at the age of 18.

Gartner was born with amblyopia in his right eye, which he played with for his entire hockey career. As stated by Gartner in 2020:

My left eye is my dominant eye, I have 20-20 vision in my left eye and 20/200 vision in my right eye. If I cover my left eye and look out of my right eye, I couldn’t even drive my car. It didn’t really come into play until I turned pro, at which point I had to take an eye test. The doctor said, ‘cover one eye, and then cover the other’ – and I said, ‘I can’t see out of that eye.’ For years, the doctors just kinda looked the other way – I would take the black thing they use to cover your eye and move it a little so I could read the eye charts. They didn’t care if I could see out of both eyes, as long as I could pass the eye test – and score goals.

== Playing career ==
Feeling that he was ready for the pro leagues but without the option to play in the National Hockey League until he was 20, Gartner signed a multi-year contract with the Cincinnati Stingers of the World Hockey Association in 1978. In the 1978–79 WHA season, he played on a line with Mark Messier and finished second to Wayne Gretzky for Rookie of the Year honors while having 27 goals. He was named to the 1979 WHA All-Star Games in January that saw him record two points in the second and third games played against Moscow Dynamo.

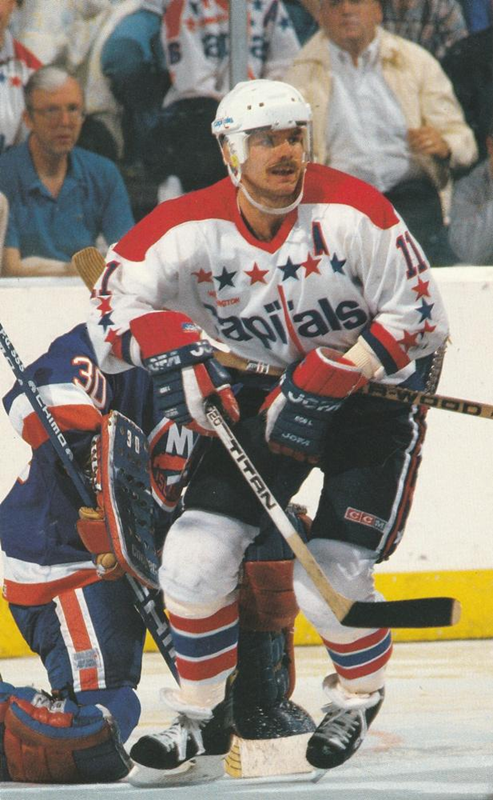
Gartner with the Washington Capitals in 1987

Gartner was drafted in the first round as the fourth overall pick by the Washington Capitals in the 1979 NHL entry draft; he was one of four Hall of Famers selected in the first round of the draft. He would play for them for the better part of ten seasons. He recorded an assist in his NHL debut on 11 October 1979, versus the Buffalo Sabres, and wore number eleven for the team. In the 1979–80 season, Gartner won the Capitals' Rookie of the Year and MVP awards and was voted by their fans as the team's Most Promising Player while leading the team with 36 goals. On 18 October of the 1980–81 season, Gartner had his first four-goal game in his career, doing so against the New York Rangers. Later in the season, he set a franchise record with a point in seventeen straight games, doing so from 26 February to 2 March with seventeen goals and seven assists.

Gartner had his first serious injury in the midst of the 1982–83 season, which saw him play 73 games with 38 goals and assists each. In the 13 February game against the Winnipeg Jets, Gartner was struck in the left eye by a wayward puck. He suffered two fractures in his cheekbone and had damage to his optic nerve. He returned to action in March and wore a protective eye shield for the rest of his career. In the 1984–85 season, Gartner had a banner year. He had a seventeen-game point streak from 13 October to 21 November on the strength of 12 goals and 16 assists to tie his own franchise record, a mark that still stands. Teamed up with Bobby Carpenter by head coach Bryan Murray, each player ended up recording 50 goals, with Gartner recording 52 assists for the Capitals. Gartner became the second Capitals player with 50 goals and 50 assists in the same season when he recorded two goals and assists each in the season finale against Pittsburgh on 7 April. It was the first and only time Gartner had a 50-goal season in his NHL career.

The 1985–86 season saw him miss time near the end of the year due to undergoing arthroscopic surgery to repair torn cartilage in his left knee. He recorded 35 goals in 74 games. He returned two weeks later in time for the playoff run, recording two goals and a career-high ten assists in nine games. In the 1986–87 season, Gartner had a nine-game goal-scoring streak, doing so from 17 January to 1 February 1987 to tie Alan Haworth for the longest goal-scoring streak in franchise history, a mark that still stands. He had his second and last four-goal game as a professional on 20 February against the Vancouver Canucks.

Gartner was traded to the Minnesota North Stars on 7 March 1989, with Larry Murphy for Dino Ciccarelli and Bob Rouse; team general manager David Poile stated that the move for Ciccarelli was one where a "change would be better for the upcoming stretch drive and playoffs", stating the general similarities between him and Gartner with the potential upside in power play opportunities with Ciccarelli. He left the Capitals as the team's all-time leader in career goals, assists and points.

Gartner only lasted one season with Minnesota and was traded to the New York Rangers (who were looking for more speed and scoring) on 6 March 1990 for Ulf Dahlén, a draft pick, and future considerations. He scored two goals in his debut with the Rangers versus the Philadelphia Flyers. He scored eleven goals and sixteen points in the remaining twelve regular-season games the Rangers played that year. In 1991–92, he became the first player in NHL history to score his 500th goal, 500th assist, 1000th point and play in his 1000th game all in the same season. On 14 October 1991, he recorded his 500th career goal, becoming the first player to reach the milestone as a Ranger. The next season, Gartner became the first Ranger to score at least 40 goals in three consecutive seasons. He also scored four goals in the NHL All-Star Game and earned the All-Star Game MVP award. In 84 games, he had 45 goals with 23 assists. It was his 14th 30-goal season for his career, which tied him with Marcel Dionne and Gordie Howe for the most in that category.

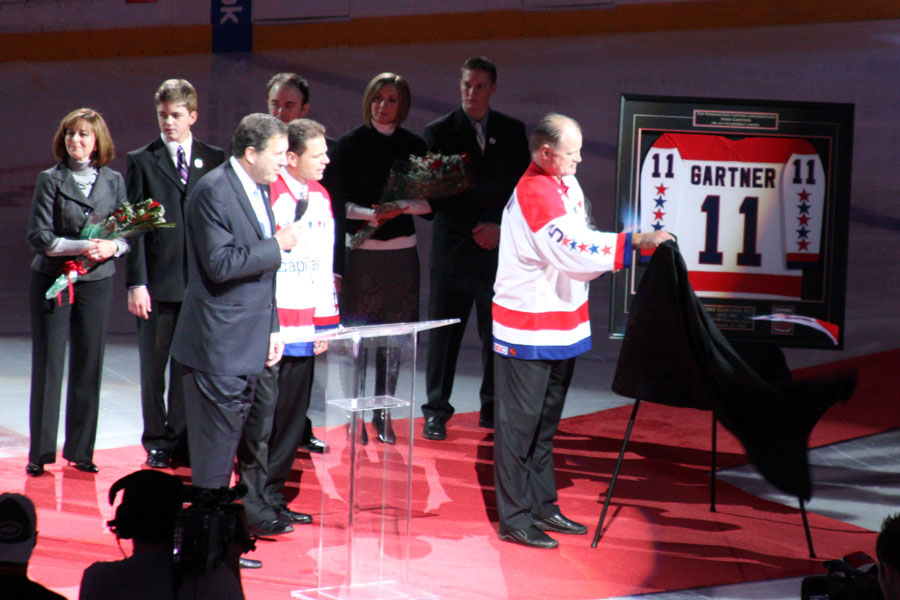
Gartner has his number retired by the Washington Capitals in 2008.

In the 1993–94 season, Gartner had another productive year, albeit for two teams. On 21 March, 1994, he was traded to the Toronto Maple Leafs for Glenn Anderson, a minor leaguer, and a draft pick at the trade deadline. The deal was driven by Rangers head coach Mike Keenan who disliked Gartner for his lack of grit and disappointing performances in the playoffs. Rangers general manager Neil Smith convinced his Maple Leafs counterpart Cliff Fletcher to agree to the trade by noting that Gartner had one year left on his contract while Anderson was expected to become a free agent at season's end. He finished with 34 goals and 30 assists to become the first player in NHL history with fifteen 30-goal seasons for a career. In the 1994 Stanley Cup playoffs, Gartner scored the final goal at Chicago Stadium, doing so in an 1–0 victory in Game 6 to eliminate the Chicago Blackhawks in the first round. The Leafs advanced all the way to the Western Conference Finals but lost in five games to the Vancouver Canucks; he had five goals in the playoffs but none past the second round. The Rangers ultimately won the Stanley Cup, and it was noted later that Gartner (who was at the time president of the NHLPA) helped ensure that Eddie Olczyk and Mike Hartman would be granted an exemption to have their names engraved on the Cup for New York despite not reaching the minimum games threshold.

Gartner played with the Leafs until 1996, when he was traded on June 22 to the Phoenix Coyotes, who had just re-located from Winnipeg, in exchange for a fourth-round draft pick in the 1996 NHL Draft (Vladimir Antipov), which was seen at the time as a low return for Toronto. After being shutout in the first game as the Coyotes to start the 1996–97 season, Gartner scored the first goal and hat trick in Phoenix history in the following game on October 7 against the Boston Bruins. He played in all 82 games of the 1996–97 season, recording 32 goals with 31 assists for his 17th and final 30-goal season. On February 8, 1997, he became just the sixth player in NHL history with 600 goals and 600 assists when he contributed an assist against the Dallas Stars. He was limited to 60 games of the 1997–98 season due to a partially torn medial collateral ligament suffered in a 2 November game against Calgary. He was placed on waivers but was not selected by any team, which meant he stayed with the Coyotes. He returned to action one month later.

On 14 December, he scored his 700th career goal against the Detroit Red Wings, doing so against Chris Osgood at America West Arena. He announced his retirement on 26 August, 1998.

== Hockey administrator ==
Gartner was active with the NHL Players Association. He served as president of the NHLPA from 1996 until his retirement in 1998 and served as Chairman of the Goals & Dreams program with the NHLPA. Gartner resigned from the NHLPA on 19 March 2007 in light of the controvery surrounding the transition of Ted Saskin succeeding Bob Goodenow as executive director of the NHLPA.

Gartner was appointed to be a member of the Hockey Hall of Fame Selection Committee in 2009. He rose to the position of chair of the committee in 2022. His 15-year tenure on the committee concluded in 2024. He was announced as chair-elect of the Hall as a whole, to replace Lanny McDonald whose term expired in June 2025.

== Playing style ==
Gartner was known for his blazing on-ice speed and ability to beat defenders down the ice. The Washington Capitals retired Gartner's #11 in a ceremony before their game against the Toronto Maple Leafs on 28 December 2008.

During the 1996 Super Skills competition, Gartner had set the record for the fastest skater event with a time of 13.386 (full course standing start). The record stood for 20 years until Dylan Larkin of the Detroit Red Wings broke it with a skating/running start 2016. In the 2017 All-Star Game, Connor McDavid of the Edmonton Oilers set a time of 13.310 beating Gartner (standing start) but not Larkin (running start).

== Legacy ==
Gartner never won the Stanley Cup nor played in the Cup Finals, never won an NHL award, and was never named to the postseason All-Star Team. Gartner was a member of the New York Rangers team that would go on to win the championship in 1994, but he was traded to Toronto at the trade deadline. Gartner got farther than he ever would in the playoffs that same year, as the Maple Leafs made it to the Western Conference Finals before losing to the Vancouver Canucks in five games. He was traded close to the NHL trading deadline three times in his career, and in a combined 35 games with his new teams during the regular season after the mid-season deals, he had 24 goals, 18 assists, 42 points, and a +16 rating. He led his team in goals nine times during his career and scored 30 or more goals each year for the first 15 seasons of his NHL career, setting a record. Despite scoring 50 goals only once in a single season, Gartner became only the fifth player in NHL history to reach 700 goals.

In 1998, Gartner was ranked number 89 on The Hockey News' list of the 100 Greatest Hockey Players. In 2001 he was inducted into the Hockey Hall of Fame in his first year of eligibility. He was one of the three final WHA players still active in professional hockey (Mark Messier and Wayne Gretzky being the last two) at the time of his retirement. In 2012, he was inducted into the World Hockey Association Hall of Fame in the "Legends of the Game" category.

Gartner is one of only eight players in NHL history to score 700 career goals. In 2017 he was named to NHL's 100th anniversary list of the 100 Greatest NHL Players in history. He was the NHL's Player of the Week for the weeks ending 22 February 1987 and 26 November 1989, and was the NHL's Player of the Month for February 1987, becoming first Capital to win the award. He was an NHL All-Star Game MVP in 1993, was the NHL's Fastest Skater at the All-Star Game Skills Competition in 1991, 1993 and 1996, and played in the NHL All-Star Game seven times (1981, 1985, 1986, 1988, 1990, 1993, 1996).

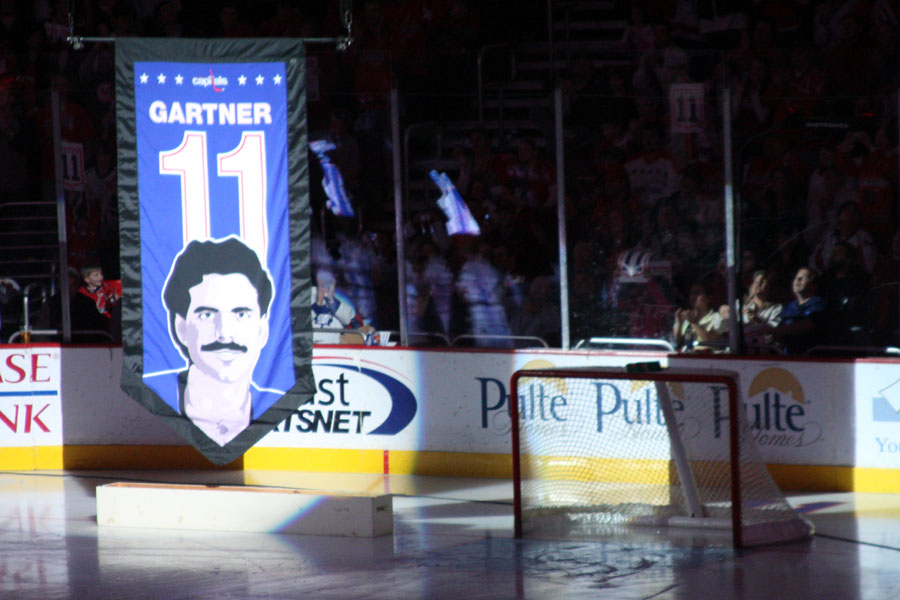
Mike Gartner had his jersey retired by the Washington Capitals in 2008. The banner shown here has since been replaced.

His jersey was number #11 retired by Washington Capitals on 28 December 2008. In the 2009 book 100 Ranger Greats, he was ranked No. 67 all-time of the 901 New York Rangers who had played during the team's first 82 seasons.

Gartner shares the NHL record for most consecutive 30-goal seasons (15), alongside Jaromir Jagr and Alexander Ovechkin. He held the record for most 30-goal seasons with 17 until he was passed by Ovechkin in the 2024–25 season. He also holds NHL records for most goals in an All-Star Game, four, in 1993 (shared with Wayne Gretzky, Dany Heatley and others) and for fastest two goals from the start of an All-Star Game in 3:37 in 1993. He holds the Washington Capitals records for longest point-streak with 17 games (twice), longest goal-scoring-streak (1986–87), nine games (shares record), most shorthanded goals in a season (1986–87), six (shares record), and most points by a right winger in one season (1984–85) with 102.

He was named by The Athletic as the 67th best player of the NHL modern era in 2022.

== Career statistics ==
=== Regular season and playoffs ===
| | | | Regular season | | | | | Playoffs |
| Season | Team | League | GP | G | A | Pts | PIM | GP | G | A | Pts | PIM |
|---|---|---|---|---|---|---|---|---|---|---|---|---|
| 1975–76 | Toronto Young Nationals | MTHL | 26 | 18 | 18 | 36 | 46 | — | — | — | — | — |
| 1975–76 | St. Catharines Black Hawks | OMJHL | 3 | 1 | 3 | 4 | 0 | 4 | 1 | 0 | 1 | 2 |
| 1976–77 | Niagara Falls Flyers | OMJHL | 62 | 33 | 42 | 75 | 125 | — | — | — | — | — |
| 1977–78 | Niagara Falls Flyers | OMJHL | 64 | 41 | 49 | 90 | 56 | — | — | — | — | — |
| 1978–79 | Cincinnati Stingers | WHA | 78 | 27 | 25 | 52 | 123 | 3 | 0 | 2 | 2 | 2 |
| 1979–80 | Washington Capitals | NHL | 77 | 36 | 32 | 68 | 66 | — | — | — | — | — |
| 1980–81 | Washington Capitals | NHL | 80 | 48 | 46 | 94 | 100 | — | — | — | — | — |
| 1981–82 | Washington Capitals | NHL | 80 | 35 | 45 | 80 | 121 | — | — | — | — | — |
| 1982–83 | Washington Capitals | NHL | 73 | 38 | 38 | 76 | 54 | 4 | 0 | 0 | 0 | 4 |
| 1983–84 | Washington Capitals | NHL | 80 | 40 | 45 | 85 | 90 | 8 | 3 | 7 | 10 | 16 |
| 1984–85 | Washington Capitals | NHL | 80 | 50 | 52 | 102 | 71 | 5 | 4 | 3 | 7 | 9 |
| 1985–86 | Washington Capitals | NHL | 74 | 35 | 40 | 75 | 63 | 9 | 2 | 10 | 12 | 4 |
| 1986–87 | Washington Capitals | NHL | 78 | 41 | 32 | 73 | 61 | 7 | 4 | 3 | 7 | 14 |
| 1987–88 | Washington Capitals | NHL | 80 | 48 | 33 | 81 | 73 | 14 | 3 | 4 | 7 | 14 |
| 1988–89 | Washington Capitals | NHL | 56 | 26 | 29 | 55 | 71 | — | — | — | — | — |
| 1988–89 | Minnesota North Stars | NHL | 13 | 7 | 7 | 14 | 2 | 5 | 0 | 0 | 0 | 6 |
| 1989–90 | Minnesota North Stars | NHL | 67 | 34 | 36 | 70 | 32 | — | — | — | — | — |
| 1989–90 | New York Rangers | NHL | 12 | 11 | 5 | 16 | 6 | 10 | 5 | 3 | 8 | 12 |
| 1990–91 | New York Rangers | NHL | 79 | 49 | 20 | 69 | 53 | 6 | 1 | 1 | 2 | 0 |
| 1991–92 | New York Rangers | NHL | 76 | 40 | 41 | 81 | 55 | 13 | 8 | 8 | 16 | 4 |
| 1992–93 | New York Rangers | NHL | 84 | 45 | 23 | 68 | 59 | — | — | — | — | — |
| 1993–94 | New York Rangers | NHL | 71 | 28 | 24 | 52 | 58 | — | — | — | — | — |
| 1993–94 | Toronto Maple Leafs | NHL | 10 | 6 | 6 | 12 | 4 | 18 | 5 | 6 | 11 | 14 |
| 1994–95 | Toronto Maple Leafs | NHL | 38 | 12 | 8 | 20 | 6 | 5 | 2 | 2 | 4 | 2 |
| 1995–96 | Toronto Maple Leafs | NHL | 82 | 35 | 19 | 54 | 52 | 6 | 4 | 1 | 5 | 4 |
| 1996–97 | Phoenix Coyotes | NHL | 82 | 32 | 31 | 63 | 38 | 7 | 1 | 2 | 3 | 4 |
| 1997–98 | Phoenix Coyotes | NHL | 60 | 12 | 15 | 27 | 24 | 5 | 1 | 0 | 1 | 18 |
| WHA totals | | | 78 | 27 | 25 | 52 | 123 | 3 | 0 | 2 | 2 | 2 |
| NHL totals | | | 1,432 | 708 | 627 | 1,335 | 1,159 | 122 | 43 | 50 | 93 | 125 |

=== International ===
| Year | Team | Event | GP | G | A | Pts | PIM |
|---|---|---|---|---|---|---|---|
| 1978 | Canada | WJC | 6 | 3 | 3 | 6 | 4 |
| 1981 | Canada | WC | 8 | 4 | 0 | 4 | 8 |
| 1982 | Canada | WC | 10 | 3 | 2 | 5 | 6 |
| 1983 | Canada | WC | 10 | 4 | 1 | 5 | 12 |
| 1984 | Canada | CC | 8 | 3 | 2 | 5 | 10 |
| 1987 | Canada | CC | 9 | 2 | 2 | 4 | 6 |
| 1993 | Canada | WC | 7 | 3 | 4 | 7 | 12 |
| Junior totals | | | 6 | 3 | 3 | 6 | 4 |
| Senior totals | | | 52 | 19 | 11 | 30 | 54 |

== Personal life ==
Gartner and his wife Colleen have two sons, Joshua and Dylan, and a daughter Natalie. Gartner is a born-again Christian, and was introduced to the faith during his playing days by former Washington teammate Jean Pronovost. His son, Josh, played goalie for Yale University and right wing for the Tuck School of Business A-Team in the Upper Valley Hockey League. Gartner and his former teammate, Wes Jarvis, are business partners and own three skating rinks in the Greater Toronto Area located in Newmarket, Ontario, Richmond Hill, Ontario, and Barrie, Ontario.

== See also ==
- List of members of the Hockey Hall of Fame
- Hockey Hall of Fame
- Cincinnati Stingers
- List of NHL statistical leaders
- List of NHL players with 1,000 points
- List of NHL players with 500 goals
- List of NHL players with 50 goal seasons
- List of NHL players with 100 point seasons

Awards and achievements
| Preceded by Tim Coulis | Washington Capitals first-round draft pick 1979 | Succeeded by Darren Veitch |
Sporting positions
| Preceded by Doug Wilson | NHLPA President; 13 September 1993 – 1998 | Succeeded by Trevor Linden |
