= Richie Regehr =

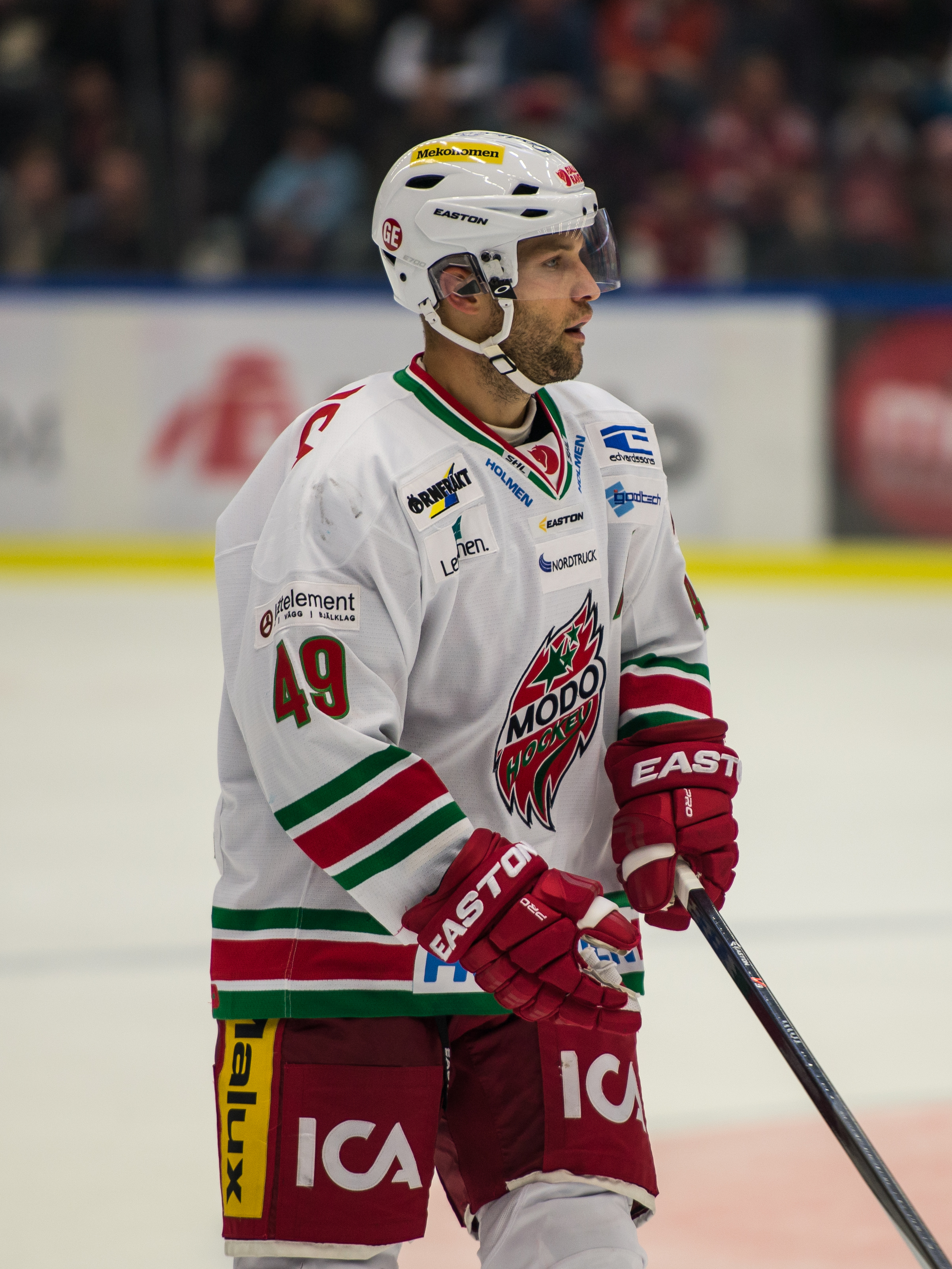
- Regehr with Modo Hockey in 2013
- Born: January 17, 1983 (age 43) Bandung, Indonesia
- Height: 6 ft 0 in (183 cm)
- Weight: 195 lb (88 kg; 13 st 13 lb)
- Position: Defence
- Shoots: Right
- EBEL team Former teams: EC KAC; Calgary Flames; Frankfurt Lions; Eisbären Berlin; Modo Hockey; EHC München
- NHL draft: Undrafted
- Playing career: 2004–present

Richard Regehr (born January 17, 1983) is an Indonesian-born Canadian former professional ice hockey defenceman. Regehr's older brother is former Stanley Cup-winning defenceman Robyn Regehr.

== Early life ==
Regehr was born in Bandung, Indonesia to Canadian Mennonite missionaries. They later returned to Canada where he grew up in Rosthern, Saskatchewan.

== Playing career ==
Regehr was signed as a free agent on July 6, 2004, as an undrafted player by the Calgary Flames, the team where his brother Robyn was playing. During the 2004–05 NHL lockout Richie Regehr played for the Lowell Lock Monsters, who were the American Hockey League affiliate of the Flames. In the 2005–06 season, he was sent to the Flames' new farm team, Omaha Ak-Sar-Ben Knights. After injuries to defencemen Rhett Warrener and Roman Hamrlík late in 2005, Regehr was called up to the Flames.

In his first National Hockey League game on December 29, 2005, he dressed with his brother Robyn and scored an assist on the game-winning goal. After only 3 games the Flames sent him back down to the Ak-Sar-Ben Knights, but on January 7 he was once again recalled. Regehr was recalled by Calgary again on February 2, 2006.

Regehr replaced Knights teammate Mark Giordano (who was recalled to the Calgary Flames) on the 2006 Canadian AHL All-Star team. He registered a goal and an assist in the All-Star game.

In the 2007–08 season, he moved to Germany, joining Deutsche Eishockey Liga (DEL) club Frankfurt Lions. The following year, he signed with fellow DEL side Eisbären Berlin.

After four impressive seasons with Berlin and winning three German championships with the club, Regehr left to sign a two-year contract in the Swedish Elitserien with Modo Hockey on April 25, 2012.

Regehr returned to Germany after his contract with Modo, signing a one-year deal with EHC München of the DEL on May 26, 2014. He eventually stayed in München until the conclusion of the 2016–17 season. He had won back-to-back German championships with München in 2016 and 2017 and signed with EC KAC of the Austrian Hockey League in May 2017.

== Records ==
- DEL – Most goals in a game by a defenceman: five (October 31, 2007)

== Career statistics ==
			Regular season					Playoffs
Season	Team	League	GP	G	A	Pts	PIM	GP	G	A	Pts	PIM
1998–99	Kelowna Rockets	WHL	2	0	0	0	0	—	—	—	—	—
1999–00	Kelowna Rockets	WHL	50	6	8	14	22	5	0	1	1	0
2000–01	Kelowna Rockets	WHL	71	10	27	37	68	6	0	1	1	4
2001–02	Portland Winter Hawks	WHL	52	8	36	44	62	7	2	5	7	8
2002–03	Portland Winter Hawks	WHL	67	16	45	61	115	7	2	2	4	8
2003–04	Portland Winter Hawks	WHL	65	9	34	43	88	5	0	1	1	6
2004–05	Lowell Lock Monsters	AHL	64	9	16	25	60	11	1	6	7	2
2005–06	Omaha Ak-Sar-Ben Knights	AHL	31	3	15	18	34	—	—	—	—	—
2005–06	Calgary Flames	NHL	14	0	2	2	6	—	—	—	—	—
2006–07	Omaha Ak-Sar-Ben Knights	AHL	22	5	9	14	37	—	—	—	—	—
2006–07	Calgary Flames	NHL	6	1	1	2	0	—	—	—	—	—
2007–08	Frankfurt Lions	DEL	44	21	20	41	62	10	3	3	6	14
2008–09	Eisbären Berlin	DEL	43	15	18	33	62	8	4	4	8	8
2009–10	Eisbären Berlin	DEL	55	15	24	39	66	5	1	3	4	4
2010–11	Eisbären Berlin	DEL	38	8	13	21	26	12	2	7	9	20
2011–12	Eisbären Berlin	DEL	48	11	26	37	91	12	3	3	6	10
2012–13	Modo Hockey	SEL	53	8	25	33	44	5	0	3	3	6
2013–14	Modo Hockey	SHL	52	6	16	22	50	2	1	1	2	29
2014–15	EHC München	DEL	51	10	30	40	47	4	1	0	1	27
2015–16	EHC München	DEL	38	4	14	18	30	—	—	—	—	—
2016–17	EHC München	DEL	44	3	13	16	20	14	0	2	2	8
2017-18	EC KAC	EBEL	6	1	1	2	8	—	—	—	—	—
NHL totals			20	1	3	4	6	—	—	—	—	—

== Awards and honours ==
Award	Year
WHL
West Second All-Star Team	2004
AHL
All-Star Game	2006
DEL
All-Star Game	2008, 2009
Most Goals, Defenseman	2008
Champion (Eisbären Berlin)	2009, 2011, 2012
European Trophy Champion	2011
Champion (EHC München)	2016, 2017
