= National Hockey League Players' Association =

North American labour union

NHLPA
- National Hockey League Players' Association
- French: Association des joueurs de la Ligue nationale de hockey
- Founded: June 1967
- Headquarters: 10 Bay Street, Suite 1200; Toronto, Ontario, Canada M5J 2R8
- Location(s): Canada; United States
- Members: 750+
- Executive Director: Marty Walsh
- Main organ: Executive Board
- Affiliations: AFL-CIO
- Website: nhlpa.com

The NHLPA's old logo

The National Hockey League Players' Association (NHLPA, French: Association des joueurs de la Ligue nationale de hockey (AJLNH)) is the labour union for the group of professional hockey players who are under Standard Player Contracts to the 32 member clubs in the National Hockey League (NHL) located in the United States and Canada. The association represents its membership in all matters dealing with their working conditions and contractual rights as well as serving as their exclusive collective bargaining agent.

== History ==
=== First organizing efforts (1957–1959) ===
The first NHLPA was formed in 1957, led by Ted Lindsay of the Detroit Red Wings and Doug Harvey of the Montreal Canadiens, after the league had refused to release pension plan financial information. The owners sabotaged the certification of the union by, in part, trading players involved with the association or sending them to the minor leagues. After an out-of-court settlement over several players' issues, the players disbanded the organization. Lindsay's struggle and the NHL's union busting efforts are dramatized in the movie Net Worth.

=== Alan Eagleson era (1967–1991) ===
The association formed in June 1967, when representatives of the six NHL teams met and elected Bob Pulford their first president and appointed Alan Eagleson as its executive director.

To prevent the new NHLPA from suffering the fate of its predecessor, Pulford met with the owners of the NHL teams and demanded they recognize the new union or the union would seek official recognition from the Canadian Industrial Relations Board (CIRB).

Additionally, the players sought guarantees where no member of the new union would be punished for being a member. The owners acceded.

In return, the NHLPA agreed it should represent at least two-thirds of the active players in the NHL and that the players would refrain from striking for the duration of the agreement, so long as the owners did not contravene any terms or conditions.

Eagleson stayed on until the end of 1991, when the players replaced him with Bob Goodenow, who had served as deputy director of the NHLPA since 1990. Eagleson went on to face criminal charges relating to his conduct during the time he worked at the NHLPA, and ultimately, on January 6, 1998, pleaded guilty in a Boston court to three counts of fraud, agreeing also to pay a fine of CA$1,000,000. The following day in Toronto, Eagleson pleaded guilty to another three counts of fraud and was sentenced to 18 months in jail.

=== Bob Goodenow era (1992–2005) ===
Bob Goodenow served executive director of the NHLPA for 13 years. In a departure to Eagleson who had been cozy with most NHL owners, Goodenow had a more confrontational tone. He led all NHLPA members through the strike of 1992 on the eve of the 1992 Stanley Cup Playoffs, which most notably gave players the rights to the marketing of their own images, and fundamentally altered the relationship between the league and its players. Longtime NHL president John Ziegler Jr. was forced out of office by the owners as a result of the settlement that resolved the ten-day strike.

In 1994–95, NHL players endured a lockout. The NHL owners were strongly in favor of a salary cap while the players were opposed. The NHL also wanted to levy a luxury tax, but the NHLPA viewed that as a variation on a salary cap and refused to accept it. The NHL wanted to tie salaries to revenue in order to subsidize the operation of weaker teams, while the NHLPA sought revenue sharing to help the smaller market teams. After the lockout had dragged on, the talk of salary cap faded and new items entered the debate, including a rookie salary cap, changes to the arbitration system, and loosened free agency. Ultimately, large market teams such as Toronto, Detroit, the New York Rangers, Dallas, and Philadelphia eventually broke with the league, as they feared that an extended lockout would outweigh the benefits from getting a salary cap or implementing a luxury tax and didn't want to be the first league in North America to forfeit an entire season just to help out their small-market colleagues.

A decade later, in 2004–05, the owners locked out the players again, becoming the first professional sports league to cancel an entire season. The NHLPA disputed the league's financial claims that most owners lost money, and Goodenow's mistrust of the league was supported by a November 2004 Forbes report that estimated the NHL's losses were less than half the amounts claimed by the league. The NHLPA suggested that the NHL's goal of "cost certainty" was little more than a euphemism for a salary cap, which the NHLPA had vowed never to accept. The union rejected each of the six concepts presented by the NHL, claiming they all contained some form of salary cap. The NHLPA preferred to retain the existing "marketplace" system where players individually negotiate contracts with teams, and teams have complete control of how much they want to spend on players. This time the NHL used a gag order to prevent owners from speaking up, which prevented the large market teams from breaking ranks as they did in 1994-95. Ending up, the NHLPA largely acceded to the NHL's demands. Goodenow would depart following the lockout, notifying the players of his resignation in July 2005.

=== Ted Saskin era (2005–2007) ===
Goodenow was forced out, in favor of long-time NHLPA Senior Director Ted Saskin as his successor, drawing on his knowledge in negotiating the collective bargaining agreement that ended the 2004-05 lockout, which contrasted with Goodenow's hardline approach.

The NHLPA Executive Board terminated the employment of Saskin as executive director and general counsel on May 10, 2007, following alleged acts of misconduct. Toronto employment lawyer Chris Paliare concluded Saskin and executive Ken Kim, beginning in September 2005 through January 2007, covertly accessed player email accounts.

=== Paul Kelly era (2007–2009) ===
On June 28, 2007, the NHLPA's executive board selected Michael Cammalleri (Calgary Flames), Chris Chelios (retired), Shawn Horcoff (Edmonton Oilers), Eric Lindros (retired) and Robyn Regehr (retired) to form a search committee for a new executive director. With the assistance of Reilly Partners, an executive search firm from Chicago, the search committee would review the resumes of hundreds of candidates.

The committee would ultimately recommend that Paul V. Kelly, a founding partner of Kelly, Libby and Hoopes law firm in Boston, become the fourth executive director since the NHLPA's inception in 1967. Through a secret ballot system, the Player Representatives voted in favour of the committee's recommendation, and Kelly would be introduced at a media conference on October 24, 2007.

On December 7, 2007, the NHLPA and the David Suzuki Foundation decided to create a pact, led by Boston Bruins defenceman Andrew Ference, which had over 500 NHL players signed up to donate $290 annually to purchase carbon credits in order to offset their regular season travel.

On August 31, 2009, Paul Kelly was fired from the NHLPA.

On October 30, 2009, interim Executive Director Ian Penny resigned.

=== Donald Fehr era (2010–2023) ===
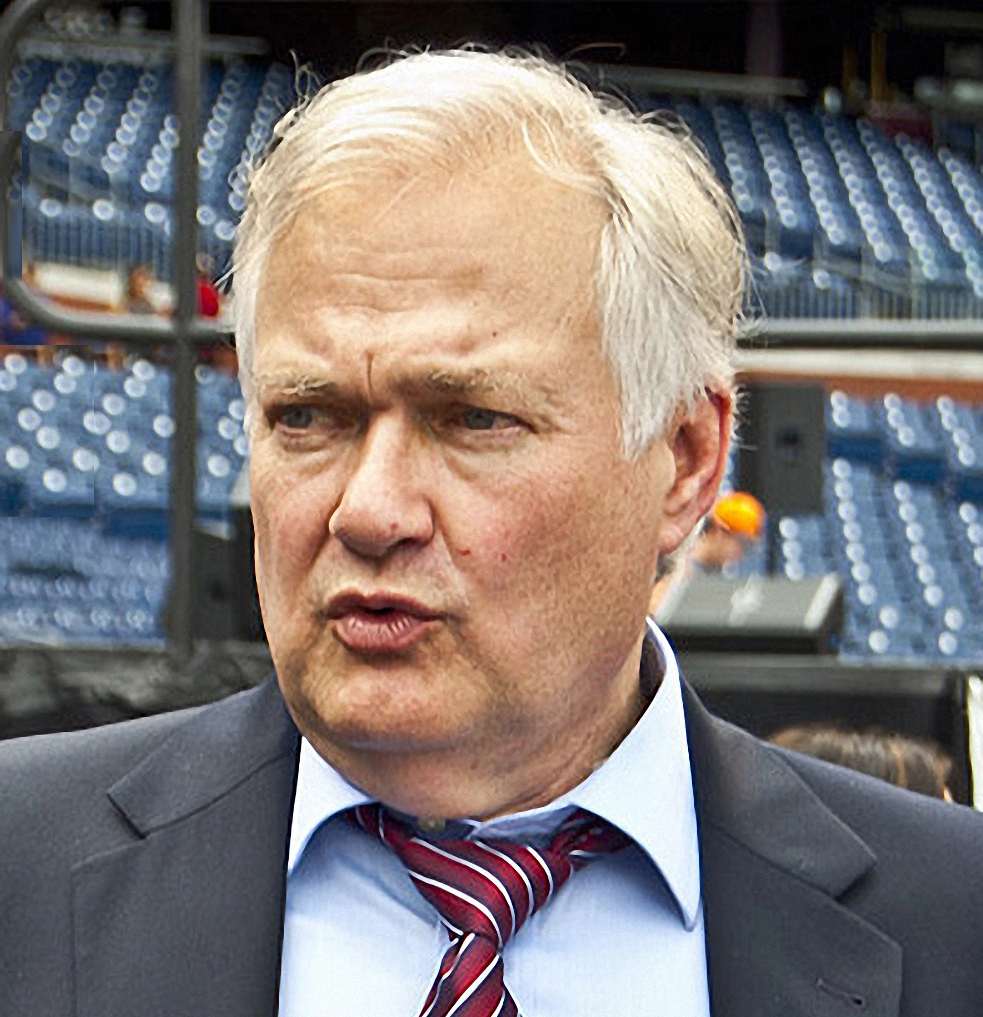
Donald Fehr (2011)

Following Ian Penny's resignation, board members, such as Steve Larmer, also resigned. In late August 2010, it was widely speculated that former Major League Baseball Players Association Executive Director Donald Fehr would be appointed to this position. However, a day after the speculation reached a climax on August 26, both NHLPA interim director Mike Ouellet and deputy commissioner and chief legal officer of the NHL Bill Daly disputed the claims that it is all hearsay, and nothing is concrete between the NHLPA and Donald Fehr. However, Fehr would be formally named as executive director later in 2010.

On January 6, 2012, the NHLPA rejected a proposal for realignment in the league for beginning in the 2012–13 season, which impacted CBA discussions.

On September 15, 2012, with no agreement being reached on a new CBA, the owners locked out the players, thus threatening the start of the 2012–13 NHL season. Three months later, on December 14, the NHL filed a class action suit with the U.S. District Court in New York seeking to establish the lockout was legal. They also filed an unfair labor practice charge with the U.S. National Labor Relations Board, stating the union had been negotiating in bad faith and their threat to disclaim interest is a negotiating ploy which violates the collective bargaining process. On December 21, a person told the Associated Press a vote was cast to give the NHLPA executive board a chance to file a disclaimer of interest, with the vote in favor 706–22. The board had until January 2, 2013, to file the disclaimer, in which case the union would have dissolved and became a trade organization, which would have allowed players to file antitrust lawsuits against the NHL.

On January 6, the NHLPA reached a tentative agreement with the NHL to end the lockout. The NHLPA then approved a league proposal for realignment in the league beginning in the 2013–14 season.

In 2023, it was announced Fehr would be replaced as Executive Director by former United States Secretary of Labor Marty Walsh.

=== Marty Walsh era (2023–present) ===
On July 8, 2025, the NHLPA membership and the NHL Board of Governors ratified a four-year collective bargaining agreement running through the 2029–30 season.

== Organization ==
While the management of daily operations is the responsibility of the NHLPA Executive Director, the ultimate control over all NHLPA activities resides with the players, who each year elect representatives in order to form an executive board. Each of the 32 teams has one representative on the board. The NHLPA also certifies player agents; only NHLPA-certified agents may represent players in their dealings with NHL clubs.

== Executive Directors ==
- Alan Eagleson, 1967–91
- Vacant, 1991–92
- Bob Goodenow, 1992–2005
- Ted Saskin, 2005–07
- Paul Kelly, 2007 – August 31, 2009
- Ian Penny (interim), August 31, 2009 – October 30, 2009
- Mike Ouellet (interim), October 30, 2009 – December 18, 2010
- Donald Fehr, December 18, 2010 – February 16, 2023
- Marty Walsh, March 13, 2023 – present

== Presidents ==
- Ted Lindsay (1957–1958)
- Bob Pulford (1967–1972)
- Ken Dryden (1972–1974)
- Pit Martin (1974–1975)
- Bobby Clarke (1975–1979)
- Phil Esposito (1979 – February 10, 1981)
- Tony Esposito (February 10, 1981 – October 24, 1984)
- Bryan Trottier (October 24, 1984 – November 9, 1992)
- Doug Wilson (November 9, 1992 – September 13, 1993)
- Mike Gartner (September 13, 1993 – 1998)
- Trevor Linden (1998–2006)

== Executive Board members ==
The following is the list of NHLPA Executive Board members from each team for the 2025-26 NHL season.

Club	Representative	Alternate
Anaheim Ducks	Frank Vatrano	Jackson LaCombe
Boston Bruins	Nikita Zadorov	N/A
Buffalo Sabres	Jason Zucker	Alex Tuch
Calgary Flames	Kevin Bahl	Connor Zary
Carolina Hurricanes	Jordan Martinook	Eric Robinson
Chicago Blackhawks	Alex Vlasic	Wyatt Kaiser
Colorado Avalanche	Logan O'Connor	Josh Manson
Columbus Blue Jackets	Boone Jenner	Erik Gudbranson
Dallas Stars	Jason Robertson	Jake Oettinger
Detroit Red Wings	Dylan Larkin	Andrew Copp
Edmonton Oilers	Trent Frederic	Ty Emberson
Florida Panthers	Aaron Ekblad	Sam Reinhart
Los Angeles Kings	Mikey Anderson	N/A
Minnesota Wild	Marcus Foligno	Ryan Hartman
Montreal Canadiens	Mike Matheson	Brendan Gallagher
Nashville Predators	Nicolas Hague	Roman Josi
New Jersey Devils	Nico Hischier	Brenden Dillon
New York Islanders	Anders Lee	Scott Mayfield
New York Rangers	Adam Fox	Will Cuylle
Ottawa Senators	Brady Tkachuk	Thomas Chabot
Philadelphia Flyers	Travis Sanheim	Garnet Hathaway
Pittsburgh Penguins	Kris Letang	N/A
San Jose Sharks	Tyler Toffoli	N/A
Seattle Kraken	Jordan Eberle	Matty Beniers
St. Louis Blues	Colton Parayko	Robert Thomas
Tampa Bay Lightning	Nick Paul	Anthony Cirelli
Toronto Maple Leafs	Morgan Rielly	John Tavares
Utah Mammoth	Sean Durzi	Barrett Hayton
Vancouver Canucks	Drew O'Connor	Zeev Buium
Vegas Golden Knights	Colton Sissons	Kaedan Korczak
Washington Capitals	Tom Wilson	Trevor van Riemsdyk
Winnipeg Jets	Adam Lowry	Mark Scheifele

== See also ==
=== Related ===
- Hockey Fights Cancer
- Professional Hockey Players' Association

=== Similar organizations ===
- Major League Baseball Players Association
- National Basketball Players Association
- NFL Players Association
- MLS Players Association
