= Bob Goodenow =

American lawyer (1952–2025)

2nd Executive Director of the NHL Players Association
- In office January 1, 1992 – July 28, 2005
- Preceded by: Alan Eagleson
- Succeeded by: Ted Saskin

Personal details
- Born: Robert William Goodenow; October 29, 1952 Dearborn, Michigan, U.S.
- Died: September 13, 2025 (aged 72) Plymouth, Michigan, U.S.
- Spouse: Wendy Schrock (m. 1977)
- Children: 3
- Education: Harvard University (AB); University of Detroit Law School (JD)
- Occupation: Attorney

Robert William Goodenow (October 29, 1952 – September 13, 2025) was an American lawyer who served as the second executive director of the NHL Players Association from 1992 until his resignation in 2005.

== Background ==
Goodenow was born in Dearborn, Michigan, on October 29, 1952. He graduated from Harvard University in 1974, where he had studied government and played hockey, and from the University of Detroit Law School in 1979. He played for the United States men's national ice hockey team in the mid-1970s.

== Career ==
Early in his legal career, Goodenow's clients included companies in labor disputes. However, in 1990, he joined the NHLPA, and succeeded Alan Eagleson as the head of the NHLPA on January 1, 1992, upon Eagleson's resignation. In his first couple months on the job, he led the players out on a 10-day strike on the eve of the Stanley Cup playoffs.

Two years later, Goodenow and NHL Commissioner Gary Bettman oversaw a 103-day lockout that lasted from October 1, 1994, to January 11, 1995.

Goodenow was also the NHLPA's Executive Director during the 2004–05 labor dispute, which resulted in the cancellation of the 2004–05 NHL season. A tentative agreement was reached on July 13, 2005.

On July 28, 2005, Goodenow was asked to step down as NHLPA chief and was replaced by Ted Saskin, NHLPA Senior Director of Business Affairs and Licensing and the head negotiator during the CBA contract talks. This resignation came less than two weeks after the NHL and the NHLPA came to the new CBA.

On December 15, 2007, TSN reported that Goodenow had been hired by Russian businessman Alexander Medvedev to help in the creation of a European hockey league to rival the NHL. The Kontinental Hockey League was eventually formed a year later.

== Personal life and death ==
In 1977, Goodenow married Wendy Schrock, with whom he had three children. He died from a heart attack at his home in Plymouth, Michigan, on September 13, 2025, at the age of 72.

== Awards and honors ==
Award	Year
All-ECAC Hockey Second Team	1973–74

Preceded by Alan Eagleson	NHLPA Executive Director; 1992–2005	Succeeded by Ted Saskin
