= 2004–05 NHL lockout =

NHL labour dispute

- Date: September 16, 2004 – July 22, 2005 (10 months and 6 days)
- Location: United States; Canada
- Caused by: Expiration of the 1995 NHL Collective Bargaining Agreement; Failure to reach a new collective bargaining agreement ahead of the 2004–05 season; 76% of the NHL clubs' revenues were spent on team salaries prior to the end of the 2003–04 season due to the lack of a salary cap
- Goals: Salary cap; Revenue sharing; Luxury taxes
- Result: 2004–05 NHL season cancelled on February 16, 2005; NHL and NHLPA reach an agreement to end the lockout on July 13; New eight-year collective bargaining agreement signed on July 22; NHL becomes last of the four major North American professional sports leagues to adopt a salary cap or luxury tax; Team salary revenues reduced from 76% to 54%; Rule changes instituted for regular season games starting in the 2005–06 season, including the addition of a shootout; Bob Goodenow resigns as executive director of the NHLPA

Parties
National Hockey League Players' Association (NHLPA)	National Hockey League (NHL)

Lead figures
Bob Goodenow (executive director)	Gary Bettman (commissioner); Bill Daly (lead negotiator)

The 2004–05 NHL lockout was a labor lockout that resulted in the cancellation of the National Hockey League's 2004–2005 season, which would have been its 88th season of play.

The main dispute was the league's desire to implement a salary cap to limit expenditure on player salaries, which was opposed by the NHL Players Association (NHLPA), the players' labor union, who proposed an alternative system of revenue sharing.

Attempts at collective bargaining before the season began were unsuccessful. The lockout was initiated on September 16, 2004, one day after the expiration of the existing collective bargaining agreement (CBA), which itself had been the result of the 1994–95 lockout. During the lockout, further attempts to negotiate a new CBA floundered; with neither side willing to back down, the entire season was canceled on February 16, 2005. The NHL and NHLPA negotiating teams finally reached an agreement on July 13, 2005, with the lockout officially ending nine days later on July 22, after ratification by the NHL team owners and NHLPA members. The resulting CBA included both a salary cap and revenue sharing.

The lockout had lasted 10 months and 6 days, covering 1,230 unplayed games. As a result, the Stanley Cup was not awarded for the first time since 1919. Among the major professional sports leagues in North America, this was the first (and so far only) time a whole season was canceled because of a labor dispute, and the second time a postseason was canceled (after the 1994–95 MLB strike). Large numbers of NHL players elected to play in European leagues during the lockout.

== Issues ==
The NHL, led by Commissioner Gary Bettman, attempted to convince the players to accept a salary structure linking player salaries to league revenues, guaranteeing the clubs what the league called cost certainty. According to an NHL-commissioned report prepared by former U.S. Securities and Exchange Commission chairman Arthur Levitt, prior to 2004–05, NHL clubs spent about 76 percent of their gross revenues on players' salaries – a figure far higher than those in other North American sports – and collectively lost US$273 million during the 2002–03 season.

On July 20, 2004, the league presented the NHLPA with six concepts to achieve cost certainty. These concepts are believed to have included a hard, or inflexible, salary cap similar to the one used in the National Football League, a soft salary cap with some capped exceptions similar to the one used in the National Basketball Association, and a centralized salary negotiation system similar to that used in the Arena Football League and Major League Soccer: Bettman had earlier concluded that a luxury tax similar to the one used in Major League Baseball would not have satisfied the league's cost certainty objectives. While most sports commentators saw Bettman's plan as reasonable, some critics pointed out that a hard salary cap without any revenue sharing was an attempt to gain the support of the big market teams (such as Toronto, Montreal, Detroit, the New York Rangers, Vancouver, and Philadelphia) that did not support Bettman during the 1994–95 lockout.

The NHLPA, under executive director Bob Goodenow, disputed the league's financial claims. According to the union, "cost certainty" is little more than a euphemism for a salary cap, which it had vowed never to accept. The union rejected each of the six concepts presented by the NHL, claiming they all contained some form of salary cap. The NHLPA preferred to retain the existing "marketplace" system where players individually negotiate contracts with teams, and teams have complete control of how much they want to spend on players. Goodenow's mistrust of the league was supported by a November 2004 Forbes report that estimated the NHL's losses were less than half the amounts claimed by the league.

Several players also criticized the contracts that overpaid unproven players: one example was the 2002 Bobby Holik contract, in which the New York Rangers signed him to five years for $45 million. After two years, his contract was bought out by the Rangers: according to Glen Sather, the Rangers' president, "In the new world we live in, Bobby was just paid too much".

Although the NHL's numbers regarding financial losses were disputed, there was no question that several franchises were losing money: some had already declared bankruptcy, and others had held "fire sales" of franchise players, such as the Washington Capitals. Some small-market teams, such as the Pittsburgh Penguins and the remaining small-market Canadian teams, were actually hoping for a lockout, since those teams would make more money by losing a season.

The league did not have large television revenues in the United States, so the NHL was reliant on attendance revenues far more than other leagues: after the lockout of the 2004–05 season, NHL teams made on average only $3 million from television revenues. In addition, in May of the 2004–05 lockout, ESPN formally denied the option to show NHL games on the network due to low ratings in previous seasons. Many NHL teams had low attendance totals in seasons preceding the lockout.

== Negotiations ==
Prior to the lockout, the NHLPA had proposed a system in late 2003 that included revenue sharing, a luxury tax, a one-time 5% rollback in player salaries, and reforms to the league's entry level system. The league rejected this proposal point-blank, saying it essentially maintained the status quo in favor of the players.

Shortly before the lockout commenced on September 16, 2004, the NHLPA offered another proposal to the league, one that was believed to be similar to their earlier proposal. The league rejected the union's new offer, claiming the new proposal was worse than the one they rejected in 2003. At this point, negotiations stalled until early December, when the NHLPA made a highly anticipated proposal based on a luxury tax, increasing the proposed one-time rollback in players' salaries to 24%. The NHL rejected this offer, and put forward a counter-proposal that the union flatly rejected.

In late January 2005 - near what the hockey media believed to be the point of no return for the 2004–05 season - discussions were held by the negotiators from both sides, with Bettman and Goodenow not being invited.

The NHL was represented by Executive Vice President Bill Daly, outside counsel Bob Batterman, and NHL Board of Governors Chairman Harley Hotchkiss, who also co-owned the Calgary Flames. The NHLPA was represented by President Trevor Linden, Senior Director Ted Saskin, and associate counsel Ian Pulver. After four meetings, the sides remained deadlocked because of, according to Saskin, "significant philosophical differences."

Shortly after this series of meetings, Daly presented Saskin a proposal that the league believed made a number of concessions to the players, but was still based on a salary cap linked to revenues. The players' association rejected that proposal, saying that it was "not the basis for an agreement."

After these negotiations failed, Bettman declared on February 9 that if the lockout was not resolved by that weekend, there would be no hope of saving the season. When talks broke off between the NHL and the NHLPA the next morning, there had been no progress in negotiations.

On February 14, the union offered to accept a $52 million salary cap under the condition that it was not linked to league revenues, to which the league proposed a counteroffer of a $40 million cap plus $2.2 million in benefits, which the players association rejected. The next day, Bettman sent Goodenow a letter with a final proposal of a $42.5 million cap plus $2.2 million in benefits, setting a deadline of 11:00 the next morning to accept or refuse the offer. The NHLPA presented a counter-offer involving a $49 million cap, which the league rejected.

With no resolution by the 11:00 deadline, Bettman announced the cancellation of the 2004–05 season on February 16, 2005, making the NHL the first major professional sports league in North America to cancel an entire season because of a labor dispute: the announcement was to have come on February 14, but it was delayed because of the death of the patriarch of the Sutter hockey family four days prior, whose funeral was held on February 15. Two days after the cancellation announcement, The Hockey News reported that a deal with a $45 million cap had been reached "in principle" (meaning the sides have agreed, but nothing is signed) with the help of owners and former players Wayne Gretzky and Mario Lemieux; both camps immediately denied this report. An emergency 6½-hour meeting took place the next day, but no agreement was reached, formalizing the season's cancellation.

Bolstered by the thought of losing a second season to a labor dispute, the sides began meeting again in earnest in June, holding what sources to media would describe as "marathon sessions" in hopes of coming to an agreement. Ending June without a deal in place, the two sides reconvened early the following month, holding meetings on consecutive days from July 4 until July 13, when the parties finally agreed in principle to the terms of a new deal. According to reports, the July 12 session lasted through the night and until 6:00 on the morning of July 13, at which point the talks broke off for five hours, and resumed in time to complete the deal.

On July 21, the players association ratified the agreement with 87% of its members voting in favor; the 30 team owners unanimously approved it the next day, officially ending the 310-day lockout.

The salary cap would be adjusted each year to guarantee players 54% of total NHL revenues, and there would also be a salary floor. Player contracts are also guaranteed. The players' share will increase if revenues rise to specific benchmarks, while revenue sharing will split a pool of money from the 10 highest-grossing teams among the bottom 15. There was a $39 million cap in place for the first year of the CBA.

== Effects of the lockout ==
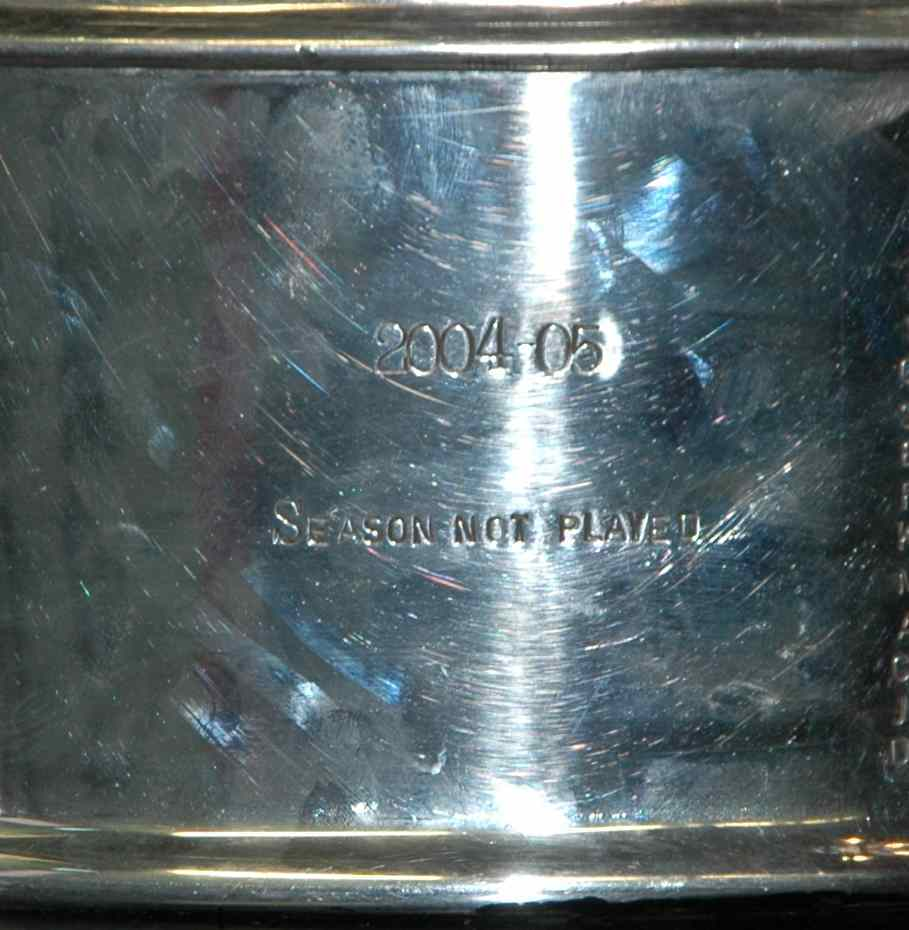
The words "2004–05 Season Not Played" engraved on the Stanley Cup, acknowledging the canceled 2004–05 season

A Canadian public opinion poll conducted by Ipsos-Reid near the start of the lockout found that 52 percent of those polled blamed NHL players for the lockout, whereas 21 percent blamed the owners of NHL teams. Also hurting the NHLPA was that its players had very visibly high salaries, which removed much sympathy from lower-to-middle class fans, with the NHLPA's cause being further harmed by Jeremy Roenick and several NHLPA executives making controversial statements that showed their disdain for owners and fans alike.

During the lockout, a movement arose to free the Stanley Cup from the NHL. By the original deed of Lord Stanley, the cup was a challenge cup open to the best amateur hockey team in Canada. Only since 1926 has it been exclusively competed for by NHL teams, and with the 2004–05 NHL season being cancelled, the group felt that the NHL had forfeited its right to award the Cup for the year. On February 7, 2006, a settlement was reached in which the trophy could be awarded to non-NHL teams should the league not operate for a season, although the NHL by that point was playing again.

=== Resolution ===
The loss of the 2004–05 season meant that, for the first time since the introduction of the NHL entry draft in 1963, there were no results on which to base the draft order. For the 2005 draft, the league settled on a lottery system in which all teams had a weighted chance at the first pick, expected to be Sidney Crosby. The lottery was tilted so teams with fewer playoff appearances over the last three seasons and fewer number one overall picks over the last four seasons had a better chance of landing higher picks. The complete order was determined by the lottery, and the draft was conducted in a "snake" style, meaning in even rounds, the draft order was reversed. This system was an attempt to compromise between those who felt all teams should have had an equal chance at the first pick and those who felt only the weaker teams should have been in the running.

To ease the transition to the salary cap, teams were allowed one week to buy out players at two-thirds the cost of their remaining contract, which would not count against the salary cap. Bought out players could not re-sign with the same team.

=== Effect on NHL and NHLPA ===
NHLPA Executive Director and General Counsel Bob Goodenow, seen by many as the biggest villain in the lockout because of his hardline stance against a salary cap, resigned from his position five days after the agreement was ratified amid criticism from many of his constituents. He was replaced by Ted Saskin, formerly senior director of business affairs and licensing for the NHLPA. Saskin was officially named executive director of the NHLPA on November 25, 2005, after the players' vote of confidence was confirmed by accounting firm PricewaterhouseCoopers.

NHL Executive Vice President and Chief Legal Officer Bill Daly was promoted to deputy commissioner after the lockout.

The lockout did help franchises better manage their finances and increase their value. Combined with finally receiving a stable national television rights deal in the United States with NBC and Versus (which later became sister networks due to the Comcast NBC merger) and the launch of the NHL Network, 26 of 30 NHL franchises saw an increase in value since before the lockout. Leading the way would be the Pittsburgh Penguins, a team cited even before the lockout to benefit from a lockout due to financial problems related to former team owner Howard Baldwin deferring player salaries in the 1990s (leading to the team's second bankruptcy in 1998) and former star player Mario Lemieux (who became the team's owner due to also being the team's largest creditor) dictating that the team cut costs in order to eliminate the debt from the Baldwin era. Since the lockout, the Penguins' value increased by a league-high 161.4%, due in no small part to the changing financial landscape of the NHL as well as winning the "Sidney Crosby sweepstakes" after the lockout ended and the construction of the Consol Energy Center (now PPG Paints Arena) to replace the aging Mellon Arena. The only teams that lost value from before the lockout were the Phoenix Coyotes (whose financial problems since the lockout have been well-documented), New York Islanders, Dallas Stars, and Colorado Avalanche.

==== Europe ====
The majority of players who agreed to play in other professional hockey leagues were playing in Europe. During the 2004–05 season, 388 NHL players played in European leagues. The most popular countries were Russia, with 78 NHL players, Sweden, with 75 NHL players, the Czech Republic, with 51 NHL players, Finland, with 45 NHL players and Switzerland with 43 NHL players. In many cases, players who had originally begun their careers in Europe returned to those same teams for the lockout.

Russian Superleague (now KHL) team AK Bars Kazan signed 11 NHL players, including Ilya Kovalchuk, Aleksey Morozov, and Vincent Lecavalier while Pavel Datsyuk played for HC Dynamo Moscow, Patrik Elias played for Czech HC JME Znojemští Orli and Russian Metallurg Magnitogorsk, and Czech superstar Jaromir Jagr played for HC Kladno and then Avangard Omsk. Morozov never returned to the NHL after 2004 (retiring from the KHL after the 2013–14 season), and Jagr would later play three additional seasons with Avangard.

Other Czech players returned to the Czech Republic, including Milan Hejduk (HC Pardubice), Martin Straka (HC Plzeň), Ales Hemsky (HC Pardubice) and Martin Rucinsky (HC Litvínov).

Swiss Nationalliga A had its own NHL stars when Canadians Joe Thornton and Rick Nash signed with HC Davos, Danny Briere and Dany Heatley signed with SC Bern of the Swiss league. This lockout was a major benefit for Swiss ice hockey.

Swedish superstar Peter Forsberg returned to his original club, Modo (although Forsberg had been planning on playing for Modo even if the season had been played). Also returning to Modo along with Forsberg were Canucks teammates Daniel Sedin, Henrik Sedin, and Markus Naslund, all of whom were originally drafted from Modo, while still others joined other Elitserien sides. Some Elitserien games were also being broadcast by Rogers Sportsnet in Canada.

Finnish SM-liiga had its share of players during the lockout. Notable Finnish players included Saku Koivu (TPS, his first professional team), Olli Jokinen (HIFK), Jarkko Ruutu (HIFK) and Vesa Toskala (Ilves). Teemu Selanne also made a contract with Jokerit where he began his professional career, but injuries prevented him from suiting up for the entire season. Foreign players included John Madden who played 2 games for HIFK, Sean Avery, who had a brief stint with the Pelicans, Brian Campbell who played for Jokerit and Hal Gill who played for Lukko. SM-liiga featured three top goaltenders as Dwayne Roloson played for Lukko, Tomas Vokoun played for HIFK and Tim Thomas (who had had three previous stints in the SM-liiga) played for Jokerit, leading his team to the championship finals and being awarded the league's most valuable player award. Finnish Mestis also featured NHL talent when Sami Kapanen and Kimmo Timonen played for KalPa. Timonen and Kapanen partially owned the team and the duo was joined by Adam Hall who also played for KalPa during the lockout.

Erik Cole, Olaf Kolzig, and Nathan Dempsey were among the notable players to go to Germany to play in the Deutsche Eishockey Liga.

A fair share of Slovak NHL players returned to their home country to play for various Slovak Extraliga sides during the lockout, including Pavol Demitra, Marián Hossa, Marián Gáborík (all in HK Dukla Trenčín), Miroslav Šatan and Ľubomír Višňovský (both in HC Slovan Bratislava), Michal Handzuš, Richard Zedník and Vladimír Országh (all in HKm Zvolen), Ladislav Nagy and Martin Štrbák (both in HC Košice), and Žigmund Pálffy (in HK 36 Skalica).

Latvian league club HK Riga 2000, which played also in the Belarusian Extraleague, signed several NHL players. Two of them were Latvians Karlis Skrastins and Sergei Zholtok and the third was American Darby Hendrickson, who was a close friend of Zholtok. After Zholtok died due to a heart condition, Hendrickson left the club, so that only Skrastins finished the season with the club.

A number of NHL players also went to Great Britain. In the Elite Ice Hockey League, Coventry Blaze signed Wade Belak, Cardiff Devils signed Rob Davison, London Racers signed Eric Cairns and Scott Nichol, and Nottingham Panthers signed Nick Boynton, Ian Moran, Steve McKenna. McKenna also used that season to play for the Adelaide Avalanche in the Australian Ice Hockey League. In the British National League, Guildford Flames signed Jamie McLennan and David Oliver, Bracknell Bees signed Brendan Witt while Newcastle Vipers signed Chris McAllister. In 2008, McCallister signed for the Vipers for a second time.

Chris Mason (Nashville), Scott Hartnell (Nashville) and Travis Brigley (Colorado) became Norwegian champions with Vålerenga Ishockey. In addition, Mark Bell, who at the time was playing for Chicago Blackhawks, played for the Norwegian GET-ligaen club Trondheim Black Panthers. Karl Dykhuis played in the Netherlands with the Amsterdam Bulldogs.

Several NHL players signed with teams in the Italian Serie A, including Eric Belanger with the Bolzano-Bozen Foxes, Craig Adams with the Milano Vipers, Matt Cullen with SG Cortina and Fernando Pisani with the SCL Tigers. Calgary Flames players Steve Montador and Steven Reinprecht won the French Ligue Magnus with HC Mulhouse.

Rob Niedermayer and Jason Strudwick played in the Hungarian league with Ferencvárosi TC.

Most of the NHL players playing for European clubs had contract clauses allowing them to leave for the NHL once the lockout ended.

==== North America ====
There were two attempts to form alternative professional leagues in North America during the lockout, but both failed. A revival of the World Hockey Association had been planned since 2002 and was to start play shortly after the lockout was expected to begin. Despite having former WHA star Bobby Hull as commissioner, the league never got off the ground. A lack of stable financing undermined plans to sign both locked-out players and top prospects such as Sidney Crosby.

Another league, the Original Stars Hockey League (OSHL), was established in Canada and expected to play four-on-four games between six teams (ostensibly representing the Original Six cities) in various Canadian cities until the lockout was settled. More than 100 players purportedly signed up to play in the OSHL. The league debuted on September 17, 2004 in Barrie, Ontario, Canada. In the inaugural game, "Toronto" defeated "Detroit" 16–13. The next and last game was played in Brampton, Ontario with "Boston" defeating "Montreal" 14–11. Jerseys worn by players were based on Original Six (Boston, Chicago, Detroit, Montreal, New York, Toronto), but all had the words "OSHL" in white, three stars patches on the shoulders instead of team logos or cities. However, escalating salary demands by players quickly bankrupted the league. Shortly after its first two games, OSHL president Randy Gumbley announced that the league had received firm commitments from only twenty players, and the league soon folded.

NHL players looking for a place to play clearly preferred stable, established European clubs to upstart leagues that were derisively dubbed as "fly-by-night" operations by their critics. A small number of players played for established minor league teams near their families and homes, while others chose to repay the league which gave them a start by returning.

The Motor City Mechanics of the UHL got a major boost during their first year in existence when the lockout officially started. The team signed Detroit Red Wings players Chris Chelios, Derian Hatcher, and Kris Draper. This happened because Derian Hatcher knew the team was playing at Great Lakes Sports City Superior Arena where he often played growing up. Because of visa problems Kris Draper never played a game for the Mechanics. Later on they also signed Bryan Smolinski and Sean Avery and were able to roll four NHL players on their opponents. All of the players had some experience or connection to the area.

The ECHL gained some players. Scott Gomez played for his hometown team, the Alaska Aces and won the ECHL's Most Valuable Player award, while Curtis Brown, whose wife is a native of Southern California, played for the San Diego Gulls, and Bates Battaglia joined his younger brother Anthony on the Mississippi Sea Wolves roster. A pair of Nashville Predators teammates, Shane Hnidy and Jeremy Stevenson, both of whom had early careers in the ECHL, returned to the league and found themselves playing against each other in the first round of the Kelly Cup playoffs, as Hnidy's Florida Everblades faced Stevenson's South Carolina Stingrays in the American Conference quarterfinals.

Some prospects who may have never had a serious look were given chances they thought they never would have. Undrafted journeyman Chris Minard had been signed with Alaska for his third season in the ECHL when the lockout allowed Davis Payne to assign him on the same line as Gomez at the Aces. Gomez saw a gem that led to the 2005 ECHL All-Star Game, and a top ECHL player that season; the pairing led to Gomez giving Minard a shot after the lockout ended, and he played his way into the AHL, and eventually signing a two-way contract with the Pittsburgh Penguins, receiving in 2007–08 his first call-up to the NHL. Minard said about the experience, "That's when I learned a lot about being a goal-scorer, playing with a guy like that who can pass the puck. It was a pretty cool experience."

In addition, many younger players who would be impact players on their NHL rosters stayed down in the American Hockey League for a full season – most notably Jason Spezza, who won the league scoring title and MVP awards – changing the aspect of that league's entire season. A record crowd of 20,103 fans packed the Wachovia Center in Philadelphia for Game Four of the Calder Cup finals between the Philadelphia Phantoms and Rosemont's Chicago Wolves. The Wolves, Rochester Americans, Manitoba Moose, Hamilton Bulldogs, and Bridgeport Sound Tigers each saw attendance figures increase over ten percent from 2003 to 2004 in the AHL, with the Moose average attendance soaring 24.09 percent from the previous year. In the ECHL, the Gwinnett Gladiators, San Diego Gulls, Bakersfield Condors, and Charlotte Checkers also saw similar gains, with the Atlanta Thrashers-affiliated Gladiators receiving a gain of over 20 percent in attendance from the previous year.

However, the lockout negatively affected many minor-league players, where the influx of NHL players forced many to play in lower-level leagues for less money or out of jobs altogether.

In addition, other minor hockey leagues benefited from the lack of competition from the major professional league. The Ontario Hockey League was a particular beneficiary, with teams such as the London Knights and Saginaw Spirit garnering considerable attention. The lack of the Stanley Cup playoffs also created increased interest in the 2005 Memorial Cup tournament with record TV ratings. Governor General of Canada Adrienne Clarkson mused publicly about the possibility of awarding the Stanley Cup to the best women's hockey team that year, but this idea was so unpopular that instead the Clarkson Cup was created. The 2005 Allan Cup in Lloydminster also attracted elevated national media interest.

In the Western Hockey League, the Calgary Hitmen were the most watched team in North America, averaging 10,062 fans per game. Their season total of 362,227 shattered the WHL and CHL records and represented a 33% increase over 2003–04. The Vancouver Giants also experienced a massive increase, finishing second in the WHL with 302,403 fans going through the turnstiles.

==== International hockey ====
The lockout had a substantial effect on international tournaments run by the International Ice Hockey Federation. The most notable effect was observed in the 2005 World Junior Ice Hockey Championships in Grand Forks, North Dakota, and Thief River Falls, Minnesota. With the NHL inactive, the top eligible U-20 players were not playing in that league and thus were available to their countries for the tournament. The country that benefitted most as a result was Canada. The Canadians not only ended a seven-year gold medal drought at this competition, they outscored their opponents 41–7 and defeated Russia 6–1 in the final game. Many analysts believe that the Canadian team was the most dominating ever in this tournament, aided in no small part by players such as Patrice Bergeron who could have expected to have commitments in the NHL.

At the time that the 2004–05 season was canceled, it was not immediately clear how the lockout would affect the 2005 World Ice Hockey Championships. Normally, NHL players from teams that failed to qualify for the Stanley Cup playoffs participate in this tournament. Since no playoffs were being held, theoretically all NHL players could participate. In reality, however, many NHL players declined to participate, and national teams were naturally reluctant to select players who lacked game conditioning. For all of the teams (including the North American ones), the bulk of the national teams' rosters consisted of players who were playing in Europe.

=== Effects outside hockey ===
Canadian sports fans also turned to the Canadian Football League, and the CFL recorded significant increases in attendance and television ratings during the final weeks of the 2004 CFL season compared to 2003, ultimately setting a new record for total playoff attendance. The league was able to hold onto at least some of these gains in 2005. The National Lacrosse League also saw a modest boost in attendance. Also in the United States, the National Basketball Association (NBA) also saw some big gains in attendance in markets which have both NHL and NBA teams; this is in part because the NHL and NBA season run in a similar time frame within the year and often play in the same venue. The National Football League (NFL) and Major League Baseball (MLB) also saw some minor gains in attendance in 2004–05. Major League Soccer (MLS) began to become profitable in 2004, which many believed to have been caused by the NHL lockout. To date, the MLS has operated with profit since 2004.

The Philips Arena requested the Southeastern Conference to move the SEC Women's Basketball Tournament out of their venue because of logistics, because the 55th NHL All-Star Game was scheduled for late January, while the SEC tournament was scheduled five weeks later. The resulting move led to the BI-LO Center, an ECHL arena 140 miles to the east in Greenville, South Carolina, hosting the tournament, drawing the ire of the NAACP, who wanted the SEC to ban the venue from hosting tournaments because of its location. Philips Arena was granted the NHL All-Star Game in 2008 as compensation.
