= Paul Kelly (lawyer) =

American lawyer

Paul V. Kelly (born ca. 1955) is a prominent Massachusetts-based American lawyer, who served as the fourth executive director of the NHL Players' Association from October 24, 2007, to August 31, 2009, and an executive director of College Hockey, Inc. Kelly is a partner in the Boston office of Jackson Lewis P.C. and is chair of the White Collar & Government Enforcement practice group and co-chair of the Collegiate & Professional Sports Industry practice group.

== Career ==
Kelly founded the Boston-based law firm Kelly, Libby and Hoopes.

Kelly was the assistant United States attorney during the trial and investigation of then-NHLPA head Alan Eagleson over corruption and embezzlement. Eagleson eventually pleaded guilty to fraud in Boston and was imprisoned in Toronto.

In 2000, Kelly represented Marty McSorley during the latter's trial in Vancouver for on-ice assault with a hockey stick.

== NHLPA director ==
Kelly was appointed as executive director of the NHLPA, replacing Ted Saskin who had been ousted for secretly monitoring player e-mail accounts.

Kelly was strongly in favour of adding an NHL team in Canada.

On August 31, 2009, Kelly was unexpectedly fired as head of the National Hockey league Players' Association following several hours of meetings. Russ Conway, the former Lawrence Eagle Tribune NHL and Boston Bruins sportswriter who had helped to expose Alan Eagleson's corrupt practices, described Kelly as the first "true, clean" leader the NHLPA ever had, and said "this is a very sad day for hockey. Unfortunately, the union continues to drink the Kool-Aid."

Some have speculated that Kelly was forced out in a power struggle. Ron Pink, the advisory board head, who had also applied for Kelly's position in 2007, and an ombudsman, Buzz Hargrove were also instrumental in the decision to dismiss Kelly.

Hargrove, Pink, Ian Penny, Ian Pulver and Eric Lindros were said to represent the "old guard of the NHLPA", one that was confrontational and focused on driving up player salaries, rather than the overall financial well-being of the league, and believed that the union conceded too much in negotiations during the 2004-05 lockout. Kelly was not involved with the NHLPA when the deal was negotiated; nonetheless he stated publicly that he did not want to see another work stoppage when the agreement expired on September 15, 2011.

Penny was named the interim director later that day. Donald Fehr became the permanent executive director on August 26, 2010.

== College Hockey, Inc. ==
In November 2009, Kelly was hired as executive director of College Hockey, Inc., an organization set up by the commissioners of the six men's Division I college ice hockey conferences to promote college ice hockey as an option for potential recruits. The organization also advises colleges looking into the possibility of adding NCAA Division I ice hockey.

== Jackson Lewis P.C. ==
Kelly has been a practicing trial lawyer for over 30 years, with extensive experience in white collar criminal defense, internal investigations, complex civil litigation and crisis management. He is chair of the firm's White Collar & Government Enforcement practice group. A former sports industry executive, he is also co-chair of the firm's Collegiate & Professional Sports Industry practice group.

Preceded by Ted Saskin	NHLPA Executive Director; 2007–2009	Succeeded by Ian Penny (interim)
