= Luxury tax (sports) =

Surcharge put on the aggregate payroll of a sports team

A luxury tax in professional sports is a surcharge put on the aggregate payroll of a team to the extent to which it exceeds a predetermined guideline level set by the league. The ostensible purpose of this "tax" is to prevent teams in major markets with high incomes from signing almost all of the more talented players and hence destroying the competitive balance necessary for a sport to maintain fan interest. The money derived from the "tax" is either divided among the teams that play in the smaller markets, presumably to allow them to have more revenue to devote toward the contracts of high-quality players, or in the case of Major League Baseball, used by the league for other pre-defined purposes.

In North America, Major League Baseball has implemented the luxury tax system. The National Basketball Association also has a luxury tax provision; its utility is somewhat limited by the fact that the league also has a salary cap provision. The "hard" salary cap of the National Football League and the National Hockey League has prevented any need for a luxury tax arrangement.

== Methods for limiting payroll ==
In the Big 4 North American sports leagues (Major League Baseball (MLB), National Basketball Association (NBA), National Football League (NFL), and National Hockey League (NHL)), there are three different methods employed to limit individual teams payroll: hard salary cap, soft salary cap with luxury tax, and luxury tax.

=== Hard salary cap ===
A hard salary cap is where the league sets a maximum amount of money allowed for player salaries, and no team can exceed that limit.

=== Soft salary cap ===
A soft salary cap has a set limit to player salaries, but there are several major exceptions that allow teams to exceed the salary cap. For example, in the case of the NBA, teams can exceed the salary cap when keeping players that are already on the team.

=== Luxury tax ===
A luxury tax system does not have a limit to how much money can be spent on player salaries. However, there is a tax levied on money spent above a threshold set by the Collective Bargaining Agreement (CBA) between the players union and the owners. For every dollar a team spends above the tax threshold, they must also pay some fraction to the league. This system is used to discourage teams from greatly exceeding the tax threshold, with the goal of ensuring parity between large and small market teams.

== Luxury tax rules by league ==
Major League Baseball
Luxury tax
National Basketball Association
Soft salary cap + luxury tax
National Football League
Hard salary cap
National Hockey League
Hard salary cap
Major League Soccer
Hard salary cap + Designated Player Rule exception (making it effectively a soft cap)
Major League Rugby
Hard salary cap
Major League Lacrosse
Hard salary cap
National Lacrosse League
Soft salary cap

=== Major League Baseball (MLB) ===
As explained by FanGraphs: "Technically called the 'Competitive Balance Tax', the luxury tax is the punishment that large market teams get for spending too much money. While MLB does not have a set salary cap, the luxury tax charges teams with high payrolls a considerable amount of money, giving teams ample reason to want to keep their payrolls below that level." The threshold level for the luxury tax was $189 million in 2014 (up from $178 M for 2011–2013) and remained at $189 M through 2016. From 2012 through 2016, teams who exceed the threshold for the first time must pay 17.5% of the amount they are over, 30% for the second consecutive year over, 40% for the third consecutive year over, and 50% for four or more consecutive years over the cap.

Only eight teams have ever exceeded the luxury tax threshold as of 2018: the San Francisco Giants, the Boston Red Sox, the Los Angeles Angels, the Detroit Tigers, the Los Angeles Dodgers, the New York Yankees, the Chicago Cubs for the first time in 2016 and the Washington Nationals for the first time in 2018. Only the Red Sox, Tigers, Dodgers, Giants, and Yankees have exceeded it more than once. The Dodgers have exceeded the threshold four times, the Red Sox six times, and the Yankees fifteen times, every year between 2003 and 2017. In aggregate, the Yankees have paid out some $325 M, 73.78% of the total fines assessed since the luxury tax began.

In 2016 a record six teams were issued the luxury tax by MLB: the Dodgers ($31.8 M), Yankees ($27.4 M), Red Sox ($4.5 M), Tigers ($4 M), Giants ($3.4 M) and Cubs ($2.96 M). In 2017 the same six teams from 2016 were issued the tax. Against the $195 M threshold plus $13 M for player benefits, payrolls for the Dodgers ($244 M), Yankees ($209.3 M), Red Sox ($187.9 M), Tigers ($190.4 M), Giants ($186.4 M) and Cubs ($199.5 M) were in excess. This was the 15th straight year the Yankees paid the luxury tax. In 2018, only the Red Sox ($9.4 M) and Nationals ($1.2 M) passed the tax threshold. Several teams came just under the $197 M threshold: the Giants ($196.66 M), Cubs ($183.9 M), Houston Astros ($182.4 M), Dodgers ($181.99 M) and Yankees ($178.8 M).

The luxury tax is separate from revenue sharing, which is a system to balance out the income distribution between large and small market teams by dividing money from merchandise sales and media contracts. As is the case in the NBA, the money generated from the tax is not distributed to the rest of the league, but is instead used for other purposes. The first $2,375,400 and 50% of the remaining total are used to fund player benefits, 25% goes to the Industry Growth Fund, and the remaining 25% is used to defray teams' funding obligations from player benefits.

Luxury tax paid per year by team (in $ millions)
Team	2003	2004	2005	2006	2007	2008	2009	2010	2011	2012	2013	2014	2015	2016	2017	2018	2019	2020	2021	Total
Tax threshold	117	120.5	128	136.5	148	155	162	170	178	178	178	189	189	189	195	197	206	208	210	-
Yankees	11.80	25.96	34.05	26.01	23.88	26.86	25.69	18.03	13.90	18.92	28.11	18.33	26.1	27.4	-	-	-	-	-	325.04
Dodgers	-	-	-	-	-	-	-	-	-	-	11.42	26.62	43.6	31.8	-	-	-	-	-	113.44
Red Sox	-	3.15	4.15	0.50	6.06	-	-	1.49	3.43	-	-	-	1.8	4.5	-	9.4	-	-	-	34.48
Tigers	-	-	-	-	-	1.31	-	-	-	-	-	-	-	4	-	-	-	-	-	5.31
Giants	-	-	-	-	-	-	-	-	-	-	-	-	1.3	3.4	-	-	-	-	-	4.7
Angels	-	0.93	-	-	-	-	-	-	-	-	-	-	-	-	-	-	-	-	-	0.93
Cubs	-	-	-	-	-	-	-	-	-	-	-	-	-	2.96	-	-	-	-	-	2.96
Nationals	-	-	-	-	-	-	-	-	-	-	-	-	-	-	-	1.2	-	-	-	1.2

=== National Basketball Association (NBA) ===
The NBA utilizes a soft salary cap, meaning there is a salary cap but there are a variety of exceptions that allow teams to exceed that cap. For example, teams can re-sign players already on the team to an amount up to the maximum salary allowed by the league for up to five years regardless of where their payroll is relative to the cap. This provision is known as the "Larry Bird" exception, named after the former Boston Celtics player who was retained by that team until his retirement under the provisions of this rule. The result is that the majority of teams are over the cap at any given time.

In addition to the soft cap, the NBA utilizes a luxury tax system that is applied if the team payroll exceeds a separate threshold higher than the salary cap. These teams pay a penalty for each dollar their team salary exceeds the tax level. From 2002 to 2013, if a team exceeded the luxury tax threshold, they must pay one dollar to the league for every dollar that they are over the limit. For the 2013–14 season and onward, teams paid an incremental rate based on their team salary. They also have to pay a repeat offender rate, which is an additional dollar for every dollar over. For 2014–15 teams pay the repeater rate if they also were taxpayers in all of the previous three seasons. For 2015-16 and all subsequent seasons, teams pay the repeater rate if they were taxpayers in at least three of the four previous seasons. The table of rates is shown below.

==== Current tax levels ====
Amount over tax threshold	Standard tax per excess dollar	Repeat offender tax per excess dollar
$4,999,999 or less	$1.50	$2.50
$5 million to $9,999,999	$1.75	$2.75
$10 million to $14,999,999	$2.50	$3.50
$15 million to $19,999,999	$3.25	$4.25
Over $20 million	$3.75 + $0.50 per $5 million	$4.75 + $0.50 per $5 million

The resulting total is then distributed to the remaining teams that are under the tax threshold.

There was no luxury tax implemented in the 2004–2005 season due to insufficient basketball-related income.

Luxury tax paid per year by team (in millions of $) (NBA Champ)
Team	2002–03	2003–04	2004–05	2005–06	2006–07	2007–08	2008–09	2009–10	2010–11	2011–12	2012–13	2013–14	2014–15	2015-16	Total Paid
Luxury Tax Threshold	52.88	54.56	N/A	61.7	65.42	67.86	71.15	69.92	70.31	70.31	70.31	71.75	76.83	84.74	N/A
Knicks	24.37	39.87	-	37.25	45.14	19.72	23.74	5.20	-	-	9.96	36.35	6.95	-	248.54
Mavericks	19.5	25.03	-	17.33	7.20	19.61	23.61	17.58	18.92	2.74	-	-	-	-	150.53
Nets	5.73	9.39	-	-	-	-	-	-	-	-	12.88	90.57	19.78	-	138.55
Lakers	9.75	6.44	-	-	-	5.13	7.19	21.43	19.92	12.56	29.26	8.96	-	-	122.64
Trail Blazers	51.97	28.85	-	-	-	-	5.899	-	-	-	-	-	-	-	89.05
Heat	5.18	-	-	-	-	8.32	-	3.04	-	6.13	13.35	14.43	-	-	50.44
Cavaliers	-	-	-	-	-	14.01	13.71	15.41	-	-	-	-	6.96	54	104.09
Celtics	-	1.60	-	-	-	8.22	8.29	14.93	5.69	7.37	1.18	-	-	-	47.28
Magic	-	-	-	7.76	-	-	-	11.05	20.18	-	-	-	-	-	38.95
Kings	17.38	13.14	-	-	-	-	-	-	-	-	-	-	-	-	30.52
Timberwolves	6.03	17.63	-	-	1.00	-	-	-	-	-	-	-	-	-	24.66
Nuggets	-	-	-	-	2.02	13.57	-	5.56	-	-	-	-	-	-	21.16
Sixers	12.76	5.10	-	-	-	-	-	-	-	-	-	-	-	-	17.86
Suns	1.89	-	-	-	-	3.87	4.92	4.96	-	-	-	-	-	-	15.63
Spurs	0.19	-	-	0.90	0.20	-	-	8.81	-	2.52	-	-	-	4.9	17.5
Grizzlies	7.55	-	-	3.74	-	-	-	-	-	-	-	-	-	-	11.30
Pacers	0.89	3.32	-	4.67	-	-	-	-	-	-	-	-	-	-	8.89
Jazz	-	-	-	-	-	-	-	3.11	5.00	-	-	-	-	-	8.10
Raptors	2.68	4.09	-	-	-	-	-	-	-	-	-	-	-	-	6.77
Clippers	-	-	-	-	-	-	-	-	-	-	-	1.33	4.80	19.9	26.03
Bucks	4.73	-	-	-	-	-	-	-	-	-	-	-	-	-	4.73
Hawks	3.72	-	-	-	-	-	-	-	-	0.67	-	-	-	-	4.38
Bulls	-	-	-	-	-	-	-	-	-	-	3.93	-	-	4.2	8.13
Thunder	-	-	-	-	-	-	-	-	-	-	-	-	2.79	14.5	17.29
Rockets	-	-	-	-	-	-	-	-	0.76	-	-	-	-	4.5	5.26
Pistons	-	0.76	-	-	-	-	-	-	-	-	-	-	-	-	0.76
Warriors	-	-	-	-	-	-	-	-	-	-	-	-	-	14.8	14.8
Hornets	-	-	-	-	-	-	-	-	-	-	-	-	-	-	0
Pelicans	-	-	-	-	-	-	-	-	-	-	-	-	-	-	0
Wizards	-	-	-	-	-	-	-	-	-	-	-	-	-	-	0

=== Canadian Football League ===
The Canadian Football League has a luxury tax. Penalties for teams that breach the salary cap regulations are:

Amount involved in breach	Penalty for each $1	Draft picks forfeited
First $100,000	$1	None
$100,000 to $300,000	$2	First Round
More than $300,000	$3	First and Second Round

=== Other leagues ===
The National Football League (NFL) and the National Hockey League (NHL) both have hard salary caps, making it unnecessary to utilize the luxury tax.

Several other leagues in the United States and abroad use salary caps, but the luxury tax is uncommon.
