= Ted Saskin =

Canadian sports executive

Theodore Saskin (born 1959) is a Canadian lawyer who served as the third executive director of the NHL Players Association from 2005 to 2007. He assumed the title after Bob Goodenow resigned on July 28, 2005, but was unanimously fired by the NHLPA on May 10, 2007, after a union-commissioned report concluded Saskin had quarterbacked a campaign to hack into player email accounts.

== Early life and career ==
Saskin was born in 1959 and grew up in the Montreal borough of Ville Saint-Laurent. He earned a Certificat d'Études Politiques (CEP) from Instituts d'études politiques in 1979, a Bachelor of Arts degree from Brandeis University in 1980, and was admitted to the Ontario bar in 1985 after graduating from the University of Toronto Law School in 1983. He has practiced law in Toronto since 1985 and worked in commercial litigation in his earlier career.

== NHLPA career ==
Before becoming executive director, Saskin had previously served as NHLPA Senior Director of Business Affairs and Licensing since 1992, as one of Goodenow's new deputies when the latter assumed the role of executive director after the forced resignation of Alan Eagleson.

Saskin was credited with taking a more conciliatory approach to collective bargaining agreement negotiations, compared to the hard-line stance of Goodenow, which ended the 2004–05 NHL lockout. Saskin was widely seen as the heir apparent to Goodenow and initially touted as a successor due to his knowledge of the CBA, so he became NHLPA Executive Director in 2005 after Goodenow was forced to step down.

However, Saskin's hiring came under scrutiny from some players who felt that he was improperly elected and misrepresented salary figures during negotiations with players union president Trevor Linden, a forward with the Vancouver Canucks. On October 2, 2006, a group of NHL players, led by Chris Chelios filed a lawsuit in US Federal Court to remove Saskin and also millions of dollars in damages and punitive damages. Eventually the lawsuit was dismissed by a judge who ruled that because the NHLPA is based in Toronto, Ontario, that is the appropriate venue for the case.

In 2007, Saskin and other union executives came under fire for allegedly inappropriately accessing the private email accounts of players and agents who have challenged his hiring.

On March 11, 2007, Saskin was placed on a paid leave of absence from his position as NHLPA executive director, before being let go on May 10. Saskin, who was in the second year of a five-year contract reportedly worth $10 million US, reportedly received nearly $750,000 US in accrued vacation pay and union shares.

== Personal life ==
Saskin's wife is a family doctor. They have four children, including triplets.

| Preceded by Bob Goodenow | NHLPA Executive Director; 2005–2007 | Succeeded by Paul Kelly |
