= 1992–93 NHL season =

National Hockey League season

- Commemorative patch celebrating the 100th anniversary of the Stanley Cup
- League: National Hockey League
- Sport: Ice hockey
- Duration: October 6, 1992 – June 9, 1993
- Games: 84
- Teams: 24
- TV partner(s): CBC, TSN, SRC (Canada); ESPN, ABC, NBC (Note: NBC only televised the All-Star Game.) (United States)

Draft
- Top draft pick: Roman Hamrlik
- Picked by: Tampa Bay Lightning

Regular season
- Presidents' Trophy: Pittsburgh Penguins
- Season MVP: Mario Lemieux (Penguins)
- Top scorer: Mario Lemieux (Penguins)

Playoffs
- Playoffs MVP: Patrick Roy (Canadiens)

Stanley Cup
- Champions: Montreal Canadiens
- Runners-up: Los Angeles Kings

NHL seasons
- 1991–92 1993–94

The 1992–93 NHL season was the 76th regular season of the National Hockey League. Each player wore a patch on their jersey throughout the season to commemorate the 100th anniversary of the Stanley Cup. The league expanded to 24 teams with the addition of the Ottawa Senators and the Tampa Bay Lightning. Under the new labour agreement signed following the 1992 NHL strike, each team began playing 84 games per season, including two home games at neutral sites.

The Montreal Canadiens won their league-leading 24th Cup by defeating the Los Angeles Kings four games to one. This remains the last time that a Canadian team has won the Stanley Cup.

It proved, at the time, to be the highest-scoring regular season in NHL history, as a total of 7,311 goals were scored over 1,008 games for an average of 7.25 per game. Twenty of the twenty-four teams scored three goals or more per game, and only two teams, the Toronto Maple Leafs and the Chicago Blackhawks, allowed fewer than three goals per game. Only 68 shutouts were recorded during the regular season. A record twenty-one players reached the 100-point plateau, while a record fourteen players reached the 50-goal plateau—both records still stand through the 2024–25 season.

Through the halfway point in this season Mario Lemieux was in the process of putting together one of the most historic seasons in NHL history; being on pace to challenge both the 92 goal and 215 point records of Wayne Gretzky when he was diagnosed with Hodgkins Lymphoma. Lemieux still went on to win the Art Ross and Hart Trophies, despite every other player in the top five in league scoring playing a complete 84 game season to his 60 games. He also finished with the third highest point per game average in a season in league history.

== League business ==
=== Expansion ===
This season saw two new clubs join the league: the Ottawa Senators and the Tampa Bay Lightning. The Senators were the second Ottawa-based NHL franchise (see Ottawa Senators (original)) and brought professional hockey back to Canada's capital, while the Tampa Bay franchise (headed by Hockey Hall of Fame brothers Phil and Tony Esposito) strengthened the NHL's presence in the American Sun Belt, which had first started with the birth of the Los Angeles Kings in 1967. The 1992 NHL expansion draft was held on June 18 to fill the rosters of the Senators and the Lightning.

This was the final season of the Wales and Campbell Conferences, and the Adams, Patrick, Norris, and Smythe divisions. Both the conferences and the divisions would be renamed to reflect geography rather than the league's history for the following season. This was also the last year (until the 2013 realignment) in which the playoff structure bracketed and seeded teams by division; they would be bracketed and seeded by conference (as in the NBA) for 1993–94.

=== Entry draft ===
The 1992 NHL entry draft was held on June 20 at the Montreal Forum in Montreal, Quebec. Roman Hamrlik was selected first overall by the Tampa Bay Lightning.

=== Bettman named first NHL Commissioner ===
In the summer of 1992, NHL owners replaced NHL President John Ziegler with Gil Stein on an interim basis. Ziegler had held the position for 15 years, but owners became unhappy following the 1992 NHL strike. On February 1, 1993, Gary Bettman became the first NHL Commissioner, with the office originally created as senior to Stein's position as NHL President. Working towards labour peace was among the tasks handed to Bettman when the owners hired him. After Stein's tenure expired on July 1, 1993, the President's office was merged into the Commissioner's.

=== Centennial celebration of the Stanley Cup ===
All teams wore a commemorative patch this year celebrating the 100th anniversary of the Stanley Cup.

=== Rule changes ===
- Instigating a fight results in a game misconduct penalty.
- Substitutions disallowed for coincidental minor penalties when teams are at full strength, reversing a rule passed for the 1985–86 season.
- Minor penalty for diving introduced.

== Arena changes ==
- The expansion Ottawa Senators moved into Ottawa Civic Centre.
- The expansion Tampa Bay Lightning moved into Expo Hall in East Lake-Orient Park, Florida.

== Regular season ==
=== Neutral site games ===
As a part of the 1992 strike settlement, the regular season was expanded from 80 to 84 games per team. The NHL and Bruce McNall's Multivision Marketing and Public Relations Co. organized the additional 24 regular season games in 15 cities that did not have a franchise, providing as a litmus test for future expansion. Four of the cities chosen – Phoenix, Atlanta, Dallas and Miami – were eventually the sites of expansion or relocations, and although neither Cleveland nor Cincinnati received NHL franchises, there would be one placed in Columbus, located halfway between the two cities. Two arenas that hosted neutral-site games had hosted NHL teams before: Atlanta's The Omni (Atlanta Flames) and Cleveland's Richfield Coliseum (Cleveland Barons).

| Date | Winning team | Score | Losing team | Score | OT | City | State/Province | Arena | Attendance | Reference |
|---|---|---|---|---|---|---|---|---|---|---|
| October 13, 1992 | Calgary | 4 | Minnesota | 3 | | Saskatoon | SK | SaskPlace | 8,783 | |
| October 20, 1992 | Toronto | 5 | Ottawa | 3 | | Hamilton | ON | Copps Coliseum | 7,186 | |
| November 3, 1992 | Washington | 4 | Chicago | 1 | | Indianapolis | IN | Market Square Arena | 8,792 | |
| November 17, 1992 | Quebec | 3 | Toronto | 1 | | Hamilton | ON | Copps Coliseum | 17,026* | |
| November 18, 1992 | New Jersey | 3 | Buffalo | 2 | | Hamilton | ON | Copps Coliseum | 6,972 | |
| December 1, 1992 | Los Angeles | 6 | Chicago | 3 | | Milwaukee | WI | Bradley Center | 16,292 | |
| December 8, 1992 | Montreal | 5 | Los Angeles | 5 | (OT) | Phoenix | AZ | Arizona Veterans Memorial Coliseum | 12,276 | |
| December 9, 1992 | NY Rangers | 6 | Tampa Bay | 5 | | Miami | FL | Miami Arena | 12,842 | |
| December 13, 1992 | NY Islanders | 4 | Edmonton | 1 | | Oklahoma City | OK | Myriad Convention Center | 11,110 | |
| December 15, 1992 | NY Islanders | 4 | St. Louis | 3 | (OT) | Dallas | TX | Reunion Arena | 11,251 | |
| January 4, 1993 | Montréal | 4 | San Jose | 1 | | Sacramento | CA | ARCO Arena | 11,814 | |
| January 18, 1993 | Winnipeg | 8 | Hartford | 7 | | Saskatoon | SK | SaskPlace | 7,756 | |
| February 8, 1993 | Pittsburgh | 4 | Boston | 0 | | Atlanta | GA | The Omni | 12,572 | |
| February 8, 1993 | St. Louis | 3 | Hartford | 1 | | Peoria | IL | Carver Arena | 9,013 | |
| February 16, 1993 | Calgary | 4 | Philadelphia | 4 | (OT) | Cincinnati | OH | Riverfront Coliseum | 7,973 | |
| February 20, 1993 | Quebec | 5 | Tampa Bay | 2 | | Halifax | NS | Halifax Metro Centre | 9,584 | |
| February 22, 1993 | Detroit | 5 | Philadelphia | 5 | (OT) | Cleveland | OH | Richfield Coliseum | 13,382 | |
| February 22, 1993 | NY Rangers | 4 | San Jose | 0 | | Sacramento | CA | ARCO Arena | 13,633 | |
| February 23, 1993 | Winnipeg | 8 | Ottawa | 2 | | Saskatoon | SK | SaskPlace | 7,245 | |
| March 1, 1993 | Vancouver | 5 | Buffalo | 2 | | Hamilton | ON | Copps Coliseum | 17,098* | |
| March 11, 1993 | Minnesota | 4 | Vancouver | 3 | | Saskatoon | SK | SaskPlace | 12,006* | |
| March 16, 1993 | Washington | 4 | Detroit | 2 | | Milwaukee | WI | Bradley Center | 9,836 | |
| March 16, 1993 | Boston | 3 | New Jersey | 1 | | Providence | RI | Providence Civic Center | 10,864 | |
| March 21, 1993 | Pittsburgh | 6 | Edmonton | 4 | | Cleveland | OH | Richfield Coliseum | 18,782* | |

The Hartford-St. Louis game was originally scheduled to be played on December 29, 1992, in Birmingham, Alabama.

=== All-Star Game ===
The All-Star Game was held on February 6, 1993, at the Montreal Forum, the home of the Montreal Canadiens.

=== Highlights ===
Teemu Selanne of the Winnipeg Jets shattered the rookie scoring record by scoring 76 goals and 56 assists for 132 points this season. He was named the winner of the Calder Memorial Trophy as the NHL rookie of the year, and his goals and points marks remain the NHL rookie records as of 2026.

The New York Rangers missed the playoffs. This marked the first time since the President's Trophy had been introduced that the previous season's top team missed the next year's playoffs.

For the first time in his NHL career, Wayne Gretzky did not finish in the top three in scoring. A back injury limited Gretzky to 45 games in which he scored 65 points.

The Pittsburgh Penguins set a new NHL record, winning 17 consecutive games. The streak ending with the regular season.

=== Final standings ===
Note: W = Wins, L = Losses, T = Ties, GF = Goals for, GA = Goals against, Pts = Points

==== Prince of Wales Conference ====
Adams Division
| | GP | W | L | T | Pts | GF | GA |
|---|---|---|---|---|---|---|---|
| Boston Bruins | 84 | 51 | 26 | 7 | 109 | 332 | 268 |
| Quebec Nordiques | 84 | 47 | 27 | 10 | 104 | 351 | 300 |
| Montreal Canadiens | 84 | 48 | 30 | 6 | 102 | 326 | 280 |
| Buffalo Sabres | 84 | 38 | 36 | 10 | 86 | 335 | 297 |
| Hartford Whalers | 84 | 26 | 52 | 6 | 58 | 284 | 369 |
| Ottawa Senators | 84 | 10 | 70 | 4 | 24 | 202 | 395 |

Patrick Division
| | GP | W | L | T | Pts | GF | GA |
|---|---|---|---|---|---|---|---|
| Pittsburgh Penguins | 84 | 56 | 21 | 7 | 119 | 367 | 268 |
| Washington Capitals | 84 | 43 | 34 | 7 | 93 | 325 | 286 |
| New York Islanders | 84 | 40 | 37 | 7 | 87 | 335 | 297 |
| New Jersey Devils | 84 | 40 | 37 | 7 | 87 | 308 | 299 |
| Philadelphia Flyers | 84 | 36 | 37 | 11 | 83 | 319 | 319 |
| New York Rangers | 84 | 34 | 39 | 11 | 79 | 304 | 308 |

==== Clarence Campbell Conference ====
Norris Division
| | GP | W | L | T | Pts | GF | GA |
|---|---|---|---|---|---|---|---|
| Chicago Blackhawks | 84 | 47 | 25 | 12 | 106 | 279 | 230 |
| Detroit Red Wings | 84 | 47 | 28 | 9 | 103 | 369 | 280 |
| Toronto Maple Leafs | 84 | 44 | 29 | 11 | 99 | 288 | 241 |
| St. Louis Blues | 84 | 37 | 36 | 11 | 85 | 282 | 278 |
| Minnesota North Stars | 84 | 36 | 38 | 10 | 82 | 272 | 293 |
| Tampa Bay Lightning | 84 | 23 | 54 | 7 | 53 | 245 | 332 |

Smythe Division
| | GP | W | L | T | Pts | GF | GA |
|---|---|---|---|---|---|---|---|
| Vancouver Canucks | 84 | 46 | 29 | 9 | 101 | 346 | 278 |
| Calgary Flames | 84 | 43 | 30 | 11 | 97 | 322 | 282 |
| Los Angeles Kings | 84 | 39 | 35 | 10 | 88 | 338 | 340 |
| Winnipeg Jets | 84 | 40 | 37 | 7 | 87 | 322 | 320 |
| Edmonton Oilers | 84 | 26 | 50 | 8 | 60 | 242 | 337 |
| San Jose Sharks | 84 | 11 | 71 | 2 | 24 | 218 | 414 |

== Playoffs ==
=== Bracket ===
The top four teams in each division qualified for the playoffs. In each round, teams competed in a best-of-seven series (scores in the bracket indicate the number of games won in each best-of-seven series). In the division semifinals, the fourth seeded team in each division played against the division winner from their division. The other series matched the second and third place teams from the divisions. The two winning teams from each division's semifinals then met in the division finals. The two division winners of each conference then played in the conference finals. The two conference winners then advanced to the Stanley Cup Final.

Division semifinals | Division finals
A1 | Boston | 0
A4 | Buffalo | 4
A4 | Buffalo | 0
A3 | Montreal | 4
A2 | Quebec | 2
A3 | Montreal | 4
Prince of Wales Conference
P1 | Pittsburgh | 4
P4 | New Jersey | 1
P1 | Pittsburgh | 3
P3 | NY Islanders | 4
P2 | Washington | 2
P3 | NY Islanders | 4
N1 | Chicago | 0
N4 | St. Louis | 4
N4 | St. Louis | 3
N3 | Toronto | 4
N2 | Detroit | 3
N3 | Toronto | 4
Clarence Campbell Conference
S1 | Vancouver | 4
S4 | Winnipeg | 2
S1 | Vancouver | 2
S3 | Los Angeles | 4
S2 | Calgary | 2
S3 | Los Angeles | 4

Conference finals
A3 | Montreal | 4
P3 | NY Islanders | 1
N3 | Toronto | 3
S3 | Los Angeles | 4

Stanley Cup Final
A3 | Montreal | 4
S3 | Los Angeles | 1

== NHL awards ==
1992–93 NHL awards
| Award | Recipient(s) | Runner(s)-up/Finalists |
|---|---|---|
| Presidents' Trophy (Best regular-season record) | Pittsburgh Penguins | Boston Bruins |
| Prince of Wales Trophy (Wales Conference playoff champion) | Montreal Canadiens | New York Islanders |
| Clarence S. Campbell Bowl (Campbell Conference playoff champion) | Los Angeles Kings | Toronto Maple Leafs |
| Alka-Seltzer Plus-Minus Award (Best plus-minus statistic) | Mario Lemieux (Pittsburgh Penguins) | Larry Murphy (Pittsburgh Penguins) |
| Art Ross Trophy (Player with most points) | Mario Lemieux (Pittsburgh Penguins) | Pat LaFontaine (Buffalo Sabres) |
| Bill Masterton Memorial Trophy (Perseverance, Sportsmanship, and Dedication) | Mario Lemieux (Pittsburgh Penguins) | N/A |
| Calder Memorial Trophy (Best first-year player) | Teemu Selanne (Winnipeg Jets) | Joe Juneau (Boston Bruins); Felix Potvin (Toronto Maple Leafs) |
| Conn Smythe Trophy (Most valuable player, playoffs) | Patrick Roy (Montreal Canadiens) | N/A |
| Frank J. Selke Trophy (Best defensive forward) | Doug Gilmour (Toronto Maple Leafs) | Joel Otto (Calgary Flames); Dave Poulin (Boston Bruins) |
| Hart Memorial Trophy (Most valuable player, regular season) | Mario Lemieux (Pittsburgh Penguins) | Doug Gilmour (Toronto Maple Leafs); Pat LaFontaine (Buffalo Sabres) |
| Jack Adams Award (Best coach) | Pat Burns (Toronto Maple Leafs) | Pierre Page (Quebec Nordiques); Brian Sutter (Boston Bruins) |
| James Norris Memorial Trophy (Best defenceman) | Chris Chelios (Chicago Blackhawks) | Ray Bourque (Boston Bruins); Larry Murphy (Pittsburgh Penguins) |
| King Clancy Memorial Trophy (Leadership and humanitarian contribution) | Dave Poulin (Boston Bruins) | N/A |
| Lady Byng Memorial Trophy (Sportsmanship and excellence) | Pierre Turgeon (New York Islanders) | Pat LaFontaine (Buffalo Sabres); Adam Oates (Boston Bruins) |
| Lester B. Pearson Award (Outstanding player) | Mario Lemieux (Pittsburgh Penguins) | N/A |
| Vezina Trophy (Best goaltender) | Ed Belfour (Chicago Blackhawks) | Tom Barrasso (Pittsburgh Penguins); Curtis Joseph (St. Louis Blues) |
| William M. Jennings Trophy (Goaltender(s) of team with fewest goals against) | Ed Belfour (Chicago Blackhawks) | Grant Fuhr and Felix Potvin (Toronto Maple Leafs) |

== Player statistics ==
During the 1992-93 season, a record twenty-one players reached the 100-point plateau, while a record fourteen players reached the 50-goal plateau. As of the 2023-24 season, both records still continue stand after three decades. This was also the last season that an NHL player scored 70 or more goals in a single regular season.

=== Scoring leaders ===
| Player | Team | GP | G | A | Pts | +/– | PIM |
|---|---|---|---|---|---|---|---|
| Mario Lemieux | Pittsburgh | 60 | 69 | 91 | 160 | +55 | 38 |
| Pat LaFontaine | Buffalo | 84 | 53 | 95 | 148 | +11 | 63 |
| Adam Oates | Boston | 84 | 45 | 97 | 142 | +15 | 32 |
| Steve Yzerman | Detroit | 84 | 58 | 79 | 137 | +33 | 44 |
| Teemu Selanne | Winnipeg | 84 | 76 | 56 | 132 | +8 | 45 |
| Pierre Turgeon | NY Islanders | 83 | 58 | 74 | 132 | -1 | 26 |
| Alexander Mogilny | Buffalo | 77 | 76 | 51 | 127 | +7 | 40 |
| Doug Gilmour | Toronto | 83 | 32 | 95 | 127 | +32 | 100 |
| Luc Robitaille | Los Angeles | 84 | 63 | 62 | 125 | +18 | 100 |
| Mark Recchi | Philadelphia | 84 | 53 | 70 | 123 | +1 | 95 |

=== Leading goaltenders ===
| Player | Team | GP | TOI | GA | SO | GAA | SV% |
|---|---|---|---|---|---|---|---|
| Felix Potvin | Toronto | 48 | 2781 | 116 | 2 | 2.50 | .910 |
| Ed Belfour | Chicago | 71 | 4106 | 177 | 7 | 2.59 | .906 |
| Tom Barrasso | Pittsburgh | 63 | 3702 | 186 | 4 | 3.01 | .901 |
| Curtis Joseph | St. Louis | 68 | 3890 | 196 | 1 | 3.02 | .911 |
| Kay Whitmore | Vancouver | 31 | 1817 | 94 | 1 | 3.10 | .890 |
| Dominik Hasek | Buffalo | 28 | 1429 | 75 | 0 | 3.15 | .896 |
| Andy Moog | Boston | 55 | 3194 | 168 | 3 | 3.16 | .876 |
| Jeff Reese | Calgary | 26 | 1311 | 70 | 1 | 3.20 | .872 |
| Patrick Roy | Montreal | 62 | 3595 | 192 | 2 | 3.20 | .894 |
| Daren Puppa | Buffalo/Toronto | 32 | 1785 | 96 | 2 | 3.23 | .898 |

=== All-Star teams ===
| Position | First Team | Second Team | Position | All-Rookie |
|---|---|---|---|---|
| G | Ed Belfour, Chicago Blackhawks | Tom Barrasso, Pittsburgh Penguins | G | Felix Potvin, Toronto Maple Leafs |
| D | Chris Chelios, Chicago Blackhawks | Larry Murphy, Pittsburgh Penguins | D | Vladimir Malakhov, New York Islanders |
| D | Ray Bourque, Boston Bruins | Al Iafrate, Washington Capitals | D | Scott Niedermayer, New Jersey Devils |
| C | Mario Lemieux, Pittsburgh Penguins | Pat LaFontaine, Buffalo Sabres | F | Eric Lindros, Philadelphia Flyers |
| RW | Teemu Selanne, Winnipeg Jets | Alexander Mogilny, Buffalo Sabres | F | Teemu Selanne, Winnipeg Jets |
| LW | Luc Robitaille, Los Angeles Kings | Kevin Stevens, Pittsburgh Penguins | F | Joe Juneau, Boston Bruins |

== Events and milestones ==
- Manon Rheaume became the first woman to play for a major sports league in North America as she tended goal for the Tampa Bay Lightning in an exhibition game on September 23, 1992, against the St. Louis Blues.
- The Ottawa Senators and Tampa Bay Lightning were two new teams to be added to the league, bringing the league to 24 teams, one-third of which were Canadian teams, as they comprised eight of the twenty-four teams. Both teams would win their opening games and briefly sit atop their respective Divisions, which led to Harry Neale jokingly proclaiming before the end of Ottawa's first win that both the Senators and Lightning would reach the Stanley Cup Final in May.
- October 1992: Gil Stein named NHL President.
- February 1993: Gary Bettman named NHL Commissioner.
- Record set for most 100-point scorers and most 50-goal scorers in one season.
- February 10, 1993: In a 13–1 drubbing of the San Jose Sharks, Calgary Flames goaltender Jeff Reese set NHL records for most points and most assists by a goaltender in one game, with three.
- The 1993 Stanley Cup playoffs marked the 100th anniversary of the Stanley Cup.
- Pittsburgh Penguins set the NHL record for longest win streak at 17 games. Conversely, the San Jose Sharks tied the NHL record for longest losing streak at 17 games.

=== Major transactions ===
- June 30, 1992: Eric Lindros traded from Quebec to Philadelphia for Peter Forsberg, Ron Hextall, Mike Ricci, Kerry Huffman, Steve Duchesne, "future considerations" (eventually became enforcer Chris Simon), two first-round draft picks and US$15 million. One of the draft picks was used by the Nordiques to select goaltender Jocelyn Thibault, the other was traded twice and ultimately used by the Washington Capitals to select Nolan Baumgartner.

=== Records broken/tied ===
==== Regular season ====
===== Team =====
- Most losses, one season: San Jose Sharks (71)
- Fewest ties, one season: San Jose Sharks (2)
- Most home losses, one season: San Jose Sharks (32)
- Most road losses, one season: Ottawa Senators (40)
- Fewest road wins, one season: Ottawa Senators (1)*
- Longest winning streak: Pittsburgh Penguins (17) (All time NHL record)
- Longest losing streak: San Jose Sharks (17)*
- Longest road losing streak: Ottawa Senators (38)
- Longest road winless streak: Ottawa Senators (38)
- Most 100-or-more point scorers, one season: Pittsburgh Penguins (4)*
- Fastest three goals from the start of period, one team: Calgary Flames (0:53, February 10, 1993)

===== Individual =====
- Most goals, including playoffs: Wayne Gretzky (875)
- Most 30-goal seasons: Mike Gartner (14)*
- Most consecutive 30-goal seasons: Mike Gartner (14)
- Most goals, one season, by a left winger: Luc Robitaille (63)
- Most goals, one season, by a rookie: Teemu Selanne (76)
- Most assists, one season, by a left winger: Joe Juneau (70)
- Most assists, one season, by a rookie: Joe Juneau (70)* (Note: Wayne Gretzky scored 86 assists in his first year, but he was not considered a rookie)
- Most points, one season, by a left winger: Luc Robitaille (125)
- Most points, one season, by a rookie: Teemu Selanne (132) (Note: Wayne Gretzky scored 137 points in his first year, but he was not considered a rookie)
- Most assists, one game, by a goaltender: Jeff Reese (3, February 10, 1993)
- Most games missed while winning Art Ross Trophy: Mario Lemieux (24)

==== Playoffs ====
===== Team =====
- Most overtime games, one playoff year: 28
- Most overtime wins, one playoff year: Montreal Canadiens (10)
- Most consecutive overtime wins, one playoff year: Montreal Canadiens (10)
- Most consecutive wins, one playoff year: Montreal Canadiens (11)*

===== Individual =====
- Most consecutive wins, one playoff year: Patrick Roy (11)*
- Most goals by a defenceman, one game: Eric Desjardins (3, June 3, 1993)*
- Most power-play goals, one game: Dino Ciccarelli (3, April 29, 1993)*
- Most shorthanded goals, one game: Tom Fitzgerald (2, May 8, 1993)*
- Most assists, one period: Adam Oates (3, April 24, 1993)*

* Equalled existing record

=== Debuts ===
The following is a list of players of note who played their first NHL game in 1992–93 (listed with their first team):

- Byron Dafoe, Washington Capitals
- Roman Hamrlik, Tampa Bay Lightning
- Darius Kasparaitis, New York Islanders
- Steve Konowalchuk, Washington Capitals
- Alexei Kovalev, New York Rangers
- Robert Lang, Los Angeles Kings
- Eric Lindros, Philadelphia Flyers
- Vladimir Malakhov, New York Islanders
- Michael Nylander, Hartford Whalers
- Sandis Ozolinsh, San Jose Sharks
- Teemu Selanne, Winnipeg Jets
- Bryan Smolinski, Boston Bruins
- Martin Straka, Pittsburgh Penguins
- Alexei Zhamnov, Winnipeg Jets
- Sergei Zubov, New York Rangers

=== Last games ===
The following is a list of players of note who played their last game in the NHL in 1992–93 (listed with their last team):

- Reggie Lemelin, Boston Bruins
- Brent Ashton, Calgary Flames
- John Ogrodnick, Detroit Red Wings
- Tim Kerr, Hartford Whalers
- Bobby Smith, Minnesota North Stars
- Brian Mullen, New York Islanders
- Brad Marsh, Ottawa Senators
- Laurie Boschman, Ottawa Senators
- Brian Hayward, San Jose Sharks
- Brian Lawton, San Jose Sharks
- Doug Wilson, San Jose Sharks
- Rick Wamsley, Toronto Maple Leafs
- Steve Kasper, Tampa Bay Lightning
- Ryan Walter, Vancouver Canucks
- Rod Langway, Washington Capitals
- Randy Carlyle, Winnipeg Jets

Four of the five remaining helmetless players in the league played their final games: Carlyle, Marsh, Langway, and Wilson. The only remaining helmetless player was Craig McTavish who retired following the 1996–97 season.

== Coaches ==
=== Prince of Wales Conference ===
| Team | Coach | Comments |
|---|---|---|
| Boston Bruins | Brian Sutter | |
| Buffalo Sabres | John Muckler | |
| Hartford Whalers | Paul Holmgren | |
| Montreal Canadiens | Jacques Demers | |
| New Jersey Devils | Herb Brooks | |
| New York Islanders | Al Arbour | |
| New York Rangers | Roger Neilson | Replaced on January 5 by Ron Smith |
| Ottawa Senators | Rick Bowness | |
| Philadelphia Flyers | Bill Dineen | |
| Pittsburgh Penguins | Scotty Bowman | |
| Quebec Nordiques | Pierre Page | |
| Washington Capitals | Terry Murray | |

=== Clarence Campbell Conference ===
| Team | Coach | Comments |
|---|---|---|
| Calgary Flames | Dave King | |
| Chicago Blackhawks | Darryl Sutter | |
| Detroit Red Wings | Bryan Murray | |
| Edmonton Oilers | Ted Green | |
| Los Angeles Kings | Barry Melrose | |
| Minnesota North Stars | Bob Gainey | |
| St. Louis Blues | Bob Plager | Replaced on October 30 by Bob Berry |
| San Jose Sharks | George Kingston | |
| Tampa Bay Lightning | Terry Crisp | |
| Toronto Maple Leafs | Pat Burns | |
| Vancouver Canucks | Pat Quinn | |
| Winnipeg Jets | John Paddock | |

== Broadcasting ==
=== Canada ===
This was the fifth season of the league's Canadian national broadcast rights deals with TSN and Hockey Night in Canada on CBC. Saturday night regular season games continued to air on CBC, while TSN televised selected weeknight games. Coverage of the Stanley Cup playoffs was primarily on CBC, with TSN airing first round all-U.S. series.

=== United States ===
ESPN signed an agreement for U.S. national broadcast rights, replacing SportsChannel America. However, SportsChannel America contended that its contract with the NHL gave them the right to match third-party offers for television rights for the 1992–93 season. Thus the network accused the NHL of violating a nonbinding clause, arguing that it had been deprived of its contractual right of first refusal for the 1992–93 season. Appellate Division of New York State Supreme Court justice Shirley Fingerwood would deny SportsChannel America's request for an injunction against the NHL. Upholding that opinion, the appellate court found the agreement on which SportsChannel based its argument to be "too imprecise and ambiguous" and ruled that SportsChannel failed to show irreparable harm.

ESPN's weekly regular season games were generally broadcast on Wednesdays and Fridays. ESPN also had Sunday games between the NFL and baseball seasons.

ESPN's deal did not include the All-Star Game; NBC instead televised it for the fourth consecutive season.

Through a brokered deal, sister broadcast network ABC televised five weekly playoff telecasts on Sunday afternoons starting on April 18 and ending on May 16. The first three weeks were regional coverage of various first and second round games, while the fourth and fifth games were nationally televised second round and Conference final contests, respectively. This marked the first time that playoff National Hockey League games were broadcast on American network television since 1975. ESPN then televised selected first and second round games, the rest of the Conference finals, and the Stanley Cup Final.

== See also ==
- List of Stanley Cup champions
- 1992 NHL entry draft
- 1992 NHL expansion draft
- 1992 NHL supplemental draft
- 1992–93 NHL transactions
- 44th National Hockey League All-Star Game
- National Hockey League All-Star Game
- NHL All-Rookie Team
- Lester Patrick Trophy
- 1992 in sports
- 1993 in sports

== Bibliography ==
- Diamond, Dan, ed. (2000). Total Hockey. Kingston, NY: Total Sports. ISBN 1-892129-85-X.
- Dinger, Ralph, ed. (2011). The National Hockey League Official Guide & Record Book 2012. Toronto, ON: Dan Diamond & Associates. ISBN 978-1-894801-22-5.
- Dryden, Steve, ed. (2000). Century of hockey. Toronto, ON: McClelland & Stewart Ltd. ISBN 0-7710-4179-9.
- Fischler, Stan; Fischler, Shirley; Hughes, Morgan; Romain, Joseph; Duplacey, James (2003). The Hockey Chronicle: Year-by-Year History of the National Hockey League. Lincolnwood, IL: Publications International Inc. ISBN 0-7853-9624-1.
