= 1992 NHL strike =

1992 Player's strike by North American ice hockey players

The 1992 NHL strike was the first strike action initiated by the National Hockey League Players' Association (NHLPA) against the National Hockey League's (NHL) owners. It was called on April 1, 1992, and lasted ten days. The settlement saw the players earn a large increase in their playoff bonuses, increased control over the licensing of their likenesses and changes to the free agency system. In addition, the season was expanded to 84 games and included provisions for each team to play two games per season in non-NHL cities. As a result of the strike, the owners removed John Ziegler as President, replacing him with Gil Stein. The strike fundamentally altered the relationship between the league and its players.

== Background ==
The NHLPA was formed in 1967, and led by Alan Eagleson, who served as executive-director. Eagleson remained in that position until December 1991, when he was forced to resign after the players became uneasy with the relationship he had with the league's owners. Three years later, in November 1994, the Law Society of Upper Canada charged Eagleson with numerous offences, accusing him of embezzlement, providing unauthorized loans using union funds to his friends and associates and of colluding with the NHL's owners. In 1996, he faced similar charges from the Royal Canadian Mounted Police and later the Federal Bureau of Investigation in the United States. In 1998, Eagleson pleaded guilty to the charges, earning him a C$1 million fine and eighteen-months in jail.

Eagleson was succeeded as NHLPA executive-director on January 1, 1992, by former player agent Bob Goodenow. He had served as deputy director of the NHLPA since 1990, and had spent his time instructing the players on the issues the union faced in its relations with the league. As executive-director, Goodenow was tasked with negotiating a new collective bargaining agreement, which had expired prior to the start of the 1991–92 NHL season. Goodenow met with NHL President John Ziegler as the two attempted to negotiate an agreement on a range of issues including how free agency worked, the arbitration process, playoff bonuses and pensions. The issue of how to share trading card revenue was considered to be one of the greatest stumbling blocks the two sides faced.

== Strike ==
The players called the first general strike in NHL history on April 1, 1992, after the union rejected the owners' last offer before their deadline by a vote of 560-to-4. By calling the strike so close to the end of the regular season, the players felt they had the advantage, as the majority of owners profits were realized in the playoffs. Playoff bonuses for players ranged from between US$3,000 for players on teams who lost in the first round, up to $25,000 for players on the Stanley Cup championship team. The owners, meanwhile, stood to earn $500,000 per playoff game played.

Talks continued after the players walked out, though it appeared for a time that the season was lost after union negotiators rejected the league's "final offer" on April 7. A United States Federal Mediator joined the negotiations the next day amidst pessimism over the two sides' willingness to negotiate. While the two sides had reached an agreement on most issues, negotiations on how revenue from trading cards was to be split became a key sticking point as the owners hoped to increase their share of the $16 million in annual revenues.

The strike ended on April 10 after the two sides reached an agreement on a two-year deal, retroactive to the beginning of the season, allowing the final 30 games of the regular season and the playoffs to go on. As part of the deal, the following seasons were expanded from 80 to 84 games (later reduced to 82 games, after the 1994–95 NHL lockout), and the players received a large increase in playoff bonuses and changes to free agency and arbitration. The two sides agreed to have each team play two games in neutral site locations, partly as a means of gauging interest in future expansion. The players conceded to the owners demands on a one-year deal, immediately creating fears that the owners could lock the players out following the 1992–93 season.

== Legacy ==
Goodenow called the strike a "major moment", stating "I don't think the owners took the players seriously and it wasn't until the strike that they understood the players were serious." The owners replaced Ziegler as president following the season, naming Gil Stein as interim president. In 1992-93 NHL season, Stein was the last president when the former National Basketball Association vice-president Gary Bettman became the first Commissioner of the NHL. Working towards labour peace was among the tasks handed to Bettman when the owners hired him. The spectre of a lockout was realized one year later than feared, as after playing the 1993–94 season without a valid CBA, the owners locked the players out on the eve of the 1994–95 season.
