= Brian O'Neill (ice hockey, born 1929) =

Canadian National Hockey League executive (1929–2023)

- Born: Brian Francis O'Neill; January 25, 1929; Montreal, Quebec, Canada
- Died: July 21, 2023 (aged 94); Montreal, Quebec, Canada
- Known for: National Hockey League executive

Brian Francis O'Neill (January 25, 1929 – July 21, 2023) was a Canadian sports executive who worked for the National Hockey League (NHL), reaching the level of executive vice president. O'Neill oversaw the NHL's expansion draft in 1967 and later looked after the NHL entry draft until he took over as executive vice-president after NHL president Clarence Campbell stepped down in 1977. With this new position, he doled out punishment on any disciplinary cases. He would also represent the league on the international front. He retired from his position with the NHL in 1992, concurrently with NHL president John Ziegler.

== Early life ==
O'Neill was born on January 25, 1929, and raised in Montreal, Quebec, Canada. He played hockey growing up and attended Loyola College for his Bachelor of Arts degree. Upon graduating, he earned his Bachelor of Commerce degree in economics at McGill University while playing ice hockey for the McGill Redbirds.

== Career ==
Upon graduating from McGill, O'Neill spent 10 years with a Canadian business magazine and managed Wallace Publishing Company. In 1962, he was appointed business manager of the Financial Times. In 1966, O'Neill was selected by Clarence Campbell to be his assistant manager with the eventual goal of succeeding him as president of the National Hockey League (NHL). While serving in this role, he was in charge of creating the season's schedule for the 1967 NHL expansion season. O'Neill organized the schedule in a way that allowed 444 games to be played in arenas within a span of 25 weeks in 12 cities as far as 2,704 miles apart. By 1971, he was appointed an executive director of the league and helped organize the NHL Amateur Draft. Beyond the draft, O'Neill used his position as executive director to promote a reduction in violent play on the ice, which he deemed "hooliganism".

After Campbell retired in 1977, O'Neill was named the NHL's executive vice-president and took over all player disciplinary cases. During his first few months in the position, he advocated for harsher penalties for dangerous plays on the ice which result in injury. When explaining his reasons for increased forms of discipline, O'Neill said: "Every penalty handed down serves two purposes. One is to penalize the player. The second is to act as a deterrent. If the message does not get across, then you have to increase the severity of the penalty. And that has been the case between now and, say, 10 years ago. There's been an inflationary factor to it." His management of disciplinary cases was met with criticism from players across the league, including Mike Bossy who said O'Neill had a conflict of interest as he was employed by the owners to punish the owners' employees. He argued that this was the reason for a lack of suspensions under O'Neill's rule.

On August 25, 1992, O'Neill officially stepped down from his position as executive vice-president. Prior to O'Neill's retiring, President-elect Gil Stein said: "the suspensions and drawn-out hearings which marked O'Neill's policing of the NHL had to go." Stein's critiques of O'Neill was met with criticism from the media, including from Michael Farber of the Montreal Gazette who wrote: "O'Neill treats the hockey public with more respect than Stein treated him."

== Later life ==
After the death of Red Dutton in 1987, O'Neill became a trustee for the Stanley Cup. In 1994, O'Neill was elected to the Hockey Hall of Fame.

O'Neill died in Montreal on July 21, 2023, at age 94. He was succeeded as a trustee of the Cup by Lanny McDonald.

Preceded by Red Dutton	Stanley Cup Trustee; 1988–2023	Succeeded by Lanny McDonald
