= Nontraditional hockey market =

An area where ice hockey is not traditionally played

A nontraditional hockey market is an area, generally in the United States, where ice hockey is not commonly played, and lacks the hockey infrastructure and history found in places such as Canada, Minnesota and New England. These places are usually in the Deep South, and other warmer areas of the United States where lakes would not traditionally freeze over during the winter, such as California and Southwestern United States. The National Hockey League (NHL) has seen significant expansion and relocation to such areas, especially since 1993, when Gary Bettman became the league's commissioner.

== History ==
The Wayne Gretzky trade to the Los Angeles Kings is considered responsible for bolstering the popularity of hockey in nontraditional hockey markets.

Hockey has traditionally been played in colder climates, such as Canada, Northern United States, Scandinavia and Russia, whereas places in the Sun Belt in the United States typically have comparatively less hockey infrastructure and history. In the National Hockey League (NHL), the original six teams were all located in either Canada, New England or The Midwest, with the first teams in a nontraditional hockey market coming in the 1967 expansion, both in California; the Los Angeles Kings and the California Golden Seals. Though the Kings still play in the league today, the Golden Seals only lasted 9 years until they relocated to Cleveland to become the Cleveland Barons in 1976, merging with the Minnesota North Stars two years later. The trade of all time NHL points leader Wayne Gretzky in 1988 to the Kings is considered by Nicholas Goss of Bleacher Report to have massively improved the popularity of the sport in nontraditional hockey markets.

Three years later, in 1991, the San Jose Sharks became the first team to appear in a nontraditional hockey market in the NHL, and were followed by a number of other expansions and relocations to nontraditional hockey markets. Gary Bettman, who became NHL commissioner in 1993, received a lifetime achievement award from the Sports Business Journal in 2023 that recognised his growing of the sport in nontraditional hockey markets. By 1995, professional and amateur hockey leagues alike were expanding into nontraditional hockey markets, with team owners seeing a potentially lucrative untapped market. When Tampa, Florida hosted the 1999 All-Star Game, this marked the first NHL All-Star game to be played in a nontraditional hockey market. That same year, the Dallas Stars became the first team in a nontraditional hockey market to win a Stanley Cup, and were later followed by three wins in a row from teams in such markets; the Tampa Bay Lightning in 2004, the Carolina Hurricanes and the Anaheim Ducks in 2007 (there was a lockout in 2005.)

In response to the 2001 Major League Baseball contraction plan, sports journalist Chris Bradford expressed the concern that something similar could happen in the NHL, and that nontraditional hockey market teams would be at the greatest risk of folding. Ultimately, contraction would never happen in the NHL, though the Atlanta Thrashers would relocate to Winnipeg in 2011, and the assets of the Arizona Coyotes were transferred to the new Utah Mammoth in 2024. The Vegas Golden Knights joining the league in 2017 saw the NHL once again expanding in nontraditional hockey markets, and marked the first major league sports team to be located in the city. Since 2020, only the Colorado Avalanche in 2022 have won a Stanley Cup whilst not being located in a nontraditional hockey market.

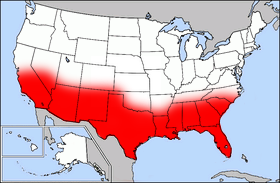
Typically, nontraditional hockey markets are in these areas. They are collectively known as the Sun Belt

Grassroots hockey in nontraditional hockey markets has vastly improved since more NHL teams have joined the league in these areas, especially Florida, with USA hockey saying the 2026 adult hockey registrations in the state were the third highest in the country. The Hurricanes, Stars and Florida Panthers all work with the league's 'Learn to Play' initiative, which provides equipment and access into the sport for children in their respective local areas.
