= Atlanta Thrashers relocation to Winnipeg =

Moving of an NHL team in 2011

Phillips Arena, now State Farm Arena, was the Atlanta Thrashers’ home arena

On June 21, 2011, the Atlanta Thrashers, an American professional hockey team that competed in the National Hockey League (NHL), relocated from its original city of Atlanta, Georgia to the Canadian city of Winnipeg. The team began to play as the Winnipeg Jets in the 2011–12 season, taking their name from the original Winnipeg Jets, who relocated to Phoenix, Arizona in 1996. Atlanta became the first city to lose two NHL franchises to relocation, after the Atlanta Flames moved to Calgary in 1980, becoming the Calgary Flames.

The Thrashers were created as an expansion team in 1999, the second of four expansion teams in the NHL from 1998 to 2000. In their twelve seasons in Atlanta, the Thrashers saw little success, with their sole playoff appearance coming after winning the Southeast Division in the 2006–07 season. The Thrashers were originally owned by Turner Broadcasting System (TBS), who sold the team to Atlanta Spirit in 2004, alongside the National Basketball Association (NBA) team Atlanta Hawks and the operating rights to Phillips Arena, the home arena of both teams. On May 31, 2011, it was announced that the Atlanta Spirit had reached a deal to sell the Thrashers to True North Sports & Entertainment for $170 million, after failing to find a buyer that would keep the team in Atlanta. True North announced they would be moving the team to Winnipeg on the same day, with the move being unanimously approved and finalised on June 21, 2011. On-ice struggles, poor attendance, a lack of revenue and owners who were unwilling to own an NHL team all contributed to the move.

== Background ==
Media mogul Ted Turner was granted the rights to an expansion franchise in 1997

Atlanta had previously hosted an NHL team, the Atlanta Flames, from 1972 to 1980. The team was founded as an expansion franchise in an attempt by the league to stay competitive with the rival World Hockey Association (WHA), who were the major competitor to the league at the time. In 1980, the team moved to Calgary following significant financial losses as a result of poor ticket sales and television revenue, with the move finalised on June 24, 1980.

The Thrashers were created as an expansion team for the 1999–2000 season after a 1997 announcement, just a year after the Nashville Predators joined as an expansion franchise. With teams such as the Florida Panthers, Tampa Bay Lightning and Anaheim Ducks joining the league earlier in the decade, this was seen as part of the NHL and commissioner Gary Bettman's push to promote hockey in nontraditional hockey markets. Turner Broadcasting System, owned by media mogul Ted Turner, were awarded the franchise and owned the team for its first four seasons. In 2000, TBS’s parent company were involved in the merger of AOL and Time Warner, becoming AOL-Time Warner. New ownership were very frugal with the team, with player Ray Ferraro later claiming he'd been told that they considered the team an afterthought, prioritising their more lucrative Atlanta Hawks and Atlanta Braves.

Ownership began looking to sell the team, alongside the Hakws and Phillips Arena in late 2002, with a deal agreed a year later to sell the team to a group of investors, collectively known as Atlanta Spirit LLC. The NHL approved the sale of the Thrashers on March 30, 2004, ending a drawn out and complex sale following the AOL and Time Warner merger. Atlanta Spirit quickly put the team on sale expecting to quickly flip the team for a profit, a fact only revealed after a series of lawsuits following the relocation and sale of Thrashers.

== Reasons for relocation ==
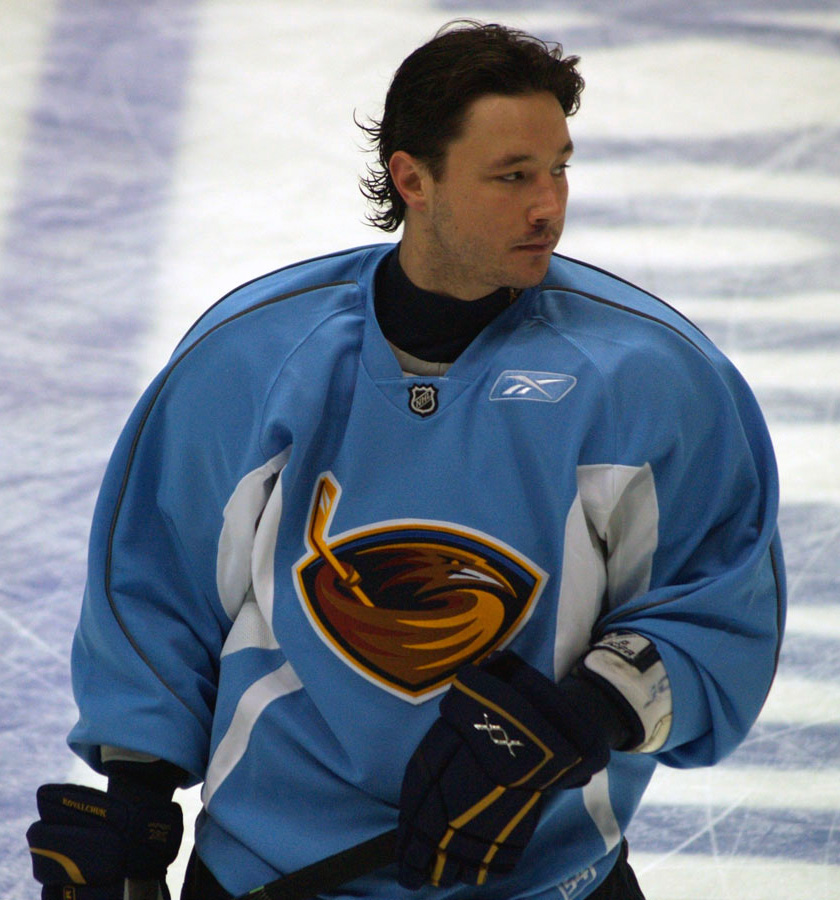
Franchise cornerstone Ilya Kovalchuk was traded in 2010 to the New Jersey Devils, which many fans saw as a sign of the team’s struggles

Despite several top draft selections, such as Patrik Štefan in 1999 and Ilya Kovalchuk in 2001, the Thrashers saw little success in their twelve years in the league. They made the playoffs only once, in the 2006–07 season, and were swept by the New York Rangers in the first round. As ownership were largely unwilling to spend on the team, stars such as Kovalchuk and Marián Hossa were traded, causing a lack of confidence in the ownership by many fans, resulting in dwindling attendance figures, subsequently leading to the franchise bleeding money, losing over $130 million in total. Though the frugality of ownership and major financial losses were the driving forces behind the sale and subsequent relocation of the team, the 2008 financial crisis worsened debts, and as Atlanta has suffered significantly from the crisis, potential buyers of the franchise were unwilling to own a team in a city still reeling from the recession.

== Relocation ==
Ownership originally intended for the team to be sold quickly, though their attempts were hamstrung due to a 2005 lawsuit by former Atlanta Spirit co-owner Steve Belkin, who had been ousted following a dispute regarding the signing of basketball player Joe Johnson. After Belkin agreed to settle in December 2010, ownership quickly put the team back up for sale, with co-owner Michael Gearon describing the need to make the sale as “urgen[t].” Atlanta Spirit were seeking $110 million for the sale of team. Amidst heavy speculation regarding relocation, the Thrashers played what would be their final NHL game in a 5-2 loss to the Pittsburgh Penguins. Though it was confirmed multiple buyers had expressed interest in keeping the team in Atalanta, ownership was unable to find a suitor willing to keep the team there, with Winnipeg emerging as the likely destination, and True North Sports & Entertainment as the likely buyers.

On May 31, 2011, the sale of the team to True North was officially announced, with Gearon announcing it at a press conference, breaking down in tears multiple times during it. Winger Evander Kane apologised and thanked Thrashers fans on social media for his two years there, whilst Chris Thorburn admitted his “first emotion was anger.” Scott Burnside blamed ownership for their indifference towards the team for the Thrashers relocation. On June 21, 2011, the sale and relocation of the team was finalised after the NHL board of commission unanimously approved it.

== Aftermath ==
The interest for a hockey team in Winnipeg became clear when the Jets sold out all 13,000 season tickets within 17 minutes of going on sale. Winnipeg initially took on only the history of the Thrashers, but in September 2026, they began including the history of the original Winnipeg Jets in an attempt to merge the history of the franchises. In their first six seasons, the Jets only made one playoff appearance, in 2015, though they have become much more competitive in the nine years since, making seven playoff appearances and winning the Presidents' Trophy in 2025. The last Atlanta Thrashers player on the Winnipeg Jets' roster was Blake Wheeler, who left the franchise after the 2022–23 season. Zach Bogosian of the Minnesota Wild is the last active player to have played for the Thrashers, though unrestricted free agent Evander Kane has not officially retired yet.

Atlanta has been the subject of significant discussion regarding a possible third expansion team, with the NHL in discussions with multiple groups planning to bring the NHL back to Atlanta, with proposed locations including North Point Mall and The Gathering at South Forsyth, and Krause Sports & Entertainment as a potential buyer.
