= Lester Patrick Trophy =

Ice hockey award for contributions to the sport in the United States

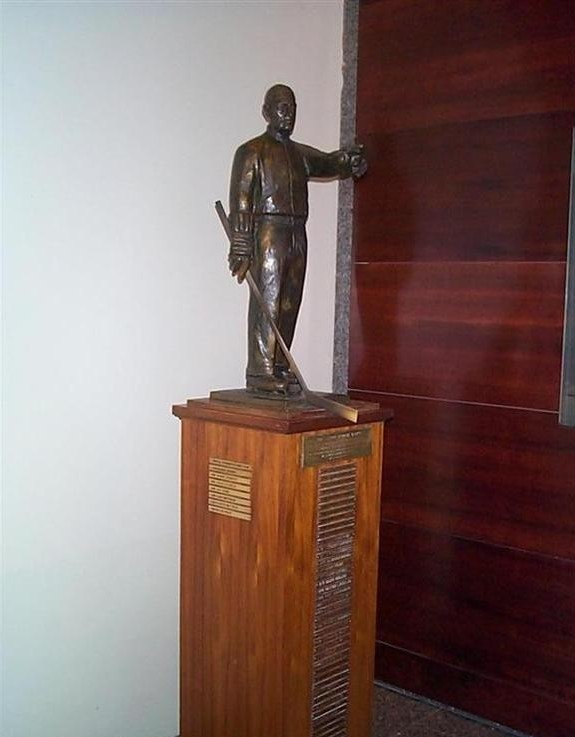
- Sport: Ice hockey
- Awarded for: Personnel who provide outstanding service to hockey in the United States.

History
- First award: 1966
- Most recent: Ray Shero, 2025

The Lester Patrick Trophy has been presented by the National Hockey League and USA Hockey since 1966 to honor a recipient's contribution to ice hockey in the United States. It is considered a non-NHL trophy because it may be awarded to players, coaches, officials, and other personnel outside the NHL. The trophy is named after Lester Patrick (1883–1960), player and longtime coach of the New York Rangers, who was a developer of ice hockey.

== History ==
The Lester Patrick Trophy was presented by the New York Rangers in 1966. It honors the late Lester Patrick, who was a general manager and coach of the club. It is presented annually for "outstanding service to hockey in the United States". Players, coaches, referees, and executives are eligible to receive the trophy, and are chosen by a committee including the National Hockey League (NHL) commissioner and a governor, a representative of the New York Rangers; and a previous inductee into the Hockey Hall of Fame's builder section, Hockey Hall of Fame player's section, U.S. Hockey Hall of Fame, NHL Broadcasters' Association, and the Professional Hockey Writers' Association. The trophy's first recipient was Jack Adams.

108 individuals, and three teams, have been given the trophy. The trophy has been given to women on two occasions; in 1999, the 1998 U.S. Olympic Women's Ice Hockey Team was presented the trophy along with Harry Sinden, and in 2007, Cammi Granato individually won the trophy. Granato was also a member of the 1998 U.S. Olympic Women's Ice Hockey Team that received the trophy in 1998.

== Recipients ==
^{†} - Trophy was awarded posthumously.

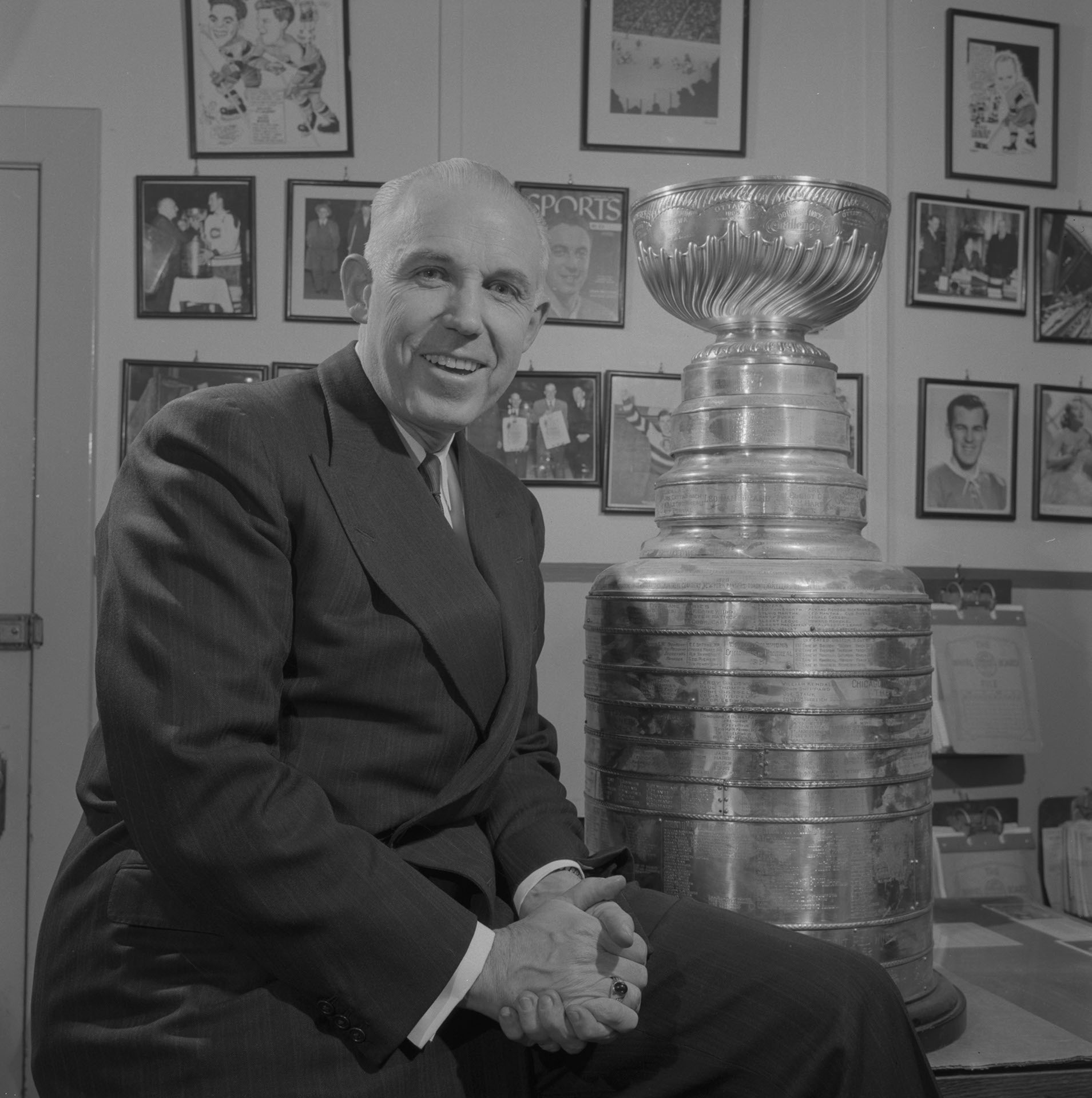
Clarence S. Campbell, winner in 1972.

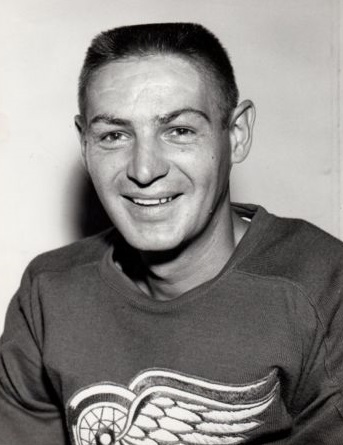
Terry Sawchuk, winner in 1971.

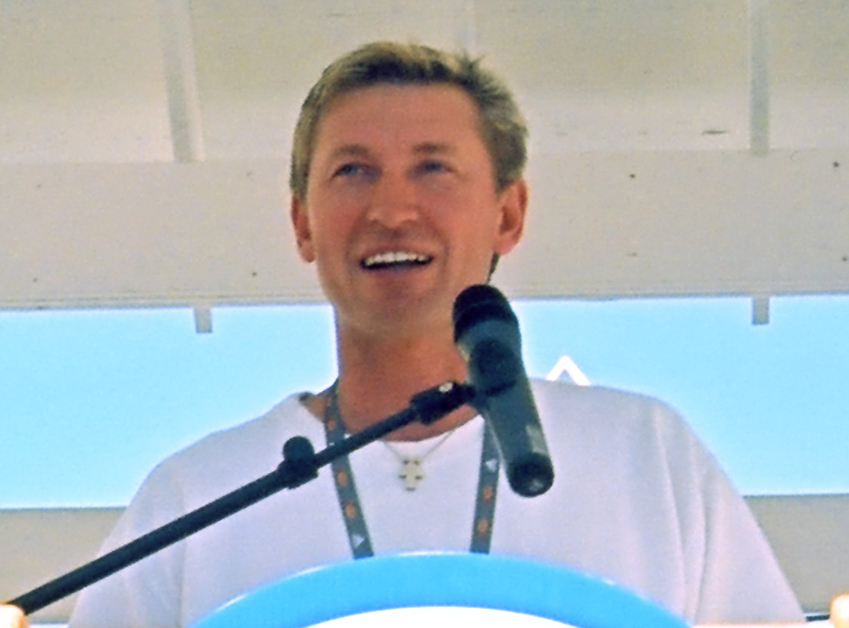
Wayne Gretzky, winner in 1994.

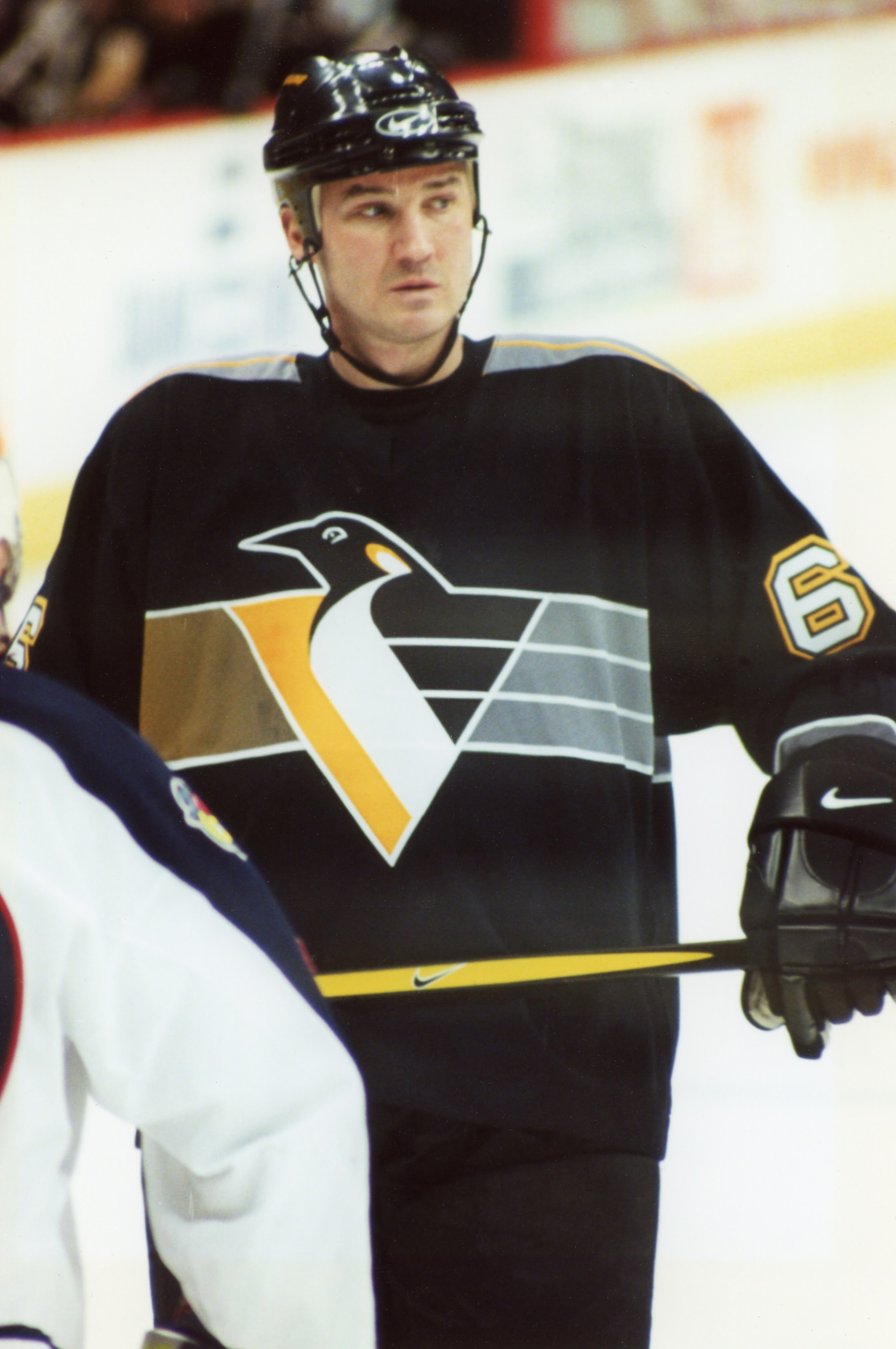
Mario Lemieux, winner in 2000.

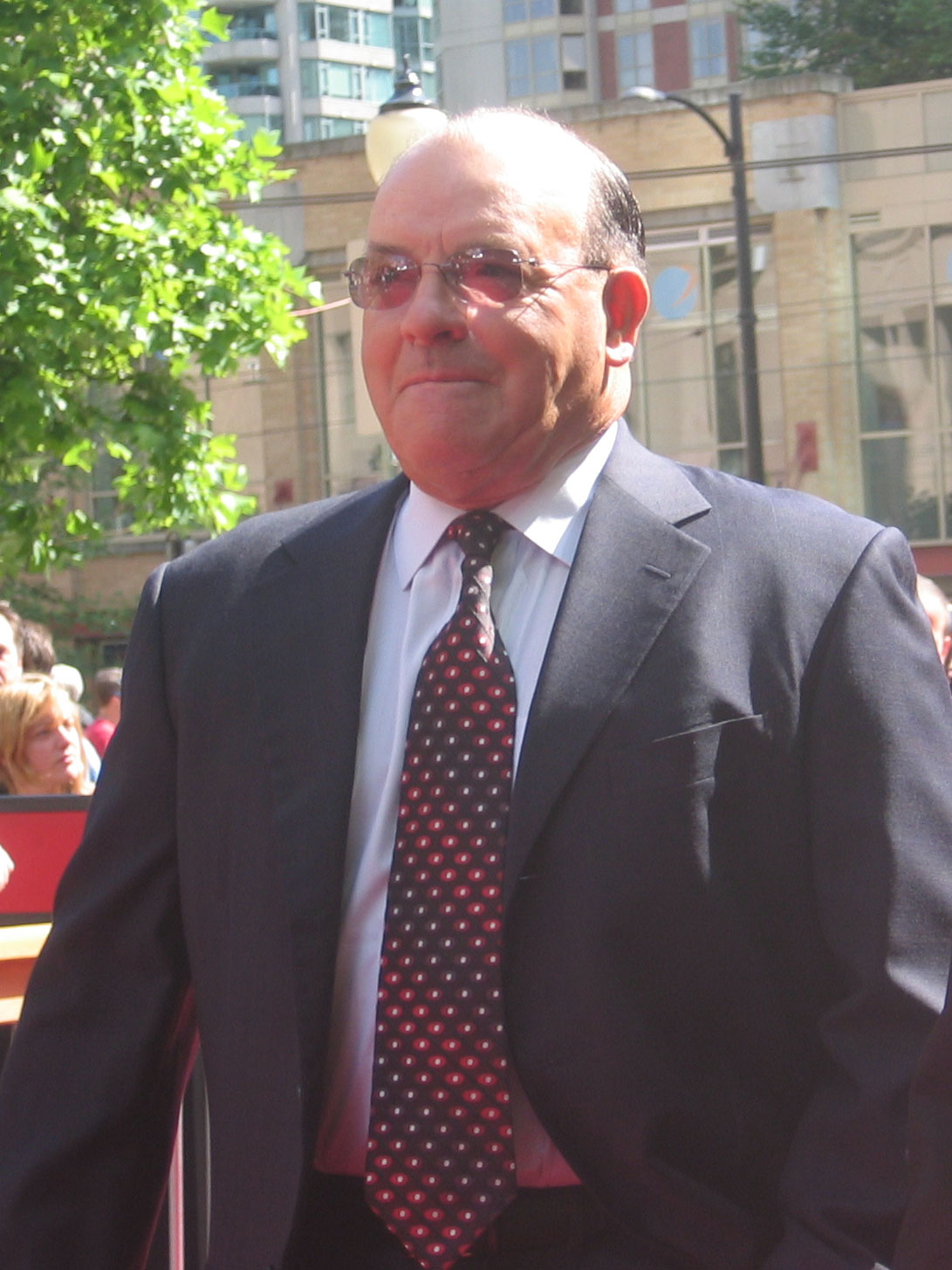
Scotty Bowman, winner in 2001.

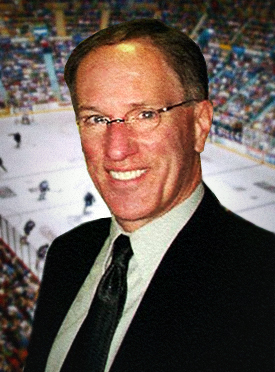
Mike "Doc" Emrick, winner in 2004.

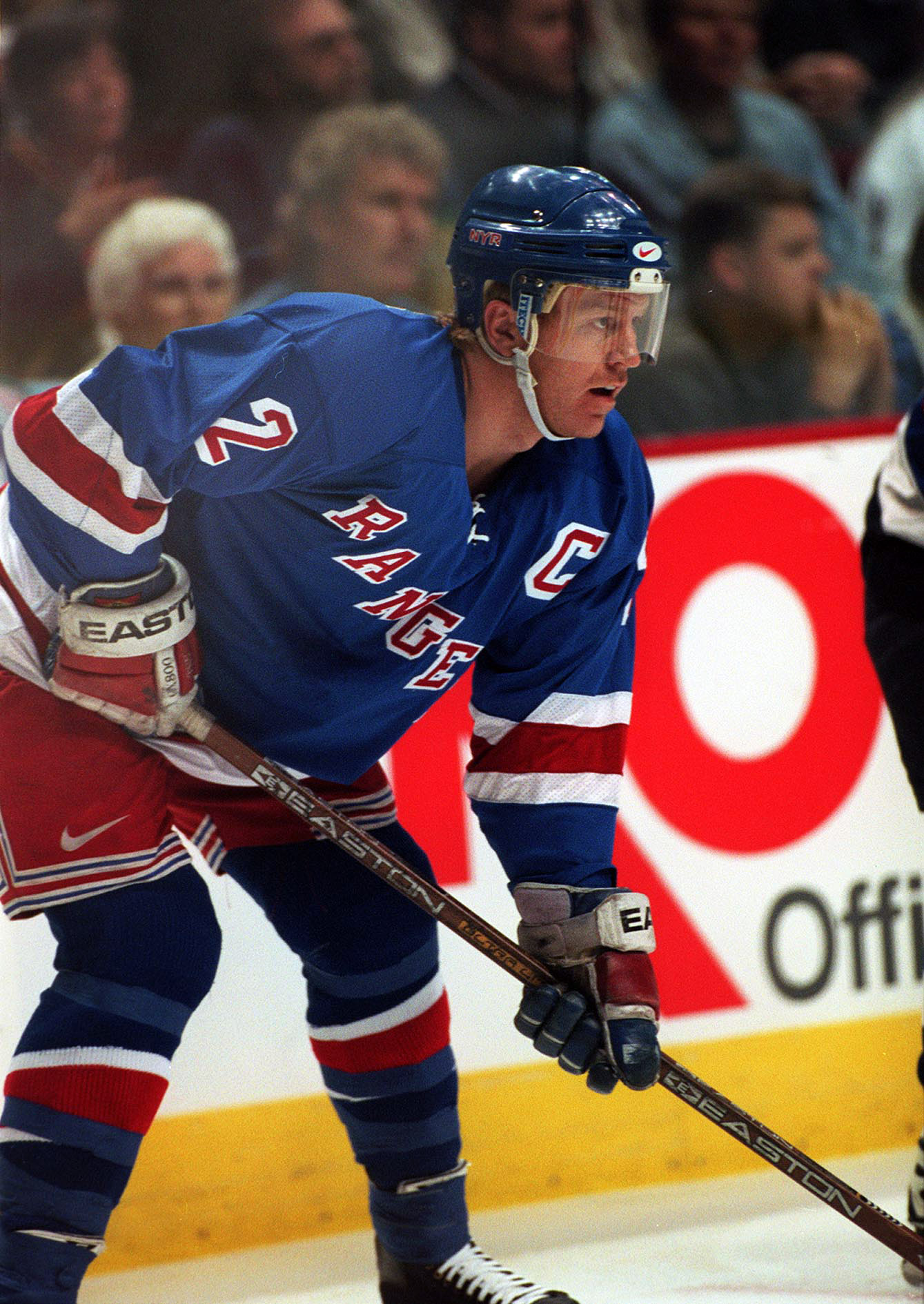
Brian Leetch, winner in 2007.

Year	Recipient	Role
1966	Jack Adams	Coach
1967	Gordie Howe	Player
1967	Charles Adams^{†}	Executive
1967	James E. Norris^{†}	Executive
1968	Tommy Lockhart	Executive
1968	Walter A. Brown^{†}	Executive
1968	John Kilpatrick^{†}	Executive
1969	Bobby Hull	Player
1969	Edward J. Jeremiah^{†}	Coach
1970	Eddie Shore	Player
1970	Jim Hendy^{†}	Executive
1971	William M. Jennings	Executive
1971	John B. Sollenberger^{†}	Executive
1971	Terry Sawchuk^{†}	Player
1972	Clarence S. Campbell	Executive
1972	John A. "Snooks" Kelley	Coach
1972	Ralph Weiland	Player
1972	James D. Norris^{†}	Executive
1973	Walter Bush	Executive
1974	Alex Delvecchio	Player
1974	Murray Murdoch	Coach
1974	Weston Adams^{†}	Executive
1974	Charles L. Crovat^{†}	Executive
1975	Donald M. Clark	Executive
1975	Bill Chadwick	Official
1975	Tommy Ivan	Coach
1976	Stan Mikita	Player
1976	Al Leader	Official
1976	Bruce Norris	Executive
1977	Johnny Bucyk	Player
1977	Murray Armstrong	Player
1977	John Mariucci	Multiple
1978	Phil Esposito	Player
1978	Tom Fitzgerald	Media
1978	William Thayer Tutt	Executive
1978	Bill Wirtz	Executive
1979	Bobby Orr	Player
1980	Bobby Clarke	Player
1980	Ed Snider	Executive
1980	Fred Shero	Coach
1980	1980 U.S. Olympic Men's Ice Hockey Team	Multiple
1981	Charles M. Schulz	Executive
1982	Emile Francis	Multiple
1983	Bill Torrey	Executive
1984	John Ziegler, Jr.	Executive
1984	Art Ross^{†}	Executive
1985	Jack Butterfield	Executive
1985	Arthur M. Wirtz	Executive
1986	John MacInnes^{†}	Coach
1986	John P. Riley Jr.	Coach
1987	Hobey Baker^{†}	Player
1987	Frank Mathers	Coach
1988	Keith Allen	Executive
1988	Fred Cusick	Executive
1988	Bob Johnson	Coach
1989	Dan Kelly^{†}	Executive
1989	Lou Nanne	Multiple
1989	Lynn Patrick^{†}	Player
1989	Bud Poile	Multiple
1990	Len Ceglarski	Player
1991	Rod Gilbert	Player
1991	Mike Ilitch	Executive
1992	Al Arbour	Coach
1992	Art Berglund	Executive
1992	Lou Lamoriello	Executive
1993	Frank Boucher^{†}	Player
1993	Red Dutton^{†}	Executive
1993	Bruce McNall	Executive
1993	Gil Stein	Executive
1994	Wayne Gretzky	Player
1994	Robert Ridder	Executive
1995	Joe Mullen	Player
1995	Brian Mullen	Player
1995	Robert W. Fleming	Executive
1996	George Gund III	Executive
1996	Ken Morrow	Player
1996	Milt Schmidt	Multiple
1997	Seymour H. Knox III^{†}	Executive
1997	Bill Cleary	Player
1997	Pat LaFontaine	Player
1998	Peter Karmanos Jr.	Executive
1998	Neal Broten	Player
1998	John Mayasich	Player
1998	Max McNab	Multiple
1999	Harry Sinden	Executive
1999	1998 U.S. Olympic Women's Ice Hockey Team	Multiple
2000	Mario Lemieux	Player
2000	Craig Patrick	Executive
2000	Lou Vairo	Coach
2001	Gary Bettman	Executive
2001	Scotty Bowman	Coach
2001	David Poile	Executive
2002	Herb Brooks	Coach
2002	Larry Pleau	Multiple
2002	1960 U.S. Olympic Men's Ice Hockey Team	Multiple
2003	Willie O'Ree	Player
2003	Ray Bourque	Player
2003	Ron DeGregorio	Executive
2004	Doc Emrick	Media
2004	John Davidson	Media
2004	Ray Miron	Executive
2005	2004–05 NHL lockout; no winner	-
2006	Red Berenson	Multiple
2006	Marcel Dionne	Player
2006	Reed Larson	Player
2006	Glen Sonmor	Coach
2006	Steve Yzerman	Player
2007	Brian Leetch	Player
2007	Cammi Granato	Player
2007	Stan Fischler	Media
2007	John Halligan	Executive
2008	Ted Lindsay	Player
2008	Bob Naegele, Jr.	Executive
2008	Brian Burke	Executive
2008	Phil Housley	Player
2009	Mark Messier	Player
2009	Mike Richter	Player
2009	Jim Devellano	Executive
2010	Dave Andrews	Executive
2010	Cam Neely	Multiple
2010	Jack Parker	Coach
2010	Jerry York	Coach
2011	Mark Johnson	Coach
2011	Jeff Sauer	Coach
2011	Tony Rossi	Executive
2011	Bob Pulford	Multiple
2012	Bob Chase	Media
2012	Dick Patrick	Executive
2013	Kevin Allen	Media
2014	Bill Daly	Executive
2014	Paul Holmgren	Multiple
2015	Jeremy Jacobs	Executive
2015	Bob Crocker	Multiple
2016	Mark Howe	Player
2016	Patrick J. Kelly	Executive
2017	Peter Lindberg	Executive
2017	Dave Ogrean	Executive
2018	Jim Johannson^{†}	Executive
2019	Jack Blatherwick	Multiple
2020	Lynn Olson	Multiple
2021	Jack Barzee	Multiple
2022	Warren Strelow^{†}	Multiple
2023	Joe Bertagna	Multiple
2024	Sam Rosen	Media
2025	Ray Shero^{†}	Executive

== Notes and references ==
General

- "Lester Patrick Trophy". NHL. Archived from the original on October 9, 2021.
- "Lester Patrick Trophy". Hockey Hall of Fame. Archived from the original on December 1, 2017.

Specific
