= Jack Blatherwick (ice hockey) =

American hockey training physiologist

- Born: Minnesota, USA
- Education: PhD, 1975, University of Minnesota School of Physiology
- Awards: Lester Patrick Trophy

Jack Allan Hayes Blatherwick is an American hockey training physiologist. Blatherwick helped Herb Brooks train the 1980 U.S. Olympic Team and then joined Brooks' staff on the New York Rangers. In 2019, Blatherwick was the recipient of the Lester Patrick Trophy "for outstanding service to hockey in the United States."

== Early life and education ==
Blatherwick earned his PhD in physiology from the University of Minnesota in 1975, writing his dissertation on teaching speed through off-ice training. He tested 3,000 players from pee-wee to National Hockey League (NHL) level and verified the off-ice attributes could increase skating speed and acceleration. While earning his doctoral degree, Blatherwick coached the ice hockey team at Breck School. However, he was fired in 1974 due to a "philosophical dispute."

== Career ==
Upon completing his PhD, Blatherwick worked with the Auggies hockey team at Augsburg University, testing them on strength, speed and endurance using methods that he had personally developed. After the Auggies won the NAIA Ice Hockey Championship, Herb Brooks asked Blatherwick to test the members of the 1978–79 Minnesota Golden Gophers on the ice and in a laboratory setting. His methods for endurance included short under-five second bursts of flat-out speed, followed by a slowdown period to resemble periods during games. Blatherwick suggested to Brooks that he runs practise at faster speeds to better prepare players for game settings. His methods gained recognition from the National Hockey League (NHL) and he worked part-time as a conditioning coach for the Minnesota North Stars, earning the nickname Cardiac Jack because of his workouts and continuous use of the words 'cardiovascular fitness.' A year later, Brooks and Blatherwick repeated the tests during the tryouts for the United States 1980 Olympic Team. Following that experience, Blatherwick said, "that was the first time I saw one physiological measure that separates elite players from those who are very good.”

Blatherwick worked closely with Brooks to train and develop players during the 1980 Olympics; studying films to develop drills and create practice plans. He later said Brooks would call him early in the morning to discuss on- and off-ice practice routines. As the United States beat the Soviet Union in what was later called the Miracle on Ice, team captain Mike Eruzione praised Blatherwick's training as a key feature in their gold medal win. Brooks' son Daniel later said: "I don't think the Miracle on Ice could have happened without Jack." Their relationship continued after the Olympics and he followed Brooks to the New York Rangers as a conditioning coach and returned to coach the United States Olympic team before the 1984 Winter Olympics. While working with the Rangers, Blatherwick conditioned players "through such off-ice flexibility exercises as a series of two-legged and one-legged jumps wearing weighted vests and running in place on a portable jumping pit with quick high-knee lifts." From 1986 until 1991, Blatherwick worked a conditioning coach for the Gophers. He then spent one season as the head coach of Hopkins ice hockey team before joining Brooks as an assistant coach with the New Jersey Devils in 1992.

In 2005, Blatherwick established the Hockey Development Committee to "set the development structure for MYHA girls and boys teams from Termites through Jr. Gold within the guidelines and rules of District 6, MN Hockey and USA Hockey." In 2009, he was inducted into the Minnesota Hockey Coaches Association Hall of Fame. Blatherwick later joined the Washington Capitals organization as their exercise physiologist, earning praise from strength and conditioning coach John Wawrzyniak. In 2019, Blatherwick was the recipient of the Lester Patrick Trophy "for outstanding service to hockey in the United States."

== Selected publications ==
- A Physiological Profile of an Elite Ice Hockey Player: The Importance of Skating Speed and Acceleration (1989)
