= Lynn Olson =

American ice hockey executive

- Born: Richfield, Minnesota
- Children: 2
- Awards: Lester Patrick Trophy

Lynn Olson is an American ice hockey executive and retired paralegal. Olson became the first woman hired to work for the USA Hockey's girls and women's section in 1988. She was also a part of the movement that led Minnesota to become the first state to recognize girls' hockey as a varsity sport.

== Career ==
Olson was born and raised in Richfield, Minnesota where she graduated from Richfield High School. Following the birth of her second daughter, Olson began skating on a senior women's ice hockey team. She played hockey in the Minnesota Women's Hockey League which comprised 12 teams in two divisions. In 1984, Olsen used her paralegal background to draft articles, bylaws, and operating rules for the league. She was subsequently elected president of the league in 1985 where she then requested the Minnesota Amateur Hockey Association be accepted as an affiliate. In 1986, the merging was completed and Lynn was elected Women's Hockey Director.

While serving as Women's Hockey Director, Olson continued to advocate for girls and women's ice hockey. While her daughters were enrolled at the Academy of Holy Angels, she prompted the Minnesota State High School League to sanction girls ice hockey as a varsity sport in 1994. This resulted in Minnesota becoming the first state to recognize girls' hockey as a varsity sport. She coached the first varsity girls’ high school game sanctioned by the Minnesota State High School League on November 14, 1994. In their inaugural 1994–95 season, Minnesota had 24 girls high school hockey teams. Following this, Olson also helped establish the Minnesota Golden Gophers women's ice hockey program.

Beyond Minnesota, Olson also advocated for the International Ice Hockey Federation and the International Olympic Committee to have women's hockey included in the Olympics. She became the first woman hired to work USA Hockey's girls and women's section in 1988, but it served only as an advisory panel to the board of directors. Her efforts were proven successful in 1992 when it was approved by the IOC. In 2015, Olson was named the recipient of the AHCA's Joe Burke Award as someone who has "shown great support and dedication to Girls/Women's hockey."

In 2020, Olson was named the recipient of the Lester Patrick Trophy for outstanding service to hockey in the United States. She was also named a 2021 Academy of Holy Angels Activities Hall of Fame Inductee.

== Personal life ==
Olson is married to a firefighter.
