= John Ziegler Jr. =

American ice hockey executive (1934–2018)

4th President of the National Hockey League
- In office 1977–1992
- Preceded by: Clarence Campbell
- Succeeded by: Gil Stein

Personal details
- Born: February 9, 1934 Grosse Pointe, Michigan, U.S.
- Died: October 25, 2018 (aged 84) Sewall's Point, Florida, U.S.
- Education: University of Michigan (BA, JD)
- Occupation: Lawyer, former NHL president, ice hockey owner and governor
- Awards: Lester Patrick Trophy; Hockey Hall of Fame, 1987

John Augustus Ziegler Jr. (February 9, 1934 – October 25, 2018) was an American lawyer and ice hockey executive. Upon succeeding Clarence Campbell in 1977, he became the fourth president of the National Hockey League (NHL). Ziegler served as league president through 1992. His 15-year term was marked by the 1979 merger that integrated four teams from the rival World Hockey Association into the NHL, and by increasing labor unrest among the players. The first American to serve as chief executive of the NHL, he received the Lester Patrick Trophy in 1984 and was inducted into the Hockey Hall of Fame in 1987.

== Early life and career ==
Born in Grosse Pointe, Michigan, in 1934, John Augustus Ziegler, Jr., lived with his family in the Detroit area's eastern, lakefront suburb of St. Clair Shores, graduating from Lake Shore High School in 1951. He would go on to attend the University of Michigan in Ann Arbor, Michigan, obtaining both an undergraduate degree and a Juris Doctor degree, the latter in 1957.

Before becoming National Hockey League President in 1977, Ziegler practiced law initially with the firm Dickinson, Wright, McKean and Cudlip, in Detroit, Michigan, and after 1970 on his own. He was involved in the ownership of the Detroit Red Wings, and served one year as chairman of the NHL Board of Governors. Ziegler had also been the Vice-Chairman of the England-based London Lions independent professional ice hockey franchise.

== President of the National Hockey League ==
Prior to the 1978–79 season, a failed manipulation of the waiver system by the Montreal Canadiens led Pierre Bouchard's rights to move from Montreal to Washington. The deal had the Capitals return Bouchard back to Montreal in exchange for Rod Schutt, but Ziegler rejected the deal citing league bylaws which the Board of Governors refused to change. Bouchard believed the Canadiens never intended to get him back. Initially unhappy with the move, Bouchard played only one game in the 1978–79 season and considered retirement. However, he returned next season to the NHL with Washington where he finished his career playing four seasons.

Ziegler, along with Alan Eagleson, announced on August 6, 1979, that protective helmets would become mandatory in the NHL. The new rule had a grandfather clause that granted players who had signed pro contracts prior to June 1, 1979, the option of wearing helmets or not. Those who chose not to wear one signed liability waivers.

=== NHL–WHA merger ===
Ziegler was the NHL's first American chief executive, and the American teams were far less hostile to the idea of a merger with the World Hockey Association than their Canadian counterparts. There were a number of reasons for this, but probably the most compelling was the Montreal Canadiens' dominance of the NHL during the years of the WHA's existence. The Canadiens won five of the seven Stanley Cups during this time, including four in a row from 1976 through 1979. Montreal owed this success in large part to its ability to resist WHA efforts to lure away its players, and many American teams believed they were able to do this because Canadian Hockey Night in Canada television revenues were mostly distributed among the three Canadian teams instead of across the league. Hence, adding Canadian teams would lessen the financial advantage that teams like the Canadiens had. Also, both NHL and WHA owners realized that the Canadian markets were a vital economic base, both to the WHA and any future rival league that might take its place. Absorbing the Canadian markets would therefore preclude the possibility of the NHL having to fight off another rival league.

In June 1977, Ziegler announced that the NHL had created a committee to investigate the possibility of a merger, while Bill DeWitt, Jr., owner of the WHA's Cincinnati Stingers, stated that Ziegler had invited six teams to join the league for the 1977–78 season if various conditions could be met. The proposal would have seen the six teams become full members of the NHL, but play in their own division with a separate schedule for the first year.

Led by Toronto's Harold Ballard, the owners voted down Ziegler's proposal. The Calgary Cowboys, who had hoped to be one of the six teams to join the NHL, subsequently folded, as did the Phoenix Roadrunners, Minnesota Fighting Saints, and San Diego Mariners. This reduced the junior league down to eight teams for the 1977–78 WHA season, and left its long-term future in doubt. The merger was completed in the 1979–80 season, with four WHA teams, the Edmonton Oilers, Winnipeg Jets, Hartford Whalers and Quebec Nordiques, joining the NHL.

=== Suspensions handed out by Ziegler ===
Following a 4–3 Boston Bruins victory over the New York Rangers at Madison Square Garden on December 23, 1979, an on-ice fray occurred between the players from both teams. During the fray, a Rangers fan cut the face of Bruins player Stan Jonathan with a rolled-up program and grabbed his hockey stick. Boston Bruin Terry O'Reilly climbed over the Plexiglas and went into the stands in pursuit of the offender, followed by fellow Bruin Peter McNab and other teammates. Another Bruin, Mike Milbury, who had actually reached the visitors' locker room when his teammates started going into the stands, raced back to join his colleagues in the brawl. He caught the unruly spectator, removed one of his shoes and, while holding the heel end, hit him hard once with the sole side. Subsequently, Ziegler suspended O'Reilly for eight games and McNab and Milbury for six, with each being fined $500. This incident also resulted in the installation of higher glass panels enclosing rinks in hockey arenas.

In December 1986, Los Angeles Kings head coach Pat Quinn signed a contract to become coach and general manager of the Vancouver Canucks with just months left on his Kings contract. Ziegler suspended Quinn for the rest of the season and barred him from taking over Vancouver's hockey operations until June. Ziegler also barred him from coaching anywhere in the NHL until the 1990–91 season. In Ziegler's view, Quinn's actions created a serious conflict of interest that could only be resolved by having him removed as coach.

The 1988 Stanley Cup playoff series between the New Jersey Devils and Boston Bruins featured the infamous confrontation between Devils coach Jim Schoenfeld and referee Don Koharski after Game 3, when, during an argument in the tunnel after the game, Koharski tripped and fell, accusing Schoenfeld of pushing him. Schoenfeld famously responded, "Good, 'cause you fell you fat pig!" Then, he yelled "Have another doughnut! Have another doughnut!" The incident was played repeatedly on ESPN and has since become part of NHL lore. Schoenfeld was suspended by Ziegler for Game 4, but the Devils received an injunction from a New Jersey court, allowing Schoenfeld to coach the fourth game. In protest, the officials scheduled to work that game in the Meadlowands refused to take the ice, forcing the NHL to scramble for amateur officials to call the contest. The injunction was lifted and Schoenfeld served his suspension during Game 5 in the Boston Garden.

In 1990, Edmonton Oilers goaltender Grant Fuhr came forward about his drug use after spending two weeks in a counseling center in Florida. He admitted that he used "a substance"—he did not say cocaine—for some seven years, or most of the period that the Oilers rested at the top of the NHL. Details of Fuhr's drug use were supplied by the player's ex-wife, Corrine, who told the press in Edmonton that she often found cocaine hidden in his clothing and that she fielded numerous threatening telephone calls from drug dealers who had not been paid. These embarrassing details no doubt contributed to the one-year suspension handed down in September 1990 by Ziegler, who called Fuhr's conduct "dishonorable and against the welfare of the league." Once Fuhr was reinstated, fans of opposing teams taunted him at games with bags of sugar.

=== Soviet players in the NHL ===
In 1987, the All-Star Game was pre-empted in favor of Rendez-vous '87, held at Le Colisée in Quebec City. Like the Challenge Cup before it, Rendez-Vous '87 was an event where the best the NHL could offer played against a Soviet squad which had an entire year to prepare. To reduce the possibility of the NHL being embarrassed again, Rendez-Vous '87 was a two-game affair. The series was split between the two teams with a game apiece. During the series, Ziegler stated that Soviet players would never be able to join the NHL because of the way the Soviet hockey program worked, and that NHLers would never be able to play in the Winter Olympics, both of which, as events would turn out, would eventually happen.

Pavel Bure was selected 113th overall in the 6th round of the 1989 NHL entry draft by the Vancouver Canucks, following his rookie season with CSKA Moscow. The pick was controversial, as the Canucks had chosen him seemingly a year ahead of his eligible draft season. At the age of 18, he was available to be chosen in the first three rounds of the draft, but in order to be selected any later than that, he would have to have played in at least two seasons (with a minimum of 11 games per season) for his elite-level European club, the Central Red Army. However, the Canucks' head scout at the time, Mike Penny, discovered that Bure had played in additional exhibition and international games to make him an eligible late-round draft choice a year early. Several other teams either had similar knowledge or had pursued Bure, but there was confusion as to the legitimacy of the extra games. The Detroit Red Wings had inquired to league vice president Gil Stein as to Bure's supposed availability prior to their fifth-round pick, but were told that he was not eligible. Winnipeg Jets general manager Mike Smith claimed he travelled to Moscow prior to the draft and made an offer to the Soviet Ice Hockey Federation. The deal involved a transfer fee to be paid to the Soviets over three years, after which time Bure would join the Jets as a 21-year-old. Smith did not have any plans to draft Bure in 1989, however, as he believed Bure was ineligible. General manager Pat Quinn originally intended to draft Bure in the eighth round, but after receiving word that the Edmonton Oilers had similar intentions, he selected him in the sixth. Detroit's European scout Christer Rockström immediately began protesting, while several other unidentified team representatives reportedly stormed the Met Center stage in Minnesota, where the draft was being held, following the announcement of Bure's selection. The Hartford Whalers and Washington Capitals then filed formal complaints to the league, resulting in an investigation into the selection. After the pick was deemed illegal by league president Ziegler in a press release on May 17, 1990, the Canucks appealed the decision, procuring game sheets proving Bure's participation in the additional games with the help of recent Soviet acquisition Igor Larionov. It was not until the eve of the 1990 NHL entry draft, in which Bure would have been re-entered, that the draft choice was upheld.

=== Labor relations, ouster and aftermath ===
Bobby Orr was involved in the 1991 lawsuit of retired NHL players against the NHL over its control of the players' pension fund. Eagleson was involved there too, arranging for the players to give up a seat on the trusteeship of the pension fund in 1969 to gain the acceptance of the NHLPA with the NHL owners. Orr and ex-Bruin Dave Forbes discussed the lawsuit with the sports newspaper The National. Orr: "Our money is being used to pay pensions for current players". The NHL's response was to file a notice of libel and slander against Orr and Forbes. Carl Brewer defended Orr in a letter to then-NHL president John Ziegler: "It is regrettable that the NHL and the member clubs would resort to such treatment of one of our game's icons, Bobby Orr. And isn't it interesting that baseball players who started their pension plan in 1947, as did the NHL, have assets in their plan of some US$500 million while we, as far as we can understand, have US$31.9 million." The pension lawsuit was finally won by the players in 1994 after two courts ruled against the NHL. The NHL had appealed the case to the Supreme Court of Canada, which decided not to hear the case. During his time in office, the NHL did not have a substance-abuse program, instead leaving it to the discretion of the teams, with his later defense being: “Alcohol does produce problems from time to time. But there was nothing that stood out about professional sports generally and hockey specifically.”

Ziegler was ultimately forced out of office after the 1991–92 NHL season due to the settlement which resolved the ten-day strike. Gil Stein was the next and the last president of the NHL in 1992–93. Alan Eagleson was succeeded as National Hockey League Players' Association executive-director on January 1, 1992, by former player agent Bob Goodenow. He had served as deputy director of the NHLPA since 1990, and had spent his time instructing the players on the issues the union faced in its relations with the league. As executive-director, Goodenow was tasked with negotiating a new collective bargaining agreement, which had expired prior to the start of the 1991–92 NHL season. Goodenow met with Ziegler as the two attempted to negotiate an agreement on a range of issues including how free agency worked, the arbitration process, playoff bonuses, and pensions. The issue of how to share trading card revenue was considered to be one of the greatest stumbling blocks the two sides faced. In Ziegler's last season at the helm of the NHL, the San Jose Sharks started play (which marked a return of the NHL to the San Francisco Bay area after a 15-year layoff), sparking the NHL's next expansion wave of the 1990s.

Gary Bettman became the first NHL Commissioner during the 1992–93 season. Bettman quickly accomplished one of his stated goals by signing a five-year, $155 million deal with the Fox Broadcasting Company to broadcast NHL games nationally beginning in the 1994–95 season. The deal was significant, as a network television contract in the United States was long thought unattainable during the presidency of Ziegler. Ziegler moved back to his legal career by practicing in Detroit, then as alternate Governor with the Chicago Blackhawks before moving to Florida, where he would remain until his death in 2018.

Sporting positions
Preceded by Bill Wirtz	Chairman of the NHL Board of Governors; 1976–1977	Succeeded by Bill Wirtz
Preceded by Clarence Campbell	National Hockey League President; 1977–1992	Succeeded by Gil Stein
