= NHL commissioner =

NHL highest executive position

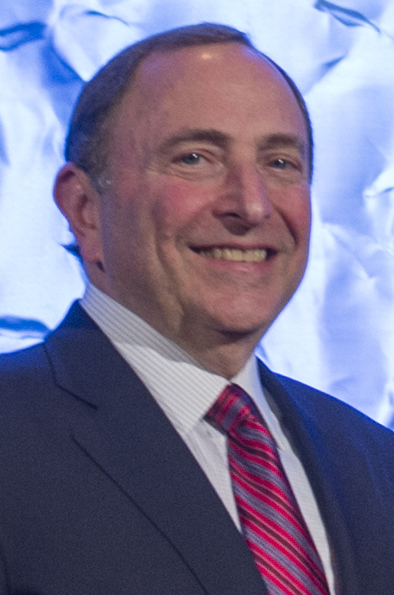
- Incumbent; Gary Bettman since February 1, 1993
- Appointer: NHL Board of Governors
- Inaugural holder: Gary Bettman
- Formation: February 1, 1993
- Website: www.nhl.com

The National Hockey League commissioner (French: Commissaire de la LNH) is the highest-ranking executive officer in the National Hockey League (NHL). The position was created in 1993; Gary Bettman was named the first commissioner and remains the only person to fill the position to date. Among other duties, the commissioner leads collective bargaining negotiations on behalf of the league and appoints officials for all NHL games.

Until 1993, the NHL's top executive was the league president, and for five months in 1993, the league had both a commissioner and a president. The roles were amalgamated on July 1, 1993. The presidency originated in the National Hockey Association (NHA), which Frank Calder presided over jointly as NHA acting president and NHL president in the period of the NHL's founding and the NHA's suspension.

== Definition and duties ==
According to the NHL Constitution, Article VI, section 6.1:

"6.1 Office of Commissioner, Election and Term of Office The League shall employ a Commissioner selected by the Board of Governors. The Commissioner shall serve as the Chief Executive Officer of the League and is charged with protecting the integrity of the game of professional hockey and preserving public confidence in the League. The Board of Governors shall determine the term of office and compensation of the Commissioner. The Commissioner shall be elected a majority of the Governors present and voting at a League meeting at which a quorum was present when it was convened."

In Section 6.3, the commissioner's duties are spelled out as having "responsibility for the general supervision and direction of all business and affairs of the league", co-ordinates matters between member clubs and serves as the principal public spokesman for the league. The commissioner also has authority over dispute resolution, league committees, interpretation of league rules, appointment of league staff, NHL financial matters, contracting authority, scheduling, officials and disciplinary powers. The commissioner also determines the date and places of board of governors meetings.

== NHL presidents (1917–1993) ==
=== Frank Calder (1917–1943) ===
Calder wielded his power as president with such authority that he was rarely opposed. When he ordered the Quebec Bulldogs franchise forfeited to Hamilton, as happened in 1920, no one challenged him. An example of his authority was when the Hamilton Tigers went on strike in 1925. Rather than talk to the players, he suspended and fined them $200 each.

Calder was adamant about not restricting racial minorities' entry into the NHL. During the 1927–28 season, upon hearing of the Boston Black Panthers, the first all-black hockey team, he was reported to have remarked, "Pro hockey has no ruling against the coloured man, nor is it likely to ever draw the line", a reference to the segregation in baseball. Only one attempt to remove Calder as president of the NHL was made. This was in 1932–33 when the owner of the Chicago Black Hawks, Frederic McLaughlin, circulated a letter to the NHL board of governors to remove him. The board rejected the motion.

Commencing with the 1932–33 season, Calder named the top rookie in the NHL. Starting in 1936–37, he got the NHL's board of governors to let him buy a trophy to give to the league's top rookie and he did this until 1941–42. After his death, the trophy was made permanent as the Calder Memorial Trophy. Calder received a silver service in 1937–38 for his 20 years as president of the NHL and the league extended their appreciation.

=== Red Dutton (1943–1946) ===
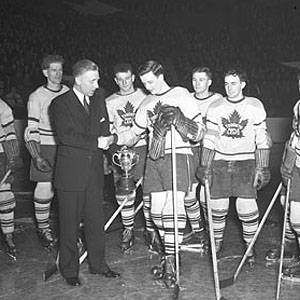
NHL president Red Dutton shown presenting the Calder Memorial Trophy to Gus Bodnar in 1944.

Dutton was named managing director (acting president) of the NHL after the death of Frank Calder in February 1943, running the league at the direction of a subcommittee of the NHL Board of Governors. In 1944, members of the board approached the Maple Leafs' owner Conn Smythe to become president, but he turned it down. Dutton was eventually convinced to assume the presidency in 1945, but in September 1946, amid frustrations with the Board of Governors for their cancellation of the suspended Brooklyn Americans franchise that he had sought to revive, he handed over the reins to his assistant, Clarence Campbell, a former NHL referee who had just returned from military service in Europe and had been in the job for less than a month.

=== Clarence Campbell (1946–1977) ===
One of Clarence Campbell's first acts of authority was in 1948, when he expelled players Billy Taylor and Don Gallinger from the NHL for betting on games.

As NHL president, Campbell is perhaps best remembered for suspending Montreal Canadiens superstar Maurice Richard for the remaining three games of the 1955 regular season and for the entirety of the playoffs. His action came as a result of Richard's punching of linesman Cliff Thompson during a March 13 game with the Boston Bruins (Thompson was holding Richard, allowing Boston's Hal Laycoe to punch the Rocket). On March 17, Campbell attended a game at the Montreal Forum between the Canadiens and the Detroit Red Wings. Throughout the first period he was taunted and pelted with debris by outraged Montreal fans, who saw him as a prime example of the city's English-Canadian elite oppressing the French-Canadian majority. After a tear gas bomb was released in the arena, Campbell exited the building, the game was forfeited to the Red Wings, and the Forum was evacuated. What ensued was a full-fledged riot in which 60 people were arrested and $500,000 in damage was done.

Campbell was elected to the Hockey Hall of Fame in 1966. He was instrumental in the 1967 expansion, which doubled the league in size. He kept the league alive when the World Hockey Association raided its talent in the 1970s, and often worked 18 hours a day in his office.

At the beginning of the league's expansion era in 1967, the NHL clubs decided to highlight the achievements of the league president by donating the Clarence S. Campbell Bowl in his honour. When the league realigned into two conferences and four divisions in 1974, it further honoured Campbell by naming one of the two conferences after him, and awarding the Campbell Bowl to the conference's regular-season (later playoff) champion. Although the Clarence Campbell Conference was renamed the Western Conference in 1993, the Campbell Bowl continues to be awarded to the conference's playoff champion.

=== John Ziegler (1977–1992) ===
In 1977, John Ziegler became the fourth president of the NHL, succeeding Campbell. It was under Ziegler's watch that the WHA disbanded in 1979, and the NHL absorbed four of its teams (the Edmonton Oilers, Quebec Nordiques, Hartford Whalers, and original Winnipeg Jets), and near the end of his tenure in 1991, the San Jose Sharks began play, returning the NHL to the Bay Area for the first time since 1975.

Also under Ziegler's watch, NHL headquarters were moved from Montreal to New York City.

In 1987, Rendez-vous '87, a series between the Soviet national team and a team of stars from the NHL, was held in Quebec City. The two teams split the two-game series, and propelled an influx of Soviet players being drafted into the NHL by the end of the 1980s.

The first league-wide labor dispute occurred under Ziegler toward the end of the 1991–92 season. Ziegler was forced out of office by the owners as a result of the settlement that resolved the ten-day strike.

=== Gil Stein (1992–1993) ===
On June 22, 1992, Gil Stein was announced as the new president of the league and formally took the position, succeeding Ziegler. Ziegler had been forced out by owners dissatisfied with his agreement with the NHLPA, that ended a ten-day strike initiated by Bob Goodenow.

As president, Stein greatly expanded the visibility of the president's office during his term, often seen at games and being frequently interviewed on air and in print. Among his early actions after becoming president was a shake-up of league officers, ousting several vice-presidents, including Brian O'Neill, who had been the league's disciplinarian under Ziegler. Stein personally took over responsibility for league discipline, making it mandatory that suspended players pay their fines. He also implemented a policy of suspending players from practices on non-game days, instead of having them miss games. He advocated the use of NHL players at the 1994 Winter Olympics, but ran into opposition on the issue from team owners, however, his successor, Gary Bettman was able to get NHL players to compete in the Winter Olympics beginning in 1998, and the league would take a break during years when the Winter Olympics were held until 2018. Stein oversaw a further expansion of the NHL, in that the Tampa Bay Lightning and the new Ottawa Senators began play in the fall of 1992.

The league hired an executive search firm to help select someone for their newly created office of commissioner, at the same time that Stein's appointment as president was announced. Before the end of 1992, NHL governors selected Gary Bettman to become the league's first commissioner, starting on February 1, 1993. Stein had been a finalist for the job, but bowed out to avoid an internecine battle, and threw his support to Bettman.

When Stein's term ended on July 1, 1993, the presidency was abolished and its duties were conferred onto the commissioner.

== NHL commissioners (1993–present) ==
=== Gary Bettman (1993–present) ===
On February 1, 1993, Gary Bettman's tenure as the first commissioner of the National Hockey League began. The owners hired Bettman with the mandate of selling the game in the U.S. markets, ending labour unrest, completing expansion plans, and modernizing the views of the "old-guard" within the ownership ranks.

==== Expansion and relocation ====
When Bettman started as commissioner, the league had already expanded by three teams to 24 since 1991, and two more were set to be announced by the expansion committee: the Florida Panthers and Mighty Ducks of Anaheim, who would begin play in 1993–94. Similar to the previous expansion cycles, the focus was on placing teams in the southern United States. The Nashville Predators (1998), Atlanta Thrashers (1999), Minnesota Wild (2000), Columbus Blue Jackets (2000), Vegas Golden Knights (2017) and the Seattle Kraken (2021) have been added during Bettman's tenure. In addition, five franchises have relocated during Bettman's tenure – the Minnesota North Stars to Dallas (1993), the Quebec Nordiques to Denver (1995), the original Winnipeg Jets to Phoenix (1996), the Hartford Whalers to North Carolina (1997) and the Atlanta Thrashers to Winnipeg (2011), while the Arizona Coyotes suspended operations in 2024 and a new team in Salt Lake City was established.

Led by Bettman, the league focused expansion and relocation efforts on the American South, working to expand the league's footprint across the country. As a result, there has been significant growth in the sport of hockey at the grassroots level with children in the U.S. South playing the game in increasing numbers. The move towards southern markets has been heavily criticized as well, however, with fans in Canada and the Northern United States lamenting the move away from "traditional hockey markets."

Bettman has also been accused of having an "anti-Canadian" agenda, with critics citing the relocation of the franchises in Quebec City and Winnipeg and his apparent refusal to help stop it, along with the aborted sale of the Nashville Predators in 2007 to interests that would have moved the team to Hamilton, Ontario. Jim Balsillie accused Bettman of forcing the Predators to end negotiations with him to purchase the team. Bettman was satirized in this vein as the character "Harry Buttman" in the 2006 Canadian movie Bon Cop, Bad Cop.

==== Labour unrest ====
Although Bettman was tasked with putting an end to the NHL's labour problems, the league has nonetheless locked out its players three times during Bettman's tenure. The 1994–95 lockout lasted 104 days, causing the season to be shortened from 84 to 48 games. A key issue during the lockout was the desire to aid small market teams. Led by Bettman, the owners insisted on a salary cap, changes to free agency and arbitration in the hopes of limiting escalating salaries, the union instead proposed a luxury tax system. The negotiations were at times bitter, with Chris Chelios famously issuing a veiled threat against Bettman, suggesting that Bettman should be "worried about [his] family and [his] well-being", because "Some crazed fans, or even a player [...] might take matters into their own hands and figure they get Bettman out of the way."

By the end of the deal in 2004, the owners were claiming that player salaries had grown far faster than revenues, and that the league as a whole lost over US$300 million in 2002–03.

As a result, on September 15, 2004, Bettman announced that the owners again locked the players out prior to the start of the 2004–05 season. Five months later, Bettman announced the cancellation of the entire season with the words "It is my sad duty to announce that because a solution has not yet been attained, it is no longer practical to conduct even an abbreviated season. Accordingly, I have no choice but to announce the formal cancellation of play for 2004–2005." The NHL became the first North American league to cancel an entire season because of a labour stoppage.

As in 1994, the owners' position was predicated around the need for a salary cap. In an effort to ensure solidarity amongst the owners, the league's governors voted to give Bettman the right to unilaterally veto any union offer as long as he had the backing of just eight owners. The players initially favoured a luxury tax system, and a 5% rollback on player salaries — later increased to 24%. As the threat of another season being canceled loomed, the players agreed to accept a salary cap.

==== Television ====
Bettman quickly accomplished one of his stated goals, signing a five-year, $155 million deal with the Fox Broadcasting Company to broadcast NHL games nationally beginning in the 1994–95 season. The deal was significant, as a network television contract in the United States was long thought unattainable during the presidency of John Ziegler. The Fox deal is perhaps best remembered for the FoxTrax puck, which while generally popular according to Fox Sports, generated a great deal of controversy from longtime fans of the game.

Canadians were also upset as the league gave preference to Fox ahead of CBC for scheduling of playoff games, as Pat Hickey of the Montreal Gazette wrote that the schedule was "just another example of how the NHL snubs its nose at the country that invented hockey and its fans." The controversy repeated itself in 2007, as the CBC was once again given second billing to Versus' coverage of the playoffs.

Despite falling ratings, Bettman negotiated a five-year, $600 million deal with ABC and ESPN in 1998. It was the largest television contract the NHL ever signed. The $120 million per year that ABC and ESPN paid for rights dwarfed the $5.5 million that the NHL received from American national broadcasts in 1991–92.

The NHL's television fortunes have faded since the ABC deal, however. In 2004, the league could only manage a revenue sharing deal with NBC, with no money paid up front by the network. Also, coming out of the lockout, ESPN declined its $60 million option for the NHL's cable rights in 2005–06. While wishing to retain the NHL, it stated the cost was overvalued. However, Bettman was able to negotiate a deal with Comcast to air the NHL on the Outdoor Life Network, which changed its name to Versus to reflect their increasing live sports coverage, and was once again renamed to NBC Sports Network as a result of Comcast acquiring a majority of NBCUniversal. The three-year deal was worth $207.5 million. Bettman has been heavily criticized for the move to OLN/Versus/NBC Sports, as detractors have argued that the league has lost a great deal of exposure since moving to the much smaller network, which is often relegated to higher or specialty tiers on cable systems. In 2011, the NHL and NBC announced a 10-year, $2 billion contract.

On November 26, 2013, Bettman and NHL announced that it had sold twelve seasons' worth of exclusive Canadian national broadcast rights to Rogers Media, who would broadcast games across its numerous platforms, including Sportsnet, Sportsnet One, and City, from at a price of C$5.2 billion. Hockey Night in Canada would continue on the CBC for the next four seasons, but under a sub-licensing deal the public broadcaster would give Rogers free airtime to air the broadcasts. CBC would be allotted time during the broadcasts to promote its other programming. These moves left Bell Media and its TSN networks shut out of NHL broadcasts except for its regional properties.

== List of presidents/commissioners ==
Overview of NHL heads
Image	Holder	Start	End	Title
	Frank Calder	1917	1943	Presidents (1917–1993)
	Red Dutton	1943	1946	Presidents (1917–1993)
	Clarence Campbell	1946	1977	Presidents (1917–1993)
	John Ziegler Jr.	1977	1992	Presidents (1917–1993)
	Gil Stein	1992	1993	Presidents (1917–1993)
	Gary Bettman	1993		Commissioners (1993–present)

== See also ==
Commissioners of major professional sports leagues in the United States and Canada:

- Commissioner of Baseball
- Commissioner of the NBA
- Commissioner of the NFL
