= Gil Stein (ice hockey) =

American lawyer and ice hockey executive (1928–2022)

- Gil Stein

5th President of the National Hockey League
- In office June 22, 1992 – July 1, 1993
- Preceded by: John Ziegler Jr.
- Succeeded by: Gary Bettman (as Commissioner)

Personal details
- Born: Gilbert Stein; January 11, 1928 Philadelphia, Pennsylvania, U.S.
- Died: March 24, 2022 (aged 94) Wynnewood, Pennsylvania, U.S.
- Education: Temple University (BA); Boston University (JD)
- Profession: Attorney

Gilbert Stein (January 11, 1928 – March 24, 2022) was an American lawyer, law instructor, and professional ice hockey executive. Stein served with the National Hockey League (NHL) as vice president and legal counsel for nearly 15 years before serving as the fifth and last president of the NHL from 1992 to 1993.

== Early life and career ==
Born in Philadelphia on January 11, 1928, Stein attended Temple University and studied law at Boston University. Before joining the NHL, Stein was Deputy District Attorney for Philadelphia, then worked for the Philadelphia Housing Authority and Labor Relations Board. After leaving the public sector, he joined a law firm, and then was hired by the Philadelphia Flyers where he served as chief operating officer and executive vice president.

== NHL ==
He served as the National Hockey League's (NHL) general counsel and vice president under John Ziegler, Jr., and held that role for 4 years. In 1982, he appeared before a United States Senate committee to discuss retransmission of television signals by cable operators.

After the owners disliked the way that Ziegler handled the 1991–92 NHL strike, they desired to abolish the position of president in favor of having a commissioner. He was appointed as interim president on June 22, 1992, and became full president on September 30. After taking over from Ziegler, Stein fired Brian O'Neill, the longtime overseer of league discipline, and took over the position himself. Stein then instituted a policy of suspending players on non-game days (such as practice) rather than games for violent actions. Stein also attempted to block O'Neill's Hall of Fame candidacy by removing him from the board of members for the Hall (O'Neil was later elected in 1994).

Stein also supported having NHL players in the 1994 Winter Olympics as a way to grow NHL support in Europe. Two expansion teams came in the Mighty Ducks of Anaheim and Florida Panthers during his tenure. The Panthers' creation attracted the ire of Phil Esposito, president and general manager of the young Tampa Bay Lightning, who began play one year before Florida in 1992. Stein had initially promised Esposito that no new teams would be added until 1996 to give the Lightning time to develop a fanbase in the state of Florida. Esposito criticized Stein for going after expansion fees without regard to the long-term implications of franchise stability.

Stein served as NHL president for a year until shortly after the owners appointed Gary Bettman to the newly created post of commissioner. Bettman took office on February 1, 1993; Stein served alongside Bettman until his term as president ended on July 1, 1993. He was then appointed a special advisor to Bettman. In 1993, Stein was awarded the Lester Patrick Trophy for outstanding service to hockey in the United States.

Stein was behind the Hall of Fame board while president, spearheading a change in the voting process by simple majority with no secret ballots. Stein was selected as the first member of this policy to the Hall of Fame, which attracted allegations that he manipulated his induction. According to SB Nation, Stein removed three board members and appointed five new ones, then had Board of Governors chairman Bruce McNall (a close friend of Stein) make the case for his enshrinement. The Hall of Fame board did not speak with either the full Board of Governors or Bettman. Amid fierce criticism, Bettman had outside lawyers conduct an investigation into the process. The investigation revealed that Stein had "improperly manipulated the process" to make it appear that McNall had nominated Stein. In truth, Stein had pressured McNall to nominate him, and refused to stand down even after Bettman made three requests that he withdraw his nomination. The lawyers recommended that Stein's election be rescinded. Long before then, however, Stein realized his position was untenable and decided not to accept induction even if the investigation cleared him.

== Personal life ==
Stein was married to Barbara and they had three children. In his later years, he lived in an assisted living community in Gladwyne, Pennsylvania. Stein died from heart disease on March 24, 2022, at the age of 94.

Sporting positions
Preceded by John Ziegler	National Hockey League President; 1992–1993	Succeeded by Gary Bettman as Commissioner of the National Hockey League
