= Gary Bettman =

American sports executive (born 1952)

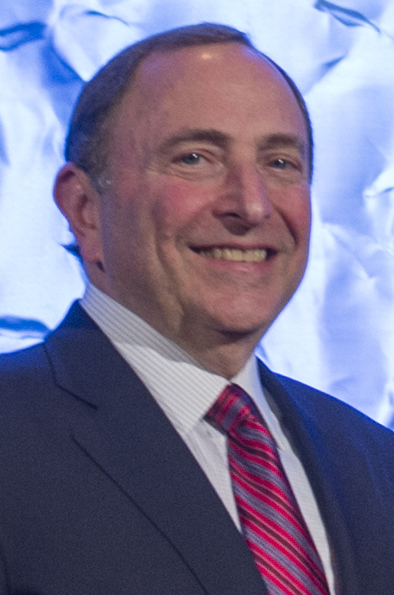
- Bettman in November 2016

1st Commissioner of the National Hockey League
- Incumbent
- Assumed office February 1, 1993
- Preceded by: Gil Stein (as President)

Personal details
- Born: Gary Bruce Bettman; June 2, 1952 (age 74) Queens, New York, U.S.
- Spouse: Shelli Bettman (m. 1976)
- Children: 3
- Relatives: Jeffrey Pollack (half-brother)
- Education: Cornell University (BA); New York University (JD)
- Awards: Hockey Hall of Fame (2018)

Gary Bruce Bettman (born June 2, 1952) is an American sports executive who serves as the commissioner of the National Hockey League (NHL), a post he has held since February 1, 1993. Previously, Bettman was a senior vice president and general counsel to the National Basketball Association (NBA). Bettman is a graduate of Cornell University and New York University School of Law. Bettman was elected to the Hockey Hall of Fame in 2018.

He oversaw the expansion of the NHL's footprint across the United States, with eight new teams added during his tenure, bringing the NHL to 32 teams since the start of the 2021–22 season. In May 2014, Bettman was named "sports executive of the year" by the SportsBusiness Journal and SportsBusiness Daily. In 2016, Bettman was inducted as a member of the International Jewish Sports Hall of Fame.

Bettman's tenure in the NHL has been controversial. He has often been criticized for attempting to give the game a mass appeal, and for expanding the league into non-traditional hockey markets such as the United States' Sun Belt at the expense of the more traditional markets in Canada and the Northern United States. Bettman has also been a central figure in three labor stoppages, including the 2004–05 NHL lockout that saw the entire season canceled. These controversies have made him unpopular with many fans around the league.

== Education and family ==
Bettman was born in Queens, New York. He studied industrial and labor relations at Cornell University in Ithaca, New York, where he was a brother of the Alpha Epsilon Pi fraternity, and graduated in 1974. After receiving a Juris Doctor degree from New York University School of Law in 1977, Bettman joined the New York City law firm of Proskauer Rose Goetz & Mendelsohn.

Bettman lives with his wife, Shelli, and their three children Lauren, Jordan, and Brittany. He is a resident of Saddle River, New Jersey. His half-brother Jeffrey Pollack is also a sports executive and served as President of the XFL from 2018 to 2021.

== NBA ==
Bettman joined the National Basketball Association (NBA) in 1981, serving mainly in the marketing and legal departments. Bettman rose to third in command of the NBA, spending many years as the league's general counsel and senior vice president. Bettman played a key role in the development of the soft salary cap system implemented and agreed by the NBA in 1983, a system it continues to use today.

== NHL commissioner ==
On December 12, 1992, Bettman was elected as the first commissioner of the National Hockey League (NHL). He took office on February 1, 1993; until July 1 he served alongside Gil Stein, who served as the NHL's final president. The owners hired Bettman with the mandate of selling the game in the U.S. market, ending labor unrest, completing expansion plans, and modernizing the views of the "old guard" within the ownership ranks.

=== Expansion, relocation and realignment ===
When Bettman started as commissioner, the league had already expanded by three teams to 24 starting with the 1991–92 season, and two more were set to be announced by the expansion committee: the Florida Panthers and Mighty Ducks of Anaheim, who would begin play in 1993–94. Led by Bettman, the league focused expansion and relocation efforts during the rest of the 1990s on nontraditional hockey markets, working to expand the league's footprint across the country. The Nashville Predators (1998), Atlanta Thrashers (1999), Minnesota Wild (2000), and Columbus Blue Jackets (2000) completed this expansion period, bringing the NHL to 30 teams. In addition, four franchises relocated during the 1990s under Bettman: The Minnesota North Stars to Dallas (1993), the Quebec Nordiques to Denver (1995), the original Winnipeg Jets to Phoenix (1996), and the Hartford Whalers to North Carolina (1997).

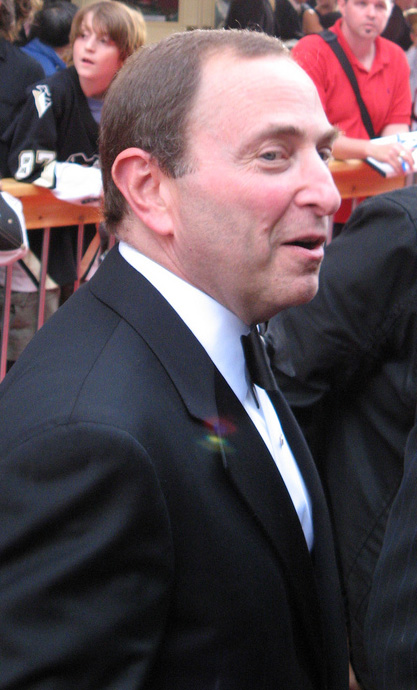
Bettman at the 2007 NHL Awards

This move towards southern markets was heavily criticized as well, however, with fans in Canada and the Northern United States lamenting the move away from "traditional hockey markets". Critics have also accused Bettman of having an "anti-Canadian" agenda, citing the relocation of the franchises in Quebec City and Winnipeg and his apparent refusal to help stop it, along with the aborted sale of the Nashville Predators in 2007 to interests that would have moved the team to Hamilton, Ontario. Jim Balsillie accused Bettman of forcing the Predators to end negotiations with him to purchase the team. Bettman was satirized in this vein as the character "Harry Buttman" in the 2006 Canadian movie Bon Cop, Bad Cop.

However, Bettman also championed the Canadian assistance plan, a revenue sharing agreement that saw American teams give money to help support the four small-market Canadian teams—Calgary, Edmonton, Ottawa, and Vancouver—throughout the late 1990s and early 2000s.

The results of expanding to southern markets has been mixed. There has been significant growth in the sport of hockey at the grassroots level with children in the Sun Belt playing the game in increasing numbers.

However, some of these southern teams have not been financially successful. The Phoenix Coyotes eventually filed for bankruptcy in May 2009, after incurring several hundred million dollars of losses since their 1996 move from Winnipeg. Under Bettman, the league then took control over the team later that year in order to stabilize the club's operations and then resell it to a new owner who would be committed to stay in the Phoenix market. It took several years for the League to find a viable ownership group, even then the new ownership group was unable to secure a new arena for the team in the 2020s and they relocated to Salt Lake City in 2024.

After joining the league in 1999, the Atlanta Thrashers suffered financial losses and ownership struggles, while appearing in the playoffs only one time. In 2011 they were sold to True North Sports and Entertainment, who then relocated the team to Winnipeg, a stark reversal of the league's attempts to expand into the southern markets.

During the late 1990s round of expansion, the league revised its four-division alignment into one containing six divisions that eventually each contained five teams. At the time, seventeen of the league's thirty teams were based in the Eastern Time Zone, meaning that the two westernmost such teams (Detroit Red Wings and Columbus Blue Jackets) were compelled to compete in the Western Conference, which gave a large proportion of their road games an unfavorably late start on local television. There were other grievances with the alignment—for example, the Dallas Stars, being in the Central Time Zone, were not pleased to be in the same division as the Coyotes and the three Californian teams.

Detroit and Columbus were fierce opponents of Balsillie's bids for a team in Hamilton (proposals which would have seen another team added to the Eastern Time Zone) but also strong backers of Winnipeg's bid for the Thrashers, largely since this took the franchise out of the Eastern Time Zone and thus provided them a path to be realigned into the Eastern Conference. Following intense negotiations brokered by Bettman among the owners and with the players, the NHL reverted to a four-division alignment in time for the 2013–14 season, with two divisions of seven teams each for the West and two divisions containing the sixteen remaining Eastern Time Zone teams for the East.

An expansion occurred in the summer of 2017, with Las Vegas, Nevada, gaining the league's 31st team, the Vegas Golden Knights. Bettman later explained that the NHL's new divisional alignment precluded the adding of more franchises in the Eastern Time Zone, at least for the time being.

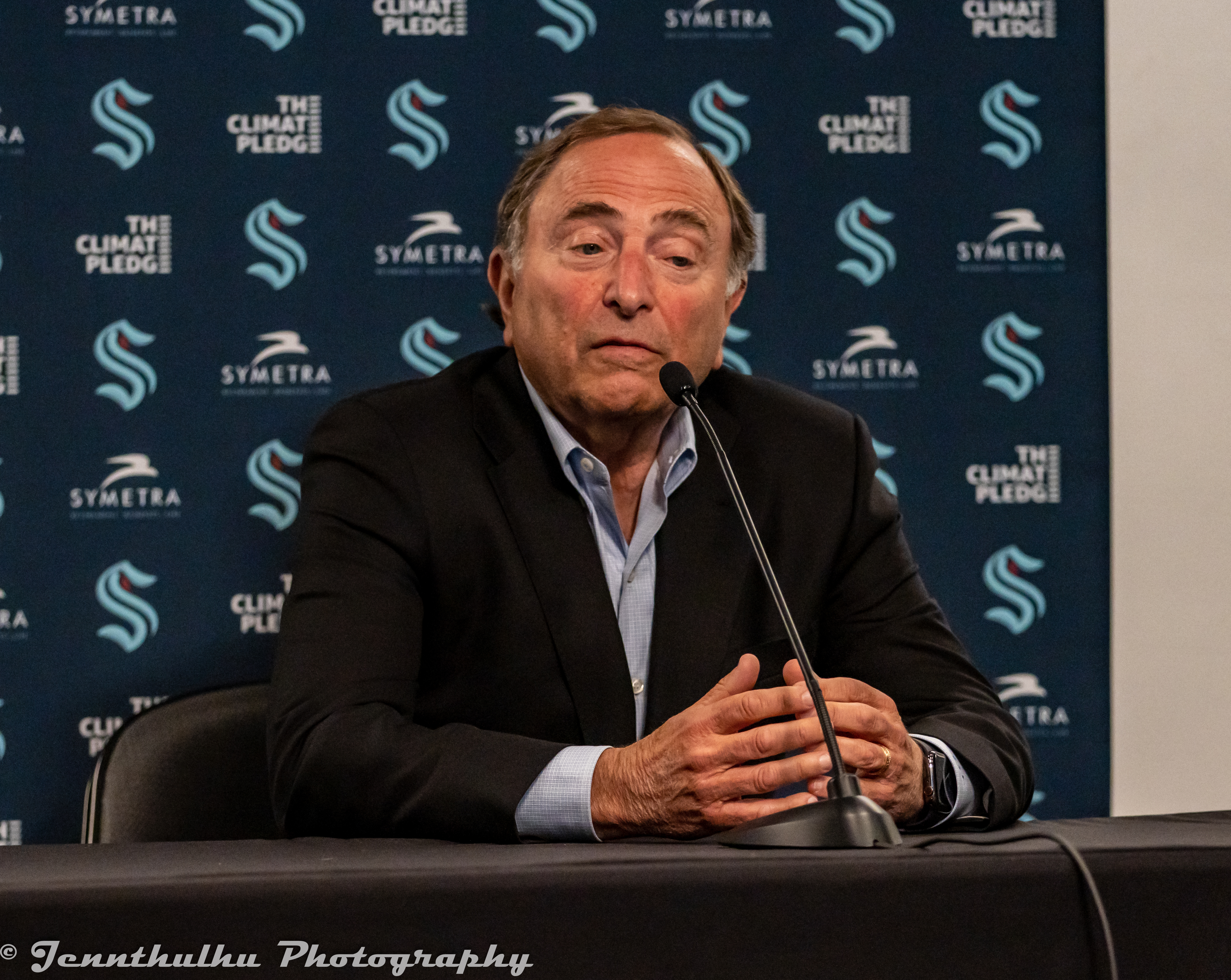
Bettman in March 2023

The most recent expansion occurred on December 4, 2018, with the announcement that Seattle would be the league's 32nd team. The Seattle Kraken started in the 2021–22 NHL season. Bettman chose Seattle as it is one of the fastest growing cities.

=== Labor unrest ===
Although Bettman was tasked with putting an end to the NHL's labor problems, the league has locked out its players three times during Bettman's tenure.

==== 1994–95 lockout ====
The 1994–95 lockout lasted 104 days, causing the season to be shortened from 84 to 48 games. A key issue during the lockout was the desire to aid small-market teams. Led by Bettman, the owners insisted on a salary cap, changes to free agency, and arbitration in the hopes of limiting escalating salaries. The union instead proposed a luxury tax system. The negotiations were at times bitter, with Chris Chelios famously issuing a veiled threat against Bettman, suggesting that Bettman should be "worried about [his] family and [his] well-being", because "Some crazed fans, or even a player [...] might take matters into their own hands and figure they get Bettman out of the way."

Last-ditch negotiations saved the season in January 1995. And while the owners failed to achieve a full salary cap, the union agreed to a cap on rookie contracts, changes to arbitration, and restrictive rules for free agency that would not grant a player unrestricted free agency until he turned 31. The deal was initially hailed as a win for the owners.

==== 2004–05 lockout ====
By the end of the deal in 2004, the owners were claiming that player salaries had grown far faster than revenues, and that the league as a whole lost over US$300 million in 2002–03.

As a result, on September 15, 2004, Bettman announced that the owners again locked the players out prior to the start of the 2004–05 season. Five months later, Bettman announced the cancellation of the entire season:

"It is my sad duty to announce that because a solution has not yet been attained, it is no longer practical to conduct even an abbreviated season. Accordingly, I have no choice but to announce the formal cancellation of play."

The NHL therefore became the first North American professional sports league to cancel an entire season because of a labor stoppage, and the second league to cancel a postseason (the first being Major League Baseball, which lost its postseason in 1994 due to a strike).

As in 1994, the owners' position was predicated around the need for a salary cap. In an effort to ensure solidarity amongst the owners, the league's governors voted to give Bettman the right to unilaterally veto any union offer as long as he had the backing of just eight owners. The players initially favored a luxury tax system, and a 5% rollback on player salaries—later increased to 24 percent. As the threat of a canceled season loomed, the players agreed to accept a salary cap, but the two sides could not come to terms on numbers before the deadline expired.

Following the cancellation of the season, negotiations progressed quickly, as a revolt within the union led to National Hockey League Players' Association president Trevor Linden and senior director Ted Saskin taking negotiations over from executive director Bob Goodenow. Goodenow would resign from the NHLPA in July 2005. By early July, the two sides had agreed to a new collective bargaining agreement. The deal featured a hard salary cap, linked to a fixed percentage of league revenues, a 24% rollback on salaries, and free agency beginning after seven years of service. After being panned as one of the worst managers in business in 2004 for canceling the season, Bettman was lauded as one of the best in 2005 for his role in bringing "cost certainty" to the NHL.

==== 2012–13 lockout ====
The 2012–13 NHL lockout lasted from September 15, 2012, to January 19, 2013, after the owners and players failed to agree on a new collective bargaining agreement. The owners' original offer retained the framework established following the 2004–05 NHL lockout but made numerous changes to player salary and movement rights, including reducing the players' share of hockey-related revenues from 57 percent to 46 percent, introducing term limits on contracts, eliminating salary arbitration, and changing free agency rules. As the deadline for a work stoppage approached, the union unsuccessfully challenged the league's ability to lock out players of the Calgary Flames and Edmonton Oilers (appealing to the Alberta Labour Relations Board), and the Montreal Canadiens (appealing to the Quebec Labour Relations Board).

After unsuccessful negotiations, the NHL and NHLPA agreed to mediation under the auspices of the Federal Mediation and Conciliation Service on November 26. The sides met with mediators on November 28 and 29, but the mediators quit after that point, determining they could not make any progress reconciling the two parties' demands, and thus both sides were on their own again. After talks broke down again in December, rumors leaked that the NHLPA planned on filing a "disclaimer of interest" (a quicker, less formal way to dissolve the players' union, compared with decertification) and, with collective bargaining no longer in effect, pursuing an antitrust lawsuit against the NHL. The NHL responded on December 14 by filing a class action suit with the U.S. District Court in New York seeking to establish that its lockout was legal. Included in the lawsuit was a request for all existing player contracts to be "void and unenforceable", should the NHLPA be dissolved, resulting in all NHL players becoming free agents. The league also filed an unfair labor practice charge with the National Labor Relations Board, stating that the union had been negotiating in bad faith and that its threat to disclaim interest was a negotiating ploy that violated the collective bargaining process. In a vote conducted from December 17 to 21, the players authorized the union's executive board to file a disclaimer of interest until January 2, 2013, though it did not proceed with the filing.

On January 6, 2013, a tentative deal was reached on a new collective bargaining agreement to end the lockout. The terms included a limit of eight years on contract extensions and seven years on new contracts, a salary floor of US$44 million and a salary cap of US$60 million (a two-year transition period allowed teams to spend up to US$70.2 million in the deal's first season, prorated for the season length, and up to a salary cap of US$64.3 million in the second season), a maximum 50-percent variance in the salaries over the course of a contract, mandatory acceptance of arbitration awards under US$3.5 million, no realignment, and an amnesty period to buy out contracts that did not fit under the salary cap. After the union ratified the deal, the lockout ended.

A 48-game regular season schedule was then played, starting on January 19, 2013, and ending on April 28, 2013, with no inter-conference games. Despite the lockout, the average attendance for the season was 17,768, up 2.6 percent from the previous year, while TV ratings in both Canada and the United States also increased.

=== Digital media ===
==== Television ====
Bettman quickly accomplished one of his stated goals, signing a five-year, $155 million deal with the Fox Broadcasting Company to broadcast NHL games nationally in the U.S. beginning in the 1994–95 season. The deal was significant, as a network television contract in the United States was long thought unattainable during the presidency of John Ziegler. The Fox deal is perhaps best remembered for the FoxTrax puck, which while generally popular according to Fox Sports, generated a great deal of controversy from longtime fans of the game.

Canadians were also upset as the league gave preference to Fox ahead of CBC for scheduling of playoff games, as Pat Hickey of the Montreal Gazette wrote that the schedule was "just another example of how the N.H.L. snubs its nose at the country that invented hockey and its fans." The controversy repeated itself in 2007, as CBC was once again given second billing to Versus's coverage of the playoffs.

Despite falling ratings, Bettman negotiated a five-year, $600 million deal with ABC and ESPN in 1998. It was the largest television contract the NHL ever signed. The $120 million per year that ABC and ESPN paid for rights dwarfed the $5.5 million that the NHL received from American national broadcasts in 1991–92.

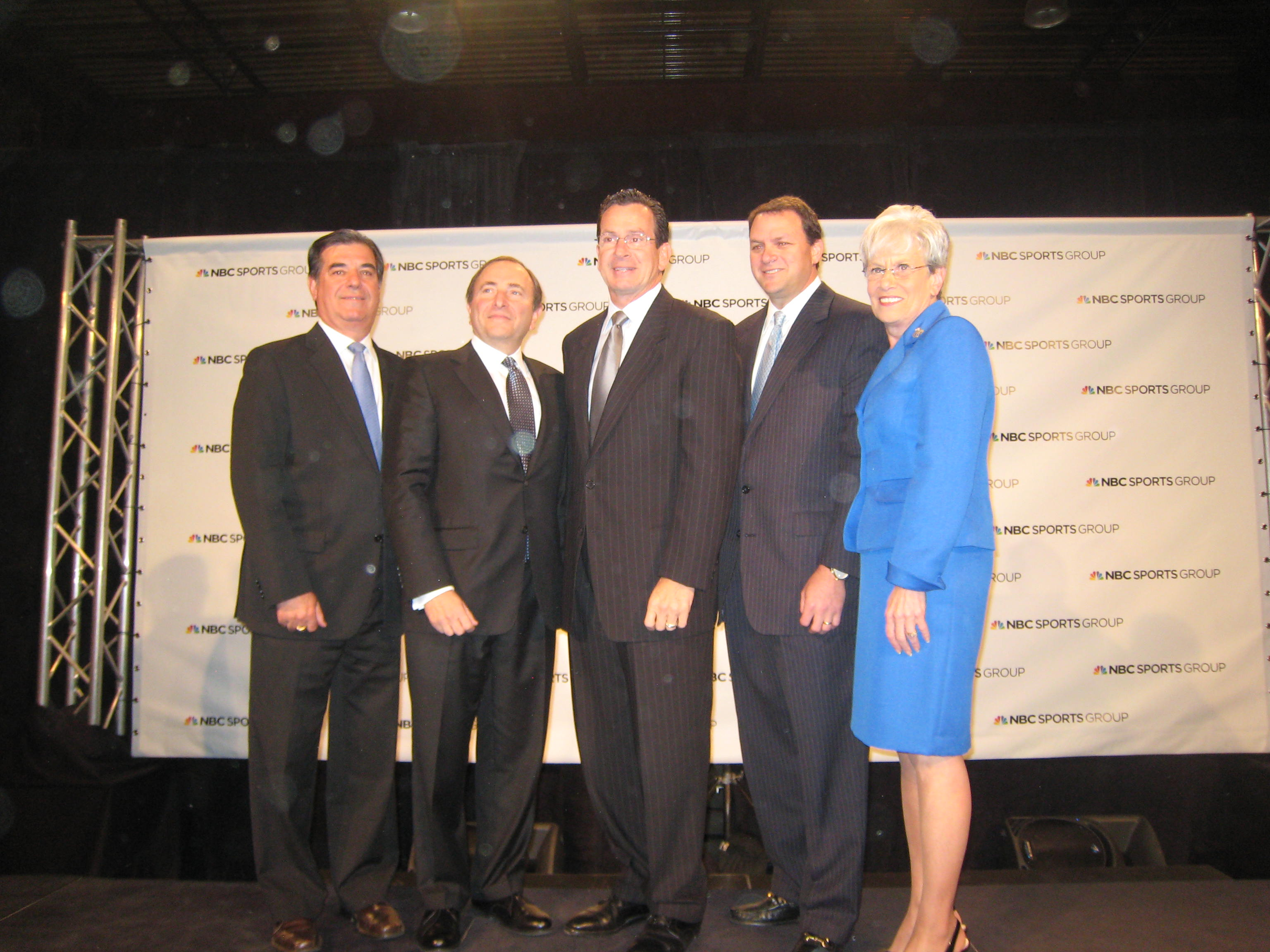
Bettman (second-left foreground) with Governor Dannel Malloy and several NBC Sports Group executives, during a news conference to announce NBC's consolidation of operations in Connecticut.

The NHL's television fortunes faded after the ABC/ESPN deal. In 2004, the league could manage a revenue sharing deal with only NBC, with no money paid up front by the network. Also, coming out of the lockout, ESPN declined its $60 million option for the NHL's cable rights in 2005–06. While wishing to retain the NHL, it stated the cost was overvalued. However, Bettman was able to negotiate a deal with Comcast to air the NHL on the Outdoor Life Network channel, which was later renamed Versus in 2006. The three-year deal was worth $207.5 million. Bettman was heavily criticized for the move to Versus, as detractors argued that the league lost a great deal of exposure since moving to the much smaller network. The TV deal with Versus was later extended through the 2010–11 season.

In January 2011, Comcast acquired NBC Universal, and then in April of that year Bettman negotiated a new 10-year deal with the merged media company, worth nearly $2 billion. Comcast/NBC also announced that both Versus and NBC would increase their number of games. In signing this new TV deal, Bettman rejected offers from ESPN and others. Reaction to this new TV deal was mixed, noting that the NHL still lacked the exposure that ESPN could provide, while at the same time acknowledging that ESPN might not devote as much attention and promotion as Comcast/NBC would since the former was committed to various other sports properties. Comcast/NBC then renamed Versus as the NBC Sports Network on January 2, 2012.

On November 26, 2013, Bettman announced that the NHL had sold twelve seasons' worth of exclusive Canadian national broadcast rights to Rogers Media, who would broadcast games across its numerous platforms, including Sportsnet, Sportsnet One, and City, at a price of CAD$5.2 billion. Hockey Night in Canada would continue on the CBC for the next four seasons, but under a sub-licensing deal the public broadcaster would give Rogers free airtime to air the broadcasts. CBC would be allotted time during the broadcasts to promote its other programming. These moves left Bell Media and its TSN networks shut out of NHL broadcasts except for its regional properties.

==== XM Satellite Radio ====
Bettman hosts an hour-long weekly radio show on NHL Home Ice (XM 204). The show provides fans with an opportunity to speak directly with the commissioner and voice any questions, comments, or concerns related to ice hockey.

=== NHL at the Olympic Games ===
The NHL first participated in ice hockey at the Olympic Games in the 1998 tournament in Nagano. The hockey tournament has since become one of the biggest and most profitable events at the Olympics. Bettman spoke at the World Hockey Summit in 2010, and stated that being in the Olympics was a "mixed bag" for the NHL, and its experiences outside of North America tended not to be positive. He gave a list of issues that he wanted to see resolved in consultation with the National Hockey League Players' Association, which included more control over marketing and promotion, timing of games being televised in North America, the hiatus in the NHL regular season schedule, ability for NHL team executives to access their players, travel concerns, and risk of injuries. The NHL had planned to return to the Olympics during the 2022 tournament in Beijing, however due to the COVID-19 pandemic, the league pulled out and returned during the 2026 tournament in Milan instead.

=== President's Council on Sports, Fitness, and Nutrition ===
In August 2025, Bettman was named to the President's Council on Sports, Fitness, and Nutrition alongside other NHL representatives such as NHL legend and Canadian Wayne Gretzky and Panthers player Matthew Tkachuk, and representatives of other sports. The council is designed to help provide advice to the president on strategies and opportunities to expand participation in sports and physical fitness, with members serving two-year terms.

=== Salary ===
For the lockout-shortened 2012–13 season, Bettman received $8.8 million in total compensation by the NHL. By 2013–14, his salary had increased to $9.5 million, according to the NHL's filings with the Internal Revenue Service.

For the 2008–09 season, Bettman was paid $7.23 million, of which $5,529,490 was his base salary. It was $3.77 million prior to the 2004–05 lockout.

=== Public perception ===
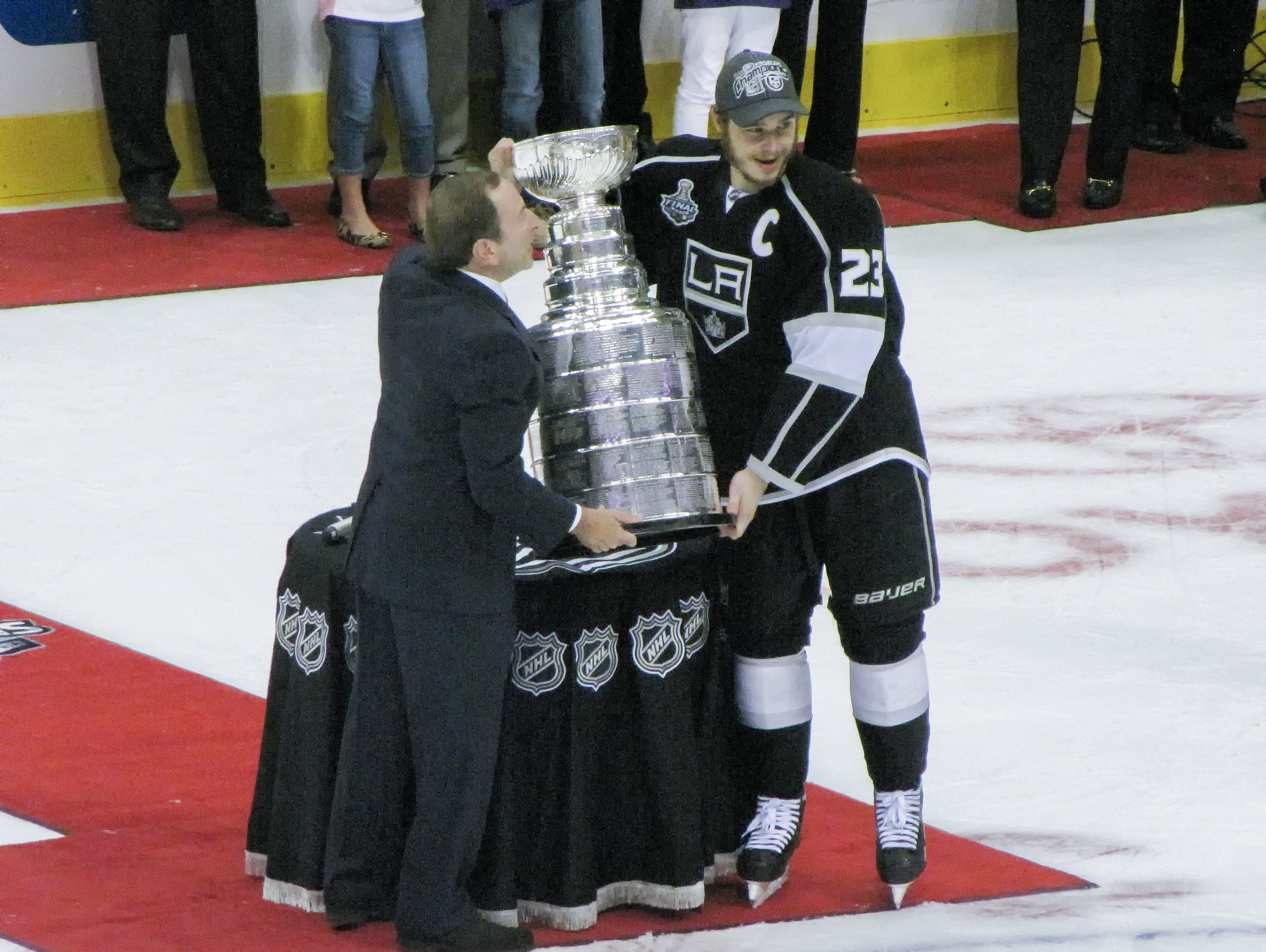
Bettman presents the Stanley Cup to Dustin Brown at the end of the 2012 Stanley Cup Final

Bettman's controversial decisions, as well as presiding over three labor stoppages, have made him unpopular among many NHL fans. He is regularly booed in various arenas around the league, ranging from his appearances at the yearly NHL entry draft to his annual presentation of the Stanley Cup to the league champions at the end of the playoffs. When asked if the booing ever bothers him, Bettman said, "Not doing this job, no. You're always going to have critics. What I've always told people: If I take the ice and it's completely silent, then I'll know I'm in trouble."

In another interview, he replied that he says to himself, "You know what, [the fans] got an opinion. We may not agree on everything, but they care, and I'll take that." Still, writers such as Adam Proteau of The Hockey News and James O'Brien of NBC Sports' Pro Hockey Talk have advocated that someone else should hand out the Cup instead of Bettman so that the incessant booing does not spoil the ceremony. In 2013, the sports blog Grantland stated that Bettman's Cup presentations have "evolved into one of the most awkward traditions in all of sports".

Playing upon those perceptions, 2006 Canadian movie Bon Cop, Bad Cop cast Rick Howland as "Harry Buttman", a Gary Bettman parody, a hockey league commissioner who wants to move Montreal's hockey team to Houston.

In April 2017, Bettman announced that the NHL would not be taking part in the 2018 Winter Olympics, a decision that was confirmed in November 2017 and was widely unpopular among players. The NHL later would initially plan to return to the Olympics in 2022, but this was delayed due to concerns about COVID-19 restrictions and the return was pushed back to 2026.

In 2023, he was briefly portrayed by Canadian actor Mark Critch in the film Blackberry during the scene when Jim Balsillie unsuccessfully meets with the NHL to place a team in Hamilton, Ontario.

== Honors ==
On May 21, 2014, Bettman was named "Sports Executive of the Year" by the SportsBusiness Journal and SportsBusiness Daily at the publications' annual Sports Business Awards event in New York. At the same ceremony, the NHL was named "Sports League of the Year", the second time in four years the NHL had been so honored. The 2014 Bridgestone NHL Winter Classic was named "Sports Event of the Year". Bettman said, "It's almost an out-of-body experience. This time of year, I'm normally presenting a trophy and getting booed. To receive one and get applause is really quite novel."

CBS Sports hockey writer Chris Peters said, "There's no question the game has grown throughout the United States with participation in the sport at an all-time high, in addition to rising revenues for the NHL itself. The game is also reaching its best exposure through its TV deal with NBC Sports. That could be one of Bettman's crowning achievements. The remarkable thing about the NHL is that it remains incredibly strong, if not stronger coming out of two lockouts in the last decade. Gary Bettman…may not be perfect…but (he) is a good leader for the NHL and probably deserves some recognition for it."

In 2016, Bettman was inducted as a member of the International Jewish Sports Hall of Fame.

Following the retirements of David Stern on February 1, 2014, and Bud Selig on January 25, 2015, Bettman became the longest-serving active commissioner in professional sports.

In November 2018, he was inducted into the Hockey Hall of Fame.

In January 2023, Bettman was the recipient of SportsBusiness Journal's Lifetime Achievement award.

Sporting positions
| Preceded by Gil Stein as President of the National Hockey League | Commissioner of the National Hockey League; 1993–present | Incumbent |
