= History of the Los Angeles Angels =

The Los Angeles Angels are a professional baseball team based in Anaheim, California. The Angels compete in Major League Baseball (MLB) as a member club of the American League (AL) West division. The "Angels" name originates from the city that was their original home, Los Angeles, and was inspired by both California League and Pacific Coast League of the same name. The Angels were established in 1961 and have played their home games at Angel Stadium since 1966.

== Before the Angels (1940–1960) ==
For many years prior to the Angels' establishment, there had been talk of an existing American League team relocating to Los Angeles. In 1940, the St. Louis Browns asked AL owners for permission to move to Los Angeles, but were turned down. They planned another move for the 1942 season, and this time got permission from the league. A schedule was even drawn up including Los Angeles, but the bombing of Pearl Harbor in December 1941 made major-league sports of any sort on the West Coast unviable. In 1953, there was again talk of the Browns moving to Los Angeles for the 1954 season, but the team was sold and moved to Baltimore instead as the Orioles. There were on-again, off-again discussions between city officials and the Washington Senators regarding a possible move. There were also rumors that the Philadelphia Athletics' move to Kansas City in 1955 was a temporary stop on the way to Los Angeles.

Ultimately, it was the National League that first came to the city, in the form of the Brooklyn Dodgers. Dodgers owner Walter O'Malley purchased the Pacific Coast League's Los Angeles Angels in early 1957 from Chicago Cubs owner Phil Wrigley. Under the rules of the time, he also acquired the rights to a major league team in Los Angeles, which he used to move the Dodgers there a year later. Under ordinary circumstances, that would have precluded any subsequent American League presence in the Los Angeles area. However, in an effort to prevent the proposed Continental League from becoming a reality, in 1960 the two existing leagues agreed to expand, adding two teams to each league. The understanding that expansion teams would be placed in cities without major league baseball quickly broke down since efforts to create the Continental League were driven by parties interested in restoring National League baseball to New York. When the National League placed a team in New York City (the Mets) as its tenth franchise to begin play in 1962 (thus canceling the Contential League), the American League announced plans to place an expansion team in Los Angeles, to begin play in 1961.

== Formation of the Angels franchise (1960–1961) ==
Gene Autry, former movie cowboy, singer, actor and owner of Golden West Broadcasters (including Los Angeles' KMPC radio and KTLA television), attended the Major League Owners' meeting in St. Louis in 1960 in hopes of winning broadcasting rights for the new team's games. Hall of Famer Hank Greenberg was initially on the fast track to be the team's first owner, with Bill Veeck as a partner. However, when O'Malley got word of Veeck's involvement, he invoked his exclusive right to operate a major league team in Southern California. In truth, O'Malley was not about to compete with Veeck, who was known as a master promoter. After it became obvious that O'Malley would never sign off on the deal as long as Veeck was a part-owner, Greenberg was forced to bow out. After another bid by Chicago insurance executive and future A's owner Charlie Finley failed, Autry was persuaded make a bid himself. O'Malley quickly backed this bid, as he publicly considered Autry a friend but at the same time was privately dismissive of the potential sports business acumen of an owner who had made his fortune in show business. With O'Malley's blessing, Autry (who had been a minority stockholder in the Angels' PCL rival, the Hollywood Stars) purchased the franchise.

Autry named the new franchise the Los Angeles Angels. The origins of the name date back to 1892, when it was first used by a Los Angeles franchise in the California League. The Angel moniker has always been natural for Los Angeles teams, since The Angels is a literal English translation of the Spanish Los Angeles. It was also a nod to the long-successful PCL team that played in Los Angeles from 1903 through 1957. O'Malley still owned the rights to the Angels name even after moving the team to Spokane to make way for the Dodgers, so Autry paid O'Malley $300,000 for the rights to the name.

== First seasons in Los Angeles (1961–1965) ==
The Angels and their expansion brethren, the new Washington Senators (now the Texas Rangers) chose players from other American League teams in an expansion draft. In 1961, the first year of the team's existence, the Angels finished 70–91 for a .435 winning percentage, still the highest winning percentage ever for a first-year MLB expansion team. Moreover, they not only finished nine games ahead of the Senators, but also nine games ahead of the Kansas City Athletics. The 1961 Angels, admittedly a motley crew, featured portly first baseman Steve Bilko, a long-time fan favorite who played multiple years with the PCL Angels. Another favorite was the diminutive (5 ft 5 3/8 in, 1,661 mm) center fielder, El Monte native Albie Pearson. The Angels played that inaugural season at Wrigley Field in South Los Angeles, the longtime home of the PCL Angels and also of the syndicated television series Home Run Derby. They originally wanted to play at the Los Angeles Memorial Coliseum, where the Dodgers had played on a temporary basis since moving from Brooklyn. However, Commissioner Ford Frick turned this idea down almost out of hand after concluding that the Coliseum's extremely short left field fence (only 250 feet from the plate) made it unsuitable even as a temporary facility.

In 1962, under the terms of their agreement with O'Malley, the Angels moved to Dodger Stadium, which they referred to as Chavez Ravine during their tenure at that venue. That year, the Angels were a contender for the American League pennant for most of the season. They led the American League standings on July 4 before finishing in third place, ten games behind the New York Yankees, who won their 27th American League pennant. On May 5 of that year, Bo Belinsky, who was as famous for his dexterity with the pool cue and his dating of Hollywood starlets (most particularly Mamie Van Doren) as for his pitching prowess, tossed the first no-hit game in the history of Dodger Stadium/Chavez Ravine, blanking the Orioles 5–0. (Though raised in the Jewish faith, Belinsky later became a born-again Christian and counselor, advising against the lifestyle which once was his trademark.)

In 1964, the Angels again finished fifth in the American League, and pitcher Dean Chance won the Major League Cy Young Award that year. The need for a new stadium became more evident. It was believed that the Angels would never develop a large fan base while playing as tenants of the Dodgers. Also, O'Malley imposed fairly onerous lease conditions on the Angels; for example, he charged them for 50% of all stadium supplies, even though the Angels at the time drew at best half of the Dodgers' attendance.

== The move to Anaheim (1966–1971) ==
Stymied in his attempt to get a new stadium in Los Angeles, Autry looked elsewhere. His first choice for a stadium was the site offered by the city of Long Beach. However, the city insisted that the team be renamed the Long Beach Angels, a condition Autry refused to accept. He was able to strike a deal with the suburban city of Anaheim in Orange County, and construction began on Anaheim Stadium (nicknamed The Big A by Southern Californians), where the Angels moved in 1966. On September 2, 1965, team ownership announced the Los Angeles Angels would thenceforth be known as the California Angels, in anticipation of the team's move to Anaheim the following year. They were the second Major League baseball team to be named after an entire state, following the Minnesota Twins. At the time, though they were one of three major league teams in the state of California, the Angels were the only American League team in the state. (After the move of the Kansas City Athletics to Oakland in 1968 and the establishment of the San Diego Padres in 1969, the Angels retained their California moniker through 1996 despite any objections that other California teams may have had.) They were also the first Major League Baseball team established in California (the Dodgers and Giants were from New York, the A's came from Philadelphia via Kansas City, and the Padres would become the second team established in the state upon their addition in 1969).

In their last year at Chavez Ravine, the Angels drew only 566,727 paying customers. In their 1966 inaugural year in Anaheim, the Angels drew over 1.4 million, leading the American League in attendance. In 1967, their second year in Anaheim, the Angels contended for the American League pennant as part of a five-team pennant race (along with Chicago, Detroit, Minnesota and eventual winner Boston) before fading in late August. Eventually the Angels became the "spoilers" by defeating Detroit at Tiger Stadium in the last game of the regular season to give Boston its first AL pennant in 21 years. In 1970 the Angels finished third in the AL Western Division and Alex Johnson became the first (and so far only) Angel to win an American League batting title. Other notable Angels of this period included pitchers Clyde Wright and Ken McBride, shortstop Jim Fregosi, outfielders Albie Pearson and Leon Wagner, and catcher Buck Rodgers. Fregosi and Rodgers later managed the Angels.

== Nolan Ryan era, first postseason appearance (1972–1979) ==
During the 1970s, although Angel fans endured some mediocre years on the field they also were able to enjoy the heroics of fireballer Nolan Ryan, who tossed four of his seven no-hitters as an Angel. He also set several strikeout records throughout his career, most notably a 383-strikeout mark in 1973, still a major league record. Ryan was acquired in a trade that sent Jim Fregosi to the Mets. Ryan had been a middle relief pitcher on the "Miracle Mets" team that captured the 1969 World Series. Ryan's feats caused him to be named the Ryan Express, after the 1965 film Von Ryan's Express, which starred Frank Sinatra. His prowess, combined with that of fellow moundsman Frank Tanana, produced the refrain, "Tanana, Ryan and Two Days of Cryin'", a derivative of the refrain, "Spahn and Sain, then pray for rain", coined when Warren Spahn and Johnny Sain anchored the pitching staff of the then-Boston (now Atlanta) Braves in the 1940s.

The 1970s came to a close with the decision by then-general manager Buzzie Bavasi to allow Ryan to become a free agent. At the time, Bavasi remarked that Ryan, whose 1979 record was 16–14 (Ryan was 26–27 in the three seasons he played under Bavasi), could be replaced with two pitchers who go 8–7. Bavasi later claimed this was a mistake.

=== First AL West title (1979) ===
The Angels won their first American League West Division championship in 1979 under manager Jim Fregosi, a former Angel shortstop who was sent to the New York Mets in 1972 as part of the trade that brought Nolan Ryan to the Angels. Don Baylor became the first designated hitter to win the American League Most Valuable Player award. Other contributors to the team, which featured a powerful offense, were Bert Campaneris, Rod Carew, Dan Ford and Bobby Grich. However, the Angels lost what then was a best 3-out-of-5 American League Championship Series to the Baltimore Orioles, managed by Earl Weaver, 3 games to 1. The Angels won Game 3 at home, scoring twice in the bottom of the 9th inning to shade Baltimore 4–3.

This was the only year between 1971 and 1981 that the American League West was not won by either the Oakland Athletics or the Kansas City Royals.

== Superstar core and postseason shortcomings (1980–1989) ==
1979 had been the Angels' last season at the "old" Big A. The Los Angeles Rams agreed to move to Anaheim for the 1980 season, with seating increased to almost 65,000. The expansion completely enclosed the stadium, replacing the view of the San Gabriel and Santa Ana Mountains with three decks of gray concrete. In the 1980s, like many other baseball teams of that era, the Angels learned the difficulties of marketing the team while playing in a multi-purpose facility with a seating capacity too large for baseball.

=== One game away (1982) ===
The Angels nearly reached the World Series in the 1982 postseason. Reggie Jackson, who previously starred for the Oakland Athletics and the New York Yankees, joined the Angels that year and teamed with many holdovers from the 1979 team for the 1982 effort. The team was helmed by manager Gene Mauch, who would also manage the team during their 1986 postseason appearance. After clinching their second AL West championship, the Angels won the first two games of the best-of-five ALCS against the AL East champion Milwaukee Brewers – then promptly dropped the next three in a row to lose the series. As Steve Bisheff wrote in Tales from the Angels Dugout, "No team in history had ever come back from an 0–2 deficit to win in a best-of-five series. Of course, no team had ever faced the Angels in that situation." (At that time, the team with home field advantage played the first two games on the road before hosting the final three games at home, a format that was changed [being expanded to a best-of-seven series] starting in the 1985 season. In subsequent years, the same has happened to other teams.)

=== One strike away (1986) ===
Again, the Angels nearly reached the World Series in the 1986 postseason. Baylor was gone, but among the new additions were American League Rookie of the Year runner-up Wally Joyner and pitcher Chuck Finley. Champions of the AL West for the third time, the Angels faced the AL East champions Boston Red Sox in the ALCS. Leading in the series 3 games to 1, the Angels were one out away from defeating Boston and going to the World Series for the first time in their history. Leading 5–2 in the top of the ninth inning of Game 5, starter Mike Witt surrendered a two-run home run to former Angel Don Baylor, cutting the Angels' lead to 5–4. After reliever Gary Lucas hit Rich Gedman with his first and only pitch, closer Donnie Moore came in to shut the door. Though twice the Angels were one strike away from the Series, Moore gave up a two-out, two-strike, two-run home run to Dave Henderson that put Boston ahead 6–5.

Although the Angels managed to tie the game in the bottom of the ninth, Henderson again came through for the Red Sox with a sacrifice fly in the 11th, eventually giving Boston a 7–6 victory. Thoroughly shocked, the Angels then travelled to Fenway Park and were blown out in Games 6 and 7 as the Red Sox claimed the pennant. Boston would go on to lose the 1986 World Series in seven games to the New York Mets, a series known for the infamous Bill Buckner error in Game 6.

In the aftermath of the ALCS, Angels fans regarded Henderson's home run off Moore as the point at which their team had been closest to the World Series, and thus Moore became the scapegoat for the Angels' loss of the pennant. Although the fans were hard on him, Moore (who had battled depression in the past) was even harder on himself, and that one pitch to Henderson that turned the tide of the ALCS haunted him for the rest of his days. He would take his own life three years later, claiming to have never gotten over that moment. Moore's suicide was the latest in a series of tragedies that dogged the team (star outfielder Lyman Bostock was shot to death in 1978 while visiting friends in Gary, Indiana) and gave rise to talk of a "hex" on the franchise. The Angels would not qualify for the playoffs for the next 16 years.

== Postseason drought (1990–1999) ==
For most of the 1990s, the Angels played sub-.500 baseball, due in no small part to the confusion which reigned at the top. Gene Autry, though holding a controlling interest in the Angels, was in control in name only due to poor health in his advanced years. Autry's wife Jackie, 20 years his junior, at times seemed to be the decision-maker, and at other times the Disney Company, then a minority owner, seemed to be in charge.

On May 21, 1992, an Angels' team bus traveling from New York to Baltimore crashed on the New Jersey Turnpike. Twelve members of the team ensemble were injured, including manager Buck Rodgers, who was hospitalized and missed the next two months of the season.

In 1993, the Angels had a new spring training camp in Tempe, Arizona after 31 previous seasons in Palm Springs Stadium in Palm Springs, an idea Autry developed from the days when he stayed in his desert resort home. The Angels hoped a new facility would rejuvenate and improve the roster in the long run. The 1993 and 1994 seasons proved to be worse for the Angels than the previous three, particularly since the 1994 season ended in a baseball player strike that kept Angel fans waiting even longer for the team's fate to change. In that season, the Angels had the second-worst record in baseball at the time of the strike, and were en route to a 66–96 season, which would have been their worst record in team history had the season continued, and were in last place in their division, but just 5 1/2 games out.

In 1995, the Angels suffered the worst collapse in franchise history. In first place in the AL West by 11 games on August 9, the team again lost key personnel (particularly shortstop Gary DiSarcina) and went on an extended slide during the final stretch run, during which they suffered two separate streaks of nine consecutive losses. By season's end, the Angels were in a first-place tie with the surging Seattle Mariners, prompting a one-game playoff for the division title. The Mariners, managed by Lou Piniella and led by pitching ace Randy Johnson, laid a 9–1 drubbing on the Angels in the playoff game, clinching their first AL West championship and forcing the Angels and their fans to endure yet another season of heartbreak and bitter disappointment.

Given the club's inability to win a pennant thus far, the postseason disasters of 1982 and 1986, the 1995 collapse, and tragedies such as Bostock's murder and Moore's suicide, it was suggested that there must be a "curse" on the Angels. Since there did not appear to be a single defining moment when things started to go downhill, or one where "the baseball gods" might have been offended, some suggested that it was Autry who was the cause, a grand life seeing all its good luck evened out in his ownership of a baseball team. The idea of a "Curse of the Cowboy" did not take hold, however, due to the great affection Autry engendered as a public figure, and the idea would diminish with the sale of the team and its later postseason success.

To some extent, the idea of a different curse did take hold, however. Prior to the Angels' World Series victory in 2002, some had theorized that the team did not have success because its stadium, Angel Stadium of Anaheim, was supposedly built upon an ancient Native American burial ground (although Anaheim city historians have not been able to either confirm or debunk the theory).

Heck, people were talking about it in spring training. We were standing around the outfield one day and everyone was concerned about the stadium being cursed because it was built on an ancient Indian burial ground. We were going to go get an exorcist or a Catholic priest or something to get rid of the curse. I'm like, "I don't want to be on an Indian burial ground."

— Ben Weber, former Angels pitcher, in 2002

The Walt Disney Company effectively took control of the Angels in 1996, when it was able to gain enough support on the board to hire Tony Tavares as team president. Gene Autry, however, remained as chairman until his death in 1998. In 1999, Tavares hired Bill Stoneman as team general manager, under whose watch the Angels eventually won their first World Series Championship.

Although Disney did not technically acquire a controlling interest in the team until after Autry's death, for all practical purposes it ran the team (the Autry loyalists on the board acted as "silent partners") through its Anaheim Sports subsidiary, which also owned the NHL's Mighty Ducks of Anaheim at the time.

Disney, of course, had been a catalyst for the development of and population growth in Orange County, having opened its Disneyland theme park in Anaheim in 1955. Autry had named Walt Disney himself to the Angels' board in 1960; Mr. Disney served on the board until his death in 1966, and had been one of the proponents of the team's move to Orange County in 1965–66. Walt Disney Pictures also produced the 1994 movie Angels in the Outfield, which featured a fictionalized version of the team.

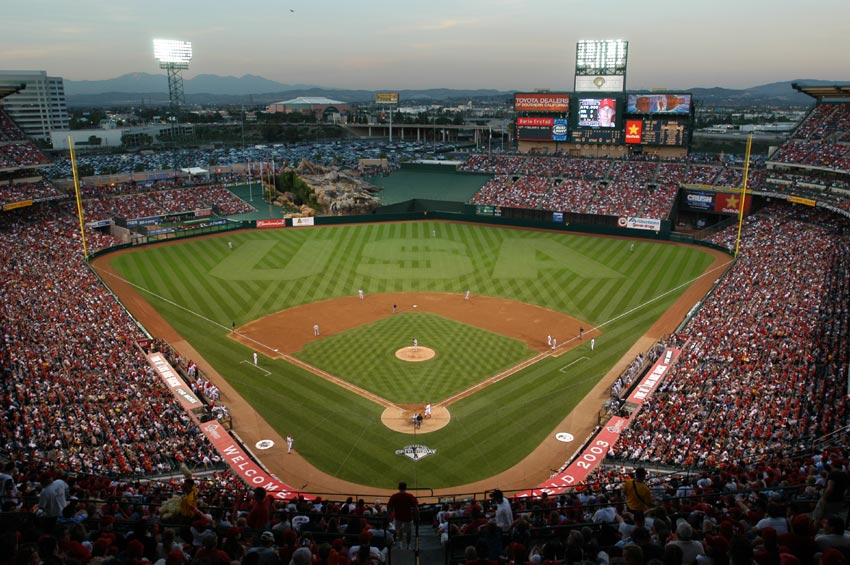
Edison International Field in 2003

In 1995, the year of the Angels' worst regular season collapse, the Los Angeles Rams had moved to St. Louis, citing the deteriorating conditions at Anaheim Stadium as a primary cause for the move. Angels management, stuck in an aging, oversized "white elephant" of a stadium, hinted the team might be moved from Southern California as well.

In 1996, KCAL-TV became the broadcast television home of the Angels, replacing KTLA after 32 seasons.

In 1997, negotiations between the Angels and the city of Anaheim for renovation of Anaheim Stadium ended with an agreement to rehabilitate and downsize the facility into a baseball-only stadium once more. One condition of the stadium agreement was that the Angels could sell naming rights to the renovated stadium, so long as the new name was one "containing Anaheim therein". Anaheim Stadium was almost immediately renamed Edison International Field of Anaheim, though it was almost always referred to as simply Edison Field. Sportscasters also referred to the stadium at the time as The Big Ed, with a few others continuing to use the Big A nickname and, at times, Anaheim Stadium.

Another condition of the stadium renovation agreement was that the team name itself be one "containing Anaheim therein". The emerging Disney ownership was itself in the process of renovating and upgrading its aging Disneyland park. Disney hoped to market Anaheim as a "destination city", much the same way it had done with Orlando, Florida, where Walt Disney World was located while also making an "ESPN West" that would show the Angels and Ducks (which eventually fell through). Accordingly, the team changed its name again, to the Anaheim Angels on November 19, 1996.

== First World Series and consistent contention (2000–2009) ==
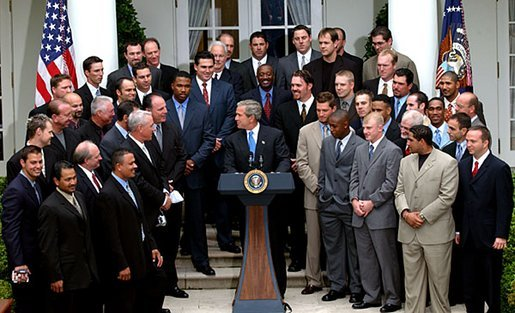
Victorious Angels players being honored at the White House Rose Garden by President George W. Bush

Then came 2002. The year began with the team scrapping its pinstriped vest jerseys after five years, reverting to uniforms conforming more to the team's traditional uniforms, but now mostly red, with a bit of navy blue trim. Significantly, the Angels' road jerseys now read "Anaheim", the first time the team's geographic location had been noted on its uniforms since 1965.

Pundits predicted the Angels to be third-place finishers in the four-team AL West division, and the team played to those expectations with a 6–14 start to the regular season. The Angels, managed by former Los Angeles Dodgers catcher Mike Scioscia, then went on to win 99 games and earn the American League Wild Card berth. The Oakland Athletics won 103 games, putting the Angels in second place in the division. The Angels defeated the AL East champions New York Yankees 3 games to 1 in the American League Division Series, ending the Yankees' streak of 4 straight American League Pennants, and the Minnesota Twins 4 games to 1 in the ALCS, to win the American League pennant for the first time in their history.

In the 2002 World Series they met the Wild Card San Francisco Giants, paced by slugger Barry Bonds, in what ended up being the highest-scoring World Series of all time. San Francisco took Game 1 (4–3), but the Angels followed that up by winning Games 2 (11–10) and 3 (10–4). The Giants came back to win Games 4 (4–3) and 5 (16–4). The turning point in the series came in Game 6. The Angels trailed 5–0 and were 8 outs away from elimination before rallying for 3 runs in both the seventh and eighth innings to win 6–5. The Angels then won Game 7, 4–1, to claim their franchise's first and (to date) only World Series Championship.

Third baseman Troy Glaus was named the MVP of the Series. 20-year-old rookie relief pitcher Francisco Rodríguez won a record five postseason games, despite never having won a regular-season game before. Angels pitcher John Lackey became the first rookie pitcher to win the seventh game of the World Series in 93 years.

The Angels' 2000 season marked the introduction of a mascot known as the Rally Monkey. The whole movement began as a joke by the video crew in the stadium during a game where the Angels were trailing the Giants 5–4. A looped clip of Ace Ventura: Pet Detective where a monkey jumps up and down was shown on the Jumbotron Video Screen with the flashing sign of "Rally Monkey" during times when the Angels got runners on base while behind or tied. The Angels went on to win that game, and started to build a following as "the comeback kids", most famously exemplified in Game 6 of the 2002 World Series (coincidentally against the Giants).

On May 15, 2003, Disney sold the Angels to Angels Baseball, L.P., a group headed by advertising magnate Arturo "Arte" Moreno. The sale made the Angels the first major American sports team to be owned by a Hispanic owner and also signaled the beginning of the end of Disney's involvement in professional sports. The company sold the Mighty Ducks of Anaheim hockey team two years later.

In December 2003, after a seven-year run as Edison International Field of Anaheim, Edison removed its name from the stadium. The stadium was renamed Angel Stadium of Anaheim, again almost always referred to as simply Angel Stadium or, The Big A, although the original name, Anaheim Stadium, is still used by locals. The stadium is owned by the City of Anaheim, which has shown no compunction toward changing the name. Over the years, there have been few, if any, complaints from Anaheim officials about the dropping of "of Anaheim" from common parlance when referring to the stadium.

On January 3, 2005, Angels Baseball, L.P. announced that it would change the name of the club from Anaheim Angels to Los Angeles Angels of Anaheim. As stated in the club's 2005 media guide:

The inclusion of Los Angeles reflects the original expansion name and returns the Angels as Major League Baseball's American League representative in the Greater Los Angeles territory.

The new name sparked outrage among Anaheim and Los Angeles city leaders, who argued that a team that does not play its home games within the city or county of Los Angeles should not claim to be from Los Angeles, even though the Los Angeles Rams played for years in Anaheim without incident. They also regarded the name a lingual farce, as the English "The Angels" was mixed with the Spanish "Los Angeles", especially in a region where Spanish is so heavily used. With the support of the city of Los Angeles, The Walt Disney Company, and every city in Orange County, the city of Anaheim sued the Angels, claiming the team violated its lease with the city. The team countered that they were in full compliance with the lease, since the lease only stipulated that the team name contain "Anaheim", and the new name was well within the bounds of this stipulation. A jury trial, which concluded February 9, 2006 resulted in a verdict siding with the Angels and allowing the team to keep the new name.

Although organized fan resistance to the new name had subsided, legal challenges to restore the name Anaheim Angels went forward. They were not successful, however, and on January 13, 2009, Anaheim mayor Curt Pringle announced that the city council had voted unanimously to drop the legal challenge.

On official press releases, and on the team's website, the entire name "Los Angeles Angels of Anaheim" is used. In other contexts, the team uses simply "Angels" or "Angels Baseball". The team correctly anticipated that the national media and baseball fans outside of the Southern California media market would simply drop "of Anaheim" and refer to the team as the "Los Angeles Angels". When Major League Baseball uses location to identify a team, it refers to the Angels as "Los Angeles", as do MLB's member teams and multiple sportscasters.

2003 was a tough year, following the previous season's championship. The Angels finished 77–85 in third place and 19 games behind A.L. West champions Oakland.

However, all was not bleak for the Angels. They sent three players to the All-Star Game. Slugging third baseman Troy Glaus and veteran outfielder Garret Anderson were in the starting lineup, while relief pitcher Brendan Donnelly was selected to be in the bullpen. Anderson would go on to win the All-Star Game Most Valuable Player Award, as well as the Home Run Derby, and Donnelly picked up the win in the game.

From 2004 to the present the Angels have been in the unfamiliar role of perennial playoff contender; however, they have not returned to the World Series since the 2002 campaign.

In 2004, newly acquired free-agent Vladimir Guerrero won the American League Most Valuable Player Award as he led the Angels to their first American League West championship since 1986.

Also in 2004, the Angels mounted a comeback to overcome the division leading Oakland Athletics in the last week of the regular season, clinching the title in the next-to-last game. However, they were swept in the American League Division Series 3 games to 0 by the AL Wild Card Boston Red Sox, who, after beating their longtime rivals, the New York Yankees, went on to win their first World Series since 1918.

In the 2005 season, the Angels became the first team in the American League to clinch their division, doing so with 5 games left in the regular season. It was also the first time the team had made the playoffs in back-to-back years. The Angels went on in 2005 to beat the AL East champions New York Yankees in the Division Series in 5 games, but lost in the American League Championship Series to the eventual World Series Champions Chicago White Sox in 5 games. Pitcher Bartolo Colón, who went 21–8 for the season, was voted A.L. Cy Young Award winner in 2005, only the second Angel to be so honored (Dean Chance won the award in 1964).

While the Angels were not able to play October baseball, several players met or broke individual records in 2006. Closer Francisco Rodríguez led the major leagues and broke a franchise record in saves with 47, and became the youngest closer to record 100 career saves. Scot Shields led American League setup men in holds with 31, and was second in the league in innings of relief pitched with 87.2 innings. Chone Figgins was second in the American League in stolen bases with 52. Jered Weaver tied Whitey Ford's American League rookie record by winning the first nine decisions of his career.

In 2006, the Angels signed a new broadcast television deal with KCOP-TV after 10 seasons with KCAL-TV.

The Angels finished in second place in the American League West for the 2006 season, missing the postseason for the first time since 2003. While a disappointing development for the franchise, the 2006 campaign was the Angels' third straight season with a winning record, a first in club history. Owner Arte Moreno vowed that the club would make "major" changes during the offseason, a comment that generated talk in trades or free agent signings of players such as Carlos Lee, Miguel Tejada, Aramis Ramírez or perhaps even Alex Rodriguez. Center fielder Gary Matthews, Jr. signed a 5-year, $50-million contract in a deal.

The 2007 season proved to be a success for the Angels. The Angels got off to the best start in club history, becoming the first club in the major leagues to win 50 games while maintaining a lead in the American League West. Chone Figgins set a club record for the most hits in a single month with 53, and became just the second Angel to go six-for-six in a single, nine-inning game. Ace John Lackey was the first starter in the American League to win ten games. Lackey, along with Francisco Rodriguez and Vladimir Guerrero, were chosen to represent the Angels at the 2007 All-Star Game in San Francisco. Guerrero became just the third Angel to win the Home Run Derby, and Rodriguez was the first to earn a save in an All-Star Game.

2007 was also a resurgent year for veteran outfielder Garret Anderson. On August 21, Anderson set a new club record for most RBIs in one game with 10 against the New York Yankees. He also posted a new Angel record with eleven consecutive games with an RBI on September 6 after hitting a single off Indians pitcher Paul Byrd. On September 7, Anderson again posted a new Angel record with twelve consecutive games with an RBI single against Cleveland's pitcher Jake Westbrook.

On September 23, 2007, the Angels defeated the Seattle Mariners to clinch the championship of the American League West Division. This is the club's sixth division title and seventh overall playoff berth in its history. The Angels were unable to follow up their success in the regular season with playoff success, as the club, depleted by injuries, was swept by the AL East champions Boston Red Sox in the ALDS.

After the 2007 playoff campaign ended, general manager Bill Stoneman retired and was replaced by Tony Reagins. Reagins quickly made two headline roster moves: the acquisition of free agent outfielder Torii Hunter, previously of the Minnesota Twins, as well as the trade of shortstop Orlando Cabrera to the Chicago White Sox for starting pitcher Jon Garland.

Though hampered by injuries on Opening Day 2008 (including to veteran starting pitcher John Lackey), the Angels had the best record in the American League (tied with the Chicago Cubs for best record in MLB) going into the All-Star break. On July 20, closer Francisco Rodríguez accumulated 40 saves in 98 team games, becoming the fastest pitcher to accumulate 40 saves since John Smoltz did so in 108 team games in 2003. Rodríguez broke Bobby Thigpen's all-time record for saves in a season on September 13 in a game against the Seattle Mariners and eventually finished with 62 saves. The Angels made another headline trade on July 29, acquiring first baseman Mark Teixeira from the Atlanta Braves in exchange for Casey Kotchman and minor league pitcher Stephen Marek.

On September 10, 2008, with a win over the New York Yankees and a loss by the Texas Rangers to the Seattle Mariners, the Angels clinched their seventh American League West Division title. By clinching on September 10, the Angels set a new mark for the earliest clinch date in American League West history. They would finish the 2008 regular season setting a franchise record for wins at 100, breaking the previous club record of 99 wins set by the 2002 World Series championship team. For the second straight year, the Angels faced off against the Boston Red Sox (AL Wild Card) in the ALDS, but were unable to advance, losing the series 3 games to 1.

As the Angels' much-lauded rotation was set to return for 2009, injuries suddenly plagued John Lackey and Ervin Santana, while Kelvim Escobar was experiencing setbacks to his long-awaited return. This caused the Angels to add long-relievers Dustin Moseley and Shane Loux to the rotation, as well as call up top prospect Nick Adenhart to the rotation.

These injuries left the Opening Day start to Joe Saunders, who pitched a dominating game against the Oakland Athletics to start the season. Two days later, Nick Adenhart made his first start of the season, pitching six shutout innings before being pulled from the game. Hours later, he and two other friends were killed in a hit-and-run crash. Adenhart's death was a shock to the team and to all baseball fans nationwide. It caused the next day's game to be postponed, and the Angels' April 10 game against the Boston Red Sox became a tribute to Adenhart.

After Adenhart's death, this left another gap in the rotation, which led to reliever Darren Oliver taking his place. Shortly after, Moseley would become injured, resulting in minor leaguer Matt Palmer being called up. Palmer would claim six victories in his first eight starts before his first loss on June 29, cementing him a spot in the rotation, while Escobar would make only one start after returning from the disabled list before becoming reinjured.

Moseley (who would almost immediately injure himself) and Loux, after paltry beginnings to their season, would reclaim their long-relief spots as Lackey and Santana returned. However, Santana once again became injured, and minor leaguer Sean O'Sullivan took his place, creating a masterful debut of his own, winning his first two starts in dominating appearances.

Amid all of the pitching rotation chaos, outfielder Torii Hunter quietly took the place as leader of the Angels' offense, with a powerful April where he hit eight home runs, then third in the American League. Offseason addition Bobby Abreu had a modest start to the season before making a powerful presence in June.

The Angels were originally to send two players, Hunter and closer Brian Fuentes, to the All-Star Game. However, with just days before the game, Hunter was sent to the disabled list with a groin injury, effectively removing him from the All-Star Game. The team's offensive catalyst, Chone Figgins, was eligible for the All-Star Game Final Vote, but placed third. However, he would later be added to the roster the morning of the game to replace injured Tampa Bay Rays slugger Evan Longoria.

As the non-waiver trade deadline of July 31 loomed, the Angels were seen as big contenders for Heath Bell, Cliff Lee and even Roy Halladay; however, all of these rumors fell through. Nearly a month later, however, on August 29, two days before the waiver trade deadline, the Angels acquired Tampa Bay Rays ace Scott Kazmir, in exchange for two low-level minor leaguers and prized prospect Sean Rodriguez. Ervin Santana shut-out the Texas Rangers for the West Division Title on September 28, 2009.

For the third straight year, the Angels faced the Boston Red Sox (the AL Wild Card) in the ALDS. Despite being 0–4 in playoff series against the Red Sox and having lost 12 of the last 13 post-season games against them, the Angels swept the series 3–0. The Angels next faced the New York Yankees in the ALCS, but went on to lose the series 4 games to 2.

The Angels entered the 2009 offseason with countless question marks, most notably if they would retain pitching ace John Lackey and fan favorite Chone Figgins. The answer to both of these questions was no, as Lackey and Figgins signed with Boston and Seattle respectively.

The Angels were, once again, big players to acquire Toronto ace Roy Halladay in the winter, and were rumored to have offered a package of Joe Saunders, Erick Aybar and Peter Bourjos for Halladay, but the Blue Jays instead sent Halladay to two-time defending National League champion Philadelphia for three prospects. The Angels' next plan was to acquire Phillies ace Cliff Lee, but just hours after Halladay was dealt, Lee was traded to Seattle for a prospect package.

On this same action-packed day, the Angels signed reigning 2009 World Series MVP Hideki Matsui to a one-year, $6.5 million contract, effectively spelling the end of longtime fan favorite Vladimir Guerrero's time with the Angels.

On Christmas Eve, the team signed Detroit reliever Fernando Rodney to a two-year, $11 million deal, doing so after the loss of reliever Darren Oliver, who would sign with division rival Texas.

The Angels headed into 2010 with an uncertain roster, similar to how they entered the 2009 season.

== The Mike Trout era (2010–2019) ==
The Angels got off to a mediocre start to the season in April; however, things looked to be turning around near the end of May, as slugging first baseman Kendry Morales was on pace to top his home run totals from 2009. However, on May 29, in a game against the Seattle Mariners, Morales hit a walk-off grand slam to give the Angels a 5–1 victory; this victory was quite bittersweet, as Morales broke his leg jumping on home plate. This would send Morales to the disabled list for the remainder of the 2010 season.

Although the Angels stormed to a record of 18–9 in the month of June, the team never quite recovered from the loss of Morales, as they posted three consecutive sub-.500 months from July to September. However, the team did not back down without a fight. On July 22, the team acquired third baseman Alberto Callaspo from the Kansas City Royals in exchange for Sean O'Sullivan and a pitching prospect. Although this move received mild criticism, general manager Tony Reagins certainly silenced the critics three days later, on July 25; it was on that day that he pulled off a trade with the Arizona Diamondbacks. The Angels acquired ace starting pitcher Dan Haren in exchange for pitchers Joe Saunders and Rafael Rodríguez, and prospects Patrick Corbin and Tyler Skaggs; it is notable that all four pitchers the Angels sent in return are left-handed pitchers.

Haren added certainty to an already-strong rotation, posting an earned run average of 2.87; however, due to poor run support from the Angels' anemic offense, Haren posted a win–loss record of 5–4 in his 14 starts with the team.

Attempting to replace Morales' bat, at least for the short term, the Angels nearly had a trade in place for Chicago Cubs first baseman Derrek Lee; however, even though the two parties agreed on the terms of the deal and were ready to pull the trigger, Lee invoked his no-trade clause, and the deal was nixed. This move on Lee's part proved fatal for the Angels, as they never did find the right bat to replace Morales, ending the season with a record of 80–82, in third place and ten games behind the division champion (and eventually American League champion) Texas Rangers.

The Angels hosted the All-Star Game for the third time in franchise history and the first since 1989.

The Angels' 2011 season saw pitcher Ervin Santana throw a no-hitter in a game against the Cleveland Indians, while first baseman Mark Trumbo finished as the runner-up in American League Rookie of the Year voting. The Angels finished second in the AL West with an 86–76 record.

The Angels' 2012 season marked with the signing of Albert Pujols to a ten-year contract after he completed 11 seasons with the St. Louis Cardinals, playing in three World Series (2004, 2006 and 2011) winning two championships (2006 and 2011) as well as the signing of left-handed pitcher C. J. Wilson, who grew up in Orange County, California and previously pitched for the Texas Rangers. The same year, outfielder Mike Trout won the American League Rookie of the Year award, the first since 1993, while pitcher Jered Weaver threw a no-hitter against the Minnesota Twins.

The Angels' 2013 season marked with signing of outfielder Josh Hamilton and playing in a five-team American League West Division with the addition of the Houston Astros switching leagues for the first time in 15 years. After the season, first baseman/outfielder Mark Trumbo was traded to the Arizona Diamondbacks and the Angels acquired left-handed pitcher Hector Santiago from the Chicago White Sox.

The Angels' 2014 season saw the team win the American League West division title for the first time since 2009. Facing the Kansas City Royals in the American League Division Series, the Angels lost the series 3–0. Mike Trout won the American League MVP Award.

The Angels' 2015 season ended with a third-place finish in the American League West division. After the season, shortstop Erick Aybar was traded to the Atlanta Braves for shortstop Andrelton Simmons.

The Angels' 2016 season ended with a fourth-place finish in the American League West division and with their first losing record since 2010. During the season, the Angels traded pitcher Hector Santiago for pitcher Ricky Nolasco, while former San Francisco Giants pitcher Tim Lincecum signed with the Angels.

The Angels' 2017 season ended with a second-place finish in the American League West division, finishing with a record of 80 wins and 82 losses, 21 games behind the Houston Astros. Mike Trout hurt his thumb while sliding second base in a game at Miami against the Marlins. Trout was not present for the All-Star Game played in Miami. The Angels traded outfielder Cameron Maybin to the Astros at the end of the waiver-trading deadline in late August. During the offseason, the Angels won the race to sign Shohei Ohtani, a two-way player who previously played for the Nippon-Ham Fighters in the Nippon Professional Baseball league.

The Angels' 2018 season ended with a fourth-place finish in the American League West division, finishing with a record of 80 wins and 82 losses. Shohei Ohtani made his MLB debut on March 29 as a designated hitter against the Oakland Athletics and three days later, he made his pitching debut en route to the 2018 American League Rookie of the Year Award. In the final game of the 2018 season at home against the Oakland Athletics, manager Mike Scioscia announced his resignation after 19 years as the team's manager. During Scioscia's tenure, the Angels won six American League West Division titles in 2004, 2005, 2007, 2008, 2009 and 2014 and an American League Wild Card berth and a World Series championship in 2002.

The Angels' 2019 season ended with a fourth-place finish in the American League West division, finishing with a record of 72 wins and 90 losses. Brad Ausmus, a former Major League Baseball catcher from 1993 to 2010 and Detroit Tigers' manager from 2014 to 2017, became the manager. Pitcher Tyler Skaggs died on July 1, hours before the Angels were scheduled to play against the Texas Rangers in a game that was postponed. On July 12, the Angels no-hit the Seattle Mariners at home and all the players wore No. 45 in Skaggs' memory. The Angels fired Ausmus on September 30.

Mike Trout won his third MVP Award after hitting .291 and leading the majors in OBP (.438) and leading the AL in slugging (.643) and OPS (1.083). He also finished second in the AL with 45 homers despite missing most of September with an injury.

== The Trout and Ohtani era (2020–2023) ==
Joe Maddon, who had previously managed the Tampa Bay Rays and the Chicago Cubs to the World Series, was hired as the Angels' new manager. In the pandemic-shortened 2020 season, the Angels went 26–34 and finished fourth in the American League West.

In 2021, the cable television home of the Angels, Fox Sports West, becomes Bally Sports West.

The Angels finished fourth in the American League West for the fourth consecutive year in 2021, posting a 77–85 record. Mike Trout missed most of the season due to a torn calf muscle. Shohei Ohtani was unanimously voted the AL MVP and was presented with the Commissioner's Historic Achievement Award after a campaign where he hit 46 home runs and stole 26 bases as an offensive player and earned nine wins as a pitcher.

2022 began well for the Angels, as they were in first place in the AL West as late as May 16. However, the Angels went into a tailspin starting on May 25, when they began a 14-game losing streak. After the 12th loss, Joe Maddon was fired as manager and was replaced by third base coach Phil Nevin. The Angels finished the season in third place with a 73–89 record.

The Angels' started their 2023 season with high hopes of a playoff berth as Ohtani set the pace for having one of the greatest performances by an individual player in history since Babe Ruth. However, the season was ended on a repeat of the 73–89 record, however fourth in the AL West. At the end of the season, Phil Nevin was fired after a season and a half, the team then hiring a 71 year old Ron Washington, who was in his first managing position in a decade. Nearing the end of the calendar year, two-way star Shohei Ohtani signed to the Los Angeles Dodgers in a contract valued at $700 million, shattering the current record of $426.5 million given to the Angels' Mike Trout. This was later broken by Juan Soto who signed a 15 year, $765 million contract with the Mets.

== See also ==
- Angels all-time roster
- Angels award winners and league leaders
- Angels statistical records and milestone achievements
- Angels broadcasters and media
- Angels managers and ownership
