= List of Los Angeles Angels owners and executives =

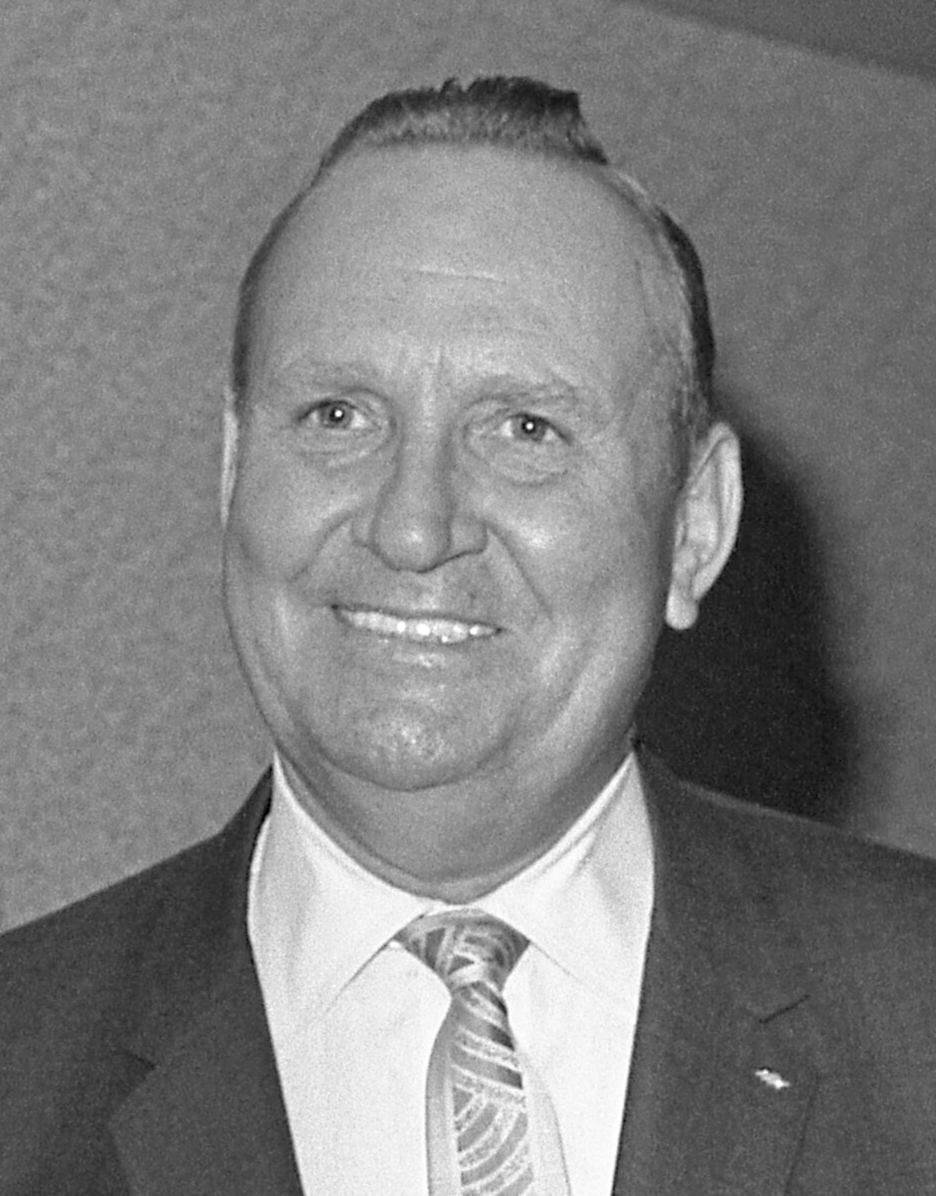
Gene Autry was the first owner of the Angels franchise.

The Los Angeles Angels are a professional baseball team based in Anaheim, California. The team has had four principal owners and ten General Managers since its inception in 1961.

== Owners ==
Name	Years	Notes
Gene Autry	1960–1998	Persuaded by baseball executives at the time to take ownership of the expansion team, rather than just the broadcast rights.
Jackie Autry	1998–1999	Became legal owner of the team following her husband Gene Autry's death.
The Walt Disney Company	1999–2003	Effectively took control of the Angels in 1996, when it was able to gain enough support on the board to hire Tony Tavares as team president. Gene Autry remained as chairman until his death in 1998.
Arte Moreno	2003–2026	Made history on May 15, 2003, by becoming the first Mexican American and the first Latin American to own a major sports team in the United States when he purchased the Angels from the Walt Disney Company. The sale of the team to Stan Kroenke was announced on September 1, 2026.
Stan Kroenke	2027–	It was announced on September 1, 2026 that Stan Kroenke had agreed to purchase the Angels for a reported $4 billion, a Major League record. The sale is expected to be closed in the first quarter of 2027.

== General managers ==
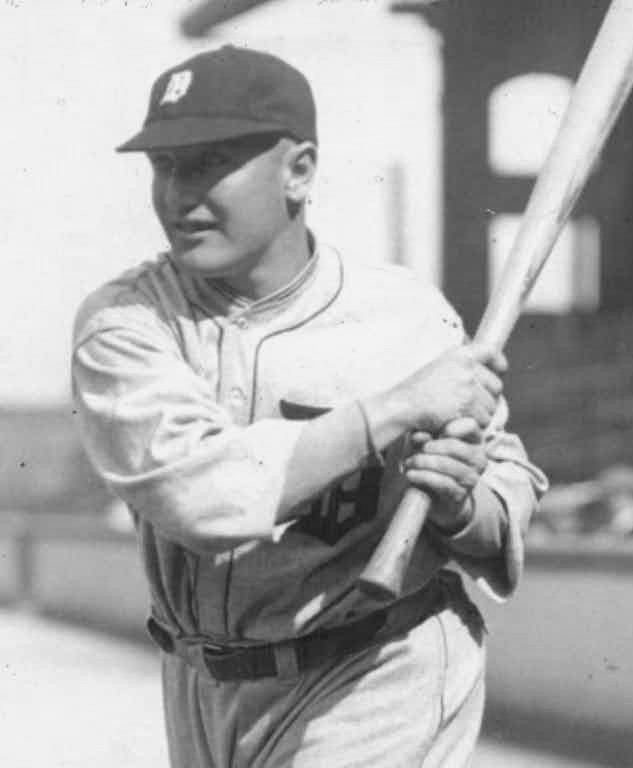
Fred Haney was the first general manager of the Angels (1960–68).

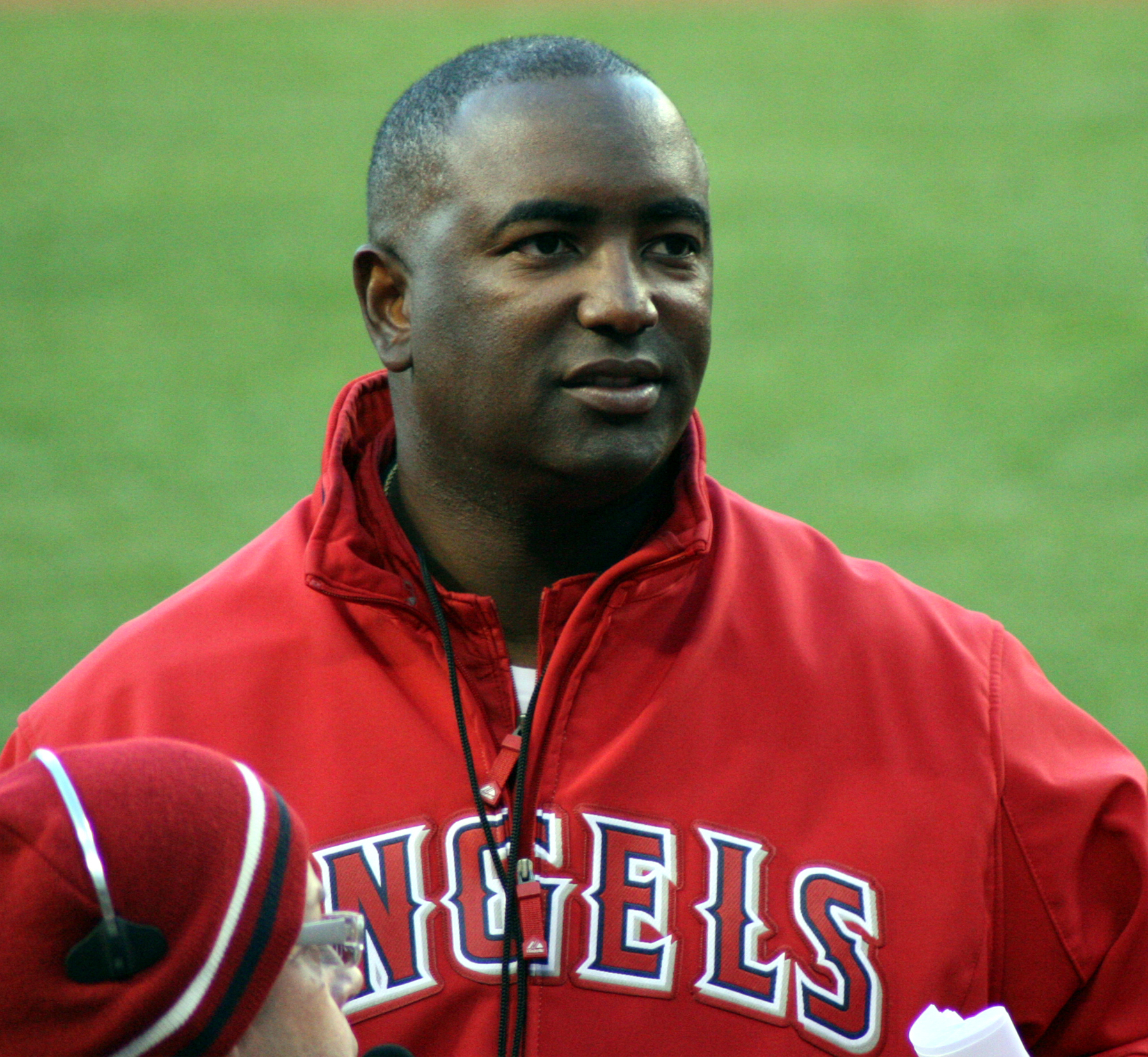
Tony Reagins served as the general manager of the Angels from 2007 to 2011.

Name	Years	Notes
Fred Haney	1960–1968	Became the first General Manager of the team when tapped by owner Gene Autry. Retired in 1968.
Dick Walsh	1968–1971	Named successor as General Manager by Gene Autry following the retirement of Haney. Walsh was fired by Autry after the 1971 season due to the team failing to meet expectations.
Harry Dalton	1971–1977	Was hired by Autry away from the Baltimore Orioles. Acquired pitcher Nolan Ryan from the New York Mets. After the 1977 season the Angels released Dalton from his contract.
Buzzie Bavasi	1977–1984	Hired by Autry, Bavasi took the team to its first two appearances in the postseason. Retired in 1984.
Mike Port	1984–1991	
Dan O'Brien Sr.	1991–1993	
Whitey Herzog	1993–1994	Former St. Louis Cardinals manager during the 1980s
Bill Bavasi	1994–1999	Son of former General Manager Buzzie Bavasi.
Bill Stoneman	1999–2007	Former pitcher, who threw the first no-hitter in Montreal Expos' history; won the World Series as Angels GM in 2002.
Tony Reagins	2007–2011	Became the first African-American General Manager in club history.
Jerry Dipoto	2011–2015	Former MLB pitcher (1993–2000).
Billy Eppler	2015–2020	On November 18, 2021, the New York Mets hired Eppler as their general manager
Perry Minasian	2020–2026	The Angels fired Minasian on June 26, 2026.
John Mozeliak	2026	Interim

== See also ==
- List of Los Angeles Angels managers
- List of Major League Baseball principal owners
- History of the Los Angeles Angels
