= Anaheim Sports =

Anaheim Sports, Inc.
- Formerly: Disney Sports Enterprises, Inc. (1986-1996)
- Company type: Subsidiary of a public corporation
- Industry: Sports
- Defunct: 2005
- Fate: Dissolved
- Headquarters: Anaheim, California, United States
- Key people: Tony Tavares (President)
- Parent: Walt Disney Parks and Resorts (The Walt Disney Company)
- Divisions: Mighty Ducks of Anaheim; Anaheim Angels; Disney Ice

Anaheim Sports, Inc., formerly Disney Sports Enterprises, Inc. (DSE), was a fully owned subsidiary of The Walt Disney Company based in Anaheim, California and created in 1992 as the ownership group for the Mighty Ducks of Anaheim professional hockey team.

== History ==
=== Disney Sports Enterprises ===
Disney Sports Enterprises, Inc. was incorporated in California on December 12, 1986.

Disney purchased a National Hockey League expansion franchise in December 1992 for Anaheim. The team was named Mighty Ducks after a Disney movie, The Mighty Ducks. The movie and the team was due to Disney CEO Michael Eisner interest with hockey which stemmed from his sons playing the game. NHL executives considered it a "coup" and ESPN gave the NHL its best deal to date for TV rights, $600 million for 5 years. As a Disney conglomerate unit, its president reported to Disney vice chairman Sandy Litvack while financial counting as a part of its parks and resorts segment. With the record sales of Mighty Ducks licensed merchandising, the Los Angeles Dodgers in March 1995 turned to Disney to handle its merchandising operation.

Following the Mighty Ducks movie/pro-team marketing formula, first Disney released in 1994 Angels in the Outfield film then offered to purchase the California Angels. In May 1995, DSE agreed to purchase 25% of the Angels from Gene Autry with an option to purchase the remaining ownership. The company then agreed to a new lease with the city of Anaheim, in which it agreed to add the city's name to the name of the baseball club in return for full management of Anaheim Stadium and an increased share of the stadium's revenues. DSE took operational control of the Angels in May 1996 which was renamed the Anaheim Angels.

=== Anaheim Sports ===
In December 1996, Disney Sports Enterprises, Inc. was renamed to Anaheim Sports, Inc. for tax purposes and to align with the teams' names. Anaheim Sports teams were then seen as an additional draw for people to visit Disneyland Resort and a key to a potential regional sports channel, ESPN West.

By 1998, the two teams were losing money and the ESPN West channel never got off the ground, which could have justified keeping the teams. The two teams were put up for sale in 1999. From 1995 to 1998, the Angels lost Anaheim on average $16.6 million while only being competitive in three out of five years. While the Ducks were a money maker in the beginning, the team was expected to lose money for its third season. Broadcom Corporation had approached Disney about interactive broadcasting rights for the teams which would have allow viewers at home to purchase Anaheim tickets and merchandise via their remote controls. Instead, Disney offered to sell the Broadcom partners, Henry Samueli and Henry Nicholas, the two teams for $450 million.

President Tony Tavares signed a three-year contract extension in 2000. With the December 31, 2000 retirement of vice chairman Litvack, Anaheim Sports began reporting to Walt Disney Parks and Resorts chairman Paul Pressler. At the time, it was planned that the ESPN Zone restaurant would increase promotional efforts with the two sports teams.

The Lehman Bros. investment bank was hired to sell the two teams, separately or together, in 2002. In May 2003, the company sold the Angels to advertising magnate Arte Moreno. In February 2005, it agreed to sell the Mighty Ducks and the Disney Ice, the team's training facility, to Broadcom co-founder and billionaire Henry Samueli and his wife. The company was later merged out.
