= Sports Properties Acquisition Corporation =

American sports company

Sports Properties Acquisition Corporation (SPAC) is a publicly traded company who has placed a bid to purchase the Florida Panthers from Alan Cohen, and Sunrise Sports and Entertainment.

== Previous opportunities ==
SPAC sold public shares in the company and must purchase a team by January 2010, or the shares will be returned to the shareholders. They have previously been interested in the Phoenix Coyotes, and Montreal Canadiens.

== Florida Panthers Purchase ==
SPAC has offered a $240 million deal to purchase the Panthers, the BankAtlantic Center and the area surrounding the arena. Along with the land, they will acquire Alan Cohen's proposal for a $2 billion project to develop the land surrounding the arena. This project has been code named as City of Oz.

== Formation ==
SPAC includes Vice Chairman Andrew Murstein, a New York financier, and CEO/President Tony Tavares, a former president of the Washington Nationals. Tavares was also the president, and CEO of Disney Sports Enterprises, which launched the NHL's Anaheim Ducks and MLB's Anaheim Angels. Hank Aaron is also a member of this group.
