= Bill Stoneman =

American baseball player and executive (born 1944)

- Stoneman in 1974
- Pitcher
- Born: April 7, 1944 (age 82); Oak Park, Illinois, U.S.
- Batted: Right Threw: Right

MLB debut
- July 16, 1967, for the Chicago Cubs

Last MLB appearance
- June 30, 1974, for the California Angels

MLB statistics
- Win–loss record: 54–85
- Earned run average: 4.08
- Strikeouts: 934
- Stats at Baseball Reference

Teams
- As player: Chicago Cubs (1967–1968); Montreal Expos (1969–1973); California Angels (1974); As general manager: Montreal Expos (1987–1988); Anaheim / Los Angeles Angels of Anaheim (1999–2007, 2015)

Career highlights and awards
- All-Star (1972); World Series champion (2002); Pitched two no-hitters (1969, 1972); Montreal Expos Hall of Fame

Member of the Canadian

Baseball Hall of Fame
- Induction: 2026

William Hambly Stoneman III (born April 7, 1944) is an American former professional baseball player and executive. He played eight seasons in Major League Baseball as a pitcher, which saw him hurl two no-hitters, each for the Montreal Expos. He joined the front office of the Expos in 1983; he served as interim general manager of the team in 1987 and 1988. He eventually rose to vice president of baseball operations by the time he departed the team for the Anaheim Angels in 1999. He presided over the team for the next eight years that saw them reach and win the World Series for the first time in franchise history in 2002 alongside numerous division championships prior to stepping down in 2007 (he subsequently served as interim GM for three months of the 2015 season); he still serves as a consultant for the team.

== Early years ==
Born in Oak Park, Illinois, Stoneman graduated from West Covina High School in southern California in 1962. A right-handed pitcher, he spent a year at Mt. San Antonio College in Walnut, then transferred to the University of Idaho in Moscow to play college baseball, and helped the Vandals win the inaugural Big Sky title in 1964 as a sophomore. When Stoneman was a junior, the Vandals were 17–13 and he was 5–3 with a 1.80 earned run average (ERA) and averaged 1.5 strikeouts per inning.

As a senior in 1966, Stoneman was 6–2 with a 0.45 ERA in the regular season, and Idaho won the Big Sky again with a 31–7 (.816) record in the regular season. Invited to the NCAA playoffs for the first time, they eliminated Colorado State College (now Northern Colorado) and Air Force on the road in Greeley, Colorado. The Vandals were one step from the College World Series in Omaha, but lost to Arizona in Tucson in the District 7 finals, today's "Super-Regionals" (Sweet 16). Idaho ended their best-ever season at 34–9 (.791).

Stoneman received his bachelor's degree from Idaho in 1966, and a master's degree from the University of Oklahoma. While at Idaho, he was an active member of Beta Theta Pi fraternity.

== Professional career ==
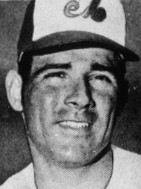
Stoneman in 1973

The Chicago Cubs selected Stoneman in the 31st round of the 1966 Major League Baseball draft with the 595th overall selection. After signing, Stoneman pitched at three minor-league classifications in 1966, with Rookie-level Caldwell, Single-A Lodi, and Double-A Dallas-Fort Worth. He started 1967 in Double-A and, after five games pitched, moved to Triple-A Tacoma.

The Cubs called up Stoneman to the major leagues in mid-season of 1967. He debuted as a starting pitcher with back-to-back assignments against the San Francisco Giants on July 16 and 21, allowing three total runs in 92/3 innings but gaining no decisions, although the Cubs won both games. Manager Leo Durocher then shifted Stoneman to the bullpen, where he made 26 appearances as a relief pitcher. He ended his rookie MLB campaign with a 3.29 earned run average, four saves and 52 strikeouts in 63 innings pitched. But he was less effective in 1968, with his ERA climbing to 5.52 in only 291/3 innings of work, and spent part of the season back at Triple-A Tacoma.

In the expansion draft of October 1968, Stoneman was selected by the Montreal Expos, where he spent five seasons and became a full-time starter for manager Gene Mauch. He threw his two no-hitters with the Expos: the first against the Philadelphia Phillies at Connie Mack Stadium on April 17, 1969. It was Stoneman's fifth major league start and only the ninth game of the franchise's existence; he had eight strikeouts and five walks. The second came at the end of the 1972 season on October 2, when he defeated the New York Mets in Montreal at Jarry Park, caught by Tim McCarver. The latter was the first major league no-hitter in Canada, and both were 7–0 scores. The second included nine strikeouts and seven walks. Stoneman also threw a one-hitter at home in 1971 against the San Diego Padres, a well-attended 2–0 win on Helmet Night on Wednesday, June 16. In perhaps the best outing of his career, Stoneman struck out 14 and allowed just one base on balls. The only hit came with one out in the seventh inning, a clean single to right field off the bat of Cito Gaston, which was the Padres' only well-struck ball of the night. He was named to the National League All-Star Team in 1972 and pitched two innings in relief with two strikeouts.

At 5 ft 10 in (1.78 m) tall and 170 lb (77 kg), Stoneman was a workhorse who over four consecutive seasons (1969–1972) logged more than 200 innings pitched. He struck out 251 in 295 innings in 1971, with a 17–16 record and a 3.15 ERA for non-contending Montreal(71–90 (.441)). That season, Stoneman also finished third in strikeouts in the National League, behind Tom Seaver (289) and Ferguson Jenkins (263), and his 39 starts tied for the league-high with Jenkins. He also had 20 complete games in 1971, tied for third with Bob Gibson. His career was shortened by an arm injury in 1973: his earned run average ballooned from 2.98 in 1972 to 6.80 (1973), then 6.10 (1974), for a record of only 5–16 in that span.

Overall, Stoneman won 54 games and lost 85 (.388), with an ERA of 4.08 in 245 appearances. For his career he had 169 starts, 45 complete games, and 934 strikeouts in 1,2361/3 innings.

As a batter, Stoneman holds the record with most consecutive games played with at least one strikeout. From April 30, 1971, to April 21, 1972, Stoneman played in 37 consecutive games with at least one strikeout in an at bat. He was left in to bat in the 1972 All-Star Game against Gaylord Perry, where, he struck out in the bottom of the seventh inning. In 338 regular season at bats, Stoneman struck out 212 times and compiled a career batting average of .086 with 25 singles, 4 extra-base hits (all doubles), and 23 walks. Despite that strikeout streak, his best season batting average was .129 in 1971. The strikeout streak record was tied by New York Yankees outfielder Aaron Judge in 2017.

In 2026 Stoneman was inducted into the Canadian Baseball Hall of Fame.

== Front office career ==
After his playing career ended, Stoneman worked in banking in Canada, then joined the Montreal Expos' front office in November 1983, starting out in player relations. He became the team's vice president of business operations in September 1984, and later served as the club's general manager in 1987 and 1988.

Returning to Southern California, Stoneman became general manager of the Angels after the 1999 season. He hired Mike Scioscia as the club's manager and presided over its 2002 American League title and World Series championship — the first pennant and World Series championship in the club's 42-year history to that point. He remained in office through the Angels' ownership transition from the Walt Disney Company to Arturo Moreno. During his tenure, the team also won American League West Division titles in 2004, 2005 and 2007. Stoneman stepped down as GM following the 2007 season.

On July 1, 2015, Angels general manager Jerry DiPoto resigned following a power struggle with manager Mike Scioscia. Stoneman was brought in as interim GM while the team looked for a full-time replacement. Billy Eppler was hired as the full-time replacement on October 4, 2015.

=== Record as general manager ===
Team	Year	Regular season					Postseason			
Team	Year	Games	Won	Lost	Win %	Finish	Won	Lost	Win %	Result
MTL	1987	50	29	21	.580	3rd in NL East	–	–	–	–
MTL	1988	163	81	81	.500	3rd in NL East	–	–	–	–
MTL total		213	110	102	.519					
ANA	2000	162	82	80	.506	3rd in AL West	–	–	–	–
ANA	2001	162	75	87	.463	3rd in AL West	–	–	–	–
ANA	2002	162	99	63	.611	2nd in AL West	11	5	.688	Won World Series (SF)
ANA	2003	162	77	85	.475	3rd in AL West	–	–	–	–
ANA	2004	162	92	70	.568	1st in AL West	0	3	.000	Lost ALDS (BOS)
LAA	2005	162	95	67	.586	1st in AL West	4	6	.400	Lost ALCS (CHW)
LAA	2006	162	89	73	.549	2nd in AL West	–	–	–	
LAA	2007	162	94	68	.580	1st in AL West	0	3	.000	Lost ALDS (BOS)
LAA	2015	83	44	39	.530	3rd in AL West	–	–	–	–
ANA/LAA total		1,379	747	632	.542		15	17	.469	
Total		1,592	857	734	.539		15	17	.469	

== See also ==
- List of Major League Baseball no-hitters

Achievements
Preceded by Ray Washburn; Milt Pappas	No-hitter pitcher April 17, 1969; October 2, 1972	Succeeded by Jim Maloney; Steve Busby
Sporting positions
Preceded by Murray Cook	Montreal Expos General Manager; 1987–1988	Succeeded by Dave Dombrowski
Preceded by Bill Bavasi	Anaheim/Los Angeles Angels General Manager; 1999–2007	Succeeded by Tony Reagins
