= Phoenix Coyotes bankruptcy and sale =

Legal issues of the professional ice hockey team

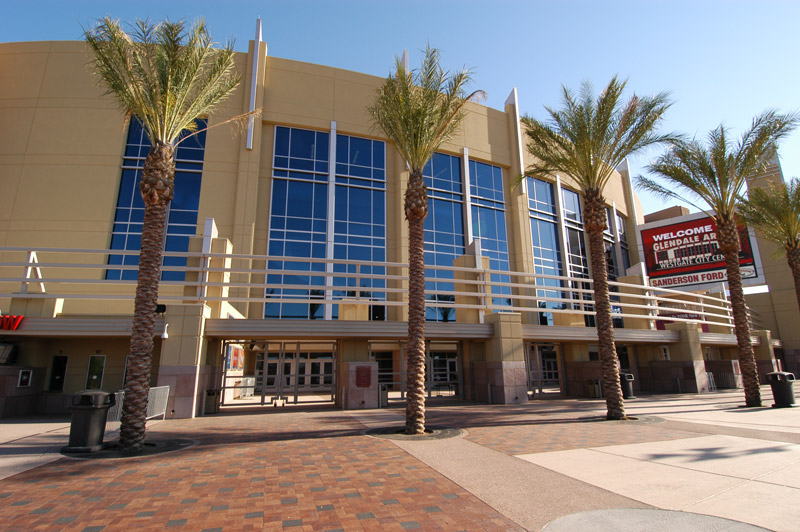
Gila River Arena, formerly known as Jobing.com Arena, former home of the Coyotes. The lease agreement of the Arena was cited as one reason for the bankruptcy of the franchise.

The Phoenix Coyotes, a professional ice hockey team of the National Hockey League (NHL), and known as the Arizona Coyotes from 2014 until suspending operations in 2024, filed for bankruptcy in 2009 after incurring several hundred million dollars of losses since their move to Phoenix, Arizona from Winnipeg, Manitoba, where they were known as the Winnipeg Jets. A bankruptcy court rejected a plan to sell the team and move it to Hamilton, Ontario, Canada, and the team was later purchased by the NHL. The NHL operated the team in Phoenix for four seasons while seeking a new owner. After several failed prospective purchases, the team was finally sold in the summer of 2013.

== Summary ==
In December 2008, the media reported that the Phoenix Coyotes were losing money at a high rate and were being directly funded by the NHL. The media reports were minimized by NHL commissioner Gary Bettman and deputy commissioner Bill Daly, but secretly the NHL had taken control of team operations. In May 2009, team owner Jerry Moyes placed the team in bankruptcy hours before Bettman was planning to present a potential purchase offer. Moyes intended to sell the team to Canadian billionaire Jim Balsillie, who wished to move it to Hamilton, Ontario without being restricted by the NHL's relocation rules.

From May until September 2009, hearings were held in Phoenix bankruptcy court to determine the fate of the Coyotes and the holding company. Two potential bidders for the team surfaced—Chicago Bulls and White Sox owner Jerry Reinsdorf and Ice Edge Holdings, Inc.—but they did not submit bids. The NHL placed the only rival bid to that of Balsillie while fighting Moyes' plan. The Phoenix court ruled that the team could not be sold to Balsillie, as bankruptcy could not be used to subvert the league's rules. The NHL's original bid was also deemed insufficient by the bankruptcy judge, as it did not treat Moyes and Gretzky as full creditors. The NHL later settled with Moyes, with the league buying the team and assuming all debts in the process.

After the sale, the NHL negotiated a temporary lease with the city of Glendale, Arizona, owner of Jobing.com Arena (now known as Gila River Arena). The NHL then worked with the two potential bidders, Reinsdorf and Ice Edge, to arrange a deal with Glendale. Ice Edge signed a letter of intent to buy the team from the NHL while Reinsdorf won the city's approval. By the end of the summer of 2010, both bidders had failed to complete a purchase and withdrew. The NHL, which had threatened to move the team to Winnipeg for the 2010–11 season, agreed to keep the team in Glendale for the season after the city agreed to fund its losses. The NHL publicly announced a deadline of December 31, 2010 for any purchase to keep the team in Phoenix, after which it might make plans to move the team. In December 2010, Chicago-based investor Matthew Hulsizer, along with several investors, was approved by the NHL to purchase the team and reached a lease agreement with Glendale. A deal was reached between Glendale and Hulsizer that involved the sale of bonds by the city to pay Hulsizer more than $100 million against future parking revenues at the arena. The Goldwater Institute, a think tank and litigation center, announced that it would challenge the lease agreement in court, and the threat led to the failure of the bond sale. Hulsizer abandoned his bid for the Coyotes on June 27, 2011.

For the 2011–12 season, Glendale set aside $25 million to ensure that the Coyotes would stay in Glendale for another season, while the NHL worked on arranging the purchase. In August 2011, a group headed by former San Jose Sharks CEO Greg Jamison, which intended to keep the team in Arizona, was identified as a potential purchaser. Another group, including past bidder Reinsdorf, emerged in September 2011. The city of Glendale intended to complete negotiations with one or the other by the end of December 2011, but no deal was forthcoming. In May 2012, the NHL announced a tentative agreement with Jamison's group and hoped to complete the sale "within weeks". In June, a lease agreement between Jamison and Glendale was reached, but a clause forbidding the placement of the agreement on the November municipal election ballot was rejected in court. A minimum number of petition signers were required to add the referendum to the ballot, but in July, Glendale rejected petitions as being delivered late and without enough signatures. The lease agreement was eventually revised and approved by Glendale in November 2012. On January 31, 2013, Jamison stated that he would be unable to complete the sale of the Coyotes under the terms of the lease signed in November 2012.

In May 2013, a new group was formed to purchase the team. Renaissance Sports & Entertainment (RS&E), which included investors who had submitted a previous offer, struck a deal with the NHL to purchase the team for $225 million. The deal required an arena lease agreement with the city of Glendale. The NHL informed the city that it would be the last potential sale to keep the team in Glendale, and arranged to move the team to Seattle in case a deal could not be reached. By a 4–3 vote in a July 2, 2013 city-council meeting, Glendale agreed to accept a deal with RS&E. The deal kept the team in Glendale for a guaranteed minimum of five years, with a maximum lease lasting for more than 15 years. The team would also change its name from the Phoenix Coyotes to the Arizona Coyotes. On August 5, 2013, the NHL Board of Governors approved the sale of the Coyotes to RS&E.

== Warning signs ==
On December 8, 2009, during a press conference at the annual December NHL board of governors' meeting, the issue of the state of the economy was raised by reporters. The Coyotes were reported to lose as much as $35 million during the 2008–09 season. Asked to comment on Phoenix's loss, Bettman was quoted as saying, "They're going to get through the season just fine." Coyotes president and COO Doug Moss admitted that the team had lost a great deal of money and was continuing to do so. He also refused to reveal the number of season-ticket subscribers: "We have never really revealed our season-ticket base ... it's too low, that's a number that's too low." It was revealed during bankruptcy proceedings that the Coyotes averaged 5,450 season tickets per season for the four seasons from 2005 to 2009.

In documents filed with the Phoenix bankruptcy court, the NHL stated that the league took official control of the team on November 14, 2008. The league then began advancing money to the club from league revenues and extended a $44.5 million loan to the team in February 2009 for the full season. The league fired Coyotes CEO Jeff Shumway and dismissed 18 team employees. Moyes' documents filed with the court indicated that the team had lost $73 million over the past three years and that the projected loss was $45 million for 2008–09. In the September 2009 bankruptcy hearings, it was noted that an audit had shown that the team had never made a profit since moving from Winnipeg, Manitoba in 1996 and had lost $54.8 million in 2008 alone.

On December 23, 2008, The Globe and Mail reported that the Coyotes were receiving financial assistance from the league in the form of advances on league revenues. The Coyotes pledged all of their assets to New York company SOF Investments LP to cover an estimated debt of $80 million. The team had lost an estimated $200 million since 2001 and in recent years had posted heavy losses, including $41.6 million in 2006–07, $37.3 million during the 2007–08 season and $54 million in 2008–09. One of the team's owners and Jerry Moyes' principal source of revenue, Swift Transportation, was also experiencing financial difficulty. Television network ESPN reported that the league had become involved with the operations of the Coyotes and that Moyes was interested in selling his share of the team. Hollywood producer and hockey fan Jerry Bruckheimer was cited as a possible investor.

== Bankruptcy filing ==
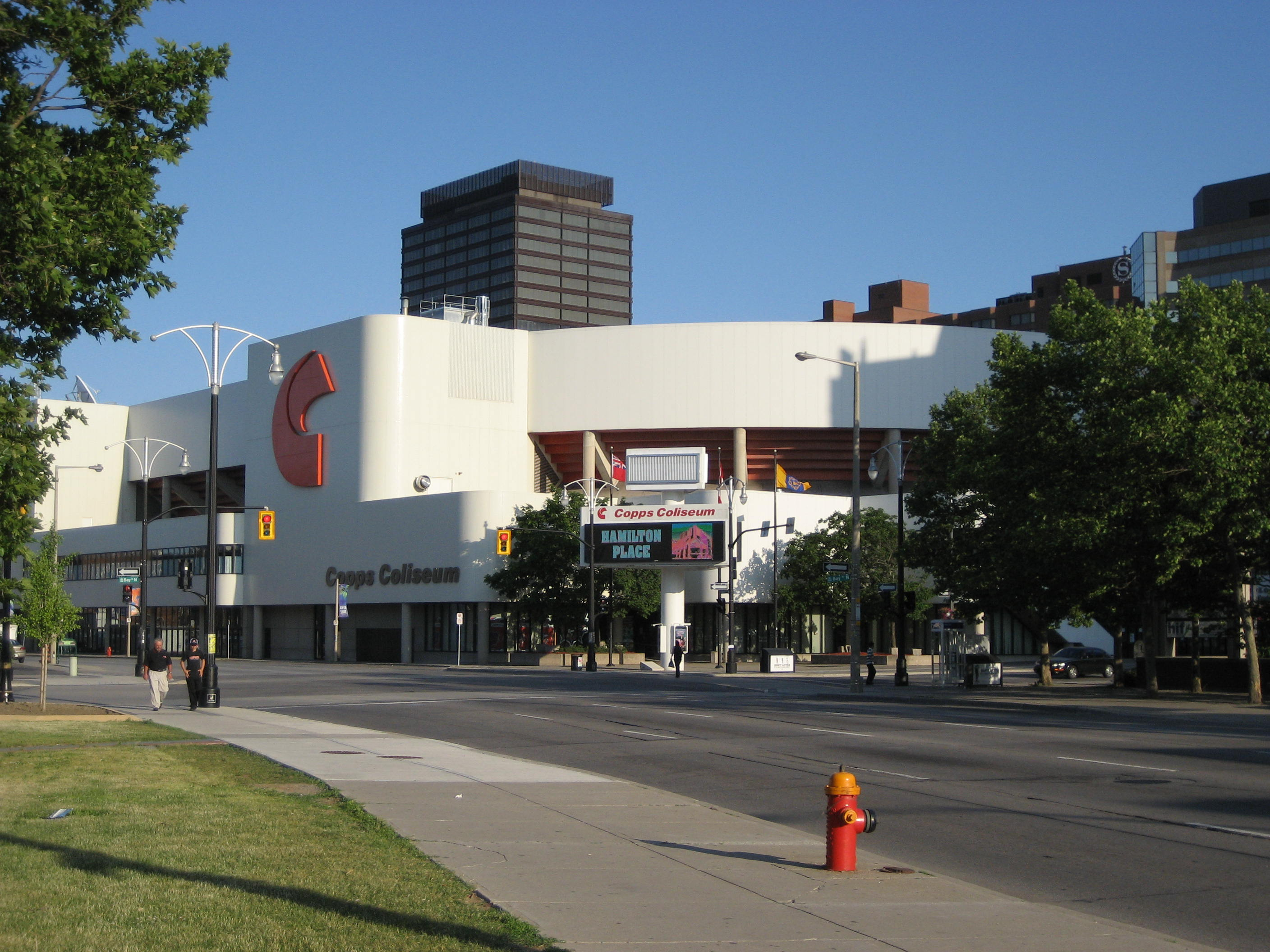
Copps Coliseum, now FirstOntario Centre, in Hamilton, Ontario.

On May 5, 2009, the Coyotes' holding company, Dewey Ranch Hockey LLC, filed for Chapter 11 bankruptcy. In a statement, Moyes announced that he had agreed in principle to sell the team to PSE Sports and Entertainment, headed by Research in Motion co-CEO Jim Balsillie, for $212.5 million. As part of the deal, Balsillie intended to move the Coyotes to Hamilton, Ontario. Although initial reports said that Balsillie was considering Kitchener as well, Hamilton already had an NHL-sized arena in place, Copps Coliseum (now FirstOntario Centre), and Balsillie was already in talks with city officials to secure a lease for the arena. Balsillie had previously made unsuccessful approaches to purchase the Pittsburgh Penguins and Nashville Predators, with the intent of relocating either team to Hamilton.

Any potential purchasers who wished to submit a counteroffer had to exceed Balsillie's bid by at least $5 million. At Moyes' request, Balsillie agreed to post debtor-in-possession financing of $17 million. Balsillie also launched public-relations campaigns such as the creation of the web site makeitseven.ca to build public support in Canada for his purchase and transfer of the Coyotes to Hamilton.

The announcement was as a surprise to the NHL and even to Coyotes staffers. Bettman had helped broker a deal that would have seen the Coyotes sold to Chicago Bulls and White Sox owner Jerry Reinsdorf. At the time of the announcement, Bettman was in Phoenix to present the deal to Moyes. Unlike Balsillie's offer, the Reinsdorf deal would have kept the Coyotes in Arizona. Terms of the Reinsdorf deal were not disclosed, but The Sports Network's Bob McKenzie speculated that it was almost certainly less than the Balsillie offer.

The NHL responded by stripping Moyes of virtually all of his ownership authority, although he remained the owner in title. Bettman said that Moyes may not have had the authority to file the bankruptcy petition and may not have even had full control of the team by virtue of the massive financial assistance that he had received. Although it has been widely speculated that southern Ontario is a large enough market to support a third NHL team alongside the Toronto Maple Leafs and Ottawa Senators (and with the Buffalo Sabres and Detroit Red Wings just across the border), Bettman suggested that it was unlikely that the league would approve any plan to move the Coyotes to Canada, and accused Moyes and Balsillie of attempting to circumvent league rules. He also reiterated that the NHL was committed to the Phoenix area.

== Bankruptcy hearings ==
The first bankruptcy hearing was scheduled for May 7, 2009. Court documents submitted by Moyes cite 30 creditors, including Moyes himself, for an amount in excess of US$103 million. TSN's Bob McKenzie said that Moyes was very receptive to Balsillie's offer because, as the team's largest unsecured creditor, the best chance of recouping most of his money was to persuade someone to buy the team from bankruptcy. The league's position was that it was Moyes' fault that he paid himself so much money and that he was entitled to only $14 million of the $103 million loss, which would have been the case if Reinsdorf's lower bid had been accepted.

At the bankruptcy hearing, the NHL argued that it had been in control of the team since November by virtue of a proxy agreement with Moyes. The NHL claimed this agreement, and several others signed by Moyes, specifically barred Moyes from filing for bankruptcy. Moyes claimed that the agreement only gave the league voting rights, not outright control. Bankruptcy court judge Redfield Baum scheduled a second hearing for May 19 to determine who actually controlled the team. However, Daly said that regardless of how the judge ruled, the league owners would have the final say in whether to allow the Coyotes to move. Daly repeated Bettman's doubts about Balsillie's bid, saying Balsillie was acting "in total disregard" for NHL rules.

At the May 19 hearing, Baum ordered the NHL and Moyes to settle the ownership question through mediation, while expressing skepticism for the NHL's argument that the proxy agreements gave it control of the team. He said that he needed to decide whether to allow the move to Hamilton before the franchise was sold. However, the NHL claimed there was no way it could reach a decision on whether to allow the move in time for the 2009–10 season. The day after the hearing, Balsillie spokesman Rich Rodier told Arizona Republic Coyotes beat writer Jim Gintonio that Balsillie was willing to keep the team in Phoenix for the 2009–10 season, provided that the NHL fund any losses.

Although the judge ordered mediation, none took place. In late May, Balsillie filed a formal application with the NHL to purchase the Coyotes and relocate them to Hamilton. Baum set up a tentative hearing to consider an auction of the team if the NHL Board of Governors rejected Balsillie's bid.

The other three major North American sports organizations filed amicus curiae briefs with the court supporting the NHL position. They argued that if Baum forced the league to move the Coyotes, it would "disrupt the business" of professional sports. New York's two senators, Chuck Schumer and Kirsten Gillibrand, also wrote Baum to oppose the move on the grounds that a Hamilton-based team would do severe economic harm to the Sabres. According to the senators, 15 to 20 percent of the Sabres' revenues comes from fans in the area between Hamilton and Buffalo. Hamilton is only 45 miles from Buffalo, New York and is within the "protected N.H.L. markets" of both the Sabres and the Maple Leafs.

The NHL filed documents stating that four prospective buyers had filed applications with the league. All four intended to keep the Coyotes in Phoenix. These included Jerry Reinsdorf, Toronto Argonauts' co-owners Howard Sokolowski and David Cynamon; and John Breslow of Las Vegas, who was already an owner of 3% of the Coyotes. A fourth remained anonymous. The league stated that any franchise moved without the league's permission, such as moving it to Hamilton would render it valueless. "At most, the proposed transaction would transfer a collection of used hockey equipment — none of which could bear the NHL logo."

At a June 9, 2009 hearing, Judge Baum agreed with the NHL that the league is within its rights to demand a relocation fee. Balsillie lawyer Richard Rodier suggested that the league would set the fee as high as $100 million to dissuade Balsillie. Balsillie himself was quoted as saying that he was open to paying the fee, although his lawyers suggested that he would walk away from the deal if the fee is 'exorbitant.'

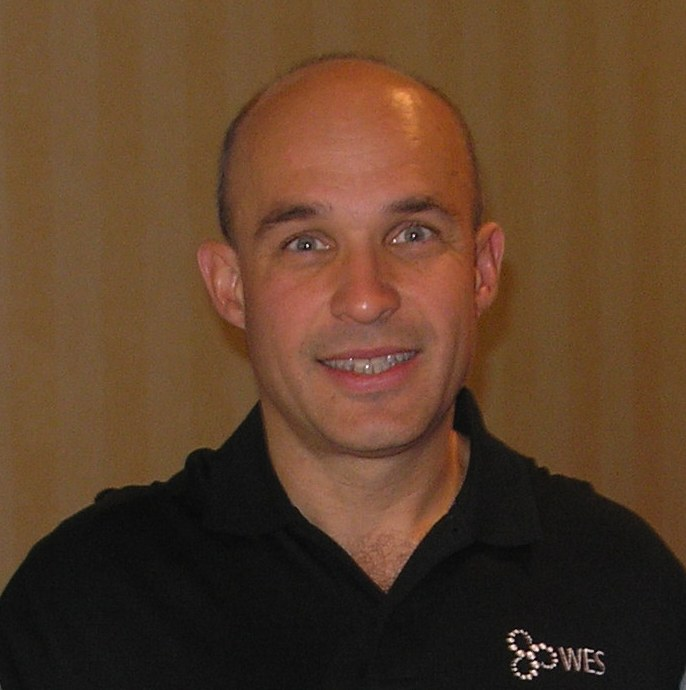
Canadian businessman Jim Balsillie

On June 15, Baum ruled against Balsillie's proposal, stating that the timeline imposed by Balsillie was unrealistic and did not provide enough time for the courts or the NHL to wade through the issues posed by the relocation. Baum also rejected the proposal in part due to the fact that Balsillie's offer did not include any relocation fee to the NHL, to which they would be entitled since southern Ontario is potentially a more lucrative market than Phoenix. In the ruling, the judge also dismissed claims made by Moyes and Balsillie's lawyers that the NHL was violating antitrust laws in not allowing the move. The ruling effectively ended any chance of the Coyotes moving for the 2009–10 season.

Baum's ruling did not rule out Balsillie as an NHL franchise owner. Balsillie indicated at the time that he would continue bidding on the team in spite of the failure of his first offer. The NHL indicated a desire to hold an auction in September to find a new owner for the team, indicating that the auction would be open to prospective owners who would keep the team in Arizona, and stated that at least four potential buyers had been identified. The league had also indicated a willingness to hold a second auction, open to relocation, if the team could not be sold in the planned September auction.

On July 9, the Court set two auction dates for the team. The first auction on August 20, would be a primary auction with the stipulation that whoever has the winning bid, must agree to keep the team in Phoenix for at least 5 years, after which they may relocate with league approval at any time. An undisclosed minimum bid must be met in this auction. Should this auction fail, the second auction on September 10, will be run with no minimum bid; in which the new owner will have the right and authority to move the team to another location at any time without league approval after the 2009–10 season. Balsillie stated that he was willing to keep the team in Phoenix for the time being and intended to bid in the August auction.

On July 29, the NHL Board of Governors met to consider the application of Balsillie to purchase the Coyotes and the relocation. The Governors voted overwhelmingly 29–1 against Balsillie (unanimously except for Moyes' representative). The board also voted to approve Reinsdorf as a potential owner. Daly stated that Balsillie was rejected under bylaw 35 of the NHL Constitution, which allows applications to be rejected to persons which the NHL believes are not of "good character and integrity." Balsillie responded in a filing saying that "the NHL has long tolerated indicted and even convicted criminals among its ranks", noting that moral grounds and questions of character have never been used "in the entire history of the NHL to reject any applicant."

The NHL also revealed another bid, by businessman Anthony LeBlanc of Thunder Bay, Ontario, to purchase the Coyotes, which they also rejected as "incomplete" but encouraged LeBlanc to pursue the bid. LeBlanc's company, Ice Edge Holdings Inc., publicly revealed its bid with a letter of intent filed with the bankruptcy court. The club would bid as much as $150 million for the team and keep it in Phoenix, with as many as five games played annually in Saskatoon, Saskatchewan. Ice Edge also named Canadian businessman Daryl Jones as one of its principals.

On August 13, 2009, Judge Baum ordered the NHL to surrender documents regarding the Coyotes' relocation. These documents were related to any potential expansion to Hamilton and any relocation fees charged for franchise moves by the NHL. Documents filed with the court included the previously secret NHL constitution and also the section of the NHL bylaws that dictated the rules regarding relocation fees. Balsillie's lawyers filed the documents, claiming that sections of the constitution violated antitrust law, and asked that the judge ignore the rules of the NHL on that basis.

On September 6, 2009, it was reported by the Toronto Star that the NHL had set a potential relocation fee of $101 million to $195 million to move the Coyotes to Hamilton, while economics professor Andrew Zimbalist, in a study conducted for Balsillie, valued the move at $11.2 million to $12.9 million. On September 7, 2009, Balsillie had reportedly raised his offer by US$40–50 million to pay the remainder of the lease with Glendale Arena.

On September 9, 2009, it was reported that both Reinsdorf and Ice Edge Holdings had withdrawn from the bidding, leaving only Balsillie and the NHL as prospective purchasers. It was announced on September 24 that Wayne Gretzky had resigned as head coach.

On September 30, 2009, Judge Baum rejected both bids. This effectively ended any chance of a forced sale to Balsillie and relocation of the Coyotes to Canada. However, the NHL's bid was criticized for its failure to repay Moyes and Gretzky, two of the largest creditors, although the league had a chance to improve its bid. While Balsillie's bid treated both as full creditors, the NHL promised Moyes only about $14 million of his claimed losses of $104 million, which would be shared with Gretzky, who had a claim of about $22 million.

== Sale to the NHL and failed purchases ==
On October 26, 2009, Jerry Moyes reached a deal to sell the Coyotes to the NHL for $140 million. On the deal, Daly stated "it remains the NHL's intention upon taking control of the club, to stabilize the club's operations and, as quickly as possible, to resell the club to a new owner who is committed to operating the club in the Glendale/Phoenix market". The sale was finalized on November 3, 2009. The price included $36.3 million already owed to the NHL, $80.7 million in secured claims and $11.3 cash going to the seller. $2 million went for professional fees and the NHL paid $11.6 million in unsecured claims, although not those of Moyes' family. The agreement also lowered a $30 million guaranty by Moyes to $15 million. If the team is resold within two years, the bankrupt estate will receive the net profit. The NHL agreed to pay the modified arena lease until June.

Since securing ownership of the team the league openly stated that it was in negotiations with Ice Edge Holdings, LeBlanc's partnership of Canadian and Phoenix-area businessmen, but was rumored to have resumed negotiations with Reinsdorf also. The Ice Edge bid, while planning to keep the team in Phoenix, also proposed to play five Coyotes home games in Saskatoon each season as part of a five-year plan to return the Coyotes to profitability.

A new prospective purchaser for the team appeared in late November 2009. Steve Stotland, a Montreal businessman, was reported to be teaming with undisclosed local investors to prepare a bid to buy the team. Stotland had previously been involved with the Washington Capitals and was interested in purchasing the Montreal Canadiens in 2000. Stotland attended the November 12 game between the Coyotes and Canadiens and met with team management.

In December 2009, the NHL announced that Ice Edge Holdings had signed a letter of intent with the NHL to purchase the Coyotes. Ice Edge would still have to negotiate a lease agreement with the City of Glendale, and get its ownership approved by the NHL Board of Governors.

That same month of December 2009, the NHL discussed the purchase of the Coyotes with True North Sports and Entertainment (TNSE), owners of the Winnipeg-based Manitoba Moose, as a back-up plan to move the team to Winnipeg with the understanding that the NHL would make all possible efforts to keep the team in Glendale. TNSE had been seeking an NHL team to fill its MTS Centre since 2007. The agreement became public knowledge in March 2010 when it was reported in the media that the league had negotiated an agreement-in-principle to sell the team to TNSE, in the event negotiations to keep the team in Arizona fail. (True North subsequently purchased the Atlanta Thrashers and relocated the franchise to Winnipeg for the 2011–12 season.)

By March 2010, the NHL had not finished the sale to Ice Edge. It was reported that Ice Edge had run into trouble securing sufficient financing although the group denied the claims. The NHL launched a lawsuit for $61 million against former Coyotes owner Jerry Moyes to recover $10 million in bankruptcy court costs, $20 million in losses for 2009–10 and $11.6 million owed to creditors. On May 10, 2010, the lawsuit was transferred from New York to Arizona. Moyes is planning to move for dismissal of the case. It was reported in December 2010, that the court is considering Moyes motion to dismiss the case.

On April 9, 2010, the City of Glendale announced that it had received two offers to purchase the Coyotes, with Memorandums of Understanding from both Ice Edge Holdings and Glendale Hockey (headed by Chicago Bulls and Chicago White Sox owner Jerry Reinsdorf). The MOU's would both keep the team based in Glendale's Jobing.com Arena. Both groups would change the name of the team from Phoenix Coyotes to Arizona or Glendale Coyotes.

Reinsdorf's memorandum proposed a "community facilities district" that would sell bonds and collect revenue. The city would pay the NHL up to US$65 million in three-year increments – $21.6 million the first year, $21.6 million the second year and $21.8 million the third year. This was immediately objected to by the Goldwater Institute, stating that it placed undue risk on the City of Glendale and Reinsdorf took none of the risk. Ice Edge's proposal, which required annual fees of $5 million in parking revenues, was more acceptable to the Institute.

On April 13, 2010, the City of Glendale, at a weekly council meeting, approved Reinsdorf's proposal by a vote of 6–0 while rejecting Ice Edge Holdings' proposal 5–1. The agreement included a special tax district surrounding the arena, expected to generate $47 million annually from businesses in support of the team. The agreement allowed Reinsdorf the option to move the team after five years if revenues are not up to expectations. John Kaites, an attorney for Reinsdorf and a partner in the Glendale Hockey, LLC group has claimed the out-clause to be an "assessment period". Former Coyotes CEO Jeff Shumway criticized the deal, saying that the team would not have gone bankrupt if the same deal had been available two years earlier. Reinsdorf's bid, which will pay the NHL $65 million for the team, has to be approved by the league board of governors. After the vote, Bettman was quoted as characterizing the Glendale vote as a "terrific step" and that he anticipated that the league would have no problems in approving Reinsdorf's purchase, including the 5-year 'out clause'. Bettman declined to give a timetable for the purchase approval.

On May 7, 2010, The Globe and Mail reported that negotiations to finalize the details of the MOU between Reinsdorf and Glendale were going poorly and Glendale had sought out Ice Edge to return to negotiations. What is reported to be in dispute are the terms of the special tax district. The Arizona Republic reported that negotiations had resumed with Ice Edge, with Glendale removing its objection to guaranteeing $5 million in revenues from parking for the team. Scott Burnside of ESPN characterized the Reinsdorf deal as "dead", and that Glendale must agree to some conditions of the NHL's such as guaranteeing operating losses before any sale to Ice Edge. On May 10, it was reported that negotiations between Glendale and Ice Edge had broken down.

Glendale, which plans to cut its 2010–11 budget by $14.7 million through cost-cutting, faced an NHL-imposed deadline during the negotiations. The NHL could sell the team and move it if a deal is not done by July 1, 2010. At a May 11, 2010 meeting, Glendale City Council voted to extend the sales period by agreeing to fund the team's losses for the 2010–11 season (up to a maximum of $25 million) if the team is not sold by July 1. The NHL, which had drawn up a schedule with the team playing in Winnipeg, as a back-up plan, required the condition to continue the team in Phoenix. Daly appeared at the Council meeting, stating that the sale of the Coyotes is still expected to close by the end of June and the payments may never be needed. Glendale city manager Ed Beasley stated that both Reinsdorf and the Ice Edge group were still in the running to purchase the team. The decision also gave Beasley the authority to set up a 'Community Facilities District' around the arena. The District would collect fees, possibly including ticket surcharges and parking charges, that would be directed to the hockey club. According to the TNSE's Mark Chipman, Glendale wired the $25 million in funds to the NHL ten minutes before a 5 PM deadline set by the NHL on an unspecified date in May 2010, narrowly averting the transfer of the team to Winnipeg. The TNSE had a group of executives in New York negotiating with the NHL.

On June 4, 2010, Glendale announced that it had a new Memorandum of Understanding with Ice Edge. The new MOU had a new clause whereby Ice Edge can exit its agreement with Glendale. To retain negotiating rights with Glendale, Ice Edge was given ten days to provide legal assurances from its bankers showing it can borrow the money it needs and the $25 million fund for the NHL. Reinsdorf responded to the announcement by announcing that he was withdrawing from the bidding, saying "it was time to move on."

A lease agreement with Ice Edge was not finalized and negotiations between Ice Edge and the City of Glendale reached an impasse in July 2010. Ice Edge's financing of the Coyotes' purchase was an issue, and the city required financial statements showing Ice Edge could afford to purchase and run the Coyotes. Ice Edge delivered statements in June 2010 but these were considered unsatisfactory by the city. At the end of August, Ice Edge announced that it would focus its efforts instead on getting an ECHL team in Thunder Bay, Ontario.

Although the team had a successful season, reaching 100 points for the first time to finish fourth in their conference, and earning their first playoff berth since 2001–2002, attendance remained poor. The NHL shook up the Coyotes' front office in July 2010. Moss who had been president and chief operating officer of the club since 2002 was let go, being replaced by Chief financial officer Mike Nealy who was promoted to chief operating officer. This was followed by the departure of vice-president Jeff Holbrook, who would be succeeded by former Phoenix Suns executive Jim Brewer in August 2010.

== Failed sale to Matthew Hulsizer ==
In September 2010, it was reported that Matthew Hulsizer, the Chicago chief executive of options-trading firm PEAK6 had reached a preliminary lease arrangement with the City of Glendale. His proposal would see Ice Edge have a minority interest in the team. Glendale Council received a briefing on the proposal on September 7, 2010. City council was hopeful of reaching a deal with Hulsizer before September 15, but according to Councilman Manny Martinez, the negotiations would not be completed and voted on by then. The date is the first date that the NHL can start billing Glendale for Coyotes' costs from the $25 million set aside by Glendale.

It was reported on September 17 that Hulsizer had deposited $25 million into the Glendale escrow account, as a sign of "good faith". Glendale declined to name Hulsizer, for confidentiality reasons. In its statement, Glendale stated "is moving forward with the prospective buyer for the purchase of the Phoenix Coyotes, subject to the negotiations and approval of the prospective buyer and the purchase price of the NHL." The statement was later clarified that Hulsizer put $25 million into escrow as a sign of good faith and that his funds were not to be used to pay the NHL's bills running the Coyotes.

On October 9, 2010, the Arizona Republic reported that negotiations between Hulsizer and Glendale were at an impasse. Hulsizer was reportedly pursuing a purchase of the team with the NHL first, without negotiating a lease to play in Glendale. Hulsizer has to negotiate a price that may or may not include paying for this season's NHL expenses. According to Glendale mayor Elaine Scruggs, "Glendale has done everything we can to negotiate with the latest buyer. It is truly out of our hands right now.".

On October 15, the Toronto The Globe and Mail newspaper reported that purchase negotiations between Hulsizer and the NHL had reached an impasse. According to the report, Hulsizer has demanded a discount on the $165 million asking price of the NHL, while the NHL is unwilling to lose money in the transaction, and that the NHL may increase the asking price if it has invested further money into the team. The Globe reports that Hulsizer's escrow account deposit came from an investment bank, and not from Hulsizer himself. According to an unnamed NHL governor, the NHL governors do not want the franchise to return to Winnipeg but will approve the move if the deal is not completed by December 31. That same day, Glendale released a statement on its web site announcing that the city had reached an agreement in principle on a lease with the Hulsizer group. Daly told TSN that "the next step will be proceeding to the NHL ownership approval process. We are hopeful this represents the beginning of the end of this long process."

Hulsizer attended the October 16, 2010 Coyotes' home game versus the Detroit Red Wings and discussed the team with general manager Don Maloney and coach Dave Tippett. He spoke publicly for the first time about the purchase stating that he had verbally agreed with the NHL on the purchase price: "Buying a hockey team is like buying a piece of art. You don't do it to make a lot of money. You do it because you love it." The agreement with Glendale is also an oral agreement and the agreement was to be discussed at Glendale council on October 19 behind closed doors.

Hulsizer attended a November 10, 2010, Coyotes game against the Blackhawks in Chicago. Although poor attendance at some games at Jobing.com Arena had led to negative speculation, Hulsizer confirmed that the "process is moving forward" and that "something will be announced imminently." Some media speculation had stated that an escape clause with Glendale was a sticking point in negotiations. Hulsizer spoke to Fox Sports Arizona and he stated that the City of Glendale "has been excellent to work with." By November 23, 2010, the lease between Glendale and Hulsizer had not been discussed publicly by Glendale city council.

On December 6, 2010, Hulsizer met with members of the NHL's executive committee at the NHL owner's winter meetings. The executive committee approved Hulsizer as a potential owner. At the same time, the NHL again came to an agreement with TNSE for a possible purchase and move of the team to Winnipeg should the eventuality come to pass.

Under the announced agreement, the city of Glendale intended to buy back the parking rights to the arena from the Coyotes at a price of $100 million, and manage the arena at an annual cost of $17 million for the next five and a half years, (totalling $97 million) at which point Hulsizer has the option to buy the arena for $140 million. Glendale hoped to host the 2013 NHL All-Star Game, but the game was instead awarded to Columbus. The $100 million would be raised by a bond issue by the city. The lease would run until 2033, at which point Hulsizer could purchase the arena for $40 million. The Coyotes would make payments totalling $6 million annually to the city. Also under the agreement, the Coyotes would apply to the NHL to rename the team the "Arizona Coyotes".

Glendale council approved the lease agreement on December 14, 2010 by a vote of 5–2, with Bettman and Daly in attendance. The council was advised that the NHL would not allow the team to leave Phoenix for at least seven years. A controversial section of the agreement, allowing Hulsizer to vacate the agreement if the city defaults or if a lawsuit invalidates any or part of the deal was amended to require Hulsizer to give Glendale 120 days to negotiate. The possibility of a lawsuit was raised by the Goldwater Institute, over concerns that the deal is an unconstitutional subsidy and the $97 million for management fees is "grossly disproportionate to the fair market value" and potentially violates a "gift clause" in state law. The deal with Hulsizer is more expensive for Glendale than proposed agreements with past owner Jerry Moyes and more expensive than proposed agreements with Jerry Reinsdorf and Ice Edge Holdings.

The NHL deadline of December 31, 2010 came and passed. Daly indicated in comments to the media that the NHL intends to complete the sale to Hulsizer, and has not started any relocation process. On January 20, 2011, the Arizona Republic reported in an editorial, that Glendale was modifying the lease agreement to appease concerns of the Goldwater Institute, which had threatened to oppose the sale in court. The Goldwater Institute has not decided whether to sue Glendale or not. On January 26, 2011, Bob McCown, a Canadian nationally syndicated radio talk show host, reported that Glendale's bond sale had failed and that the city was going to hire a securities firm to sell the securities. The report was denied by Daly as "totally false." In February 2011, the City listed bonds for sale for a total amount of $116 million. The Moody's Investor Service, upon review of the bond issue and Glendale, downgraded the city of Glendale's debt rating.

As of April 2011, the bonds still had not sold. This was attributed to the possible lawsuit of the Goldwater Institute. Media has reported that the NHL will attempt to arrange alternate financing to keep the team in Phoenix. According to Daly: "We believe Goldwater has become irrelevant to the process. We do not expect Goldwater to change its position. We will have to move on without them." The Arizona Republic reported that the NHL sent Glendale a bill of $25 million to cover the Coyotes' $36.6 million in losses for the 2010–11 season. The bill was forwarded under the agreement that Glendale would put aside $25 million to cover the season's losses while the search for a new owner would continue.

The media speculated that Hulsizer had abandoned his effort to purchase the Coyotes and pursue the St. Louis Blues, a claim denied by his investment group. The Ice Edge group, which had at one time sought to purchase the team, then became a minority investor with Hulsizer's syndicate, informed Hulsizer that it was no longer interested in investing in the purchase of the Coyotes.

The NHL's backup plan to sell the team to True North Sports and return it to Winnipeg if an agreement could not be reached was rendered moot in May 2011, when the group instead announced a deal to purchase the Atlanta Thrashers and move that team to Winnipeg.

On June 27, 2011, the Phoenix Business Journal reported that Hulsizer had ended his bid for the Coyotes. According to the report, his group of investors did not want to go through another several months of negotiating with Glendale. According to the reports, Jerry Reinsdorf had re-emerged as a potential buyer for the club.

== Goldwater Institute v. City of Glendale ==
In June 2009, the Goldwater Institute made a public records request to the City of Glendale for any documents pertaining to negotiations with potential new owners of the Coyotes. The city declined, and the Goldwater Institute filed a complaint with the Maricopa County Superior Court. In July 2009, the court ordered that Glendale must make all records of negotiations public. In August 2009, Goldwater filed a 'conditional objection' with the bankruptcy court over possible $15 to $23 million annual subsidies to Jerry Reinsdorf to inform the court that a potential sale to Reinsdorf under those terms would violate Arizona state law. Glendale released some documents to Goldwater, but not all, and Goldwater applied to the court in January 2010 to find Glendale in contempt of court. In response, Glendale filed a request for a protective order with the court and offered Goldwater access to view documents in camera.

When the proposed sale to Hulsizer and its lease agreement became public, Glendale filed studies to justify the purchase of parking rights at the Arena property and shared those with Goldwater. Goldwater wrote a letter to Glendale informing it that the proposed lease agreement appeared to violate Arizona's gift clause. In February 2011, the Goldwater Institute, in a public statement, called for Glendale to reconsider the proposed sale of bonds to finance the Hulsizer purchase, stating "the financial risk appears enormous and the transaction appears to violate the Arizona Constitution." The Institute had also found that one of the firms which had conducted the parking revenues analysis was being sued for "intentionally and fraudulently inflated event and attendance projections to inflate projected revenue and achieve an investment-grade rating" after a similar parking study in another city's issuance of bonds.

After the bonds were listed for sale with bond rating agencies, the Goldwater Institute wrote letters to those agencies, formally advising them of their belief that the bond sale violates Arizona state law, and that the Institute may file a lawsuit. The bonds did not sell immediately and on March 3, 2011, Glendale held a press conference on the lack of progress on the bond sale and to make a plea for public support. Mayor Scruggs asserted that "the Goldwater Institute is obstructing the city's ability to sell the necessary bonds". Media reports circulated that the City of Glendale was preparing to file a lawsuit against the Goldwater Institute alleging tortious interference with the bond sale and seeking up to $500 million in damages should the team leave Glendale. Goldwater president Darcy A. Olsen replied that any such action "would be frivolous and unsuccessful". Glendale Deputy City Manager for Communications Julie Frisoni confirmed only that a lawsuit was an option, but that it intended to work with Goldwater, and had contacted Goldwater board members, stating "the situation as it exists cannot continue without a resolution."

On March 8, Bettman and Daly traveled to Glendale to meet with city officials privately. The NHL attempted to arrange a private meeting with Goldwater, but Goldwater insisted on a public meeting. Bettman held a press conference, making it clear that the NHL was still committed to the sale, but that "I will not say today when the end is and I will not set a deadline, but at some point, we may have no choice but to begin pursuing our other alternatives." On March 15, 2011, the Goldwater Institute announced it would file a legal challenge against Glendale, on the grounds that the deal between Glendale and Hulsizer would violate the Arizona Constitution. On March 18, 2011, Daly took part in a Phoenix radio talk show to discuss the situation. He noted that Goldwater had been "effective" in stopping sales of the bonds, but that the NHL was working to find bond buyers "who are interested regardless of whatever litigation risk there might be from Goldwater."

On March 20, Hulsizer announced in an interview that he would agree to guarantee any short-fall in parking revenues up to $75 million. To ESPN, Hulsizer wrote that he had transmitted that to the Goldwater Institute in a letter. "The situation was stuck and we need to move forward. While we still believe the original deal is legal we wanted to make things simple." According to ESPN, the concession followed discussions among Arizona senator John McCain, former Arizona state attorney general Grant Woods, and officials with Goldwater. The following day, the Goldwater's Olsen announced that the Hulsizer guarantee did not change the Institute's view that the deal was still illegal under Arizona law. In an interview on radio, Olsen explained the Goldwater position. Hulsizer did not guarantee the bonds up to $75 million, but intended to back parking revenues up to $75 million over the 30-year lease. At $2.5 million per year, Olsen estimated that would be the parking revenues at the arena from concerts alone. The taxpayers of Glendale were not being offered any guarantee on the bonds. Glendale met in a public forum with Goldwater to attempt to end the impasse, but both sides did not change their positions on the possible deal.

== 2011–13: Failed sales to Jamison and Reinsdorf groups ==
After paying the $25 million for the 2010–11 season to the NHL, an agreement was reached between the NHL and Glendale for Glendale to pay another $25 million to keep the Coyotes in Glendale for the 2011–12 season. It was announced on May 6, 2011, two years after Jerry Moyes put the Coyotes into bankruptcy. Glendale Council in a vote of 5–2, approved the setting aside of another $25 million at a council meeting on May 10, 2011. Bill Daly spoke to the Council to state that the NHL remains committed to keeping the team in Arizona, whether it is with Hulsizer or another owner. Although the $25 million is technically an arena management fee, as the amount exceeds the NHL's costs of operating Jobing.com Arena the payment is a subsidy for the team's losses.

In June 2011, the Westgate City Center development adjacent to the Jobing.com Arena received notices of foreclosure. Part of the reason given for the foreclosure was the uncertainty around the Coyotes. The Center remained open, and occupancy rates continued to decline. The Steve Ellman companies attempted to reschedule debt on Westgate City Center and surrounding properties to prevent the Center from being sold to settle debt to lenders. Ellman acquired Westgate in 2006 by swapping his ownership in the Coyotes for Jerry Moyes' ownership share of Westgate. Ellman had moved the Coyotes to Glendale in 2005 after failing to get an arena built at the former Los Arcos Mall in Scottsdale. Two auctions were conducted for foreclosed Westgate City Center properties. One auction, on September 19, 2011, was for properties securing a $97.5 million loan from iStar Financial. The auction failed to sell at a reserve price of $40 million, and the 33 acres (13 ha) property became the property of iStar. A second auction was held on November 3, 2011 for properties securing a $202 million loan from Credit Suisse. No-one bid the $25 million minimum bid in the auction and Credit Suisse retained ownership of the properties.

After Hulsizer dropped out, the Phoenix Business Journal reported that Glendale and the NHL were negotiating with Reinsdorf and an unnamed group.

In August 2011, the Phoenix Business Journal reported that former San Jose Sharks CEO Greg Jamison was leading a group to purchase the Coyotes and keep the team in Arizona. The group arranged for exclusive negotiating rights. Jamison was president and CEO of the Sharks and its parent company, Silicon Valley Sports and Entertainment, from 1996 until September 2010.

On September 22, the Arizona Republic reported that Glendale Hockey LLC, a group which include Jerry Reinsdorf, Arizona lawyer John Kaites and Tony Tavares, had entered into negotiations to purchase the Coyotes. David Leibowitz, the group's spokesman, confirmed that Kaites is the managing partner of the group. It represented the second time that Kaites and Reinsdorf had entered into talks to purchase the team. The Jamison group continued its interest in purchasing the Coyotes. In December 2011, Glendale mayor Elaine Scruggs publicly stated that the Jamison group was still working on the proposal, and that Glendale was waiting for Jamison and the NHL to conclude an agreement and present it to Glendale.

In December 2011, after no sale announcement had been made, the media openly speculated that the Coyotes could be relocated to Quebec City if the team fails to find a new owner to keep the team in Glendale in time for the 2012–13 season. A new arena is planned to open in 2015 in Quebec. The club would play in the Colisée Pepsi arena until the new arena is completed. After the realignment for the 2011–12 season was announced (which was rejected), commissioner Bettman noted that the new configuration of the league could accommodate relocations if any took place.

During annual discussions with the media at the 2012 All-Star Game in Ottawa, Bettman revealed that a third group was interested in purchasing the Coyotes. Neither Bettman or anyone with the City of Glendale would reveal the identity of the group. Two weeks later, on February 9, 2012, former Phoenix player Jeremy Roenick was revealed to have joined the Jamison group. According to Roenick, the group was interested in purchasing the team along with the Westgate Center.

On April 3, 2012, Elaine Scruggs, the mayor of Glendale, stated she would no longer approve of any further subsidy to keep the Coyotes in Phoenix and she who also seek the return of the $20 million paid to the NHL in the previous season, which is being held in escrow by the league. However, on April 24, the city of Glendale approved another $25 million for the 2012–13 season.

During the 2012 playoffs, ESPN and the Phoenix Business Journal both reported a tentative deal had been reached between the NHL and the Jamison group. According to The Globe and Mail, the Jamison group sought a continuation of the "facility management fee" paid by the City of Glendale at a rate of $16 million annually to operate the Arena over a 30-year lease. The Goldwater Institute released a press release on May 7, stating "We are looking forward to reviewing the details of the deal when they are made public. We hope the new deal complies with the law and protects taxpayers by requiring the private parties involved to bear any related costs." Before the fifth game of the second round of the playoffs, Bettman held a press conference at the Jobing.com Arena to announce a tentative agreement between Jamison and the NHL, subject to a lease agreement with Glendale.

According to the Wall Street Journal, the deal proposed continuing the facility management fee paid by Glendale, at an average rate of $14.5 million per year. The City of Glendale would've also continued to pay the debt service charge of $12.6 million per year for Jobing.com Arena. The City's costs of $27.1 million were to be offset by anticipated Coyotes-related revenue of $14.2 million, according to projections from Glendale's city management department, leaving an annual deficit of $12.9 million to keep the team. The total cost to Glendale after the thirty-year term of the ownership deal would have been $271 million.

On June 8, Glendale City Council met to vote on the lease agreement with the Jamison group. The Goldwater Institute had attempted to have the vote postponed on the basis that the City of Glendale had not provided required documents to the Institute and the general public, but the trial judge refused to block the vote. The judge ordered Glendale to make its documents public. Council approved the lease agreement 4–2. During the meeting, Glendale City Council asked Jamison to name his investors, but Jamison declined. Gary Bettman also attended the meeting and noted that the NHL had extended its deadline of finalizing an agreement from May 27 to June 27.

On June 13, 2012, the Goldwater Institute filed two legal challenges to Glendale's vote to approve the lease. Goldwater's first filing wanted to nullify the vote on two points: one, that emergency approvals require five out of seven council members to pass; and two, that any deal by Glendale over $50,000 requires a request for proposal or invitation to local businesses to bid, suggesting that Glendale could find an arena manager at lower cost. Goldwater's second filing was for contempt of court for Glendale's not releasing documents outlining arena management performance standards and how the arena budget should be submitted, and documents pertaining to a non-relocation agreement with Jamison. Maricopa County Superior Court Judge Dean Fink ruled on Goldwater's legal challenges separately. Fink ruled that an 'emergency clause' in the agreement barring voters from referring the agreement was unconstitutional. Otherwise, Fink ruled that the agreement did not violate City of Glendale competitive bidding rules.

Immediately following the ruling, a petition drive was started. If 1,800 signatures supporting a referendum vote on the deal were collected, the agreement would be voted on as part of November municipal elections. The votes had to be collected by July 16, 2012. Several council candidates who opposed the deal called for a delay in signing the lease by City Manager Horatio Skeete. As well as putting the lease agreement up for referendum, Glendale citizens may put a 2.9% tax increase by Glendale on the ballot as well. Opponents only delivered a total of 1,568 signatures against the deal and delivered the petitions on July 12. The City of Glendale rejected the petitions on July 16.

During the summer and fall of 2012, the lease agreement was revised between Glendale and Jamison. Instead of first season payments of $17 million to Jamison, this was reduced to $11 million and penalties added if Jamison does not bring in at least 30 non-hockey events per year. The revised lease agreement was approved by the outgoing Glendale Council 4–2 on November 27, 2012.

The 2012–2013 NHL season resumed on January 19, 2013, the fourth season without an owner for the Phoenix Coyotes. On January 22, 2013 the Glendale City Council met for the first time with four new members, and failed to consider or discuss a new arena management agreement during the first three council meetings. Glendale City Attorney Craig Tindall resigned during an executive session on February 26, 2013, while Glendale worked without a permanent city manager, while facing a difficult budget process for fiscal 2014. On January 31, 2013, Jamison released a statement saying he would be unable to complete the sale of the team under the conditions of the lease.

== Sale in 2013 to Renaissance ==
On May 25, 2013, the NHL approved the sale of the Coyotes to Renaissance Sports & Entertainment (RS&E), a group of Canadian investors headed by banker George Gosbee and Anthony LeBlanc, who had previously tried to purchase the team in 2009 as part of Ice Edge Holdings. The deal was contingent upon a lease agreement with the city of Glendale regarding the usage of Jobing.com Arena. The announced purchase price was $170 million, with $45 million provided by RS&E, $120 million lent by the Fortress Investment Group (to be repaid by the fee Glendale taxpayers are going to pay the team to run the arena), and an $85 million loan from the NHL.

By June, the ownership group had not yet been able to finalize a deal with the City of Glendale to play at Jobing.com Arena. Speculation began that the NHL would move the team to Seattle. Although the NHL refused to publicly set a deadline, the need for the NHL to finalize its 2013–14 schedule by earlier July, and Glendale's need to finalize its 2013–14 budget by July 1, established a tight time-frame to work-out a new deal to keep the Coyotes in the Jobing.com arena. Unless the NHL had chosen to put the team on hiatus, the tight schedule left only Quebec City and Seattle as possible options for relocation in time for the 2013–14 season; and indications were that Gary Bettman's preferred choice was Seattle.

With the NHL Board of Governors scheduled to meet on June 27, it was widely anticipated that unless Glendale city council announced that a deal to keep the team in Arizona has been struck, the NHL would relocate the franchise to Seattle with its home games to be played out of the 11,000 seat KeyArena at Seattle Center until a new arena was completed.

The Glendale city council was scheduled to meet on June 25, in advance of the scheduled June 27 NHL Board of Governors' meeting, and the NHL issued the warning that "No decision could be a decision", meaning that a new arena deal was required, otherwise the NHL would be forced to relocate the franchise. On June 25, Glendale's city council met and announced they would have a public vote to decide the issue on July 2.

On June 27, with no decision on a new deal with Glendale, the NHL Board of Governors approved the sale of the Coyotes franchise to RS&E and set a July 2 deadline for the City of Glendale to reach an arena deal with the RS&E group, or the team would be moved.

Leading into the deadline vote, the NHL announced that Seattle's KeyArena would be an acceptable home for the relocated team if the City of Glendale could not reach a new agreement to keep the NHL franchise at Jobing.com Arena, while KeyArena confirmed that it was "holding dates" for the upcoming 2013–14 NHL season. In the late evening of July 2, Glendale City Council voted 4–3 to approve the lease agreement to keep the Phoenix Coyotes in the Jobing.com arena. The 15-year agreement pays the RS&E group $15 million yearly in "management fees" of Jobing.com Arena. The league's Board of Governors formally approved the RS&E deal on August 5, ending the league's ownership in the club.

RS&E affiliated company IceArizona managed the Coyotes and Jobing.com Arena. The RS&E/IceArizona group was headquartered in Houston. The group was mainly composed of investors from the energy sector, including George Gosbee of Edmonton, Alberta. Two other investors, finance industry executives Anthony LeBlanc and Daryl Jones, had been involved in previous attempts to buy the team.

== NHL vs. Jerry Moyes and other disputes ==
The National Hockey League filed a lawsuit against Jerry Moyes seeking to recover its costs and damages. It was revealed that the NHL lost $112.7 million in operating the Coyotes. The NHL had sued Moyes over the funds, but Judge Baum ruled against the NHL. The NHL can still appeal the decision. The Judge allowed the NHL to sue Moyes for legal fees. The NHL stated that it would continue to sue Moyes over contractual obligations as Coyotes' owner. On January 20, 2015, David Shoalts of The Globe and Mail reported that Baum had recommended to the US Court presiding that the NHL not get the full $145 million it was seeking, but could seek some smaller amount in damages. NHL Deputy Commissioner Daly stated that the NHL would appeal all aspects of the ruling.

The NHL reached a settlement with Wayne Gretzky in December 2013 for a reported $8 million.

== See also ==
- Utah Mammoth, the final aftermath of the Coyotes franchise by 2024
