= Tony Reagins =

American baseball executive (born 1967)

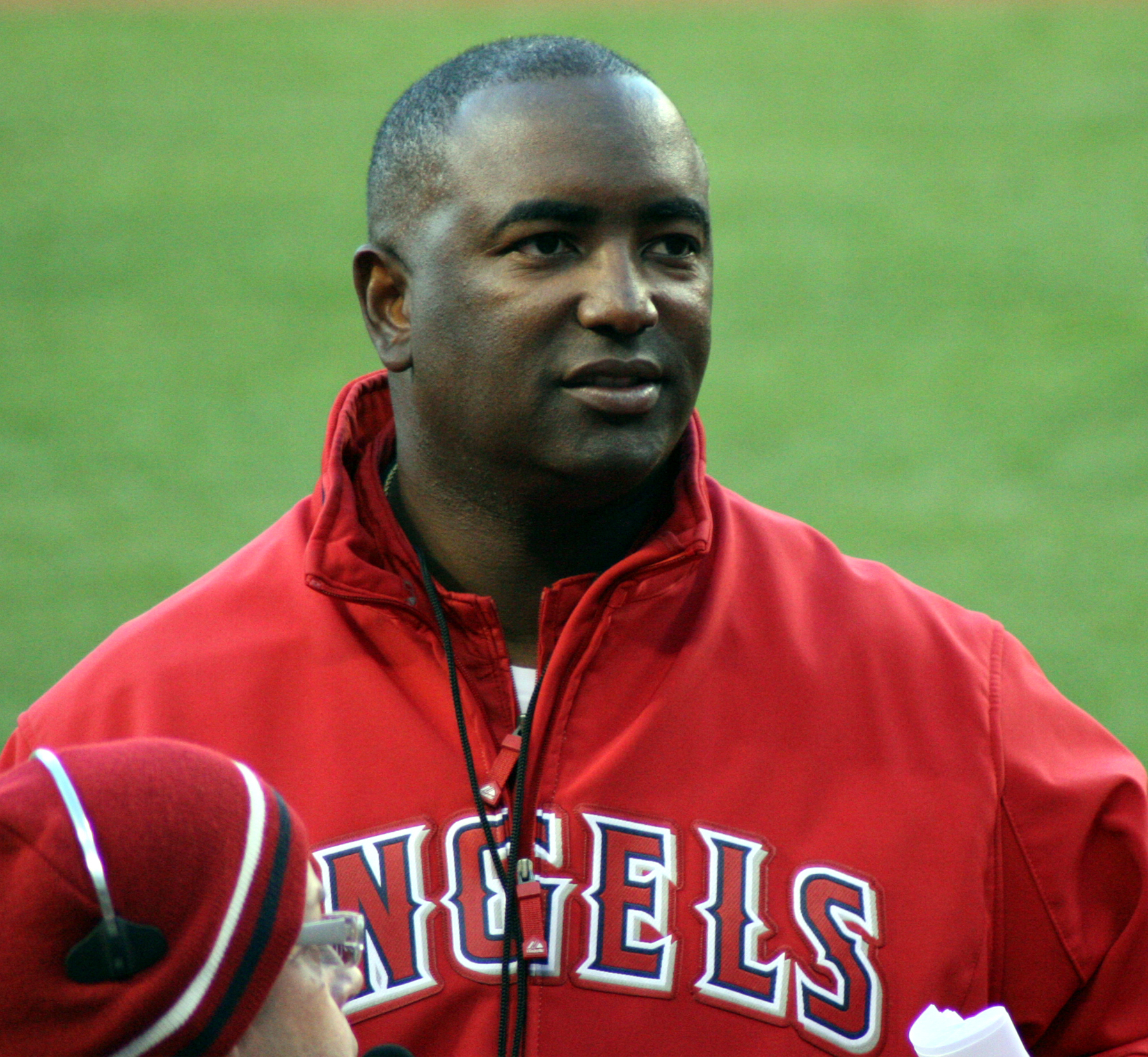
- Reagins in 2010
- Born: March 11, 1967 (age 59); Indio, California, U.S.
- Education: California State University, Fullerton
- Occupation: Major League Baseball executive
- Years active: 1992–2011
- Organization: Los Angeles Angels of Anaheim

Tony Demetrius Reagins (born March 11, 1967) is an American former executive in Major League Baseball for the Los Angeles Angels of Anaheim. Reagins served as the general manager of the Angels from 2007 until his 2011 resignation. The fourth African American general manager in MLB history, (Note: Reagins was preceded in this distinction by Bill Lucas of the Atlanta Braves, Bob Watson of the Houston Astros and New York Yankees, and Kenny Williams of the Chicago White Sox.) he was promoted to GM of the franchise on October 16, 2007, having previously held the position of director of player development since 2002.

== Education ==
Reagins pledged to the Theta Upsilon chapter of Phi Beta Sigma fraternity in 1988, while attending California State University, Fullerton. In 1991, he graduated with a bachelor's degree in marketing from CSUF. He had previously received an associate degree in business administration from the College of the Desert.

== Career ==
Reagins joined the Angels as an intern in the club's marketing department in 1991, and moved permanently to the team's baseball staff in 1998 as manager of baseball operations. He is a member of the Buck O'Neil Scout Association and an active supporter of Major League Baseball's Urban Youth Academy.

Reagins began his career as an intern in baseball operations in the Angels' organization 1992. He then held an internship in marketing/advertising sales in 1993 before being named marketing assistant in 1994. He moved to sponsorship services representative from 1996 until returning to baseball operations in April 1998. He served six seasons as the Angels' Director of Player Development, a position he held until becoming general manager of the Angels. As director of player development, Reagins was responsible for overseeing the Angel farm system, with seven affiliates that include a Dominican Summer League club and developmental academy in San Pedro de Macoris, Dominican Republic. The Angels' farm system posted winning records in four of the six seasons (2003-05-06-07) and was named "Minor League Organization of the Year" in 2003 by The Sporting News. It produced players such as Howie Kendrick, Reggie Willits, Robb Quinlan, Kendry Morales, Erick Aybar, Jeff Mathis, Mike Napoli, Jered Weaver and Joe Saunders – all of whom made significant impacts on the 2007 American League West Division champion team. Minor League News named the Angels "2007 Farm System of the Year." Currently, Reagins maintains his competitive spirit by coaching his son's youth basketball team in Mamaroneck, New York.

=== Tenure as general manager ===
As general manager of the Angels, Reagins was quick to make immediate changes to the Angels' roster. A little more than a month after taking over for Bill Stoneman as GM, Reagins traded Gold Glove shortstop Orlando Cabrera to the Chicago White Sox for starting pitcher Jon Garland. Two days later, Reagins signed free agent outfielder Torii Hunter to a 5-year, $90 million contract. At the 2008 trade deadline, Reagins dealt first baseman Casey Kotchman to the Atlanta Braves for Mark Teixeira. Reagins' tenure with the Angels has been in contrast to that of Stoneman, whose time as general manager involved relatively few major trades or other transactions.

During the 2009 season, Reagins and his front office selected Mike Trout with the 25th pick in that year's draft. After the 2009 season, in which the Angels were the AL West Division Champions, the Angels gave Reagins a contract extension. Although no details of the contract length was divulged, Reagins described it as 'long-term', adding "there's a comfort level from [owner] Arte Moreno and myself as far as the length of the contract goes. . . . I am honored and I appreciate deeply the confidence that Arte has shown in not only myself, but the job that we're doing as an organization."

==== Conflict with Moreno and resignation ====
Before the 2011 season, Angels' owner Arte Moreno insisted on acquiring Vernon Wells from the Toronto Blue Jays, and reportedly told Reagins that he would be fired if he did not acquire Wells within 24 hours. On September 30, 2011, Reagins resigned as GM. While many point to the Angels not making the playoffs in consecutive years since 2000–01 as the reason, others identified his trade of Mike Napoli and Juan Rivera for Wells being a significant factor. Many widely respected baseball analysts considered the Wells trade one of the worst trades in the modern era of Major League Baseball.

Reagins remained with the organization as special assistant to team chairman Dennis Kuhl.

== Notes ==
Sporting positions
Preceded by Bill Stoneman	Los Angeles Angels General Manager; 2007–2011	Succeeded by Jerry Dipoto
