= Jerry Dipoto =

American baseball player and executive (born 1968)

Seattle Mariners
- Pitcher / President of Baseball Operations
- Born: May 24, 1968 (age 58); Jersey City, New Jersey, U.S.
- Batted: Right Threw: Right

MLB debut
- May 11, 1993, for the Cleveland Indians

Last MLB appearance
- October 1, 2000, for the Colorado Rockies

MLB statistics
- Win–loss record: 27–24
- Earned run average: 4.05
- Strikeouts: 352
- Saves: 49
- Stats at Baseball Reference

Teams
- As player: Cleveland Indians (1993–1994); New York Mets (1995–1996); Colorado Rockies (1997–2000); As general manager: Arizona Diamondbacks (2010); Los Angeles Angels of Anaheim (2011–2015); Seattle Mariners (2015–2022); As executive: Seattle Mariners (2023–present)

Gerard Dipoto (born May 24, 1968) is an American baseball executive and former professional player. He is currently the president of baseball operations for the Seattle Mariners of Major League Baseball (MLB). He previously was the general manager of the Los Angeles Angels of Anaheim and worked in front office positions for the Arizona Diamondbacks, Colorado Rockies, and Boston Red Sox.

Dipoto was a relief pitcher in MLB for the Cleveland Indians, New York Mets, and Rockies from 1993 through 2000, after pitching in college for the VCU Rams.

== Early life ==
Dipoto played high school baseball at Toms River High School North in Toms River, New Jersey. He enrolled at Virginia Commonwealth University (VCU) and played college baseball for the VCU Rams. He led the Rams to their first-ever appearance in the NCAA Tournament in 1988. He was primarily a starting pitcher in college, with a 10–9 win–loss record and 8 saves in his final two seasons.

== Professional career ==
The Cleveland Indians selected Dipoto in the third round of the 1989 Major League Baseball draft. Originally a starting pitcher, he converted to a relief role in 1992 with the Triple-A Colorado Springs Sky Sox. He made his major league debut in 1993. He saved 11 games that season, receiving one third-place vote for the AL Rookie of the Year Award.

After the 1994 season, the Indians traded Dipoto with Paul Byrd, Dave Mlicki, and a player to be named later (later identified as minor leaguer Jesus Azuaje) to the New York Mets for Jeromy Burnitz and Joe Roa.

After the 1996 season, Dipoto was traded by the Mets to the Colorado Rockies for pitcher Armando Reynoso. He was the team's closer in 1997 and 1998, earning 35 saves in his first two seasons with the Rockies.

== Front office career ==
After retiring due to ongoing neck injuries in March 2001, Dipoto worked in the Colorado Rockies' front office as a special assistant to general manager Dan O'Dowd. In 2003, he became a scout for the Boston Red Sox and was part of the organization when they won the 2004 World Series. In 2005, he returned to the Rockies as the head of professional scouting. When Josh Byrnes, whom Dipoto had known since his days as a Rockies player, became the general manager of the Arizona Diamondbacks, Dipoto went with Byrnes to Arizona and became the director of scouting and player personnel.

Byrnes was fired on July 1, 2010, and Dipoto was named interim general manager. On September 22, Kevin Towers was named the new Diamondbacks' general manager. Dipoto was offered the opportunity to remain with the Diamondbacks.

On October 28, 2011, the Los Angeles Angels of Anaheim announced Dipoto would be their next general manager, replacing Tony Reagins. Angels' owner Arte Moreno said that "one of the reasons we hired Jerry is that I really liked the way he viewed baseball analytics." However, Dipoto and manager Mike Scioscia disagreed over the use of analytics in baseball decisions, and a rift developed between the two when Dipoto fired hitting coach Mickey Hatcher. Despite rumors that the Angels might replace either Dipoto or Scioscia after the 2013 season, Moreno announced that both would return to the Angels for the 2014 season.

Tension between Dipoto and Scioscia continued during the 2015 season over the way Scioscia and his coaches delivered statistical reports developed by Dipoto and the front office to their players. Dipoto resigned from his position on July 1, 2015.

On August 12, 2015, the Boston Red Sox hired Dipoto in an advisory role. When the Seattle Mariners fired Jack Zduriencik after seven years with the club, they launched a GM search which lasted exactly one month, culminating with the hiring of Dipoto on September 28.

Dipoto started a podcast with Mariners' broadcaster Aaron Goldsmith called The Wheelhouse in 2017.

On September 1, 2021, the Mariners promoted Dipoto to president of baseball operations (POBO) and signed him to a multi-year contract extension. He is the longest serving head of baseball operations (general manager or POBO) in franchise history.

== Personal life ==
Dipoto and his wife have three children. Their son, Jonah, also pitched professionally, reaching Triple-A in 2024.

Dipoto is a thyroid cancer survivor. He underwent curative thyroid surgery in 1994.

Sporting positions
Preceded by Josh Byrnes	Arizona Diamondbacks General Manager; 2010; July 1 – September 22	Succeeded by Kevin Towers
Preceded by Tony Reagins	Los Angeles Angels General Manager; 2011–2015	Succeeded by Billy Eppler
Preceded by Jack Zduriencik	Seattle Mariners General Manager; 2015–2021	Succeeded by Justin Hollander
