= Tony Tavares =

American accountant and sports executive

Tony Tavares is an American accountant and sports executive. He has served as the team president for the Mighty Ducks of Anaheim and Dallas Stars of the National Hockey League, and for the Anaheim Angels and Montreal Expos / Washington Nationals of Major League Baseball.

== Career ==
Tavares received a Bachelor of Science degree in accounting from Roger Williams University. He became involved in arena management when he was hired as controller of the Providence Civic Center. He served as president of the Spectacor Management Group.

In 1993, Tavares became the team president of the Mighty Ducks of Anaheim, an expansion team in the National Hockey League (NHL). He negotiated The Walt Disney Company's purchase of the Anaheim Angels of Major League Baseball, and became the head of Disney Sports Enterprises, running the Ducks and the Angels simultaneously. When MLB took control of the Montreal Expos, Tavares was hired as team president to facilitate the sale of the franchise to new ownership. He remained with the franchise as they relocated to Washington, D.C., becoming the Washington Nationals. He stayed on as president until the team was sold to Ted Lerner in 2006.

Tavares became the president and chief executive officer of the Sports Properties Acquisition Corporation. In 2011, Tavares was named the interim president of the Dallas Stars of the NHL, when they were in the process of being sold. Later that year, he joined with Jerry Reinsdorf to form a group that explored purchasing the Phoenix Coyotes of the NHL during their bankruptcy. In 2015, the city of Glendale, Arizona, hired Tavares to perform an audit on the finances of the Coyotes.

== Personal life ==
Tavares and his wife, Elizabeth, have three children.
