= Arte Moreno =

American businessman (born 1946)

Arturo Moreno
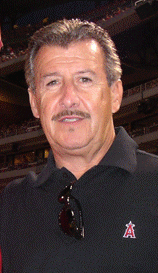
- Moreno in 2007
- Born: August 14, 1946 (age 80); Tucson, Arizona, U.S.
- Education: University of Arizona (BS)
- Known for: CEO of Outdoor Systems; owner of the Los Angeles Angels
- Parent(s): Mary and Arturo Ricardo Moreno

Arturo "Arte" Moreno (born August 14, 1946) is an American businessman. On May 15, 2003, he became the first Mexican-American to own a major sports team in the United States when he purchased the Anaheim Angels baseball team from the Walt Disney Company.

In August 2022, he announced that he would explore a possible sale of the franchise, but in January 2023, he decided not to sell the team. In 2026, Moreno announced that he has agreed to sell the team to sports team owner Stan Kroenke.

== Early life and education ==
Moreno was born into a Mexican American family and raised in Tucson, Arizona, the oldest of 11 children of Maria and Arturo Moreno, who immigrated from Mexico. His father ran a small print shop; his grandfather owned El Tucsonense, Tucson's first Spanish-language newspaper. In 1965, Moreno graduated from high school and in 1966, he was drafted into the United States Army and served in the Vietnam War. After returning to civilian life in 1968, he enrolled at the University of Arizona where he graduated in 1973 with a degree in marketing.

== Career ==
=== Advertising background ===
After school, he was hired to work at Eller Outdoor, an advertising company. He traveled across the country for the next seven years, relocating several times and in 1984, he moved back to Arizona, settling in Phoenix, where he was hired by billboard company Outdoor Systems. In 1984, Moreno and his friend Wally Kelly attempted unsuccessfully to buy the firm from owner William S. Levine. Moreno and Kelly entered into a partnership with Levine, and Moreno later became its president and chief executive officer.

In 1996, Moreno took Outdoor Systems public. The company's stock soared, and in 1998 Outdoor Systems was purchased by Infinity Broadcasting for $8 billion.

=== Baseball ownership ===
With baseball being Moreno's favorite pastime, he purchased the Salt Lake Trappers minor league team alongside 17 other investors in 1986. The group owned the team until 1992, and the venture proved to be a resounding financial success.

By 2001, Moreno wished to own a Major League Baseball (MLB) team. He attempted to buy controlling interest in his home state's Arizona Diamondbacks, but no deal could be reached. He nonetheless remained determined to own a Major League team, and soon set his sights on the 2002 World Series champion Anaheim Angels.

It was announced in April 2003 that Moreno had agreed with The Walt Disney Company to purchase the team for $180 million. On May 15, 2003, MLB commissioner Bud Selig announced that the sale of the Angels to Moreno had been approved. One of the first people to congratulate Moreno after the news was Diamondbacks' owner Jerry Colangelo, a personal friend who declared it a good opportunity for Moreno.

==== Angels owner ====
Moreno soon demonstrated a willingness to spend the money necessary to sign premium players, including star outfielder Vladimir Guerrero. He also took a hands-on approach, becoming a regular attendee of the team's home games and periodically leaving his owner's box during games to mingle with fans in the regular stadium seating areas and concourses. All of these moves proved very popular with fans. In the first year of his ownership, the Angels drew more than three million fans, 750,000 more than their championship season.

However, Moreno encountered a substantial backlash from some fans of the team, and in particular, from the city leadership of Anaheim, California, over his decision in 2005 to change the name of the team from the Anaheim Angels to the Los Angeles Angels of Anaheim. Moreno saw the change as part of an overall strategy to increase the team's revenue by actively marketing it to, and associating it with, the entire Los Angeles metropolitan area, rather than restricting the team's identity to the city of Anaheim and to Orange County. In recent years, the San Diego Zoo and Los Angeles Times have been notable club sponsors, while all baseball TV rightsholders also use some variation of the team's new name, indicating the effect of Moreno's plan. But the move outraged Anaheim city officials, who responded by suing the team. It also angered a substantial segment of the Angels' fan base in Orange County, who took pride in the team's identity being distinct from Los Angeles. The awkwardness of the of Anaheim suffix, appended to satisfy a contractual requirement for Anaheim to be included in the team's name, also caused the new name to become the subject of national ridicule. Eventually, the team won the lawsuit filed by the city.

Aside from the name controversy, Moreno's first few seasons as owner of the Angels were largely successful. The team posted three consecutive winning seasons for the first time in club history (2007–2009), including winning the American League Western Division championship in 2004, 2005, 2007, 2008, 2009, and 2014 when they finished with a league leading 98 regular season wins. However, the Angels, even with Albert Pujols and Mike Trout at the helm for the team, could not lead them back to the postseason or win a postseason game. From 2010 to 2022, the Angels failed to win a postseason game (the longest gap since their drought from 1987 to 2001) despite a massive deal for Trout for over $400 million and high priced signings of players such as Pujols, Anthony Rendon, Josh Hamilton, that totaled over $500 million. A losing season in 2022 tied a franchise record of seventh straight losing seasons, matching the mark set from 1971 to 1977.

Just prior to the start of the 2006 Major League season, Moreno scored another success in signing a lucrative contract with Fox Sports Net for the television broadcast rights for the Angels' regular season games. The ten-year deal significantly increased the team's television revenue. In April 2006, Forbes magazine estimated the team to be worth $368 million—twice the amount Moreno paid for the club only three years earlier; in January 2018 Forbes estimated the franchise value at $1.75 billion.

[Moreno] has really done an amazing job with the franchise. To double the value in three years without getting a new stadium is an incredible feat.

— Forbes magazine associate editor Kurt Badenhausen

In October 2020, Moreno, through his company SRB Management, agreed to purchase Angel Stadium and the surrounding parking lots from the City of Anaheim for $320 million. In May 2022, it was reported that the FBI had conducted a corruption investigation into the dealings of the city and the stadium sale, which led to the resignation of Anaheim mayor Harry Sidhu on May 24. In light of the scandal, the Anaheim City Council voted to cancel the sale later that day.

On August 23, 2022, Moreno officially announced that he would explore a possible sale of the Angels franchise. In a public statement, Moreno said that he and his family decided "now is the time" after a "a great deal of thoughtful consideration". The franchise was estimated to be worth $2.2 billion by Forbes in an analysis from March 2022. However, he retracted that statement and committed himself to owning the team, citing "unfinished business".

In his tenure, the Angels had a run of sustained consistency in the mid to late 2000s that included five American League West championships from 2004 to 2009. After failing to reach the World Series each time, they missed the postseason until 2014, two years after having signed Albert Pujols to a record 10-year deal for $254 million that outbid the St. Louis Cardinals. The Pujols deal is now considered one of the worst deals in free agent history as the career .300 hitter of the time proceeded to hit under .300 in each season before being released in 2021. The Angels won 98 games in 2014 but were swept in the first round by the Kansas City Royals. The next year saw them win 85 games but it also started a spiral for the team. From 2016 to 2025, the Angels have had a losing season and failed to reach the postseason each time, despite the fact that in four of those ten seasons they had an MVP on the roster (Trout won in 2016 and 2019 and Shohei Ohtani, acquired in 2018, won it in 2021 and 2023). The ten losing seasons, all under Moreno's leadership as owner, is the worst stretch in Angels history, eclipsing the 1971–1977 era.

He has been criticized for targeting mega-contracts that quickly became problematic – particularly those of Vernon Wells, Albert Pujols, Josh Hamilton and Anthony Rendon, the latter three of which came with the loss of draft picks – and then declining to exceed the luxury tax threshold in an effort to make up for it. He has been criticized for not paying enough attention to the infrastructure that helps organizations develop talent through minor league systems, part of the reason the Angels' farm system has ranked within the bottom eight in the industry by Baseball America seven out of the past 10 years. And he has been criticized for continually cutting costs in many of the behind-the-scenes aspects that would help maximize expensive rosters, from analytics to training resources to staffing hires – an approach one former pitcher described as "buying a McLaren and taking it to Jiffy Lube".

— ESPN writer Alden González

In the 2023 offseason, the Angels lost two-time AL MVP Shohei Ohtani to free agency after they failed to offer a better deal than the Los Angeles Dodgers. Following the Dodgers victories in the 2024 and 2025 World Series, criticism of Moreno increased from Angels fans who felt the team could have made a playoff run by building around Trout and Ohtani. In 2026, Moreno drew criticism from the Major League Baseball Players Association after he said that the "number one thing fans want is affordability" while also saying "They want safety, and they want a good experience when they come to the ballpark. Believe it or not, winning is not in their top five."

Moreno has earned a reputation of being one of the worst owners in Major League Baseball (MLB) history due to his reluctance to spend on free agents and player development programs, failing to build a winning team around superstar Mike Trout. As of 2026, the Angels hold the longest active postseason drought of any MLB team, having not made the postseason or posted a winning record since the 2014 season.

On September 1, 2026, Stan Kroenke, owner of the Los Angeles Rams, announced his intention to buy the Angels from the Moreno family. According to a joint statement released by Kroenke and Arte Moreno, the franchise sale process was expected to conclude in early 2027, although an exact sale price has yet to be revealed.

==== Other business interests ====
On February 26, 2006, Moreno led a partnership of buyers to purchase Radio 830 KMXE, the nation's largest Spanish-language AM radio station. For the 2006 and 2007 seasons Radio 830 KMXE served as the Spanish-language radio broadcast outlet for the Angels. On July 17, 2007, the station began broadcasting from new studios located in Angel Stadium. Just before the 2008 season the station became AM830 KLAA (AM) and went all English language, including the Angels game broadcasts. The station has since added morning and afternoon sports talk shows to its lineup.

While it seems a new trend for sports teams to buy their own radio stations (see the St. Louis Cardinals and the Washington Commanders), for the Angels it is a tradition started by team founder Gene Autry, who owned 710 KMPC and broadcast the games for years.

== Personal life ==
Moreno has been married twice. He has three children.

In 1997, Moreno and his wife established the Moreno Family Foundation, which supports non-profit organizations focusing on youth and education. It also has provided support to the athletic programs at the University of Arizona.

Aside from this, Moreno is vigilant about maintaining his privacy. He refuses most interview requests, and he does not discuss his personal life publicly. His family and friends also avoid commenting on his personal life publicly, though off the record, those who know him describe him as "unabashed in his support of Republican politics" and as particularly dedicated to his family.

In September 2020 he endorsed Donald Trump for president, saying "it’s very necessary to vote for President Trump".
