= 1994–95 Hartford Whalers season =

National Hockey League team season

1994–95 Hartford Whalers
- Division: 5th Northeast
- Conference: 10th Eastern
- 1994–95 record: 19–24–5
- Home record: 12–10–2
- Road record: 7–14–3
- Goals for: 127
- Goals against: 141

Team information
- General manager: Jim Rutherford
- Coach: Paul Holmgren
- Captain: Pat Verbeek (Oct.–Mar.); Vacant (Mar.–May)
- Alternate captains: Glen Wesley; Andrew Cassels; Adam Burt (Mar.–May)
- Arena: Hartford Civic Center
- Average attendance: 11,835 (75.7%)
- Minor league affiliates: Springfield Falcons (AHL); Richmond Renegades (ECHL)

Team leaders
- Goals: Geoff Sanderson (18)
- Assists: Andrew Cassels (30)
- Points: Andrew Cassels (37)
- Penalty minutes: Kelly Chase (141)
- Plus/minus: Brad McCrimmon (+7); Andrei Nikolishin (+7)
- Wins: Sean Burke (17)
- Goals against average: Sean Burke (2.68)

The 1994–95 Hartford Whalers season was the 23rd season of the franchise, 16th season in the NHL. Despite trading away star forward Pat Verbeek to the New York Rangers on March 23, 1995, the Whalers played solid over the next 16 games from March 25 to April 24, with a record of 8-7-1. However, the Whalers could not keep pace with the New York Rangers who went on to take 8th place in the Eastern Conference. It was the third consecutive season that the Whalers missed the playoffs. On a positive note, the Whalers had the most overtime wins and the best overtime record in the NHL, going 4-0-5. Darren Turcotte led all NHL skaters in overtime goals scored with 2.

== Off-season ==
The Whalers announced on May 19 that head coach Pierre McGuire would not return to the club. McGuire took over the head coaching duties early in the 1993–94, as Paul Holmgren focused on his role as general manager of the team. In 67 games, McGuire led the Whalers to a 23-37-7 record.

On June 28, the Whalers selected Steve Martins in the 1994 NHL supplemental draft. Martins played the 1993–94 season with Harvard University, where he 25 goals and 60 points in 32 games.

At the 1994 NHL entry draft held at the Hartford Civic Center on June 28, the Whalers selected Jeff O'Neill from the Guelph Storm of the Ontario Hockey League with their first round, fifth overall selection. O'Neill scored 45 goals and 126 points in 66 games with the Storm during the 1993–94 season. The only other player that the Whalers selected in the draft that played in the NHL was Hnat Domenichelli, who Hartford selected in the fourth round.

On June 28, the NHL announced that the Whalers ownership transferred to the Compuware group, led by Peter Karmanos Jr., Thomas Thewes and Jim Rutherford. The group owned the Detroit Junior Red Wings of the Ontario Hockey League, originally named the Detroit Compuware Ambassadors, since they were awarded an OHL expansion franchise on December 11, 1989. Rutherford took over the general manager duties of the Whalers at this time, replacing Paul Holmgren, who returned to head coaching duties. Rutherford was a former NHL goaltender, amassing a 151-227-59 record with a 3.66 GAA in 457 games with the Detroit Red Wings, Pittsburgh Penguins, Toronto Maple Leafs and Los Angeles Kings in a career that spanned from 1970 to 1983. Following his playing career, Rutherford was the general manager of the Windsor Compuware Spitfires from 1985 to 1989. He then became the general manager of the Detroit Compuware Ambassadors/Detroit Junior Red Wings franchise from 1989 to 1994.

The Whalers signed free agent Jimmy Carson on July 13. Carson split the 1993–94 season between the Los Angeles Kings and Vancouver Canucks, as he scored 14 goals and 28 points in 59 games. Carson's best NHL season was in 1987–88 with the Kings, when he scored 55 goals and 107 points in 80 games. On August 9, 1988, Carson was traded to the Edmonton Oilers in a blockbuster trade in which Wayne Gretzky was traded to Los Angeles.

On August 18, the Whalers signed restricted free agent Steven Rice from the Edmonton Oilers. In 63 games, Rice scored 17 goals and 32 points during the 1993–94 season. As compensation for signing Rice, Hartford sent Bryan Marchment to the Oilers on August 30.

The Whalers acquired Glen Wesley from the Boston Bruins in a trade on August 26, sending their first round draft picks in the 1995 NHL entry draft, 1996 NHL entry draft and 1997 NHL entry draft to the Bruins. Wesley scored 14 goals and 58 points in 81 games during the 1993–94 season. He was drafted third overall by Boston in the 1987 NHL entry draft, and had accumulated 77 goals and 307 points in 537 games since beginning his career in the 1987–88 season.

Following the 1994–95 NHL lockout, which postponed the start of the season until January 1995, the Whalers participated in the waiver draft on January 18. Hartford selected Brian Glynn from the Vancouver Canucks and Kelly Chase from the St. Louis Blues. Glynn split the 1993–94 season with the Ottawa Senators and Canucks, scoring two goals and 15 points in 64 games. In 17 playoff games with Vancouver, Glynn had three assists. Chase played in 68 games with the Blues during 1993–94, scoring two goals and seven points, along with 278 penalty minutes.

== Regular season ==
The Whalers tied the Dallas Stars and the Toronto Maple Leafs for the lowest shooting percentage during the regular season, with just 127 goals on 1,428 shots (8.9%).

=== Final standings ===
Northeast Division
No.	CR		GP	W	L	T	GF	GA	Pts
1	1	**Quebec Nordiques**	48	30	13	5	185	134	65
2	3	**Pittsburgh Penguins**	48	29	16	3	181	158	61
3	4	**Boston Bruins**	48	27	18	3	150	127	57
4	7	**Buffalo Sabres**	48	22	19	7	130	119	51
5	10	Hartford Whalers	48	19	24	5	127	141	43
6	11	Montreal Canadiens	48	18	23	7	125	148	43
7	14	Ottawa Senators	48	9	34	5	117	174	23

Eastern Conference
R		Div	GP	W	L	T	GF	GA	Pts
**1**	**Quebec Nordiques**	**NE**	**48**	**30**	**13**	**5**	**185**	**134**	65
**2**	**Philadelphia Flyers**	**AT**	**48**	**28**	**16**	**4**	**150**	**132**	60
**3**	**Pittsburgh Penguins**	**NE**	**48**	**29**	**16**	**3**	**181**	**158**	61
**4**	**Boston Bruins**	**NE**	**48**	**27**	**18**	**3**	**150**	**127**	57
**5**	**New Jersey Devils**	**AT**	**48**	**22**	**18**	**8**	**136**	**121**	52
**6**	**Washington Capitals**	**AT**	**48**	**22**	**18**	**8**	**136**	**120**	52
**7**	**Buffalo Sabres**	**NE**	**48**	**22**	**19**	**7**	**130**	**119**	51
**8**	**New York Rangers**	**AT**	**48**	**22**	**23**	**3**	**139**	**134**	47
9	Florida Panthers	AT	48	20	22	6	115	127	46
10	Hartford Whalers	NE	48	19	24	5	127	141	43
11	Montreal Canadiens	NE	48	18	23	7	125	148	43
12	Tampa Bay Lightning	AT	48	17	28	3	120	144	37
13	New York Islanders	AT	48	15	28	5	126	158	35
14	Ottawa Senators	NE	48	9	34	5	117	174	23

Divisions: AT – Atlantic, NE – Northeast

bold – Qualified for playoffs

== Schedule and results ==
1994–95 regular season
January: 1–2–2 (home: 1–1–2; road: 0–1–0)

Game	Date	Score	Opponent	Record	Attendance	Recap
1	January 21, 1995	1–1 OT	Washington Capitals (1994–95)	0–0–1	15,635	T
2	January 22, 1995	2–2 OT	New Jersey Devils (1994–95)	0–0–2	12,054	T
3	January 25, 1995	4–1	Ottawa Senators (1994–95)	1–0–2	8,567	W
4	January 26, 1995	2–3	@ Philadelphia Flyers (1994–95)	1–1–2	16,557	L
5	January 28, 1995	1–2	Florida Panthers (1994–95)	1–2–2	9,419	L

February: 6–7–1 (home: 3–2–0; road: 3–5–1)

Game	Date	Score	Opponent	Record	Attendance	Recap
6	February 1, 1995	2–1	@ Ottawa Senators (1994–95)	2–2–2	9,663	W
7	February 4, 1995	4–5	@ Boston Bruins (1994–95)	2–3–2	14,448	L
8	February 5, 1995	1–3	@ Quebec Nordiques (1994–95)	2–4–2	13,207	L
9	February 8, 1995	2–3	Quebec Nordiques (1994–95)	2–5–2	8,032	L
10	February 10, 1995	3–4	@ Tampa Bay Lightning (1994–95)	2–6–2	16,639	L
11	February 11, 1995	3–4	@ Florida Panthers (1994–95)	2–7–2	14,311	L
12	February 13, 1995	2–2 OT	@ Montreal Canadiens (1994–95)	2–7–3	16,370	T
13	February 15, 1995	4–1	Montreal Canadiens (1994–95)	3–7–3	11,445	W
14	February 16, 1995	2–5	@ Pittsburgh Penguins (1994–95)	3–8–3	13,179	L
15	February 18, 1995	4–2	Pittsburgh Penguins (1994–95)	4–8–3	12,888	W
16	February 22, 1995	3–2 OT	Boston Bruins (1994–95)	5–8–3	14,021	W
17	February 24, 1995	2–1	@ New York Rangers (1994–95)	6–8–3	18,200	W
18	February 25, 1995	1–3	Buffalo Sabres (1994–95)	6–9–3	13,117	L
19	February 28, 1995	6–3	@ Ottawa Senators (1994–95)	7–9–3	9,174	W

March: 6–6–2 (home: 5–4–0; road: 1–2–2)

Game	Date	Score	Opponent	Record	Attendance	Recap
20	March 1, 1995	2–5	New York Rangers (1994–95)	7–10–3	15,011	L
21	March 4, 1995	3–2 OT	Tampa Bay Lightning (1994–95)	8–10–3	9,151	W
22	March 5, 1995	2–5	Boston Bruins (1994–95)	8–11–3	15,635	L
23	March 7, 1995	1–3	@ New York Islanders (1994–95)	8–12–3	10,371	L
24	March 9, 1995	2–1	Quebec Nordiques (1994–95)	9–12–3	8,886	W
25	March 12, 1995	1–4	Florida Panthers (1994–95)	9–13–3	9,741	L
26	March 14, 1995	6–4	New York Islanders (1994–95)	10–13–3	8,137	W
27	March 16, 1995	2–2 OT	@ New Jersey Devils (1994–95)	10–13–4	16,032	T
28	March 20, 1995	0–5	Washington Capitals (1994–95)	10–14–4	8,219	L
29	March 22, 1995	4–3	Philadelphia Flyers (1994–95)	11–14–4	10,149	W
30	March 25, 1995	5–1	New York Islanders (1994–95)	12–14–4	13,337	W
31	March 26, 1995	4–3 OT	@ Washington Capitals (1994–95)	13–14–4	11,739	W
32	March 29, 1995	4–4 OT	@ Florida Panthers (1994–95)	13–14–5	13,507	T
33	March 31, 1995	0–2	@ Tampa Bay Lightning (1994–95)	13–15–5	17,961	L

April: 6–8–0 (home: 3–3–0; road: 3–5–0)

Game	Date	Score	Opponent	Record	Attendance	Recap
34	April 4, 1995	3–6	@ Buffalo Sabres (1994–95)	13–16–5	13,751	L
35	April 5, 1995	8–4	@ Pittsburgh Penguins (1994–95)	14–16–5	15,091	W
36	April 8, 1995	4–2	Buffalo Sabres (1994–95)	15–16–5	13,409	W
37	April 9, 1995	0–3	Tampa Bay Lightning (1994–95)	15–17–5	10,725	L
38	April 12, 1995	4–2	Ottawa Senators (1994–95)	16–17–5	10,509	W
39	April 14, 1995	4–3 OT	Montreal Canadiens (1994–95)	17–17–5	15,635	W
40	April 16, 1995	2–3	@ New Jersey Devils (1994–95)	17–18–5	13,613	L
41	April 18, 1995	2–1	@ Buffalo Sabres (1994–95)	18–18–5	15,123	W
42	April 20, 1995	2–3	@ New York Rangers (1994–95)	18–19–5	18,200	L
43	April 21, 1995	3–6	@ Washington Capitals (1994–95)	18–20–5	15,721	L
44	April 23, 1995	2–4	Pittsburgh Penguins (1994–95)	18–21–5	14,813	L
45	April 24, 1995	4–3	@ Montreal Canadiens (1994–95)	19–21–5	16,794	W
46	April 26, 1995	0–1	@ Boston Bruins (1994–95)	19–22–5	14,448	L
47	April 28, 1995	3–4	Philadelphia Flyers (1994–95)	19–23–5	15,515	L

May: 0–1–0 (home: 0–0–0; road: 0–1–0)

Game	Date	Score	Opponent	Record	Attendance	Recap
48	May 3, 1995	1–4	@ Quebec Nordiques (1994–95)	19–24–5	15,399	L

Legend: W Win (2 points) L Loss (0 points) T Tie (1 point)

== Player statistics ==
=== Scoring ===
- Position abbreviations: C = Center; D = Defense; G = Goaltender; LW = Left wing; RW = Right wing
- † = Joined team via a transaction (e.g., trade, waivers, signing) during the season. Stats reflect time with the Whalers only.
- ‡ = Left team via a transaction (e.g., trade, waivers, release) during the season. Stats reflect time with the Whalers only.

No.	Player	Pos	Regular season					
No.	Player	Pos	GP	G	A	Pts	+/-	PIM
21	Andrew Cassels	C	46	7	30	37	−3	18
89	Darren Turcotte	C	47	17	18	35	1	22
8	Geoff Sanderson	LW	46	18	14	32	−10	24
12	Steven Rice	RW	40	11	10	21	2	61
28	Paul Ranheim	LW	47	6	14	20	−3	10
4	Frantisek Kucera	D	48	3	17	20	3	30
33	Jimmy Carson	C	38	9	10	19	5	29
18	Robert Kron	LW	37	10	8	18	−3	10
11	Andrei Nikolishin	C	39	8	10	18	7	10
6	Adam Burt	D	46	7	11	18	0	65
16	Pat Verbeek‡	RW	29	7	11	18	0	53
20	Glen Wesley	D	48	2	14	16	−6	50
44	Chris Pronger	D	43	5	9	14	−12	54
26	Jocelyn Lemieux	RW	41	6	5	11	−7	32
13	Ted Drury	C	34	3	6	9	−3	21
22	Mark Janssens	C	46	2	5	7	−8	93
7 (Note: Glynn wore number 3 in his first two games.)	Brian Glynn	D	43	1	6	7	−2	32
14	Kevin Smyth	LW	16	1	5	6	−3	13
32	Igor Chibirev	C	8	3	1	4	1	0
27	Kelly Chase	RW	28	0	4	4	1	141
24	Jim Storm	LW	6	0	3	3	2	0
36	Glen Featherstone†	D	13	1	1	2	−7	32
17	Scott Daniels	LW	12	0	2	2	1	55
1	Sean Burke	G	42	0	1	1		8
23	Marek Malik	D	1	0	1	1	1	0
10	Brad McCrimmon	D	33	0	1	1	7	42
5	Alexander Godynyuk	D	14	0	0	0	1	8
39	Robert Petrovicky	C	2	0	0	0	0	0
35	Jeff Reese	G	11	0	0	0		0
52	Jim Sandlak	RW	13	0	0	0	−10	0

=== Goaltending ===
No.	Player	Regular season									
No.	Player	GP	W	L	T	SA	GA	GAA	SV%	SO	TOI
1	Sean Burke	42	17	19	4	1233	108	2.68	.912	0	2418
35	Jeff Reese	11	2	5	1	234	26	3.27	.889	0	477

== Awards and records ==
=== Awards ===
Type	Award/honor	Recipient	Ref
Team	Booster Club MVP Award	Sean Burke	
Team	Favorite Whaler Award	Jocelyn Lemieux	
Team	Frank Keys Memorial Award	Adam Burt	
Team	Mark Kravitz Award	Sean Burke	
Team	Most Valuable Defenseman	Frantisek Kucera	
Team	Three Star Award of Excellence	Sean Burke	
Team	Top Gun Award	Andrew Cassels	
Team	True Grit Award	Andrei Nikolishin	

=== Milestones ===
Milestone	Player	Date	Ref
First game	Andrei Nikolishin	January 21, 1995	
First game	Marek Malik	January 22, 1995	

== Transactions ==
The Whalers were involved in the following transactions during the 1994–95 season.

=== Trades ===
August 26, 1994	To Boston Bruins 1st round pick in 1995 - Kyle McLaren; 1st round pick in 1996 - Johnathan Aitken; 1st round pick in 1997 - Sergei Samsonov	To Hartford Whalers Glen Wesley
August 30, 1994	To Edmonton Oilers Bryan Marchment (Compensation for Restricted Free Agent)	To Hartford Whalers Steven Rice (Restricted Free Agent)
March 23, 1995	To New York Rangers Pat Verbeek	To Hartford Whalers Glen Featherstone; Michael Stewart; 1st round pick in 1995 - Jean-Sebastien Giguere; 4th round pick in 1996 - Steve Wasylko

=== Waivers ===
January 18, 1995	From Vancouver Canucks Brian Glynn
January 18, 1995	From St. Louis Blues Kelly Chase

=== Free agents ===
Player	Former team
Jeff Chychrun	Edmonton Oilers
Jimmy Carson	Vancouver Canucks
Steven Rice	Edmonton Oilers
Bob Wren	Los Angeles Kings

Player	New team
Marc Potvin	Boston Bruins
Frank Pietrangelo	New York Islanders

== Draft picks ==
Hartford's draft picks at the 1994 NHL entry draft.

Round	#	Player	Position	Nationality	College/Junior/Club team (League)
1	5	Jeff O'Neill	Center	Canada	Guelph Storm (OHL)
4	83	Hnat Domenichelli	Left wing	Canada	Kamloops Blazers (WHL)
5	109	Ryan Risidore	Defense	Canada	Guelph Storm (OHL)
8	187	Tom Buckley	Center	United States	St. Joseph's High School (USHS-NY)
9	213	Ashlin Halfnight	Defense	Canada	Harvard University (ECAC)
9	230	Matt Ball	Right wing	Canada	Detroit Junior Red Wings (OHL)
10	239	Brian Regan	Goaltender	United States	Westminster School (USHS-CT)
11	265	Steve Nimigon	Left wing	Canada	Niagara Falls Thunder (OHL)
S	5	Steve Martins	Center	Canada	Harvard University (ECAC)

== See also ==
- 1994–95 NHL season
