= 1994–95 Boston Bruins season =

NHL team season

1994–95 Boston Bruins
- Division: 3rd Northeast
- Conference: 4th Eastern
- 1994–95 record: 27–18–3
- Home record: 15–7–2
- Road record: 12–11–1
- Goals for: 150
- Goals against: 127

Team information
- General manager: Harry Sinden
- Coach: Brian Sutter
- Captain: Ray Bourque
- Alternate captains: Cam Neely; Adam Oates
- Arena: Boston Garden
- Average attendance: 14,300
- Minor league affiliate: Providence Bruins

Team leaders
- Goals: Cam Neely (27)
- Assists: Adam Oates (41)
- Points: Adam Oates (53)
- Penalty minutes: Brent Hughes (139)
- Plus/minus: Dave Reid (+8)
- Wins: Blaine Lacher (19)
- Goals against average: Blaine Lacher (2.41)

The 1994–95 Boston Bruins season was the team's 71st season. The Bruins had a solid season, finishing fourth in the Eastern Conference with 57 points. During the regular season, they had the most shots on goal (1,651) and allowed the fewest shots on goal (1,168) of any team in the league. They also allowed the fewest powerplay goals (24) and had the best penalty-killing % (86.89%) of all 26 teams.

== Regular season ==
This season was the last at the historic Boston Garden for the Bruins before its closure as the team moved to the Fleet Center (now TD Garden) the following year.

=== Final standings ===
Northeast Division
No.	CR		GP	W	L	T	GF	GA	Pts
1	1	**Quebec Nordiques**	48	30	13	5	185	134	65
2	3	**Pittsburgh Penguins**	48	29	16	3	181	158	61
3	4	**Boston Bruins**	48	27	18	3	150	127	57
4	7	**Buffalo Sabres**	48	22	19	7	130	119	51
5	10	Hartford Whalers	48	19	24	5	127	141	43
6	11	Montreal Canadiens	48	18	23	7	125	148	43
7	14	Ottawa Senators	48	9	34	5	117	174	23

Eastern Conference
R		Div	GP	W	L	T	GF	GA	Pts
**1**	**Quebec Nordiques**	**NE**	**48**	**30**	**13**	**5**	**185**	**134**	65
**2**	**Philadelphia Flyers**	**AT**	**48**	**28**	**16**	**4**	**150**	**132**	60
**3**	**Pittsburgh Penguins**	**NE**	**48**	**29**	**16**	**3**	**181**	**158**	61
**4**	**Boston Bruins**	**NE**	**48**	**27**	**18**	**3**	**150**	**127**	57
**5**	**New Jersey Devils**	**AT**	**48**	**22**	**18**	**8**	**136**	**121**	52
**6**	**Washington Capitals**	**AT**	**48**	**22**	**18**	**8**	**136**	**120**	52
**7**	**Buffalo Sabres**	**NE**	**48**	**22**	**19**	**7**	**130**	**119**	51
**8**	**New York Rangers**	**AT**	**48**	**22**	**23**	**3**	**139**	**134**	47
9	Florida Panthers	AT	48	20	22	6	115	127	46
10	Hartford Whalers	NE	48	19	24	5	127	141	43
11	Montreal Canadiens	NE	48	18	23	7	125	148	43
12	Tampa Bay Lightning	AT	48	17	28	3	120	144	37
13	New York Islanders	AT	48	15	28	5	126	158	35
14	Ottawa Senators	NE	48	9	34	5	117	174	23

Divisions: AT – Atlantic, NE – Northeast

bold – Qualified for playoffs

== Playoffs ==
The Bruins were favored to win their quarterfinal playoff series against the New Jersey Devils, but were shocked by the Devils in the first two games at the Boston Garden by scores of 5–0 and 3–0. The Bruins won game three at the Meadowlands in New Jersey, 3–2, despite being outshot 33 to 17. Boston goaltender Blaine Lacher was solid in net, stopping 31 New Jersey shots. Game four on Friday, May 12 at the Meadowlands started out as a goaltending battle between Lacher and Martin Brodeur. The two teams skated to a 0–0 tie after three regulation periods. This game would prove to be the turning point in the series, as a Boston goal would tie the series at two games apiece and give the Bruins home-ice advantage once again; a New Jersey goal would put the Bruins down three games to one in the series and give the Devils a chance to take the series in game five in Boston. Devils forward Randy McKay ended up scoring the winner at 8:51 of the first overtime period. The Devils closed out the series in game five on Sunday, May 14, in what was the last official NHL game ever played at the Boston Garden. The Devils would go on to win their first Stanley Cup.

== Schedule and results ==
=== Regular season ===
1994–95 regular season
January: 3–2–0 (home: 2–1–0; road: 1–1–0)

Game	Date	Score	Opponent	Record	Recap
1	January 22, 1995	4–1	Philadelphia Flyers (1994–95)	1–0–0	W
2	January 23, 1995	2–1	@ New York Rangers (1994–95)	2–0–0	W
3	January 26, 1995	1–0 OT	New Jersey Devils (1994–95)	3–0–0	W
4	January 28, 1995	1–2	@ Philadelphia Flyers (1994–95)	3–1–0	L
5	January 30, 1995	1–2	Florida Panthers (1994–95)	3–2–0	L

February: 7–4–2 (home: 3–1–1; road: 4–3–1)

Game	Date	Score	Opponent	Record	Recap
6	February 2, 1995	6–4	Ottawa Senators (1994–95)	4–2–0	W
7	February 4, 1995	5–4	Hartford Whalers (1994–95)	5–2–0	W
8	February 7, 1995	7–4	Montreal Canadiens (1994–95)	6–2–0	W
9	February 9, 1995	3–4	Quebec Nordiques (1994–95)	6–3–0	L
10	February 11, 1995	1–1 OT	Washington Capitals (1994–95)	6–3–1	T
11	February 12, 1995	2–1	@ Buffalo Sabres (1994–95)	7–3–1	W
12	February 14, 1995	3–5	@ Pittsburgh Penguins (1994–95)	7–4–1	L
13	February 17, 1995	5–4	@ Florida Panthers (1994–95)	8–4–1	W
14	February 18, 1995	1–3	@ Tampa Bay Lightning (1994–95)	8–5–1	L
15	February 22, 1995	2–3 OT	@ Hartford Whalers (1994–95)	8–6–1	L
16	February 23, 1995	3–2	@ New Jersey Devils (1994–95)	9–6–1	W
17	February 25, 1995	1–1 OT	@ Quebec Nordiques (1994–95)	9–6–2	T
18	February 27, 1995	2–0	@ Ottawa Senators (1994–95)	10–6–2	W

March: 7–6–0 (home: 4–3–0; road: 3–3–0)

Game	Date	Score	Opponent	Record	Recap
19	March 2, 1995	7–2	New Jersey Devils (1994–95)	11–6–2	W
20	March 4, 1995	3–4 OT	Pittsburgh Penguins (1994–95)	11–7–2	L
21	March 5, 1995	5–2	@ Hartford Whalers (1994–95)	12–7–2	W
22	March 7, 1995	1–3	Washington Capitals (1994–95)	12–8–2	L
23	March 9, 1995	2–3	@ Philadelphia Flyers (1994–95)	12–9–2	L
24	March 11, 1995	0–2	Florida Panthers (1994–95)	12–10–2	L
25	March 16, 1995	6–0	Montreal Canadiens (1994–95)	13–10–2	W
26	March 18, 1995	4–3	New York Islanders (1994–95)	14–10–2	W
27	March 19, 1995	3–4 OT	@ New Jersey Devils (1994–95)	14–11–2	L
28	March 22, 1995	2–6	@ Quebec Nordiques (1994–95)	14–12–2	L
29	March 24, 1995	4–3 OT	@ Tampa Bay Lightning (1994–95)	15–12–2	W
30	March 28, 1995	5–1	Philadelphia Flyers (1994–95)	16–12–2	W
31	March 30, 1995	3–2	@ New York Islanders (1994–95)	17–12–2	W

April: 8–6–1 (home: 5–2–1; road: 3–4–0)

Game	Date	Score	Opponent	Record	Recap
32	April 1, 1995	2–3	New York Rangers (1994–95)	17–13–2	L
33	April 2, 1995	1–2	@ Washington Capitals (1994–95)	17–14–2	L
34	April 6, 1995	1–1 OT	Buffalo Sabres (1994–95)	17–14–3	T
35	April 8, 1995	5–1	Tampa Bay Lightning (1994–95)	18–14–3	W
36	April 9, 1995	6–5	@ Buffalo Sabres (1994–95)	19–14–3	W
37	April 12, 1995	0–4	Quebec Nordiques (1994–95)	19–15–3	L
38	April 14, 1995	3–5	@ New York Rangers (1994–95)	19–16–3	L
39	April 15, 1995	3–2	@ Montreal Canadiens (1994–95)	20–16–3	W
40	April 19, 1995	4–1	Buffalo Sabres (1994–95)	21–16–3	W
41	April 20, 1995	6–5	@ Ottawa Senators (1994–95)	22–16–3	W
42	April 23, 1995	5–4	New York Rangers (1994–95)	23–16–3	W
43	April 24, 1995	3–5	@ New York Islanders (1994–95)	23–17–3	L
44	April 26, 1995	1–0	Hartford Whalers (1994–95)	24–17–3	W
45	April 28, 1995	1–4	@ Pittsburgh Penguins (1994–95)	24–18–3	L
46	April 30, 1995	5–2	Pittsburgh Penguins (1994–95)	25–18–3	W

May: 2–0–0 (home: 1–0–0; road: 1–0–0)

Game	Date	Score	Opponent	Record	Recap
47	May 1, 1995	5–4	Ottawa Senators (1994–95)	26–18–3	W
48	May 3, 1995	4–2	@ Montreal Canadiens (1994–95)	27–18–3	W

Legend: W Win (2 points) L Loss (0 points) T Tie (1 point)

=== Playoffs ===
1995 Stanley Cup playoffs
Eastern Conference Quarterfinals vs. (5) New Jersey Devils – Devils win 4–1

Game	Date	Score	Opponent	Attendance	Series	Recap
1	May 7, 1995	0–5	New Jersey Devils	14,448	Devils lead 1–0	L
2	May 8, 1995	0–3	New Jersey Devils	14,448	Devils lead 2–0	L
3	May 10, 1995	3–2	@ New Jersey Devils	16,523	Devils lead 2–1	W
4	May 12, 1995	0–1 OT	@ New Jersey Devils	19,040	Devils lead 3–1	L
5	May 14, 1995	2–3	New Jersey Devils	14,448	Devils win 4–1	L

Legend: W Win L Loss

== Player statistics ==
=== Scoring ===
- Position abbreviations: C = Center; D = Defense; G = Goaltender; LW = Left wing; RW = Right wing
- † = Joined team via a transaction (e.g., trade, waivers, signing) during the season. Stats reflect time with the Bruins only.
- ‡ = Left team via a transaction (e.g., trade, waivers, release) during the season. Stats reflect time with the Bruins only.

No.	Player	Pos	Regular season						Playoffs					
No.	Player	Pos	GP	G	A	Pts	+/-	PIM	GP	G	A	Pts	+/-	PIM
12	Adam Oates	C	48	12	41	53	−11	8	5	1	0	1	−6	2
77	Ray Bourque	D	46	12	31	43	3	20	5	0	3	3	−5	0
8	Cam Neely	RW	42	27	14	41	7	72	5	2	0	2	−4	2
20	Bryan Smolinski	LW	44	18	13	31	−3	31	5	0	1	1	−2	4
19	Mariusz Czerkawski	RW	47	12	14	26	4	31	5	1	0	1	0	0
26	Mats Naslund†	LW	34	8	14	22	−4	4	5	1	0	1	−3	0
32	Don Sweeney	D	47	3	19	22	6	24	5	0	0	0	−4	4
21	Ted Donato	C	47	10	10	20	3	10	5	0	0	0	0	4
22	Jozef Stumpel	C	44	5	13	18	4	8	5	0	0	0	−1	0
23	Steve Heinze	RW	36	7	9	16	0	23	5	0	0	0	0	0
6	Alexei Kasatonov	D	44	2	14	16	−2	33	5	0	0	0	0	2
18	Brent Hughes	LW	44	6	6	12	6	139	5	0	0	0	−2	4
27	Steve Leach	RW	35	5	6	11	−3	68	—	—	—	—	—	—
38	Jon Rohloff	D	34	3	8	11	1	39	5	0	0	0	−1	6
17	Dave Reid	C	38	5	5	10	8	10	5	0	0	0	1	0
45	Sandy Moger	RW	18	2	6	8	−1	6	—	—	—	—	—	—
44	Glen Murray	LW	35	5	2	7	−11	46	2	0	0	0	−1	2
34	David Shaw	D	44	3	4	7	−9	36	5	0	1	1	−2	4
36	John Gruden	D	38	0	6	6	3	22	—	—	—	—	—	—
28	Jamie Huscroft	D	34	0	6	6	−3	103	5	0	0	0	0	11
48	Fred Knipscheer	LW	16	3	1	4	1	2	4	0	0	0	0	0
42	Mikko Makela	RW	11	1	2	3	0	0	—	—	—	—	—	—
40	Daniel Lacroix‡	C	23	1	0	1	−2	38	—	—	—	—	—	—
40	Brett Harkins	C	1	0	1	1	0	0	—	—	—	—	—	—
31	Blaine Lacher	G	35	0	1	1		4	5	0	0	0		0
29	Marc Potvin	RW	6	0	1	1	1	4	—	—	—	—	—	—
1	Craig Billington†	G	8	0	0	0		2	1	0	0	0		0
13	Grigori Panteleev	LW	1	0	0	0	0	0	—	—	—	—	—	—
37	Vincent Riendeau	G	11	0	0	0		2	—	—	—	—	—	—
49	Jeff Serowik	D	1	0	0	0	1	0	—	—	—	—	—	—
16	Cam Stewart	C	5	0	0	0	0	2	—	—	—	—	—	—
41	Guy Larose	C	—	—	—	—	—	—	4	0	0	0	0	0

=== Goaltending ===
- † = Joined team via a transaction (e.g., trade, waivers, signing) during the season. Stats reflect time with the Bruins only.

No.	Player	Regular season											Playoffs									
No.	Player	GP	GS	W	L	T	SA	GA	GAA	SV%	SO	TOI	GP	GS	W	L	SA	GA	GAA	SV%	SO	TOI
31	Blaine Lacher	35	34	19	11	2	805	79	2.41	.902	4	1,965:00	5	5	1	4	125	12	2.55	.904	0	282:48
1	Craig Billington†	8	6	5	1	0	140	19	3.05	.864	0	373:18	1	0	0	0	10	1	2.40	.900	0	25:01
37	Vincent Riendeau	11	8	3	6	1	221	27	2.86	.878	0	565:29	—	—	—	—	—	—	—	—	—	—

== Awards and records ==
=== Awards ===
Type	Award/honor	Recipient	Ref
League (annual)	NHL Second All-Star team	Ray Bourque (Defense)	
League (in-season)	NHL Rookie of the Month	Blaine Lacher (February)	
Team	Elizabeth C. Dufresne Trophy	Cam Neely	
Team	Seventh Player Award	Blaine Lacher	
Team	Three Stars Awards	Cam Neely (1st)	
Team	Three Stars Awards	Ray Bourque (2nd)	
Team	Three Stars Awards	Blaine Lacher (3rd)	

=== Milestones ===
Milestone	Player	Date	Ref
First game	Blaine Lacher	January 22, 1995	
First game	Jon Rohloff	January 30, 1995	
First game	Sandy Moger	March 22, 1995	
First game	Brett Harkins	April 24, 1995	
600th assist	Adam Oates	April 8, 1995	

== Draft picks ==
Boston's draft picks at the 1994 NHL entry draft in Hartford, Connecticut.

Round	Pick	Player	Nationality	College/junior/club team
1	21	Evgeni Ryabchikov (G)	Russia	Molot Perm (Russia)
2	47	Daniel Goneau (LW)	Canada	Laval Titan (QMJHL)
4	99	Eric Nickulas (RW)	United States	Cushing Academy (USHS-MA)
5	125	Darren Wright (D)	Canada	Prince Albert Raiders (WHL)
6	151	Andre Roy (RW)	United States	Chicoutimi Saguenéens (QMJHL)
7	177	Jeremy Schaefer (LW)	Canada	Medicine Hat Tigers (WHL)
9	229	John Grahame (G)	United States	Lake Superior State University (CCHA)
10	255	Neil Savary (G)	Canada	Hull Olympiques (QMJHL)
11	281	Andrei Yakhanov (D)	Russia	Salavat Yulaev Ufa (Russia)
