= 1994–95 Buffalo Sabres season =

NHL hockey team season

1994–95 Buffalo Sabres
- Division: 4th Northeast
- Conference: 7th Eastern
- 1994–95 record: 22–19–7
- Home record: 15–8–1
- Road record: 7–11–6
- Goals for: 130
- Goals against: 119

Team information
- General manager: John Muckler
- Coach: John Muckler
- Captain: Pat LaFontaine
- Arena: Buffalo Memorial Auditorium
- Average attendance: 15,052
- Minor league affiliates: Rochester Americans; South Carolina Stingrays

Team leaders
- Goals: Donald Audette (24)
- Assists: Alexander Mogilny (28)
- Points: Alexander Mogilny (47)
- Penalty minutes: Rob Ray (173)
- Plus/minus: Yuri Khmylev (+8)
- Wins: Dominik Hasek (19)
- Goals against average: Dominik Hasek (2.11)

The 1994–95 Buffalo Sabres season was the Sabres' 25th season in the National Hockey League (NHL). The season was marked by injuries to star forwards Dale Hawerchuk and Pat LaFontaine, who each missed over half of the lockout-shortened season. Donald Audette, Alexander Mogilny and Wayne Presley filled the offensive hole left by the absence of LaFontaine and Hawerchuk, as Audette led the team in goals (24), Mogilny led in assists (28) and points (47) and Presley led in shorthanded goals (5). Thanks to Presley's contribution in this offensive category, the Sabres tied the Washington Capitals with the most shorthanded goals scored by any team during the regular season (13). Dominik Hasek led all goaltenders in save percentage with .930, goals against average with 2.11 (tied with Rick Tabaracci of the Washington Capitals/Calgary Flames) and shutouts with 5 (tied with Ed Belfour of the Chicago Blackhawks). The Sabres were one of only three teams (the other two being the Toronto Maple Leafs and the Quebec Nordiques) not to be shut out in any of their regular season games or playoff games.

The team's playoff run was brief, as they were eliminated in the first round by the Philadelphia Flyers in five games.

== Regular season ==
On April 4, 1995, the Sabres scored three short-handed goals in a 6–3 home win over the Hartford Whalers.

The Sabres scored the fewest even-strength goals during the regular season (72).

=== Season standings ===
Northeast Division
No.	CR		GP	W	L	T	GF	GA	Pts
1	1	**Quebec Nordiques**	48	30	13	5	185	134	65
2	3	**Pittsburgh Penguins**	48	29	16	3	181	158	61
3	4	**Boston Bruins**	48	27	18	3	150	127	57
4	7	**Buffalo Sabres**	48	22	19	7	130	119	51
5	10	Hartford Whalers	48	19	24	5	127	141	43
6	11	Montreal Canadiens	48	18	23	7	125	148	43
7	14	Ottawa Senators	48	9	34	5	117	174	23

Eastern Conference
R		Div	GP	W	L	T	GF	GA	Pts
**1**	**Quebec Nordiques**	**NE**	**48**	**30**	**13**	**5**	**185**	**134**	65
**2**	**Philadelphia Flyers**	**AT**	**48**	**28**	**16**	**4**	**150**	**132**	60
**3**	**Pittsburgh Penguins**	**NE**	**48**	**29**	**16**	**3**	**181**	**158**	61
**4**	**Boston Bruins**	**NE**	**48**	**27**	**18**	**3**	**150**	**127**	57
**5**	**New Jersey Devils**	**AT**	**48**	**22**	**18**	**8**	**136**	**121**	52
**6**	**Washington Capitals**	**AT**	**48**	**22**	**18**	**8**	**136**	**120**	52
**7**	**Buffalo Sabres**	**NE**	**48**	**22**	**19**	**7**	**130**	**119**	51
**8**	**New York Rangers**	**AT**	**48**	**22**	**23**	**3**	**139**	**134**	47
9	Florida Panthers	AT	48	20	22	6	115	127	46
10	Hartford Whalers	NE	48	19	24	5	127	141	43
11	Montreal Canadiens	NE	48	18	23	7	125	148	43
12	Tampa Bay Lightning	AT	48	17	28	3	120	144	37
13	New York Islanders	AT	48	15	28	5	126	158	35
14	Ottawa Senators	NE	48	9	34	5	117	174	23

Divisions: AT – Atlantic, NE – Northeast

bold – Qualified for playoffs

== Schedule and results ==
=== Regular season ===
1994–95 regular season
January: 3–2–1 (home: 1–1–0; road: 2–1–1)

Game	Date	Score	Opponent	Record	Recap
1	January 20, 1995	2–1	@ New York Rangers (1994–95)	1–0–0	W
2	January 22, 1995	5–2	@ Tampa Bay Lightning (1994–95)	2–0–0	W
3	January 25, 1995	2–1	New Jersey Devils (1994–95)	3–0–0	W
4	January 27, 1995	3–7	Quebec Nordiques (1994–95)	3–1–0	L
5	January 28, 1995	2–2 OT	@ Ottawa Senators (1994–95)	3–1–1	T
6	January 31, 1995	1–2	@ New Jersey Devils (1994–95)	3–2–1	L

February: 4–5–2 (home: 2–3–1; road: 2–2–1)

Game	Date	Score	Opponent	Record	Recap
7	February 2, 1995	1–0	@ Washington Capitals (1994–95)	4–2–1	W
8	February 4, 1995	2–4	@ Philadelphia Flyers (1994–95)	4–3–1	L
9	February 5, 1995	2–1	Tampa Bay Lightning (1994–95)	5–3–1	W
10	February 7, 1995	2–1	Washington Capitals (1994–95)	6–3–1	W
11	February 11, 1995	1–2	@ New York Islanders (1994–95)	6–4–1	L
12	February 12, 1995	1–2	Boston Bruins (1994–95)	6–5–1	L
13	February 15, 1995	1–2	New York Rangers (1994–95)	6–6–1	L
14	February 19, 1995	3–3 OT	@ Pittsburgh Penguins (1994–95)	6–6–2	T
15	February 22, 1995	3–3 OT	New York Islanders (1994–95)	6–6–3	T
16	February 25, 1995	3–1	@ Hartford Whalers (1994–95)	7–6–3	W
17	February 26, 1995	2–4	New York Rangers (1994–95)	7–7–3	L

March: 7–5–2 (home: 6–2–0; road: 1–3–2)

Game	Date	Score	Opponent	Record	Recap
18	March 2, 1995	6–3	Pittsburgh Penguins (1994–95)	8–7–3	W
19	March 4, 1995	1–1 OT	@ Quebec Nordiques (1994–95)	8–7–4	T
20	March 5, 1995	4–1	Montreal Canadiens (1994–95)	9–7–4	W
21	March 8, 1995	2–2 OT	@ Montreal Canadiens (1994–95)	9–7–5	T
22	March 11, 1995	2–6	@ Pittsburgh Penguins (1994–95)	9–8–5	L
23	March 14, 1995	2–1 OT	@ Florida Panthers (1994–95)	10–8–5	W
24	March 16, 1995	6–3	New York Islanders (1994–95)	11–8–5	W
25	March 18, 1995	3–4 OT	@ Ottawa Senators (1994–95)	11–9–5	L
26	March 19, 1995	1–6	Tampa Bay Lightning (1994–95)	11–10–5	L
27	March 21, 1995	2–3	Pittsburgh Penguins (1994–95)	11–11–5	L
28	March 24, 1995	3–0	Florida Panthers (1994–95)	12–11–5	W
29	March 26, 1995	1–3	@ Philadelphia Flyers (1994–95)	12–12–5	L
30	March 28, 1995	5–3	Quebec Nordiques (1994–95)	13–12–5	W
31	March 30, 1995	7–0	Ottawa Senators (1994–95)	14–12–5	W

April: 6–7–2 (home: 4–2–0; road: 2–5–2)

Game	Date	Score	Opponent	Record	Recap
32	April 1, 1995	5–1	@ New York Islanders (1994–95)	15–12–5	W
33	April 4, 1995	6–3	Hartford Whalers (1994–95)	16–12–5	W
34	April 6, 1995	1–1 OT	@ Boston Bruins (1994–95)	16–12–6	T
35	April 8, 1995	2–4	@ Hartford Whalers (1994–95)	16–13–6	L
36	April 9, 1995	5–6	Boston Bruins (1994–95)	16–14–6	L
37	April 12, 1995	1–3	@ New York Rangers (1994–95)	16–15–6	L
38	April 14, 1995	2–5	@ Quebec Nordiques (1994–95)	16–16–6	L
39	April 16, 1995	2–1	Ottawa Senators (1994–95)	17–16–6	W
40	April 18, 1995	1–2	Hartford Whalers (1994–95)	17–17–6	L
41	April 19, 1995	1–4	@ Boston Bruins (1994–95)	17–18–6	L
42	April 23, 1995	4–2	Philadelphia Flyers (1994–95)	18–18–6	W
43	April 24, 1995	3–1	@ Tampa Bay Lightning (1994–95)	19–18–6	W
44	April 26, 1995	5–0	Florida Panthers (1994–95)	20–18–6	W
45	April 28, 1995	1–5	@ Washington Capitals (1994–95)	20–19–6	L
46	April 29, 1995	3–3 OT	@ Montreal Canadiens (1994–95)	20–19–7	T

May: 2–0–0 (home: 2–0–0; road: 0–0–0)

Game	Date	Score	Opponent	Record	Recap
47	May 1, 1995	2–0	Montreal Canadiens (1994–95)	21–19–7	W
48	May 3, 1995	5–4	New Jersey Devils (1994–95)	22–19–7	W

Legend: W Win (2 points) L Loss (0 points) T Tie (1 point)

=== Playoffs ===
1995 Stanley Cup playoffs
Eastern Conference Quarterfinals vs. (2) Philadelphia Flyers – Flyers win 4–1

Game	Date	Score	Opponent	Series	Recap
1	May 7, 1995	3–4 OT	@ Philadelphia Flyers	Flyers lead 1–0	L
2	May 8, 1995	1–3	@ Philadelphia Flyers	Flyers lead 2–0	L
3	May 10, 1995	3–1	Philadelphia Flyers	Flyers lead 2–1	W
4	May 12, 1995	2–4	Philadelphia Flyers	Flyers lead 3–1	L
5	May 14, 1995	4–6	@ Philadelphia Flyers	Flyers win 4–1	L

Legend: W Win L Loss

== Player statistics ==
=== Scoring ===
- Position abbreviations: C = Center; D = Defense; G = Goaltender; LW = Left wing; RW = Right wing
- † = Joined team via a transaction (e.g., trade, waivers, signing) during the season. Stats reflect time with the Sabres only.
- ‡ = Left team via a transaction (e.g., trade, waivers, release) during the season. Stats reflect time with the Sabres only.

No.	Player	Pos	Regular season						Playoffs					
No.	Player	Pos	GP	G	A	Pts	+/-	PIM	GP	G	A	Pts	+/-	PIM
89	Alexander Mogilny	RW	44	19	28	47	0	36	5	3	2	5	−6	2
28	Donald Audette	RW	46	24	13	37	−3	27	5	1	1	2	−2	4
16	Pat LaFontaine	C	22	12	15	27	2	4	5	2	2	4	−2	2
13	Yuri Khmylev	LW	48	8	17	25	8	14	5	0	1	1	−1	8
26	Derek Plante	C	47	3	19	22	−4	12	—	—	—	—	—	—
8	Doug Bodger	D	44	3	17	20	−3	47	5	0	4	4	1	0
18	Wayne Presley	RW	46	14	5	19	5	41	5	3	1	4	3	8
10	Dale Hawerchuk	C	23	5	11	16	−2	2	2	0	0	0	−1	0
14	Dave Hannan	C	42	4	12	16	3	32	5	0	2	2	2	2
43	Jason Dawe	RW	42	7	4	11	−6	19	5	2	1	3	−2	6
17 (Note: Simpson wore number 22 until Huddy was acquired.)	Craig Simpson	LW	24	4	7	11	−5	26	—	—	—	—	—	—
42	Richard Smehlik	D	39	4	7	11	5	46	5	0	0	0	−1	2
3	Garry Galley†	D	14	1	9	10	4	10	5	0	3	3	−3	4
20	Bob Sweeney	C	45	5	4	9	−6	18	5	0	0	0	−1	4
44 (Note: Zhitnik wore number 4 in his first ten games.)	Alexei Zhitnik†	D	21	2	5	7	−3	34	5	0	1	1	−7	14
27	Brad May	LW	33	3	3	6	5	87	4	0	0	0	0	2
22	Charlie Huddy†	D	32	2	4	6	−1	36	3	0	0	0	1	0
5	Craig Muni	D	40	0	6	6	−4	36	5	0	1	1	0	2
24	Philippe Boucher‡	D	9	1	4	5	6	0	—	—	—	—	—	—
7	Petr Svoboda‡	D	26	0	5	5	−5	60	—	—	—	—	—	—
33	Mark Astley	D	14	2	1	3	−2	12	2	0	0	0	−2	0
29	Scott Pearson†	LW	14	2	1	3	−3	20	5	0	0	0	−1	4
6	Doug Houda	D	28	1	2	3	1	68	—	—	—	—	—	—
41	Ken Sutton‡	D	12	1	2	3	−2	30	—	—	—	—	—	—
19	Brian Holzinger	C	4	0	3	3	2	0	4	2	1	3	−3	2
32	Rob Ray	RW	47	0	3	3	−4	173	5	0	0	0	0	14
36	Matthew Barnaby	RW	23	1	1	2	−2	116	—	—	—	—	—	—
37	Curtis Brown	C	1	1	1	2	2	2	—	—	—	—	—	—
9	Viktor Gordiouk	LW	10	0	2	2	−3	0	—	—	—	—	—	—
76	Wayne Primeau	C	1	1	0	1	−2	0	—	—	—	—	—	—
12	Peter Ambroziak	LW	12	0	1	1	−1	0	—	—	—	—	—	—
31	Grant Fuhr‡	G	3	0	0	0		0	—	—	—	—	—	—
39	Dominik Hasek	G	41	0	0	0		2	5	0	0	0		0
44	Doug MacDonald	LW	2	0	0	0	−1	0	—	—	—	—	—	—
3	Dean Melanson	D	5	0	0	0	−1	4	—	—	—	—	—	—
35	Robb Stauber†	G	6	0	0	0		0	—	—	—	—	—	—
29	Denis Tsygurov‡	D	4	0	0	0	−1	4	—	—	—	—	—	—

=== Goaltending ===
- † = Joined team via a transaction (e.g., trade, waivers, signing) during the season. Stats reflect time with the Sabres only.
- ‡ = Left team via a transaction (e.g., trade, waivers, release) during the season. Stats reflect time with the Sabres only.

No.	Player	Regular season										Playoffs								
No.	Player	GP	W	L	T	SA	GA	GAA	SV%	SO	TOI	GP	W	L	SA	GA	GAA	SV%	SO	TOI
39	Dominik Hasek	41	19	14	7	1221	85	2.11	.930	5	2416	5	1	4	131	18	3.50	.863	0	309
35	Robb Stauber†	6	2	3	0	150	20	3.79	.867	0	317	—	—	—	—	—	—	—	—	—
31	Grant Fuhr‡	3	1	2	0	85	12	4.00	.859	0	180	—	—	—	—	—	—	—	—	—

== Awards and records ==
=== Awards ===
Dominik Hasek was also a finalist for the Hart Memorial Trophy.

Type	Award/honor	Recipient	Ref
League (annual)	Bill Masterton Memorial Trophy	Pat LaFontaine	
League (annual)	NHL First All-Star team	Dominik Hasek (Goaltender)	
League (annual)	Vezina Trophy	Dominik Hasek	

=== Milestones ===
Milestone	Player	Date	Ref
First game	Dean Melanson	February 19, 1995	
First game	Peter Ambroziak	March 4, 1995	
First game	Brian Holzinger	April 16, 1995	
First game	Curtis Brown	May 3, 1995	
First game	Wayne Primeau	May 3, 1995	
400th goal	Pat LaFontaine	April 14, 1995	

== Draft picks ==
Buffalo's draft picks at the 1994 NHL entry draft in Hartford, Connecticut.

Round	Pick	Player	Nationality	College/junior/club team
1	17	Wayne Primeau (C)	Canada	Owen Sound Platers (OHL)
2	43	Curtis Brown (LW)	Canada	Moose Jaw Warriors (WHL)
3	69	Rumun Ndur (D)	Canada	Guelph Storm (OHL)
5	121	Sergei Klimentiev (D)	Ukraine	Medicine Hat Tigers (WHL)
6	147	Cal Benazic (D)	Canada	Medicine Hat Tigers (WHL)
7	168	Steve Plouffe (G)	Canada	Granby Bisons (QMJHL)
7	173	Shane Hnidy (D)	Canada	Prince Albert Raiders (WHL)
7	176	Steve Webb (RW)	Canada	Peterborough Petes (OHL)
8	199	Bob Westerby (LW)	Canada	Kamloops Blazers (WHL)
9	225	Craig Millar (D)	Canada	Swift Current Broncos (WHL)
10	251	Mark Polak (C)	Canada	Medicine Hat Tigers (WHL)
11	277	Shayne Wright (D)	Canada	Owen Sound Platers (OHL)
