= 1994–95 Tampa Bay Lightning season =

National Hockey League team season

1994–95 Tampa Bay Lightning
- Division: 6th Atlantic
- Conference: 12th Eastern
- 1994–95 record: 17–28–3
- Home record: 10–14–0
- Road record: 7–14–3
- Goals for: 120
- Goals against: 144

Team information
- General manager: Phil Esposito
- Coach: Terry Crisp
- Captain: Vacant
- Arena: ThunderDome
- Average attendance: 19,932
- Minor league affiliates: Atlanta Knights; Nashville Knights

Team leaders
- Goals: Brian Bradley, Petr Klima (13)
- Assists: Brian Bradley (27)
- Points: Brian Bradley (40)
- Penalty minutes: Enrico Ciccone (225)
- Plus/minus: Adrien Plavsic (+5)
- Wins: Daren Puppa (14)
- Goals against average: Daren Puppa (2.68)

The 1994–95 Tampa Bay Lightning season was the third season in franchise history. The team traded defenseman Shawn Chambers to the New Jersey Devils and forward Denis Savard to the Chicago Blackhawks; both players went on to have memorable playoff performances in 1995. Brian Bradley and Petr Klima both led the team in goals with 13, while Rob Zamuner led the team with 3 shorthanded goals. By April 21, the Lightning had a 17–22–3 record with only 118 goals against in 42 games. Although they had only scored 109 goals, Darren Puppa's solid goaltending kept the team ahead of the New York Islanders in the Atlantic Division standings. However, the Lightning finished the season with six-straight losses, getting outscored 26–11 to finish 17–28–3 for 37 points. An Islanders' loss to the Philadelphia Flyers on May 2 ensured that the Lightning would not finish last place in the division.

== Regular season ==
=== Final standings ===
Atlantic Division
No.	CR		GP	W	L	T	GF	GA	Pts
1	2	**Philadelphia Flyers**	48	28	16	4	150	132	60
2	5	**New Jersey Devils**	48	22	18	8	136	121	52
3	6	**Washington Capitals**	48	22	18	8	136	120	52
4	8	**New York Rangers**	48	22	23	3	139	134	47
5	9	Florida Panthers	48	20	22	6	115	127	46
6	12	Tampa Bay Lightning	48	17	28	3	120	144	37
7	13	New York Islanders	48	15	28	5	126	158	35

Note: No. = Division rank, CR = Conference rank, W = Wins, L = Losses, T = Ties, GF = Goals For, GA = Goals Against, Pts = Points
Teams that qualified for the playoffs are highlighted in bold.

Eastern Conference
R		Div	GP	W	L	T	GF	GA	Pts
**1**	**Quebec Nordiques**	**NE**	**48**	**30**	**13**	**5**	**185**	**134**	65
**2**	**Philadelphia Flyers**	**AT**	**48**	**28**	**16**	**4**	**150**	**132**	60
**3**	**Pittsburgh Penguins**	**NE**	**48**	**29**	**16**	**3**	**181**	**158**	61
**4**	**Boston Bruins**	**NE**	**48**	**27**	**18**	**3**	**150**	**127**	57
**5**	**New Jersey Devils**	**AT**	**48**	**22**	**18**	**8**	**136**	**121**	52
**6**	**Washington Capitals**	**AT**	**48**	**22**	**18**	**8**	**136**	**120**	52
**7**	**Buffalo Sabres**	**NE**	**48**	**22**	**19**	**7**	**130**	**119**	51
**8**	**New York Rangers**	**AT**	**48**	**22**	**23**	**3**	**139**	**134**	47
9	Florida Panthers	AT	48	20	22	6	115	127	46
10	Hartford Whalers	NE	48	19	24	5	127	141	43
11	Montreal Canadiens	NE	48	18	23	7	125	148	43
12	Tampa Bay Lightning	AT	48	17	28	3	120	144	37
13	New York Islanders	AT	48	15	28	5	126	158	35
14	Ottawa Senators	NE	48	9	34	5	117	174	23

Divisions: AT – Atlantic, NE – Northeast

bold – Qualified for playoffs

== Schedule and results ==
1994–95 regular season
January: 3–3–0 (home: 2–2–0; road: 1–1–0)

Game	Date	Score	Opponent	Record	Recap
1	January 20, 1995	3–5	Pittsburgh Penguins (1994–95)	0–1–0	L
2	January 22, 1995	2–5	Buffalo Sabres (1994–95)	0–2–0	L
3	January 25, 1995	3–2	Florida Panthers (1994–95)	1–2–0	W
4	January 26, 1995	2–4	@ Florida Panthers (1994–95)	1–3–0	L
5	January 28, 1995	4–1	@ New York Islanders (1994–95)	2–3–0	W
6	January 31, 1995	4–1	Montreal Canadiens (1994–95)	3–3–0	W

February: 5–6–2 (home: 3–4–0; road: 2–2–2)

Game	Date	Score	Opponent	Record	Recap
7	February 2, 1995	3–3 OT	@ New York Rangers (1994–95)	3–3–1	T
8	February 4, 1995	3–6	@ Pittsburgh Penguins (1994–95)	3–4–1	L
9	February 5, 1995	1–2	@ Buffalo Sabres (1994–95)	3–5–1	L
10	February 7, 1995	5–2	New York Islanders (1994–95)	4–5–1	W
11	February 10, 1995	4–3	Hartford Whalers (1994–95)	5–5–1	W
12	February 11, 1995	2–3	New York Rangers (1994–95)	5–6–1	L
13	February 14, 1995	2–5	Philadelphia Flyers (1994–95)	5–7–1	L
14	February 17, 1995	1–2	Ottawa Senators (1994–95)	5–8–1	L
15	February 18, 1995	3–1	Boston Bruins (1994–95)	6–8–1	W
16	February 20, 1995	1–3	New York Rangers (1994–95)	6–9–1	L
17	February 23, 1995	4–1	@ New York Islanders (1994–95)	7–9–1	W
18	February 24, 1995	4–2	@ Pittsburgh Penguins (1994–95)	8–9–1	W
19	February 26, 1995	1–1 OT	@ Washington Capitals (1994–95)	8–9–2	T

March: 5–8–0 (home: 2–5–0; road: 3–3–0)

Game	Date	Score	Opponent	Record	Recap
20	March 1, 1995	2–8	@ Quebec Nordiques (1994–95)	8–10–2	L
21	March 2, 1995	3–2 OT	@ Ottawa Senators (1994–95)	9–10–2	W
22	March 4, 1995	2–3 OT	@ Hartford Whalers (1994–95)	9–11–2	L
23	March 7, 1995	3–4	Philadelphia Flyers (1994–95)	9–12–2	L
24	March 10, 1995	2–3	New Jersey Devils (1994–95)	9–13–2	L
25	March 12, 1995	1–3	@ Washington Capitals (1994–95)	9–14–2	L
26	March 13, 1995	0–3	Washington Capitals (1994–95)	9–15–2	L
27	March 18, 1995	2–1	@ New Jersey Devils (1994–95)	10–15–2	W
28	March 19, 1995	6–1	@ Buffalo Sabres (1994–95)	11–15–2	W
29	March 24, 1995	3–4 OT	Boston Bruins (1994–95)	11–16–2	L
30	March 27, 1995	3–2 OT	Montreal Canadiens (1994–95)	12–16–2	W
31	March 29, 1995	2–4	Washington Capitals (1994–95)	12–17–2	L
32	March 31, 1995	2–0	Hartford Whalers (1994–95)	13–17–2	W

April: 4–10–1 (home: 3–2–0; road: 1–8–1)

Game	Date	Score	Opponent	Record	Recap
33	April 2, 1995	1–4	Florida Panthers (1994–95)	13–18–2	L
34	April 4, 1995	1–1 OT	@ New Jersey Devils (1994–95)	13–18–3	T
35	April 6, 1995	4–5	@ Philadelphia Flyers (1994–95)	13–19–3	L
36	April 8, 1995	1–5	@ Boston Bruins (1994–95)	13–20–3	L
37	April 9, 1995	3–0	@ Hartford Whalers (1994–95)	14–20–3	W
38	April 11, 1995	5–2	New York Islanders (1994–95)	15–20–3	W
39	April 14, 1995	2–3	@ Philadelphia Flyers (1994–95)	15–21–3	L
40	April 16, 1995	1–4	@ Florida Panthers (1994–95)	15–22–3	L
41	April 18, 1995	3–2	New Jersey Devils (1994–95)	16–22–3	W
42	April 20, 1995	5–2	Quebec Nordiques (1994–95)	17–22–3	W
43	April 22, 1995	1–3	@ Montreal Canadiens (1994–95)	17–23–3	L
44	April 24, 1995	1–3	Buffalo Sabres (1994–95)	17–24–3	L
45	April 26, 1995	4–6	@ New York Rangers (1994–95)	17–25–3	L
46	April 27, 1995	1–6	@ Ottawa Senators (1994–95)	17–26–3	L
47	April 29, 1995	1–4	@ Quebec Nordiques (1994–95)	17–27–3	L

May: 0–1–0 (home: 0–1–0; road: 0–0–0)

Game	Date	Score	Opponent	Record	Recap
48	May 3, 1995	3–4	Ottawa Senators (1994–95)	17–28–3	L

Legend: W Win (2 points) L Loss (0 points) T Tie (1 point)

== Player statistics ==
=== Scoring ===
- Position abbreviations: C = Center; D = Defense; G = Goaltender; LW = Left wing; RW = Right wing
- † = Joined team via a transaction (e.g., trade, waivers, signing) during the season. Stats reflect time with the Lightning only.
- ‡ = Left team via a transaction (e.g., trade, waivers, release) during the season. Stats reflect time with the Lightning only.

No.	Player	Pos	Regular season					
No.	Player	Pos	GP	G	A	Pts	+/-	PIM
19	Brian Bradley	C	46	13	27	40	−6	42
77	Chris Gratton	C	46	7	20	27	−2	89
85	Petr Klima	LW	47	13	13	26	−13	26
14	John Tucker	C	46	12	13	25	−10	14
44	Roman Hamrlik	D	48	12	11	23	−18	86
15	Paul Ysebaert†	C	29	8	11	19	−1	12
18	Denis Savard‡	C	31	6	11	17	−6	10
29	Alex Selivanov	RW	43	10	6	16	−2	14
7	Rob Zamuner	LW	43	9	6	15	−3	24
28	Marc Bureau	C	48	2	12	14	−8	30
22	Shawn Chambers‡	D	24	2	12	14	0	6
34	Mikael Andersson	LW	36	4	7	11	−3	4
27	Alexander Semak†	C	22	5	5	10	−3	12
24	Danton Cole‡	LW	26	3	3	6	−1	6
25	Marc Bergevin	D	44	2	4	6	−6	51
39	Enrico Ciccone	D	41	2	4	6	3	225
4	Cory Cross	D	43	1	5	6	−6	41
3	Eric Charron	D	45	1	4	5	1	26
9	Jason Wiemer	C	36	1	4	5	−2	44
21	Bob Halkidis†	D	27	1	3	4	−12	40
6	Adrien Plavsic†	D	15	2	1	3	5	4
33 (Note: Myhres wore number 27 in his first game.)	Brantt Myhres	RW	15	2	0	2	−2	81
20	Rudy Poeschek	D	25	1	1	2	0	92
16 (Note: Hankinson wore number 23 in his first two games.)	Ben Hankinson†	RW	18	0	2	2	1	6
27	Jim Cummins‡	RW	10	1	0	1	−3	41
49	Brent Gretzky	C	3	0	1	1	−2	0
93	Daren Puppa	G	36	0	1	1		2
30	Jean-Claude Bergeron	G	17	0	0	0		2
17	Gerard Gallant	LW	1	0	0	0	0	0
26	Chris LiPuma	D	1	0	0	0	2	0
23	Rich Sutter†‡	RW	4	0	0	0	0	0

=== Goaltending ===
No.	Player	Regular season									
No.	Player	GP	W	L	T	SA	GA	GAA	SV%	SO	TOI
93	Daren Puppa	36	14	19	2	946	90	2.68	.905	1	2013
30	Jean-Claude Bergeron	17	3	9	1	374	49	3.33	.869	1	883

== Awards and records ==
=== Milestones ===
Milestone	Player	Date	Ref
First game	Alexander Selivanov	January 20, 1995	
First game	Jason Wiemer	January 22, 1995	
First game	Brantt Myhres	March 4, 1995	

== Draft picks ==
Tampa Bay's draft picks at the 1994 NHL entry draft in Hartford, Connecticut.

Round	Pick	Player	Nationality	College/junior/club team
1	8	Jason Wiemer (C)	Canada	Portland Winter Hawks (WHL)
2	34	Colin Cloutier (C)	Canada	Brandon Wheat Kings (WHL)
3	55	Vadim Epanchintsev (C)	Russia	Spartak Moscow (Russia)
4	86	Dmitri Klevakin (LW)	Russia	Spartak Moscow (Russia)
6	137	Dan Juden (C)	United States	Governor Dummer Academy (USHS-MA)
6	138	Bryce Salvador (D)	Canada	Lethbridge Hurricanes (WHL)
7	164	Chris Maillet (D)	Canada	Red Deer Rebels (WHL)
8	190	Alexei Baranov (D)	Russia	Dynamo Moscow (Russia)
9	216	Yuri Smirnov (C)	Russia	Spartak Moscow (Russia)
10	242	Shawn Gervais (C)	Canada	Seattle Thunderbirds (WHL)
11	268	Brian White (D)	United States	Arlington Catholic High School (USHS-MA)
S	8	Francois Bouchard (D)	Canada	Northeastern University (Hockey East)
