= 1994–95 New York Islanders season =

NHL hockey team season

1994–95 New York Islanders
- Division: 7th Atlantic
- Conference: 13th Eastern
- 1994–95 record: 15–28–5
- Home record: 10–11–3
- Road record: 5–17–2
- Goals for: 126
- Goals against: 158

Team information
- General manager: Don Maloney
- Coach: Lorne Henning
- Captain: Patrick Flatley
- Arena: Nassau Coliseum
- Average attendance: 12,573
- Minor league affiliates: Denver Grizzlies; Tallahassee Tiger Sharks

Team leaders
- Goals: Ray Ferraro (22)
- Assists: Ray Ferraro (21)
- Points: Ray Ferraro (43)
- Penalty minutes: Mick Vukota (109)
- Plus/minus: Dean Chynoweth (+9); Patrick Flatley (+9)
- Wins: Tommy Soderstrom (8)
- Goals against average: Tommy Soderstrom (3.11)

The 1994–95 New York Islanders season was the 23rd season in the franchise's history. The Islanders were unable to qualify for the playoffs, thus ending their two-season playoff streak.

== Offseason ==
Longtime head coach Al Arbour announced his retirement from coaching and was named the team's vice president of hockey operations on June 1. Assistant coach Lorne Henning was named his successor on June 20.

== Regular season ==
After starting the season with a 4–2–1 record, the Islanders fell into a slump from which they could not recover. They would win only 11 of their remaining 41 games, going 11–26–4. The Islanders would finish 12 points out of eighth place and miss the playoffs for the first time since 1992.

Near the end of the season, General Manager Don Maloney decided that the core of players he had left alone for three seasons should be totally revamped, and he undertook a rebuilding project. He traded Pierre Turgeon and Vladimir Malakhov to Montreal for Kirk Muller and Mathieu Schneider, and Benoit Hogue was sent to Toronto for young goaltender Eric Fichaud. Additionally, Maloney allowed the team's leading scorer, Ray Ferraro, to depart as an unrestricted free agent at the conclusion of the season. Fans' displeasure at the GM for trading the popular Turgeon was magnified when Muller balked at joining a rebuilding team. He only played 45 games for the Islanders before being sent to the Maple Leafs.

The Islanders finished the regular season having allowed the most short-handed goals in the NHL, with 11.

=== Season standings ===
Atlantic Division
No.	CR		GP	W	L	T	GF	GA	Pts
1	2	**Philadelphia Flyers**	48	28	16	4	150	132	60
2	5	**New Jersey Devils**	48	22	18	8	136	121	52
3	6	**Washington Capitals**	48	22	18	8	136	120	52
4	8	**New York Rangers**	48	22	23	3	139	134	47
5	9	Florida Panthers	48	20	22	6	115	127	46
6	12	Tampa Bay Lightning	48	17	28	3	120	144	37
7	13	New York Islanders	48	15	28	5	126	158	35

Note: No. = Division rank, CR = Conference rank, W = Wins, L = Losses, T = Ties, GF = Goals For, GA = Goals Against, Pts = Points
Teams that qualified for the playoffs are highlighted in bold.

Eastern Conference
R		Div	GP	W	L	T	GF	GA	Pts
**1**	**Quebec Nordiques**	**NE**	**48**	**30**	**13**	**5**	**185**	**134**	65
**2**	**Philadelphia Flyers**	**AT**	**48**	**28**	**16**	**4**	**150**	**132**	60
**3**	**Pittsburgh Penguins**	**NE**	**48**	**29**	**16**	**3**	**181**	**158**	61
**4**	**Boston Bruins**	**NE**	**48**	**27**	**18**	**3**	**150**	**127**	57
**5**	**New Jersey Devils**	**AT**	**48**	**22**	**18**	**8**	**136**	**121**	52
**6**	**Washington Capitals**	**AT**	**48**	**22**	**18**	**8**	**136**	**120**	52
**7**	**Buffalo Sabres**	**NE**	**48**	**22**	**19**	**7**	**130**	**119**	51
**8**	**New York Rangers**	**AT**	**48**	**22**	**23**	**3**	**139**	**134**	47
9	Florida Panthers	AT	48	20	22	6	115	127	46
10	Hartford Whalers	NE	48	19	24	5	127	141	43
11	Montreal Canadiens	NE	48	18	23	7	125	148	43
12	Tampa Bay Lightning	AT	48	17	28	3	120	144	37
13	New York Islanders	AT	48	15	28	5	126	158	35
14	Ottawa Senators	NE	48	9	34	5	117	174	23

Divisions: AT – Atlantic, NE – Northeast

bold – Qualified for playoffs

== Schedule and results ==
1994–95 regular season
January: 3–2–1 (home: 2–1–1; road: 1–1–0)

Game	Date	Score	Opponent	Record	Recap
1	January 21, 1995	2–1	Florida Panthers (1994–95)	1–0–0	W
2	January 22, 1995	3–3 OT	Ottawa Senators (1994–95)	1–0–1	T
3	January 24, 1995	4–3	Philadelphia Flyers (1994–95)	2–0–1	W
4	January 27, 1995	2–5	@ Washington Capitals (1994–95)	2–1–1	L
5	January 28, 1995	1–4	Tampa Bay Lightning (1994–95)	2–2–1	L
6	January 31, 1995	5–1	@ Florida Panthers (1994–95)	3–2–1	W

February: 5–6–2 (home: 4–3–0; road: 1–3–2)

Game	Date	Score	Opponent	Record	Recap
7	February 2, 1995	5–4 OT	@ Philadelphia Flyers (1994–95)	4–2–1	W
8	February 4, 1995	2–4	@ Montreal Canadiens (1994–95)	4–3–1	L
9	February 7, 1995	2–5	@ Tampa Bay Lightning (1994–95)	4–4–1	L
10	February 9, 1995	2–5	Pittsburgh Penguins (1994–95)	4–5–1	L
11	February 11, 1995	2–1	Buffalo Sabres (1994–95)	5–5–1	W
12	February 14, 1995	2–3	Quebec Nordiques (1994–95)	5–6–1	L
13	February 17, 1995	2–2 OT	@ New Jersey Devils (1994–95)	5–6–2	T
14	February 18, 1995	3–2	New Jersey Devils (1994–95)	6–6–2	W
15	February 20, 1995	2–3 OT	@ Montreal Canadiens (1994–95)	6–7–2	L
16	February 22, 1995	3–3 OT	@ Buffalo Sabres (1994–95)	6–7–3	T
17	February 23, 1995	1–4	Tampa Bay Lightning (1994–95)	6–8–3	L
18	February 25, 1995	3–1	Pittsburgh Penguins (1994–95)	7–8–3	W
19	February 28, 1995	2–1	Montreal Canadiens (1994–95)	8–8–3	W

March: 2–10–1 (home: 2–2–1; road: 0–8–0)

Game	Date	Score	Opponent	Record	Recap
20	March 2, 1995	3–4	Washington Capitals (1994–95)	8–9–3	L
21	March 5, 1995	1–3	@ Ottawa Senators (1994–95)	8–10–3	L
22	March 7, 1995	3–1	Hartford Whalers (1994–95)	9–10–3	W
23	March 9, 1995	2–4	@ Pittsburgh Penguins (1994–95)	9–11–3	L
24	March 11, 1995	1–2	@ Quebec Nordiques (1994–95)	9–12–3	L
25	March 14, 1995	4–6	@ Hartford Whalers (1994–95)	9–13–3	L
26	March 16, 1995	3–6	@ Buffalo Sabres (1994–95)	9–14–3	L
27	March 18, 1995	3–4	@ Boston Bruins (1994–95)	9–15–3	L
28	March 23, 1995	1–0	New York Rangers (1994–95)	10–15–3	W
29	March 25, 1995	1–5	@ Hartford Whalers (1994–95)	10–16–3	L
30	March 26, 1995	5–5 OT	New Jersey Devils (1994–95)	10–16–4	T
31	March 28, 1995	3–6	@ Pittsburgh Penguins (1994–95)	10–17–4	L
32	March 30, 1995	2–3	Boston Bruins (1994–95)	10–18–4	L

April: 5–9–1 (home: 2–4–1; road: 3–5–0)

Game	Date	Score	Opponent	Record	Recap
33	April 1, 1995	1–5	Buffalo Sabres (1994–95)	10–19–4	L
34	April 4, 1995	4–5	Washington Capitals (1994–95)	10–20–4	L
35	April 7, 1995	4–3	@ New York Rangers (1994–95)	11–20–4	W
36	April 8, 1995	2–2 OT	Florida Panthers (1994–95)	11–20–5	T
37	April 11, 1995	2–5	@ Tampa Bay Lightning (1994–95)	11–21–5	L
38	April 12, 1995	3–1	@ Florida Panthers (1994–95)	12–21–5	W
39	April 14, 1995	3–6	@ New Jersey Devils (1994–95)	12–22–5	L
40	April 16, 1995	2–3	New York Rangers (1994–95)	12–23–5	L
41	April 18, 1995	5–2	Quebec Nordiques (1994–95)	13–23–5	W
42	April 20, 1995	1–2	@ Philadelphia Flyers (1994–95)	13–24–5	L
43	April 22, 1995	2–3	Ottawa Senators (1994–95)	13–25–5	L
44	April 24, 1995	5–3	Boston Bruins (1994–95)	14–25–5	W
45	April 26, 1995	5–6	@ Washington Capitals (1994–95)	14–26–5	L
46	April 28, 1995	4–2	@ New York Rangers (1994–95)	15–26–5	W
47	April 29, 1995	3–4	@ Ottawa Senators (1994–95)	15–27–5	L

May: 0–1–0 (home: 0–1–0; road: 0–0–0)

Game	Date	Score	Opponent	Record	Recap
48	May 2, 1995	0–2	Philadelphia Flyers (1994–95)	15–28–5	L

Legend: W Win (2 points) L Loss (0 points) T Tie (1 point)

== Player statistics ==
=== Scoring ===
- Position abbreviations: C = Center; D = Defense; G = Goaltender; LW = Left wing; RW = Right wing
- † = Joined team via a transaction (e.g., trade, waivers, signing) during the season. Stats reflect time with the Islanders only.
- ‡ = Left team via a transaction (e.g., trade, waivers, release) during the season. Stats reflect time with the Islanders only.

No.	Player	Pos	Regular season					
No.	Player	Pos	GP	G	A	Pts	+/-	PIM
20	Ray Ferraro	C	47	22	21	43	1	30
77	Pierre Turgeon‡	C	34	13	14	27	−12	10
26	Patrick Flatley	RW	45	7	20	27	9	12
32	Steve Thomas	RW	47	11	15	26	−14	60
27	Derek King	LW	43	10	16	26	−5	41
68	Zigmund Palffy	LW	33	10	7	17	3	6
18	Marty McInnis	LW	41	9	7	16	−1	8
92 (Note: Malakhov wore number 23 in his first ten games.)	Vladimir Malakhov‡	D	26	3	13	16	−1	32
7	Scott Lachance	D	26	6	7	13	2	26
39	Travis Green	C	42	5	7	12	−10	25
37	Dennis Vaske	D	41	1	11	12	3	53
33	Benoit Hogue‡	LW	33	6	4	10	0	34
24	Troy Loney‡	LW	26	5	4	9	0	23
72	Mathieu Schneider†	D	13	3	6	9	−5	30
2	Bob Beers	D	22	2	7	9	−8	6
9	Kirk Muller†	C	12	3	5	8	3	14
15	Brad Dalgarno	RW	22	3	2	5	−8	14
17	Chris Marinucci	C	12	1	4	5	−1	2
14	Ron Sutter	C	27	1	4	5	−8	21
75	Brett Lindros	RW	33	1	3	4	−8	100
6	Chris Luongo	D	47	1	3	4	−2	36
24 (Note: Severyn wore number 4 in his first eight games.)	Brent Severyn†	D	19	1	3	4	1	34
25	Paul Stanton†	D	18	0	4	4	−6	9
28 (Note: Taylor wore number 25 in his first two games.)	Chris Taylor	C	10	0	3	3	1	2
34	Yan Kaminsky	LW	2	1	1	2	2	0
47	Rich Pilon	D	20	1	1	2	−3	40
3	Dean Chynoweth	D	32	0	2	2	9	77
12	Mick Vukota	RW	39	0	2	2	1	109
11	Darius Kasparaitis	D	13	0	1	1	−11	22
10	Kip Miller	C	8	0	1	1	1	0
35	Tommy Salo	G	6	0	1	1		0
9	Dave Chyzowski	LW	13	0	0	0	−2	11
10	Craig Darby†	C	3	0	0	0	−1	0
8	Gord Dineen	D	9	0	0	0	−5	2
29	Jamie McLennan	G	21	0	0	0		2
30	Tommy Soderstrom	G	26	0	0	0		2
34	Milan Tichy	D	2	0	0	0	−1	2
38	Andrei Vasilyev	LW	2	0	0	0	0	2
36	Jason Widmer	D	1	0	0	0	−1	0

=== Goaltending ===
No.	Player	Regular season									
No.	Player	GP	W	L	T	SA	GA	GAA	SV%	SO	TOI
30	Tommy Soderstrom	26	8	12	3	717	70	3.11	.902	1	1350
29	Jamie McLennan	21	6	11	2	539	67	3.39	.876	0	1185
35	Tommy Salo	6	1	5	0	189	18	3.02	.905	0	358

== Awards and records ==
=== Milestones ===
Milestone	Player	Date	Ref
First game	Brett Lindros	January 21, 1995	
First game	Chris Taylor	January 31, 1995	
First game	Chris Marinucci	March 30, 1995	
First game	Tommy Salo	April 11, 1995	
First game	Andrei Vasilyev	April 26, 1995	
First game	Jason Widmer	May 2, 1995	

== Draft picks ==
New York's draft picks at the 1994 NHL entry draft in Hartford, Connecticut.

Round	Pick	Player	Nationality	College/junior/club team
1	9	Brett Lindros (RW)	Canada	Kingston Frontenacs (OHL)
2	38	Jason Holland (D)	Canada	Kamloops Blazers (WHL)
3	63	Jason Strudwick (D)	Canada	Kamloops Blazers (WHL)
4	90	Brad Lukowich (D)	Canada	Kamloops Blazers (WHL)
5	112	Mark McArthur (G)	Canada	Guelph Storm (OHL)
5	116	Albie O'Connell (LW)	United States	Saint Sebastian's School (USHS-MA)
6	142	Jason Stewart (C)	United States	Simley High School (USHS-MA)
8	194	Mike Loach (C)	Canada	Windsor Spitfires (OHL)
8	203	Peter Hogardh (C)	Sweden	Västra Frölunda HC (Sweden)
9	220	Gord Walsh (LW)	Canada	Kingston Frontenacs (OHL)
10	246	Kirk DeWaele (D)	Canada	Lethbridge Hurricanes (WHL)
11	272	Dick Tarnstrom (D)	Sweden	AIK IF (Sweden)
