= 1994–95 Florida Panthers season =

Hockey season

1994–95 Florida Panthers
- Division: 5th Atlantic
- Conference: 9th Eastern
- 1994–95 record: 20–22–6
- Home record: 9–12–3
- Road record: 11–10–3
- Goals for: 115
- Goals against: 127

Team information
- General manager: Bryan Murray
- Coach: Roger Neilson
- Captain: Brian Skrudland
- Alternate captains: Scott Mellanby; Gord Murphy
- Arena: Miami Arena
- Average attendance: 14,192
- Minor league affiliates: Cincinnati Cyclones; Birmingham Bulls

Team leaders
- Goals: Jesse Belanger (15)
- Assists: Stu Barnes (19)
- Points: Jesse Belanger (29)
- Penalty minutes: Paul Laus (138)
- Plus/minus: Jesse Belanger (+7)
- Wins: John Vanbiesbrouck (14)
- Goals against average: John Vanbiesbrouck (2.47)

The 1994–95 Florida Panthers season was the Panthers' second season. For the second straight year, they missed the playoffs by just one point. While the team tied for 6th in the league in goaltending behind the solid tandem of John Vanbiesbrouck and Mark Fitzpatrick and finished first in most shutouts (6), it finished last in the league in scoring with 115 goals and was shut out 5 times. The Panthers tied the Montreal Canadiens and the Ottawa Senators for fewest shorthanded goals scored (1).

The Panthers were one of only three teams in 1994–95 to have a better regular-season record on the road then at home (the other two teams were the Chicago Blackhawks and the Los Angeles Kings).

== Offseason ==
General manager Bob Clarke left the team to return to the Philadelphia Flyers, being named president and general manager of the Flyers on June 15. Since Clarke had to be released from his existing contract, the Panthers received the Flyers' 1994 second-round pick and cash, believed to be around $500,000, as compensation. Bryan Murray was named the team's new general manager on August 1.

== Regular season ==
=== January ===
The Panthers began the lockout shortened 1994–95 season on January 21, 1995, losing on the road to the New York Islanders by a 2–1 score, as Zigmund Palffy scored two goals in just over a two-minute span in the middle of the third period. The Panthers lost their next two games, including their home opener to the Pittsburgh Penguins by a 6–5 score, and on the road to their state rivals, the Tampa Bay Lightning 3–2, before earning their first win, defeating the Lightning in the second game of a home and home series by a 4–2 score. Florida closed out the month with two wins in their last three games.

The team had a record of 3–4–0 in January, earning six points, which placed them in third place in the Atlantic Division, and seventh place in the Eastern Conference.

=== February ===
Florida began February rather slowly, as after a 1–1 tie against the Montreal Canadiens on February 2, the club lost their next two games to extend their overall winless streak to four games. The Panthers snapped out of their slump though, as John Vanbiesbrouck stopped all 26 shots that the Philadelphia Flyers fired at him, in a 3–0 victory on February 9. The club then had a seven-game homestand, beginning on February 11 with a solid 4–3 win over the Hartford Whalers, however, their two-game winning streak ended the following night, losing 4–2 to the New Jersey Devils. The Panthers shut out the Ottawa Senators 2–0 in their next game to return to the win column, however, the team lost their last four games on the home stand, going a disappointing 2–5–0 on it. Back on the road on February 25, the Panthers snapped their losing skid, defeating the Ottawa Senators 4–1, before ending the month with a 0–0 tie against the defending Stanley Cup champions, the New York Rangers.

At the end of February, the Panthers had an overall record of 7–11–2, earning 16 points, as the club struggled on home ice, posting a 3–7–1 record in their first 11 home games. Florida was in sixth place in the Atlantic Division, and 12th in the Eastern Conference.

=== March ===
Florida opened March with two road games, as they tied the Philadelphia Flyers 2–2 on March 2, followed by a 6–1 loss at the hands of the New Jersey Devils. On March 8, the club ended their three-game winless streak, defeating the Ottawa Senators 3–2, before heading out on the road again for two games, in which the Panthers shut out the Boston Bruins 2–0, followed by a 4–1 win over the Hartford Whalers to extend their winning streak to three games. The team returned home for a three-game home stand, where they remained hot, tying the Buffalo Sabres 1–1, soundly defeating the Washington Capitals 5–1 to extend their overall unbeaten streak to five games, before losing in overtime to the Philadelphia Flyers 4–3 on March 18. Florida then embarked on a three-game road trip, where they began with a 5–4 overtime loss to the Quebec Nordiques, before defeating the Montreal Canadiens 3–2 to get a much needed victory. The Panthers finished the trip with a 3–0 loss to the Buffalo Sabres, and were starting to fall out of the playoff race. Florida ended March with a brief two game home stand, in which they shut out the high scoring Pittsburgh Penguins 2–0, with John Vanbiesbrouck making 24 saves for the shut out, followed by a 4–4 tie against the Hartford Whalers.

The Panthers had an overall record of 13–16–4 at the end of March, earning 30 points, in which placed them fourth in the Atlantic Division, and ninth in the Eastern Conference, only one point behind the Hartford Whalers for the eighth and final playoff spot.

=== April/May ===
The Panthers began April with a solid 4–1 road victory over the Tampa Bay Lightning on April 2, which moved the club into eighth place, however, Florida found themselves out of a playoff spot after being blown out by the New York Rangers by a 5–0 score on home ice on April 5, as the club fell into tenth spot, behind the New York Rangers and Hartford Whalers by a single point for the last post-season spot. The Panthers continued to struggle over their next three games, going 0–2–1, falling five points behind the eighth place Buffalo Sabres. The club tried to claw their way back race, going 4–1–0 in their next five games, however, Florida still remained two points out of the playoffs. Florida finished April on a three-game winless streak, posting a 0–2–1 record, which eliminated the club from post-season contention. The team finished the season with two wins, defeating the New York Rangers and Pittsburgh Penguins on the road.

The club finished the 1994–95 season with a 20–22–6 record, earning 46 points, which placed them fifth in the Atlantic Division, and ninth in the Eastern Conference, just one point behind the New York Rangers for the final playoff spot.

=== Final standings ===
Atlantic Division
No.	CR		GP	W	L	T	GF	GA	Pts
1	2	**Philadelphia Flyers**	48	28	16	4	150	132	60
2	5	**New Jersey Devils**	48	22	18	8	136	121	52
3	6	**Washington Capitals**	48	22	18	8	136	120	52
4	8	**New York Rangers**	48	22	23	3	139	134	47
5	9	Florida Panthers	48	20	22	6	115	127	46
6	12	Tampa Bay Lightning	48	17	28	3	120	144	37
7	13	New York Islanders	48	15	28	5	126	158	35

Note: No. = Division rank, CR = Conference rank, W = Wins, L = Losses, T = Ties, GF = Goals For, GA = Goals Against, Pts = Points
Teams that qualified for the playoffs are highlighted in bold.

Eastern Conference
R		Div	GP	W	L	T	GF	GA	Pts
**1**	**Quebec Nordiques**	**NE**	**48**	**30**	**13**	**5**	**185**	**134**	65
**2**	**Philadelphia Flyers**	**AT**	**48**	**28**	**16**	**4**	**150**	**132**	60
**3**	**Pittsburgh Penguins**	**NE**	**48**	**29**	**16**	**3**	**181**	**158**	61
**4**	**Boston Bruins**	**NE**	**48**	**27**	**18**	**3**	**150**	**127**	57
**5**	**New Jersey Devils**	**AT**	**48**	**22**	**18**	**8**	**136**	**121**	52
**6**	**Washington Capitals**	**AT**	**48**	**22**	**18**	**8**	**136**	**120**	52
**7**	**Buffalo Sabres**	**NE**	**48**	**22**	**19**	**7**	**130**	**119**	51
**8**	**New York Rangers**	**AT**	**48**	**22**	**23**	**3**	**139**	**134**	47
9	Florida Panthers	AT	48	20	22	6	115	127	46
10	Hartford Whalers	NE	48	19	24	5	127	141	43
11	Montreal Canadiens	NE	48	18	23	7	125	148	43
12	Tampa Bay Lightning	AT	48	17	28	3	120	144	37
13	New York Islanders	AT	48	15	28	5	126	158	35
14	Ottawa Senators	NE	48	9	34	5	117	174	23

Divisions: AT – Atlantic, NE – Northeast

bold – Qualified for playoffs

== Schedule and results ==
1994–95 regular season
January: 3–4–0 (home: 1–2–0; road: 2–2–0)

Game	Date	Score	Opponent	Record	Recap
1	January 21, 1995	1–2	@ New York Islanders (1994–95)	0–1–0	L
2	January 23, 1995	5–6	Pittsburgh Penguins (1994–95)	0–2–0	L
3	January 25, 1995	2–3	@ Tampa Bay Lightning (1994–95)	0–3–0	L
4	January 26, 1995	4–2	Tampa Bay Lightning (1994–95)	1–3–0	W
5	January 28, 1995	2–1	@ Hartford Whalers (1994–95)	2–3–0	W
6	January 30, 1995	2–1	@ Boston Bruins (1994–95)	3–3–0	W
7	January 31, 1995	1–5	New York Islanders (1994–95)	3–4–0	L

February: 4–7–2 (home: 2–5–1; road: 2–2–1)

Game	Date	Score	Opponent	Record	Recap
8	February 2, 1995	1–1 OT	Montreal Canadiens (1994–95)	3–4–1	T
9	February 4, 1995	2–3	@ Washington Capitals (1994–95)	3–5–1	L
10	February 7, 1995	3–7	@ Pittsburgh Penguins (1994–95)	3–6–1	L
11	February 9, 1995	3–0	@ Philadelphia Flyers (1994–95)	4–6–1	W
12	February 11, 1995	4–3	Hartford Whalers (1994–95)	5–6–1	W
13	February 12, 1995	2–4	New Jersey Devils (1994–95)	5–7–1	L
14	February 15, 1995	2–0	Ottawa Senators (1994–95)	6–7–1	W
15	February 17, 1995	4–5	Boston Bruins (1994–95)	6–8–1	L
16	February 19, 1995	1–4	Quebec Nordiques (1994–95)	6–9–1	L
17	February 21, 1995	3–5	New York Rangers (1994–95)	6–10–1	L
18	February 23, 1995	2–5	Montreal Canadiens (1994–95)	6–11–1	L
19	February 25, 1995	4–1	@ Ottawa Senators (1994–95)	7–11–1	W
20	February 28, 1995	0–0 OT	@ New York Rangers (1994–95)	7–11–2	T

March: 6–5–2 (home: 3–2–1; road: 3–3–1)

Game	Date	Score	Opponent	Record	Recap
21	March 2, 1995	2–2 OT	@ Philadelphia Flyers (1994–95)	7–11–3	T
22	March 4, 1995	1–6	@ New Jersey Devils (1994–95)	7–12–3	L
23	March 8, 1995	3–2	Ottawa Senators (1994–95)	8–12–3	W
24	March 11, 1995	2–0	@ Boston Bruins (1994–95)	9–12–3	W
25	March 12, 1995	4–1	@ Hartford Whalers (1994–95)	10–12–3	W
26	March 14, 1995	1–2 OT	Buffalo Sabres (1994–95)	10–13–3	L
27	March 16, 1995	5–1	Washington Capitals (1994–95)	11–13–3	W
28	March 18, 1995	3–4 OT	Philadelphia Flyers (1994–95)	11–14–3	L
29	March 20, 1995	4–5 OT	@ Quebec Nordiques (1994–95)	11–15–3	L
30	March 22, 1995	3–2	@ Montreal Canadiens (1994–95)	12–15–3	W
31	March 24, 1995	0–3	@ Buffalo Sabres (1994–95)	12–16–3	L
32	March 26, 1995	2–0	Pittsburgh Penguins (1994–95)	13–16–3	W
33	March 29, 1995	4–4 OT	Hartford Whalers (1994–95)	13–16–4	T

April: 5–6–2 (home: 3–3–1; road: 2–3–1)

Game	Date	Score	Opponent	Record	Recap
34	April 2, 1995	4–1	@ Tampa Bay Lightning (1994–95)	14–16–4	W
35	April 5, 1995	0–5	New York Rangers (1994–95)	14–17–4	L
36	April 8, 1995	2–2 OT	@ New York Islanders (1994–95)	14–17–5	T
37	April 12, 1995	1–3	New York Islanders (1994–95)	14–18–5	L
38	April 14, 1995	0–3	@ Washington Capitals (1994–95)	14–19–5	L
39	April 16, 1995	4–1	Tampa Bay Lightning (1994–95)	15–19–5	W
40	April 18, 1995	1–3	Philadelphia Flyers (1994–95)	15–20–5	L
41	April 20, 1995	1–0	New Jersey Devils (1994–95)	16–20–5	W
42	April 22, 1995	4–2	Quebec Nordiques (1994–95)	17–20–5	W
43	April 24, 1995	5–1	@ Ottawa Senators (1994–95)	18–20–5	W
44	April 26, 1995	0–5	@ Buffalo Sabres (1994–95)	18–21–5	L
45	April 28, 1995	1–3	@ New Jersey Devils (1994–95)	18–22–5	L
46	April 30, 1995	2–2 OT	Washington Capitals (1994–95)	18–22–6	T

May: 2–0–0 (home: 0–0–0; road: 2–0–0)

Game	Date	Score	Opponent	Record	Recap
47	May 2, 1995	4–3	@ New York Rangers (1994–95)	19–22–6	W
48	May 3, 1995	4–3	@ Pittsburgh Penguins (1994–95)	20–22–6	W

Legend: W Win (2 points) L Loss (0 points) T Tie (1 point)

== Player statistics ==
=== Scoring ===
- Position abbreviations: C = Center; D = Defense; G = Goaltender; LW = Left wing; RW = Right wing
- † = Joined team via a transaction (e.g., trade, waivers, signing) during the season. Stats reflect time with the Panthers only.
- ‡ = Left team via a transaction (e.g., trade, waivers, release) during the season. Stats reflect time with the Panthers only.

No.	Player	Pos	Regular season					
No.	Player	Pos	GP	G	A	Pts	+/-	PIM
26	Jesse Belanger	C	47	15	14	29	−5	18
14	Stu Barnes	C	41	10	19	29	7	8
27	Scott Mellanby	RW	48	13	12	25	−16	90
5	Gord Murphy	D	46	6	16	22	−14	24
10	Dave Lowry	LW	45	10	10	20	−3	25
12	Jody Hull	RW	46	11	8	19	−1	8
11	Bill Lindsay	LW	48	10	9	19	1	46
21	Tom Fitzgerald	RW	48	3	13	16	−3	31
20	Brian Skrudland	C	47	5	9	14	0	88
18	Mike Hough	LW	48	6	7	13	1	38
6	Jason Woolley†	D	34	4	9	13	−1	18
29	Johan Garpenlov†	RW	27	3	9	12	4	0
44	Rob Niedermayer	C	48	4	6	10	−13	36
22	Bob Kudelski	RW	26	6	3	9	2	2
7	Brian Benning	D	24	1	7	8	−6	18
28	Magnus Svensson	D	19	2	5	7	5	10
19	Andrei Lomakin	LW	31	1	6	7	−5	6
3	Paul Laus	D	37	0	7	7	12	138
25	Geoff Smith	D	47	2	4	6	−5	22
15	Gaetan Duchesne†	LW	13	1	2	3	3	2
16	Randy Moller	D	17	0	3	3	−5	16
24	Brent Severyn‡	D	9	1	1	2	−3	37
24	Robert Svehla	D	5	1	1	2	3	0
2	Joe Cirella	D	20	0	1	1	−7	21
8	Dallas Eakins	D	17	0	1	1	2	35
34	John Vanbiesbrouck	G	37	0	1	1		6
4	Keith Brown	D	13	0	0	0	1	2
23	Jeff Daniels	LW	3	0	0	0	0	0
30	Mark Fitzpatrick	G	15	0	0	0		0
42	Jamie Linden	RW	4	0	0	0	−1	17
38	Stephane Richer	D	1	0	0	0	0	2
17	Dave Tomlinson	C	5	0	0	0	−2	0

=== Goaltending ===
No.	Player	Regular season									
No.	Player	GP	W	L	T	SA	GA	GAA	SV%	SO	TOI
34	John Vanbiesbrouck	37	14	15	4	1000	86	2.47	.914	4	2087
30	Mark Fitzpatrick	15	6	7	2	361	36	2.64	.900	2	819

== Awards and records ==
=== Milestones ===
Milestone	Player	Date	Ref
First game	Jamie Linden	February 9, 1995	
First game	Magnus Svensson	March 20, 1995	
First game	Robert Svehla	April 20, 1995	

== Draft picks ==
Florida's draft picks at the 1994 NHL entry draft.

Round	Pick	Player	Nationality	College/junior/club team
1	1	Ed Jovanovski (D)	Canada	Windsor Spitfires (OHL)
2	27	Rhett Warrener (D)	Canada	Saskatoon Blades (WHL)
2	31	Jason Podollan (RW)	Canada	Spokane Chiefs (WHL)
2	36	Ryan Johnson (C)	Canada	Thunder Bay Flyers (USHL)
4	84	David Nemirovsky (RW)	Canada	Ottawa 67's (OHL)
5	105	David Geris (D)	Canada	Windsor Spitfires (OHL)
7	157	Matt O'Dette (RW)	Canada	Kitchener Rangers (OHL)
8	183	Jason Boudrias (C)	Canada	Laval Titan (QMJHL)
10	235	Tero Lehtera (LW)	Finland	Kiekko-Espoo (Finland)
11	261	Per Gustafsson (D)	Sweden	HV71 (Sweden)
S	1	Sean McCann (D)	Canada	Harvard University (ECAC)
