= List of Buffalo Sabres seasons =

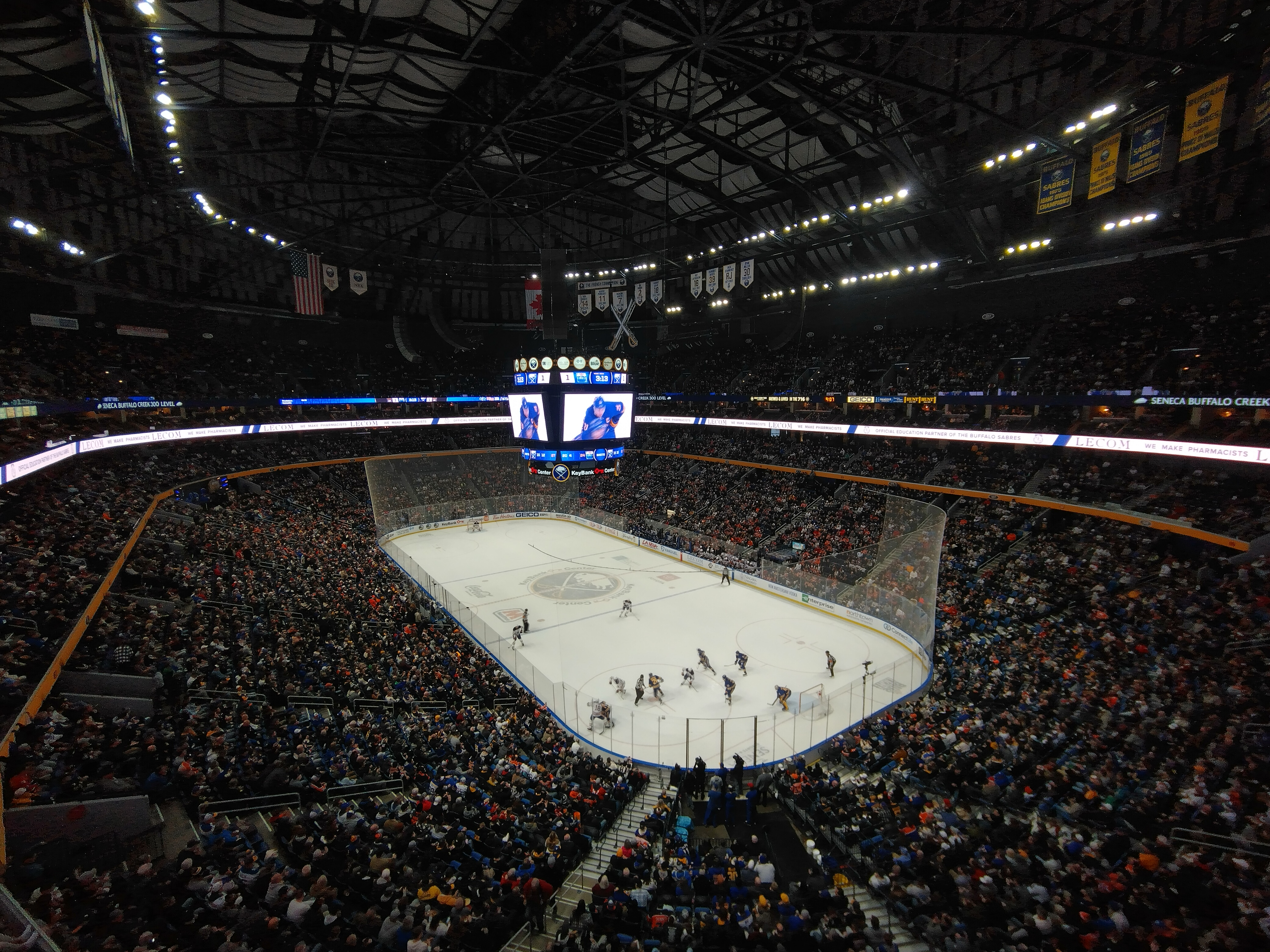
The interior of KeyBank Center during a Sabres home game in 2023

The Buffalo Sabres are a professional ice hockey team based in Buffalo, New York. They are members of the Atlantic Division in the Eastern Conference of the National Hockey League (NHL). Founded on May 22, 1970, as an expansion franchise, the Sabres played their homes games at the Buffalo Memorial Auditorium from their inaugural season to 1996, and since 1996 have played in the KeyBank Center. The 2025–26 NHL season marked the 56th year of operation for the franchise. As of the end of the 2025–26 season, the Sabres have won 2,004 regular season games, tying for the league lead in points once for the Presidents' Trophy. They have appeared in the playoffs 30 times, accumulating seven division championships and three conference championships, while reaching the Stanley Cup Final twice, losing both times.

The Sabres started play in the 1970–71 season, and made their first Stanley Cup appearance in 1975, losing the series in six games against the Philadelphia Flyers. Over the next 10 seasons, the Sabres made a postseason appearance every year, advancing as far as the semifinals in the 1979–80 season, where they lost the series to the New York Islanders in five games. During the ten-year postseason appearance streak, the Sabres won the Prince of Wales Conference twice and the Adams Division two times. The 1985–86 season marked the first time the Sabres failed to qualify for the playoffs since the 1973–74 season, missing the point cutoff by four points. The Sabres returned two years later in the 1987–88 season, beginning an eight-year postseason appearance streak. During this period, the Sabres only made it past the first round once in the 1992–93 season, where they were subsequently eliminated by the Montreal Canadiens in a sweep. The Sabres missed the playoffs in 1996, finishing 11th in the Eastern Conference with 73 points, 15 points behind the last team that qualified in the Eastern Conference, the Tampa Bay Lightning. The Sabres returned to the postseason the following year, starting their most successful postseason appearance streak, lasting for five years. Compared to the previous streak, the Sabres managed to advance past the first round in every season with the exception of the 1999–2000 season. The 1999 playoff run is the most recent appearance in the Stanley Cup Final for the Sabres as of the 2024–25 season. The Sabres had won the conference by beating the Ottawa Senators, the Boston Bruins, and the Maple Leafs. The Sabres faced the Dallas Stars in the 1999 Stanley Cup Final, a series that they lost in six, albeit in controversial fashion. The series ended with a triple-overtime goal in game six where replays showed that Stars forward Brett Hull scored with his skate in the crease. Despite the Sabres protesting the goal, the league stated that the goal had been reviewed and was judged as a good goal.

Following the 2000–01 season, the Sabres went on a three-year postseason appearance drought. After returning from the 2004–05 lockout, the Sabres returned to the postseason, making it to the conference finals against the Carolina Hurricanes, which was lost in seven games. The 2006–07 season saw the Sabres put on their best performance in franchise history, with a franchise-high 53 wins to win the division and the Presidents' Trophy at 113 points. They advanced to the conference finals for the second year in a row, where they lost to the Senators in five. The Sabres would not make the playoffs for another two seasons. The Sabres won the Northeast Division in the 2009–10 season and moved on to the playoffs, being eliminated in the first round by the Bruins in six games. The same fate happened the following year when they made the playoffs and got eliminated in the first round, this time by the Philadelphia Flyers in seven games. From the 2010–11 to the 2025–26 season, the Sabres did not make a playoff appearance, setting the all-time record for longest postseason appearance drought in NHL history at 14 seasons. The Sabres also did not win a single postseason series from the 2006–07 to the 2025–26 season, tying for fifth in all-time postseason series win droughts at 19 seasons. The playoff drought was accredited to multiple reasons, including failures of rebuilds, a lack of depth in rosters, and injuries to key players over multiple seasons.

== Table keys ==
Key of colors and symbols
Color/symbol	Explanation
†	Stanley Cup champions
‡	Conference champions
↑	Division champions
#	Led league in points

Key of terms and abbreviations
Term or abbreviation	Definition
Finish	Final position in division or league standings
GP	Number of games played
W	Number of wins
L	Number of losses
T	Number of ties (ending after the 2004–05 season)
OT	Number of losses in overtime (since the 1999–2000 season)
Pts	Number of points
GF	Goals for (goals scored by the Sabres)
GA	Goals against (goals scored by the Sabres' opponents)
—	Does not apply

== Year by year ==
Full list of Buffalo Sabres seasons
NHL season	Sabres season	Conference	Division	Regular season									Postseason					
NHL season	Sabres season	Conference	Division	Finish	GP	W	L	T	OT	Pts	GF	GA	GP	W	L	GF	GA	Playoffs Result
1970–71	1970–71	—	East	5th	78	24	39	15	—	63	217	291	—	—	—	—	—	Did not qualify
1971–72	1971–72	—	East	6th	78	16	43	19	—	51	203	289	—	—	—	—	—	Did not qualify
1972–73	1972–73	—	East	4th	78	37	27	14	—	88	257	219	6	2	4	16	21	Lost quarterfinals to Montreal Canadiens, 2–4
1973–74	1973–74	—	East	5th	78	32	34	12	—	76	242	250	—	—	—	—	—	Did not qualify
1974–75	1974–75	Wales‡ (Note: The NHL realigned prior to the 1974–75 season. The Sabres were placed in the Prince of Wales Conference's Adams Division.)	Adams↑	1st	80	49	16	15	—	113	354	240	17	10	7	53	58	Won quarterfinals vs. Chicago Blackhawks, 4–1; Won semifinals vs. Montreal Canadiens, 4–2; Lost Stanley Cup Final to Philadelphia Flyers, 2–4
1975–76	1975–76	Wales	Adams	2nd	80	46	21	13	—	105	339	240	9	4	5	25	29	Won preliminary round vs. St. Louis Blues, 2–1; Lost quarterfinals to New York Islanders, 2–4
1976–77	1976–77	Wales	Adams	2nd	80	48	24	8	—	104	301	220	6	2	4	21	19	Won preliminary round vs. Minnesota North Stars, 2–0; Lost quarterfinals to New York Islanders, 0–4
1977–78	1977–78	Wales	Adams	2nd	80	44	19	17	—	105	288	215	8	3	5	22	22	Won preliminary round vs. New York Rangers, 2–1; Lost quarterfinals to Philadelphia Flyers, 1–4
1978–79	1978–79	Wales	Adams	2nd	80	36	28	16	—	88	280	263	3	1	2	9	9	Lost preliminary round to Pittsburgh Penguins, 1–2
1979–80	1979–80	Wales‡	Adams↑	1st	80	47	17	16	—	110	318	201	14	9	5	48	36	Won preliminary round vs. Vancouver Canucks, 3–1; Won quarterfinals vs. Chicago Blackhawks, 4–0; Lost semifinals to New York Islanders, 1–4
1980–81	1980–81	Wales	Adams↑	1st	80	39	20	21	—	99	327	250	8	4	4	30	30	Won preliminary round vs. Vancouver Canucks, 3–0; Lost quarterfinals to Minnesota North Stars, 1–4
1981–82	1981–82	Wales	Adams	3rd	80	39	26	15	—	93	307	273	4	1	3	11	17	Lost division semifinals to Boston Bruins, 1–3
1982–83	1982–83	Wales	Adams	3rd	80	38	29	13	—	89	318	285	10	6	4	31	35	Won division semifinals vs. Montreal Canadiens, 3–0; Lost division finals to Boston Bruins, 3–4
1983–84	1983–84	Wales	Adams	2nd	80	48	25	7	—	103	315	257	3	0	3	5	13	Lost division semifinals to Quebec Nordiques, 0–3
1984–85	1984–85	Wales	Adams	3rd	80	38	28	14	—	90	290	237	5	2	3	22	22	Lost division semifinals to Quebec Nordiques, 2–3
1985–86	1985–86	Wales	Adams	5th	80	37	37	6	—	80	296	291	—	—	—	—	—	Did not qualify
1986–87	1986–87	Wales	Adams	5th	80	28	44	8	—	64	280	308	—	—	—	—	—	Did not qualify
1987–88	1987–88	Wales	Adams	3rd	80	37	32	11	—	85	283	305	6	2	4	22	28	Lost division semifinals to Boston Bruins, 2–4
1988–89	1988–89	Wales	Adams	3rd	80	38	35	7	—	83	291	299	5	1	4	14	16	Lost division semifinals to Boston Bruins, 1–4
1989–90	1989–90	Wales	Adams	2nd	80	45	27	8	—	98	286	248	6	2	4	13	17	Lost division semifinals to Montreal Canadiens, 2–4
1990–91	1990–91	Wales	Adams	3rd	80	31	30	19	—	81	292	278	6	2	4	24	29	Lost division semifinals to Montreal Canadiens, 2–4
1991–92	1991–92	Wales	Adams	3rd	80	31	37	12	—	74	289	299	7	3	4	24	19	Lost division semifinals to Boston Bruins, 3–4
1992–93	1992–93	Wales	Adams	4th	84	38	36	10	—	86	335	297	8	4	4	31	28	Won division semifinals vs. Boston Bruins, 4–0; Lost division finals to Montreal Canadiens, 0–4
1993–94	1993–94	Eastern (Note: The NHL realigned into Eastern and Western conferences prior to the 1993–94 season. Buffalo was placed in the Northeast Division of the Eastern Conference.)	Northeast	4th	84	43	32	9	—	95	282	218	7	3	4	14	14	Lost conference quarterfinals to New Jersey Devils, 3–4
1994–95 (Note: The season was shortened to 48 games because of the 1994–95 NHL lockout.)	1994–95	Eastern	Northeast	4th	48	22	19	7	—	51	130	119	5	1	4	13	18	Lost conference quarterfinals to Philadelphia Flyers, 1–4
1995–96	1995–96	Eastern	Northeast	5th	82	33	42	7	—	73	247	262	—	—	—	—	—	Did not qualify
1996–97	1996–97	Eastern	Northeast↑	1st	82	40	30	12	—	92	237	208	12	5	7	27	34	Won conference quarterfinals vs. Ottawa Senators, 4–3; Lost conference semifinals to Philadelphia Flyers, 1–4
1997–98	1997–98	Eastern	Northeast	3rd	82	36	29	17	—	89	211	187	15	10	5	46	32	Won conference quarterfinals vs. Philadelphia Flyers, 4–1; Won conference semifinals vs. Montreal Canadiens, 4–0; Lost conference finals to Washington Capitals, 2–4
1998–99	1998–99	Eastern‡	Northeast	4th	82	37	28	17	—	91	207	175	21	14	7	59	49	Won conference quarterfinals vs. Ottawa Senators, 4–0; Won conference semifinals vs. Boston Bruins, 4–2; Won conference finals vs. Toronto Maple Leafs, 4–1; Lost Stanley Cup Final to Dallas Stars, 2–4
1999–2000	1999–2000	Eastern	Northeast	3rd	82	35	32	11	4 (Note: Beginning with the 1999–2000 season, teams received one point for losing a regular season game in overtime.)	85	213	204	5	1	4	8	14	Lost conference quarterfinals to Philadelphia Flyers, 1–4
2000–01	2000–01	Eastern	Northeast	2nd	82	46	30	5	1	98	218	184	13	7	6	38	30	Won conference quarterfinals vs. Philadelphia Flyers, 4–2; Lost conference semifinals to Pittsburgh Penguins, 3–4
2001–02	2001–02	Eastern	Northeast	5th	82	35	35	11	1	82	213	200	—	—	—	—	—	Did not qualify
2002–03	2002–03	Eastern	Northeast	5th	82	27	37	10	8	72	190	219	—	—	—	—	—	Did not qualify
2003–04	2003–04	Eastern	Northeast	5th	82	37	34	7	4	85	220	221	—	—	—	—	—	Did not qualify
2004–05 (Note: The season was cancelled because of the 2004–05 NHL lockout.)	2004–05	Season cancelled due to 2004–05 NHL lockout																
2005–06	2005–06	Eastern	Northeast	2nd	82	52	24	— (Note: Prior to the 2005–06 season, the NHL instituted a penalty shootout for regular season games that remained tied after a five-minute overtime period, which prevented ties.)	6	110	276	234	18	11	7	60	49	Won conference quarterfinals vs. Philadelphia Flyers, 4–2; Won conference semifinals vs. Ottawa Senators, 4–1; Lost conference finals to Carolina Hurricanes, 3–4
2006–07	2006–07	Eastern	Northeast↑	1st	82	53	22	—	7	113#	298	238	16	9	7	44	39	Won conference quarterfinals vs. New York Islanders, 4–1; Won conference semifinals vs. New York Rangers, 4–2; Lost conference finals to Ottawa Senators, 1–4
2007–08	2007–08	Eastern	Northeast	4th	82	39	31	—	12	90	251	233	—	—	—	—	—	Did not qualify
2008–09	2008–09	Eastern	Northeast	3rd	82	41	32	—	9	91	242	229	—	—	—	—	—	Did not qualify
2009–10	2009–10	Eastern	Northeast↑	1st	82	45	27	—	10	100	231	201	6	2	4	15	16	Lost conference quarterfinals to Boston Bruins, 2–4
2010–11	2010–11	Eastern	Northeast	3rd	82	43	29	—	10	96	240	228	7	3	4	18	22	Lost conference quarterfinals to Philadelphia Flyers, 3–4
2011–12	2011–12	Eastern	Northeast	3rd	82	39	32	—	11	89	211	223	—	—	—	—	—	Did not qualify
2012–13 (Note: The season was shortened to 48 games because of the 2012–13 NHL lockout.)	2012–13	Eastern	Northeast	5th	48	21	21	—	6	48	118	139	—	—	—	—	—	Did not qualify
2013–14	2013–14	Eastern	Atlantic (Note: The NHL realigned prior to the 2013–14 season. The Sabres were placed in the Atlantic Division of the Eastern Conference.)	8th	82	21	51	—	10	52	150	243	—	—	—	—	—	Did not qualify
2014–15	2014–15	Eastern	Atlantic	8th	82	23	51	—	8	54	153	269	—	—	—	—	—	Did not qualify
2015–16	2015–16	Eastern	Atlantic	7th	82	35	36	—	11	81	199	215	—	—	—	—	—	Did not qualify
2016–17	2016–17	Eastern	Atlantic	8th	82	33	37	—	12	78	199	231	—	—	—	—	—	Did not qualify
2017–18	2017–18	Eastern	Atlantic	8th	82	25	45	—	12	62	198	278	—	—	—	—	—	Did not qualify
2018–19	2018–19	Eastern	Atlantic	6th	82	33	39	—	10	76	221	268	—	—	—	—	—	Did not qualify
2019–20 (Note: The regular season was suspended on March 12, 2020, due to the COVID-19 pandemic, and officially concluded on May 26, 2020, with the announcement of a 24-team expanded playoff to be held in the summer. The Sabres played 69 of their scheduled 82 games, and with a .493 win percentage in a strong Eastern Conference, were disqualified from the 2020 playoffs qualifying round.)	2019–20	Eastern	Atlantic	6th	69	30	31	—	8	68	193	215	—	—	—	—	—	Did not qualify
2020–21 (Note: Due to the COVID-19 pandemic, the 2020–21 NHL season was shortened to 56 games.)	2020–21	—	East	8th	56	15	34	—	7	37	134	196	—	—	—	—	—	Did not qualify
2021–22	2021–22	Eastern	Atlantic	5th	82	32	39	—	11	75	229	287	—	—	—	—	—	Did not qualify
2022–23	2022–23	Eastern	Atlantic	5th	82	42	33	—	7	91	293	297	—	—	—	—	—	Did not qualify
2023–24	2023–24	Eastern	Atlantic	6th	82	39	37	—	6	84	244	243	—	—	—	—	—	Did not qualify
2024–25	2024–25	Eastern	Atlantic	7th	82	36	39	—	7	79	265	287	—	—	—	—	—	Did not qualify
2025–26	2025–26	Eastern	Atlantic↑	1st	82	50	23	—	9	109	283	240	13	7	6	43	39	Won first round vs. Boston Bruins, 4–2; Lost second round to Montreal Canadiens, 3–4
Totals (Note: Totals as of the completion of the 2025–26 season.)					4,355	2,004	1,735	409	207	4,624	13,802	13,330	269	131	138	806	804	30 playoff appearances
