= List of New York Islanders seasons =

Banners representing the Islanders' four Stanley Cup victories.

The New York Islanders are a professional ice hockey team based in Elmont, New York. They compete in the National Hockey League (NHL) Eastern Conference's Metropolitan Division. Since their inaugural season in 1972, the team has played home games at Nassau Veterans Memorial Coliseum (1972–2015, 2018–2021), Barclays Center (2015–2020) and currently play at UBS Arena (since 2021). In forty-nine completed seasons, the team has won the Stanley Cup championship four times and has qualified for the playoffs twenty-seven times. They have played more than 310 playoff games, winning 172. As of the end of the 2021–22 season, New York has won more than 1,700 regular season games, the 15th-highest victory total among NHL teams.

The Islanders were founded in 1972 during the 1972–73 season, and won their first of four consecutive Stanley Cup championships in 1980. The team has since lost the conference finals in 1993 to eventual Stanley Cup champions Montreal Canadiens. The Islanders did not qualify for the playoffs from 1995 to 2001, but appeared in three straight postseasons from 2002 to 2004. The Islanders have never won the Presidents' Trophy, although they led the NHL in regular-season points in three seasons before the league began awarding the trophy; they won the Stanley Cup in two out of the three seasons. They last reached the Stanley Cup Final in 1984, their fifth consecutive appearance and first Finals loss. As of 2022, the Islanders are the last North American team to win four consecutive league championships.

In the lockout-shortened 2012–13 season, the Islanders returned to the playoffs for the first time since 2007, and just the second time since the 2004–05 NHL Lockout. After defeating the Pittsburgh Penguins in the Patrick Division final in 1993 the Islanders did not win another playoff series until 2016. The Islanders advanced to the second round in the playoffs from 2019 to 2021 and advanced to the third round in both the 2019–20 and 2020–21 postseasons, marking the first time since 1984 they’d advanced to the third round in consecutive years. The Islanders lost to the eventual Stanley Cup champion Tampa Bay Lightning in both trips to the third round.

== Table key ==
Key of colors and symbols
Color/symbol	Explanation
†	Stanley Cup champions
‡	Conference champions
↑	Division champions
#	Led league in points

Key of terms and abbreviations
Term or abbreviation	Definition
Finish	Final position in division or league standings
GP	Number of games played
W	Number of wins
L	Number of losses
T	Number of ties
OT	Number of losses in overtime (since the 1999–2000 season)
Pts	Number of points
GF	Goals for (goals scored by the Islanders)
GA	Goals against (goals scored by the Islanders' opponents)
—	Does not apply

== Year by year ==
NHL season	Islanders season	Conference	Division	Regular season									Postseason					
NHL season	Islanders season	Conference	Division	Finish	GP	W	L	T	OT	Pts	GF	GA	GP	W	L	GF	GA	Result
1972–73	1972–73	—	East	8th	78	12	60	6	—	30	170	347	—	—	—	—	—	Did not qualify
1973–74	1973–74	—	East	8th	78	19	41	18	—	56	182	247	—	—	—	—	—	Did not qualify
1974–75	1974–75	Campbell^{[a]}	Patrick	3rd	80	33	25	22	—	88	264	221	17	9	8	47	50	Won in preliminary round vs. New York Rangers, 2–1; Won in quarterfinals vs. Pittsburgh Penguins, 4–3; Lost in semifinals vs. Philadelphia Flyers, 3–4
1975–76	1975–76	Campbell	Patrick	2nd	80	42	21	17	—	101	297	190	13	7	6	43	41	Won in preliminary round vs. Vancouver Canucks, 2–0; Won in quarterfinals vs. Buffalo Sabres, 4–2; Lost in semifinals vs. Montreal Canadiens, 1–4
1976–77	1976–77	Campbell	Patrick	2nd	80	47	21	12	—	106	288	193	12	8	4	36	32	Won in preliminary round vs. Chicago Black Hawks, 2–0; Won in quarterfinals vs. Buffalo Sabres, 4–0; Lost in semifinals vs. Montreal Canadiens, 2–4
1977–78	1977–78	Campbell ‡	Patrick ↑	1st	80	48	17	15	—	111	334	210	7	3	4	13	16	Lost in quarterfinals vs. Toronto Maple Leafs, 3–4
1978–79	1978–79	Campbell ‡	Patrick ↑	1st	80	51	15	14	—	116 #	358	214	10	6	4	27	21	Won in quarterfinals vs. Chicago Black Hawks, 4–0; Lost in semifinals vs. New York Rangers, 2–4
1979–80 †	1979–80 †	Campbell	Patrick	2nd	80	39	28	13	—	91	281	247	21	15	6	88	66	Won in preliminary round vs. Los Angeles Kings, 3–1; Won in quarterfinals vs. Boston Bruins, 4–1; Won in semifinals vs. Buffalo Sabres, 4–2; Won in Stanley Cup Final vs. Philadelphia Flyers, 4–2 †
1980–81 †	1980–81 †	Campbell ‡	Patrick ↑	1st	80	48	18	14	—	110 #	355	260	18	15	3	97	47	Won in preliminary round vs. Toronto Maple Leafs, 3–0; Won in quarterfinals vs. Edmonton Oilers, 4–2; Won in semifinals vs. New York Rangers, 4–0; Won in Stanley Cup Final vs. Minnesota North Stars, 4–1 †
1981–82 †	1981–82 †	Wales^{[b]} ‡	Patrick ↑	1st	80	54	16	10	—	118 #	385	250	19	15	4	85	52	Won in division semifinals vs. Pittsburgh Penguins, 3–2; Won in division finals vs. New York Rangers, 4–2; Won in conference finals vs. Quebec Nordiques, 4–0; Won in Stanley Cup Final vs. Vancouver Canucks, 4–0 †
1982–83 †	1982–83 †	Wales ‡	Patrick	2nd	80	42	26	12	—	96	302	226	20	15	5	96	53	Won in division semifinals vs. Washington Capitals, 3–1; Won in division finals vs. New York Rangers, 4–2; Won in conference finals vs. Boston Bruins, 4–2; Won in Stanley Cup Final vs. Edmonton Oilers, 4–0 †
1983–84	1983–84	Wales ‡	Patrick ↑	1st	80	50	26	4	—	104	357	269	21	12	9	62	60	Won in division semifinals vs. New York Rangers, 3–2; Won in division finals vs. Washington Capitals, 4–1; Won in conference finals vs. Montreal Canadiens, 4–2; Lost in Stanley Cup Final vs. Edmonton Oilers, 1–4
1984–85	1984–85	Wales	Patrick	3rd	80	40	34	6	—	86	345	312	10	4	6	25	27	Won in division semifinals vs. Washington Capitals, 3–2; Lost in division finals vs. Philadelphia Flyers, 1–4
1985–86	1985–86	Wales	Patrick	3rd	80	39	29	12	—	90	327	284	3	0	3	4	11	Lost in division semifinals vs. Washington Capitals, 0–3
1986–87	1986–87	Wales	Patrick	3rd	80	35	33	12	—	82	279	281	14	7	7	35	42	Won in division semifinals vs. Washington Capitals, 4–3; Lost in division finals vs. Philadelphia Flyers, 3–4
1987–88	1987–88	Wales	Patrick ↑	1st	80	39	31	10	—	88	308	267	6	2	4	18	23	Lost in division semifinals vs. New Jersey Devils, 2–4
1988–89	1988–89	Wales	Patrick	6th	80	28	47	5	—	61	265	325	—	—	—	—	—	Did not qualify
1989–90	1989–90	Wales	Patrick	4th	80	31	38	11	—	73	281	288	5	1	4	13	22	Lost in division semifinals vs. New York Rangers, 1–4
1990–91	1990–91	Wales	Patrick	6th	80	25	45	10	—	60	223	290	—	—	—	—	—	Did not qualify
1991–92	1991–92	Wales	Patrick	5th	80	34	35	11	—	79	291	299	—	—	—	—	—	Did not qualify
1992–93	1992–93	Wales	Patrick	3rd	84	40	37	7	—	87	335	297	18	9	9	54	65	Won in division semifinals vs. Washington Capitals, 4–2; Won in division finals vs. Pittsburgh Penguins, 4–3; Lost in conference finals vs. Montreal Canadiens, 1–4
1993–94	1993–94	Eastern^{[c]}	Atlantic	4th	84	36	36	12	—	84	282	264	4	0	4	3	22	Lost in conference quarterfinals vs. New York Rangers, 0–4
1994–95^{[d]}	1994–95	Eastern	Atlantic	7th	48	15	28	5	—	35	126	158	—	—	—	—	—	Did not qualify
1995–96	1995–96	Eastern	Atlantic	7th	82	22	50	10	—	54	229	315	—	—	—	—	—	Did not qualify
1996–97	1996–97	Eastern	Atlantic	7th	82	29	41	12	—	70	240	250	—	—	—	—	—	Did not qualify
1997–98	1997–98	Eastern	Atlantic	4th	82	30	41	11	—	71	212	225	—	—	—	—	—	Did not qualify
1998–99	1998–99	Eastern	Atlantic	5th	82	24	48	10	—	58	194	244	—	—	—	—	—	Did not qualify
1999–2000	1999–2000	Eastern	Atlantic	5th	82	24	49	8	1^{[e]}	57	194	275	—	—	—	—	—	Did not qualify
2000–01	2000–01	Eastern	Atlantic	5th	82	21	51	7	3	52	185	268	—	—	—	—	—	Did not qualify
2001–02	2001–02	Eastern	Atlantic	2nd	82	42	28	8	4	96	239	220	7	3	4	21	22	Lost in conference quarterfinals vs. Toronto Maple Leafs, 3–4
2002–03	2002–03	Eastern	Atlantic	3rd	82	35	34	11	2	83	224	231	5	1	4	7	10	Lost in conference quarterfinals vs. Ottawa Senators, 1–4
2003–04	2003–04	Eastern	Atlantic	3rd	82	38	29	11	4	91	237	210	5	1	4	5	12	Lost in conference quarterfinals vs. Tampa Bay Lightning, 1–4
2004–05^{[f]}	2004–05	Eastern	Atlantic	Season not played due to lockout														
2005–06	2005–06	Eastern	Atlantic	4th	82	36	40	—^{[g]}	6	78	230	278	—	—	—	—	—	Did not qualify
2006–07	2006–07	Eastern	Atlantic	4th	82	40	30	—	12	92	248	240	5	1	4	11	17	Lost in conference quarterfinals vs. Buffalo Sabres, 1–4
2007–08	2007–08	Eastern	Atlantic	5th	82	35	38	—	9	79	194	243	—	—	—	—	—	Did not qualify
2008–09	2008–09	Eastern	Atlantic	5th	82	26	47	—	9	61	201	279	—	—	—	—	—	Did not qualify
2009–10	2009–10	Eastern	Atlantic	5th	82	34	37	—	11	79	222	264	—	—	—	—	—	Did not qualify
2010–11	2010–11	Eastern	Atlantic	5th	82	30	39	—	13	73	229	264	—	—	—	—	—	Did not qualify
2011–12	2011–12	Eastern	Atlantic	5th	82	34	37	—	11	79	203	255	—	—	—	—	—	Did not qualify
2012–13^{[h]}	2012–13	Eastern	Atlantic	3rd	48	24	17	—	7	55	139	139	6	2	4	17	25	Lost in conference quarterfinals vs. Pittsburgh Penguins, 2–4
2013–14	2013–14	Eastern	Metropolitan	8th	82	34	37	—	11	79	221	264	—	—	—	—	—	Did not qualify
2014–15	2014–15	Eastern	Metropolitan	3rd	82	47	28	—	7	101	252	230	7	3	4	15	16	Lost in first round vs. Washington Capitals, 3–4
2015–16	2015–16	Eastern	Metropolitan	4th	82	45	27	—	10	100	232	216	11	5	6	26	32	Won in first round vs. Florida Panthers, 4–2; Lost in second round vs. Tampa Bay Lightning, 1–4
2016–17	2016–17	Eastern	Metropolitan	5th	82	41	29	—	12	94	241	242	—	—	—	—	—	Did not qualify
2017–18	2017–18	Eastern	Metropolitan	6th	82	35	37	—	10	80	264	296	—	—	—	—	—	Did not qualify
2018–19	2018–19	Eastern	Metropolitan	2nd	82	48	27	—	7	103	228	196	8	4	4	19	19	Won in first round vs. Pittsburgh Penguins, 4–0; Lost in second round vs. Carolina Hurricanes, 0–4
2019–20^{[i]}	2019–20	Eastern	Metropolitan	5th	68	35	23	—	10	80	192	193	22	13	9	66	51	Won in qualifying round vs. Florida Panthers, 3–1; Won in first round vs. Washington Capitals, 4–1; Won in second round vs. Philadelphia Flyers, 4–3; Lost in conference finals vs. Tampa Bay Lightning, 2–4
2020–21^{[j]}	2020–21	—	East	4th	56	32	17	—	7	71	156	128	19	11	8	54	53	Won in first round vs. Pittsburgh Penguins, 4–2; Won in second round vs. Boston Bruins, 4–2; Lost in Stanley Cup semifinals vs. Tampa Bay Lightning, 3–4
2021–22	2021–22	Eastern	Metropolitan	5th	82	37	35	—	10	84	231	237	—	—	—	—	—	Did not qualify
2022–23	2022–23	Eastern	Metropolitan	4th	82	42	31	—	9	93	243	222	6	2	4	15	16	Lost in first round vs. Carolina Hurricanes, 2–4
2023–24	2023–24	Eastern	Metropolitan	3rd	82	39	27	—	16	94	246	263	5	1	4	12	19	Lost in first round vs. Carolina Hurricanes, 1–4
2024–25	2024–25	Eastern	Metropolitan	6th	82	35	35	—	12	82	224	260	—	—	—	—	—	Did not qualify
2025–26	2025–26	Eastern	Metropolitan	6th	82	43	34	–	5	91	233	241	—	—	—	—	—	Did not qualify
Totals					4,198	1,884	1,749	347	218	4,333	13,222	12,130	324	175	149	1,016	945	29 playoff appearances

== All-time records ==
Statistic	GP	W	L	T	OT
Regular season record (1972–present)	4,198	1,884	1,749	347	218
Postseason record (1972–present)	324	175	149	—	—
All-time regular and postseason record	4,522	2,059	1,898	347	218

== Notes ==
- ^{a} The NHL realigned before the 1974–75 season. The Islanders were placed in the Clarence Campbell Conference's Patrick Division.
- ^{b} Before the 1981–82 season, the NHL moved the Patrick Division to the Prince of Wales Conference.
- ^{c} The NHL realigned into Eastern and Western conferences prior to the 1993–94 season. New York was placed in the Eastern Conference's Atlantic Division.
- ^{d} The season was shortened to 48 games because of the 1994–95 NHL lockout.
- ^{e} Beginning with the 1999–2000 season, teams received one point for losing a regular season game in overtime.
- ^{f} The season was canceled because of the 2004–05 NHL lockout.
- ^{g} Before the 2005–06 season, the NHL instituted a penalty shootout for regular season games that remained tied after a five-minute overtime period, which prevented ties.
- ^{h} The season was shortened to 48 games because of the 2012–13 NHL lockout.
- ^{i} The season was suspended on March 12, 2020, because of the COVID-19 pandemic. The top 24 teams in the league qualified for the playoffs.
- ^{j} Due to the COVID-19 pandemic, the 2020–21 NHL season was shortened to 56 games.
