= 1994–95 Washington Capitals season =

NHL hockey team season

1994–95 Washington Capitals
- Division: 3rd Atlantic
- Conference: 6th Eastern
- 1994–95 record: 22–18–8
- Home record: 15–6–3
- Road record: 7–12–5
- Goals for: 136
- Goals against: 120

Team information
- General manager: David Poile
- Coach: Jim Schoenfeld
- Captain: Dale Hunter
- Alternate captains: Calle Johansson; Joe Juneau; Michal Pivonka
- Arena: USAir Arena
- Average attendance: 14,158
- Minor league affiliates: Portland Pirates; Hampton Roads Admirals

Team leaders
- Goals: Peter Bondra (34)
- Assists: Joe Juneau (38)
- Points: Peter Bondra (43); Joe Juneau
- Penalty minutes: Craig Berube (173)
- Plus/minus: Joe Reekie (+10)
- Wins: Jim Carey (18)
- Goals against average: Jim Carey (2.13)

The 1994–95 Washington Capitals season was the team's 21st season of play. After stumbling to a 3–10–5 record by February 28, the Capitals caught a break in bringing up 20-year-old rookie goaltender Jim Carey from the Portland Pirates for their March 2 game against the New York Islanders. The Capitals edged the Islanders 4–3 and Carey made 21 saves. Carey would finish his rookie season with an impressive 18–6–3 record, a 2.13 goals against average (GAA) and four shutouts. With the help of Carey's superb goaltending, Washington would go on to win 19 of their final 30 games and finish in sixth place in the Eastern Conference, with a 22–18–8 record for 52 points. Peter Bondra had an excellent season, leading all NHL skaters in goals (34) and shorthanded goals (6).

== Regular season ==
The Capitals tied the Buffalo Sabres for the most short-handed goals scored (13) and tied the St. Louis Blues for the fewest short-handed goals allowed (2) during the regular season.

=== Final standings ===
Atlantic Division
No.	CR		GP	W	L	T	GF	GA	Pts
1	2	**Philadelphia Flyers**	48	28	16	4	150	132	60
2	5	**New Jersey Devils**	48	22	18	8	136	121	52
3	6	**Washington Capitals**	48	22	18	8	136	120	52
4	8	**New York Rangers**	48	22	23	3	139	134	47
5	9	Florida Panthers	48	20	22	6	115	127	46
6	12	Tampa Bay Lightning	48	17	28	3	120	144	37
7	13	New York Islanders	48	15	28	5	126	158	35

Note: No. = Division rank, CR = Conference rank, W = Wins, L = Losses, T = Ties, GF = Goals For, GA = Goals Against, Pts = Points
Teams that qualified for the playoffs are highlighted in bold.

Eastern Conference
R		Div	GP	W	L	T	GF	GA	Pts
**1**	**Quebec Nordiques**	**NE**	**48**	**30**	**13**	**5**	**185**	**134**	65
**2**	**Philadelphia Flyers**	**AT**	**48**	**28**	**16**	**4**	**150**	**132**	60
**3**	**Pittsburgh Penguins**	**NE**	**48**	**29**	**16**	**3**	**181**	**158**	61
**4**	**Boston Bruins**	**NE**	**48**	**27**	**18**	**3**	**150**	**127**	57
**5**	**New Jersey Devils**	**AT**	**48**	**22**	**18**	**8**	**136**	**121**	52
**6**	**Washington Capitals**	**AT**	**48**	**22**	**18**	**8**	**136**	**120**	52
**7**	**Buffalo Sabres**	**NE**	**48**	**22**	**19**	**7**	**130**	**119**	51
**8**	**New York Rangers**	**AT**	**48**	**22**	**23**	**3**	**139**	**134**	47
9	Florida Panthers	AT	48	20	22	6	115	127	46
10	Hartford Whalers	NE	48	19	24	5	127	141	43
11	Montreal Canadiens	NE	48	18	23	7	125	148	43
12	Tampa Bay Lightning	AT	48	17	28	3	120	144	37
13	New York Islanders	AT	48	15	28	5	126	158	35
14	Ottawa Senators	NE	48	9	34	5	117	174	23

Divisions: AT – Atlantic, NE – Northeast

bold – Qualified for playoffs

== Playoffs ==
In the first round of the playoffs, the Capitals faced their old rivals from 1991, 1992 and 1994, the Pittsburgh Penguins. Washington had defeated Pittsburgh in the first round one year earlier and were hoping to do the same in 1995. The series started out well for the Capitals, as they defeated the Penguins 5–4 in the opening game. In Game 2, Washington held a 3–1 lead after two periods, but Pittsburgh scored four times in the third period to win 5–3 and tie the series at 1–1. Washington won Games 3 and 4 at home by identical scores of 6–2. The two teams skated to a 5–5 tie in Game 5, and with just 4:30 into the first overtime period, Luc Robitaille scored his fourth of the playoffs to keep the Penguins alive in the series. Peter Bondra, Dale Hunter, Jaromir Jagr and Kevin Stevens each scored twice in the game. Leading three games to two, the Capitals had a chance to eliminate the Penguins on home ice in Game 6, but goaltender Jim Carey struggled, allowing six goals on just 13 shots. Washington got only one shot (by Keith Jones) past Pittsburgh goaltender Ken Wregget, who made 30 saves. The Penguins went on to win the game 7–1 and tied the series at three games apiece. Jaromir Jagr, Luc Robitaille and Tomas Sandstrom each scored twice. In Game 7, Carey played better than he had in Game 6, stopping 15 of 17 shots, but Ken Wregget was solid again and stopped all 33 Washington shots to get the shutout. Troy Murray would add an empty-net goal to give Pittsburgh a 3–0 win and the series victory, four games to three. It was the second time in four years that the Penguins had defeated the Capitals after trailing 3–1 in a playoff series.

== Schedule and results ==
=== Regular season ===
1994–95 regular season
January: 1–3–1 (home: 1–1–0; road: 0–2–1)

Game	Date	Score	Opponent	Record	Recap
1	January 21, 1995	1–1 OT	@ Hartford Whalers (1994–95)	0–0–1	T
2	January 24, 1995	1–5	@ Quebec Nordiques (1994–95)	0–1–1	L
3	January 25, 1995	0–2	@ Montreal Canadiens (1994–95)	0–2–1	L
4	January 27, 1995	5–2	New York Islanders (1994–95)	1–2–1	W
5	January 29, 1995	1–4	Pittsburgh Penguins (1994–95)	1–3–1	L

February: 2–7–4 (home: 2–2–1; road: 0–5–3)

Game	Date	Score	Opponent	Record	Recap
6	February 2, 1995	0–1	Buffalo Sabres (1994–95)	1–4–1	L
7	February 4, 1995	3–2	Florida Panthers (1994–95)	2–4–1	W
8	February 7, 1995	1–2	@ Buffalo Sabres (1994–95)	2–5–1	L
9	February 8, 1995	4–5	@ New York Rangers (1994–95)	2–6–1	L
10	February 11, 1995	1–1 OT	@ Boston Bruins (1994–95)	2–6–2	T
11	February 13, 1995	3–5	@ Philadelphia Flyers (1994–95)	2–7–2	L
12	February 15, 1995	2–4	@ New Jersey Devils (1994–95)	2–8–2	L
13	February 18, 1995	4–2	Quebec Nordiques (1994–95)	3–8–2	W
14	February 20, 1995	0–2	New Jersey Devils (1994–95)	3–9–2	L
15	February 23, 1995	5–5 OT	@ Ottawa Senators (1994–95)	3–9–3	T
16	February 25, 1995	3–3 OT	@ New Jersey Devils (1994–95)	3–9–4	T
17	February 26, 1995	1–1 OT	Tampa Bay Lightning (1994–95)	3–9–5	T
18	February 28, 1995	2–4	@ Philadelphia Flyers (1994–95)	3–10–5	L

March: 11–2–2 (home: 6–1–2; road: 5–1–0)

Game	Date	Score	Opponent	Record	Recap
19	March 2, 1995	4–3	@ New York Islanders (1994–95)	4–10–5	W
20	March 4, 1995	5–1	Montreal Canadiens (1994–95)	5–10–5	W
21	March 5, 1995	4–2	New York Rangers (1994–95)	6–10–5	W
22	March 7, 1995	3–1	@ Boston Bruins (1994–95)	7–10–5	W
23	March 10, 1995	2–2 OT	Ottawa Senators (1994–95)	7–10–6	T
24	March 12, 1995	3–1	Tampa Bay Lightning (1994–95)	8–10–6	W
25	March 13, 1995	3–0	@ Tampa Bay Lightning (1994–95)	9–10–6	W
26	March 16, 1995	1–5	@ Florida Panthers (1994–95)	9–11–6	L
27	March 18, 1995	4–1	New York Rangers (1994–95)	10–11–6	W
28	March 20, 1995	5–0	@ Hartford Whalers (1994–95)	11–11–6	W
29	March 21, 1995	1–0	Ottawa Senators (1994–95)	12–11–6	W
30	March 25, 1995	2–2 OT	Philadelphia Flyers (1994–95)	12–11–7	T
31	March 26, 1995	3–4 OT	Hartford Whalers (1994–95)	12–12–7	L
32	March 29, 1995	4–2	@ Tampa Bay Lightning (1994–95)	13–12–7	W
33	March 31, 1995	6–4	Quebec Nordiques (1994–95)	14–12–7	W

April: 7–6–1 (home: 5–2–0; road: 2–4–1)

Game	Date	Score	Opponent	Record	Recap
34	April 2, 1995	2–1	Boston Bruins (1994–95)	15–12–7	W
35	April 4, 1995	5–4	@ New York Islanders (1994–95)	16–12–7	W
36	April 8, 1995	1–3	Philadelphia Flyers (1994–95)	16–13–7	L
37	April 11, 1995	1–3	@ Pittsburgh Penguins (1994–95)	16–14–7	L
38	April 12, 1995	1–2	New Jersey Devils (1994–95)	16–15–7	L
39	April 14, 1995	3–0	Florida Panthers (1994–95)	17–15–7	W
40	April 16, 1995	2–4	@ Quebec Nordiques (1994–95)	17–16–7	L
41	April 17, 1995	2–5	@ Montreal Canadiens (1994–95)	17–17–7	L
42	April 21, 1995	6–3	Hartford Whalers (1994–95)	18–17–7	W
43	April 22, 1995	2–1	@ Pittsburgh Penguins (1994–95)	19–17–7	W
44	April 24, 1995	4–5	@ New York Rangers (1994–95)	19–18–7	L
45	April 26, 1995	6–5	New York Islanders (1994–95)	20–18–7	W
46	April 28, 1995	5–1	Buffalo Sabres (1994–95)	21–18–7	W
47	April 30, 1995	2–2 OT	@ Florida Panthers (1994–95)	21–18–8	T

May: 1–0–0 (home: 1–0–0; road: 0–0–0)

Game	Date	Score	Opponent	Record	Recap
48	May 2, 1995	7–2	Pittsburgh Penguins (1994–95)	22–18–8	W

Legend: W Win (2 points) L Loss (0 points) T Tie (1 point)

=== Playoffs ===
1995 Stanley Cup playoffs
Eastern Conference Quarterfinals vs. (3) Pittsburgh Penguins – Penguins win 4–3

Game	Date	Score	Opponent	Series	Recap
1	May 6, 1995	5–4	@ Pittsburgh Penguins	Capitals lead 1–0	W
2	May 8, 1995	3–5	@ Pittsburgh Penguins	Series tied 1–1	L
3	May 10, 1995	6–2	Pittsburgh Penguins	Capitals lead 2–1	W
4	May 12, 1995	6–2	Pittsburgh Penguins	Capitals lead 3–1	W
5	May 14, 1995	5–6 OT	@ Pittsburgh Penguins	Capitals lead 3–2	L
6	May 16, 1995	1–7	Pittsburgh Penguins	Series tied 3–3	L
7	May 18, 1995	0–3	@ Pittsburgh Penguins	Penguins win 4–3	L

Legend: W Win L Loss

== Player statistics ==
=== Scoring ===
- Position abbreviations: C = Center; D = Defense; G = Goaltender; LW = Left wing; RW = Right wing
- † = Joined team via a transaction (e.g., trade, waivers, signing) during the season. Stats reflect time with the Capitals only.
- ‡ = Left team via a transaction (e.g., trade, waivers, release) during the season. Stats reflect time with the Capitals only.

No.	Player	Pos	Regular season						Playoffs					
No.	Player	Pos	GP	G	A	Pts	+/-	PIM	GP	G	A	Pts	+/-	PIM
12	Peter Bondra	RW	47	34	9	43	9	24	7	5	3	8	0	10
90	Joe Juneau	C	44	5	38	43	−1	8	7	2	6	8	−2	2
20	Michal Pivonka	C	46	10	23	33	3	50	7	1	4	5	2	21
6	Calle Johansson	D	46	5	26	31	−6	35	7	3	1	4	6	0
8	Dmitri Khristich	LW	48	12	14	26	0	41	7	1	4	5	4	0
22	Steve Konowalchuk	LW	46	11	14	25	7	44	7	2	5	7	2	12
10	Kelly Miller	LW	48	10	13	23	5	6	7	0	3	3	−2	4
32	Dale Hunter	C	45	8	15	23	−4	101	7	4	4	8	0	24
26	Keith Jones	RW	40	14	6	20	−2	65	7	4	4	8	−1	22
3	Sylvain Cote	D	47	5	14	19	2	53	7	1	3	4	−9	2
4	Jim Johnson	D	47	0	13	13	6	43	7	0	2	2	3	8
24	Mark Tinordi	D	42	3	9	12	−5	71	1	0	0	0	−2	2
9	Dave Poulin	C	29	4	5	9	2	10	2	0	0	0	−1	0
17	Sergei Gonchar	D	31	2	5	7	4	22	7	2	2	4	8	2
29	Joe Reekie	D	48	1	6	7	10	97	7	0	0	0	−4	2
27	Craig Berube	LW	43	2	4	6	−5	173	7	0	0	0	−3	29
25	Rob Pearson	RW	32	0	6	6	−6	96	3	1	0	1	0	17
2	Ken Klee	D	23	3	1	4	2	41	7	0	0	0	1	4
36	Mike Eagles†	C	13	1	3	4	2	8	7	0	2	2	1	4
14	Pat Peake	C	18	0	4	4	−6	12	—	—	—	—	—	—
41	Jason Allison	C	12	2	1	3	−3	6	—	—	—	—	—	—
34	Martin Gendron	RW	8	2	1	3	3	2	—	—	—	—	—	—
28	John Slaney	D	16	0	3	3	−3	6	—	—	—	—	—	—
23	Kevin Kaminski	C	27	1	1	2	−6	102	5	0	0	0	−1	36
15	Jeff Nelson	C	10	1	0	1	−2	2	—	—	—	—	—	—
31	Rick Tabaracci‡	G	8	0	1	1		2	—	—	—	—	—	—
44	Igor Ulanov†	D	3	0	1	1	3	2	2	0	0	0	0	4
18	Randy Burridge‡	LW	2	0	0	0	0	2	—	—	—	—	—	—
30	Jim Carey	G	28	0	0	0		0	7	0	0	0		4
35	Byron Dafoe	G	4	0	0	0		0	1	0	0	0		0
37	Olaf Kolzig	G	14	0	0	0		4	2	0	0	0		0

=== Goaltending ===
- ‡ = Left team via a transaction (e.g., trade, waivers, release) during the season. Stats reflect time with the Capitals only.

No.	Player	Regular season										Playoffs								
No.	Player	GP	W	L	T	SA	GA	GAA	SV%	SO	TOI	GP	W	L	SA	GA	GAA	SV%	SO	TOI
30	Jim Carey	28	18	6	3	654	57	2.13	.913	4	1604	7	2	4	151	25	4.19	.834	0	358
37	Olaf Kolzig	14	2	8	2	305	30	2.49	.902	0	724	2	1	0	21	1	1.35	.952	0	44
35	Byron Dafoe	4	1	1	1	80	11	3.53	.863	0	187	1	0	0	3	1	3.00	.667	0	20
31	Rick Tabaracci‡	8	1	3	2	147	16	2.44	.891	0	394	—	—	—	—	—	—	—	—	—

== Awards and records ==
=== Awards ===
Type	Award/honor	Recipient	Ref
League (annual)	NHL All-Rookie Team	Jim Carey (Goaltender)	
League (in-season)	NHL Player of the Month	Jim Carey (March)	
League (in-season)	NHL Rookie of the Month	Jim Carey (March)	

=== Milestones ===
Milestone	Player	Date	Ref
First game	Ken Klee	January 25, 1995	
First game	Sergei Gonchar	February 7, 1995	
First game	Jim Carey	March 2, 1995	
First game	Jeff Nelson	March 5, 1995	
First game	Martin Gendron	March 26, 1995	
600th assist	Dale Hunter	January 27, 1995	

== Draft picks ==
Washington's draft picks at the 1994 NHL entry draft held at the Hartford Civic Center in Hartford, Connecticut.

Round	#	Player	Nationality	College/Junior/Club team (League)
1	10	Nolan Baumgartner	Canada	Kamloops Blazers (WHL)
1	15	Alexander Kharlamov	Russia	CSKA Moscow (Russia)
2	41	Scott Cherrey	Canada	North Bay Centennials (OHL)
4	93	Matt Herr	United States	The Hotchkiss School (USHS-CT)
5	119	Yanick Jean	Canada	Chicoutimi Sagueneens (QMJHL)
6	145	Dmitri Mekeshkin	Russia	Avangard Omsk (Russia)
7	171	Dan Reja	Canada	London Knights (OHL)
8	197	Chris Patrick	United States	Kent School (USHS-CT)
9	223	John Tuohy	United States	South Kent School (USHS-CT)
10	249	Richard Zednik	Slovakia	Banska Bystrica (Slovakia)
11	275	Sergei Tertyshny	Russia	Traktor Chelyabinsk (Russia)

== See also ==
- 1994–95 NHL season
