= Adam Burt =

American ice hockey player (born 1969)

- Born: January 15, 1969 (age 57) Detroit, Michigan, U.S.
- Height: 6 ft 2 in (188 cm)
- Weight: 205 lb (93 kg; 14 st 9 lb)
- Position: Defense
- Shot: Left
- Played for: Hartford Whalers; Carolina Hurricanes; Philadelphia Flyers; Atlanta Thrashers
- National team: United States
- NHL draft: 39th overall, 1987; Hartford Whalers
- Playing career: 1989–2001

Adam Lee Burt (born January 15, 1969) is an American former professional ice hockey defenseman who played in the National Hockey League (NHL). He was drafted in the second round, 39th overall, by the Hartford Whalers in the 1987 NHL entry draft.

== Playing career ==
As a youth, Burt played in the 1982 Quebec International Pee-Wee Hockey Tournament with the Detroit Compuware minor ice hockey team.

Burt played four seasons for the Ontario Hockey League's North Bay Centennials before joining the Whalers organization. He made his NHL debut for Hartford in the 1988–89 season, and he remained with the franchise through its transformation into the Carolina Hurricanes in 1997. Burt parted ways with the Hurricanes on March 6, 1999, when he was traded to the Philadelphia Flyers in exchange for Andrei Kovalenko. Burt played his final NHL season with the Atlanta Thrashers in 2000–01.

In his NHL career, Burt played in 737 games. He recorded 37 goals and 115 assists. He also appeared in 21 Stanley Cup playoff games, tallying one assist.

== Personal life ==
Burt is a noted born-again Christian. He currently serves as the senior associate pastor of Every Nation Church, New York in Manhattan, New York. When asked in an interview how he reconciled his beliefs with his oft-chippy demeanor on the ice, he responded with a Biblical quote: "Whatever you do, do it heartily as unto the Lord," (Colossians 3:23 NASB). He now resides in New Jersey with his wife and two children.

== Career statistics ==
=== Regular season and playoffs ===
			Regular season					Playoffs
Season	Team	League	GP	G	A	Pts	PIM	GP	G	A	Pts	PIM
1985–86	North Bay Centennials	OHL	49	0	11	11	81	10	0	0	0	24
1986–87	North Bay Centennials	OHL	57	4	27	31	138	24	1	6	7	68
1987–88	North Bay Centennials	OHL	66	17	54	71	176	2	0	3	3	6
1987–88	Binghamton Whalers	AHL	—	—	—	—	—	2	1	1	2	0
1988–89	Hartford Whalers	NHL	5	0	0	0	6	—	—	—	—	—
1988–89	Binghamton Whalers	AHL	5	0	2	2	13	—	—	—	—	—
1988–89	North Bay Centennials	OHL	23	4	11	15	45	12	2	12	14	12
1989–90	Hartford Whalers	NHL	63	4	8	12	105	2	0	0	0	0
1990–91	Springfield Indians	AHL	9	1	3	4	22	—	—	—	—	—
1990–91	Hartford Whalers	NHL	42	2	7	9	63	—	—	—	—	—
1991–92	Hartford Whalers	NHL	66	9	15	24	93	2	0	0	0	0
1992–93	Hartford Whalers	NHL	65	6	14	20	116	—	—	—	—	—
1993–94	Hartford Whalers	NHL	63	1	17	18	75	—	—	—	—	—
1994–95	Hartford Whalers	NHL	46	7	11	18	65	—	—	—	—	—
1995–96	Hartford Whalers	NHL	78	4	9	13	121	—	—	—	—	—
1996–97	Hartford Whalers	NHL	71	2	11	13	79	—	—	—	—	—
1997–98	Carolina Hurricanes	NHL	76	1	11	12	106	—	—	—	—	—
1998–99	Carolina Hurricanes	NHL	51	0	3	3	46	—	—	—	—	—
1998–99	Philadelphia Flyers	NHL	17	0	1	1	14	6	0	0	0	4
1999–00	Philadelphia Flyers	NHL	67	1	6	7	45	11	0	1	1	4
2000–01	Atlanta Thrashers	NHL	27	0	2	2	27	—	—	—	—	—
NHL totals			737	37	115	152	961	21	0	1	1	8

=== International ===
Year	Team	Event	Result	GP	G	A	Pts	PIM
1987	United States	WJC	4th	7	0	1	1	8
1989	United States	WJC	5th	7	1	6	7	2
1993	United States	WC	6th	6	2	1	3	6
1998	United States	WC	12th	6	0	0	0	4
Junior totals				14	1	7	8	10
Senior totals				12	2	1	3	10
