= 1990–91 Minnesota North Stars season =

National Hockey League team season

1990–91 Minnesota North Stars
- Campbell Conference champions
- Division: 4th Norris
- Conference: 7th Campbell
- 1990–91 record: 27–39–14
- Home record: 19–15–6
- Road record: 8–24–8
- Goals for: 256
- Goals against: 266

Team information
- General manager: Bob Clarke
- Coach: Bob Gainey
- Captain: Curt Giles
- Alternate captains: Neal Broten; Dave Gagner; Basil McRae
- Arena: Met Center

Team leaders
- Goals: Dave Gagner (40)
- Assists: Neal Broten (56)
- Points: Dave Gagner (82)
- Penalty minutes: Shane Churla (286)
- Plus/minus: Jim Johnson and Dave Gagner (+9)
- Wins: Jon Casey (21)
- Goals against average: Jon Casey (2.98)

The 1990–91 Minnesota North Stars season was the North Stars' 24th season. The most striking aspect of the season was that despite qualifying for the playoffs with an under–.500 (or "losing") regular-season record, the team reached the 1991 Stanley Cup Final as the Clarence Campbell Conference champions. Minnesota had beaten Chicago and St. Louis (each in six games), teams that had finished nearly 40 points ahead of them in the regular season, before becoming the first Norris Division team to reach the Stanley Cup Final since the league had re-aligned a decade earlier when they eliminated the defending Stanley Cup champion Edmonton Oilers in five games — a classic "Cinderella" postseason. The North Stars finally saw their playoff run end in game six of the Stanley Cup Final when they lost to the Pittsburgh Penguins 8–0 in front of their home fans in the Met Center.

== Off-season ==
Weeks after their first-round loss to the Chicago Blackhawks, owners George and Gordon Gund sold the North Stars to a consortium led by Howard Baldwin, in exchange for purchasing the expansion franchise that would become the San Jose Sharks. Baldwin and his partners Morris Belzberg and Norman Green agreed to continue operating the North Stars in the Met Center, while opening negotiations with the owners of the NBA's Minnesota Timberwolves for an opportunity to invest in the team, or possibly share the Wolves' upcoming arena in the future.

=== NHL draft ===
Round	Pick	Player	Nationality	College/junior/club team
1	8	Derian Hatcher (D)	United States	North Bay Centennials (OHL)
3	50	Laurie Billeck (D)	Canada	Prince Albert Raiders (WHL)
4	70	Cal McGowan (C)	United States	Kamloops Blazers (WHL)
4	71	Frank Kovacs (LW)	Canada	Regina Pats (WHL)
5	92	Enrico Ciccone (D)	Canada	Trois-Rivieres Draveurs (QMJHL)
6	113	Roman Turek (G)	Czechoslovakia	Motor Ceske Budejovice (Czechoslovakia)
7	134	Jeff Levy (G)	United States	Rochester Mustangs (USHL)
8	155	Doug Barrault (RW)	Canada	Lethbridge Hurricanes (WHL)
9	176	Joe Biondi (C)	United States	University of Minnesota Duluth (WCHA)
10	197	Troy Binnie (LW)	Canada	Ottawa 67's (OHL)
11	218	Ole Eskild Dahlstrom (C)	Norway	Furuset (Norway)
12	239	J. P. McKersie (G)	United States	Madison West High School (USHS-WI)
S	13	Rod Houk (G)	Canada	University of Regina (CWUAA)

== Regular season ==
=== Final standings ===
Norris Division
	GP	W	L	T	GF	GA	Pts
**Chicago Blackhawks**	80	49	23	8	284	211	106
**St. Louis Blues**	80	47	22	11	310	250	105
**Detroit Red Wings**	80	34	38	8	273	298	76
**Minnesota North Stars**	80	27	39	14	256	266	68
Toronto Maple Leafs	80	23	46	11	241	318	57

Note: GP = Games played, W = Wins, L = Losses, T = Ties, Pts = Points, GF = Goals for, GA = Goals against
Note: Teams that qualified for the playoffs are highlighted in bold.

Campbell Conference
R		Div	GP	W	L	T	GF	GA	Pts
**1**	**p – Chicago Blackhawks**	**NRS**	**80**	**49**	**23**	**8**	**284**	**211**	**106**
**2**	**St. Louis Blues**	**NRS**	**80**	**47**	**22**	**11**	**310**	**250**	**105**
**3**	**Los Angeles Kings**	**SMY**	**80**	**46**	**24**	**10**	**340**	**254**	**102**
**4**	**Calgary Flames**	**SMY**	**80**	**46**	**26**	**8**	**344**	**263**	**100**
**5**	**Edmonton Oilers**	**SMY**	**80**	**37**	**37**	**6**	**272**	**272**	**80**
**6**	**Detroit Red Wings**	**NRS**	**80**	**34**	**38**	**8**	**273**	**298**	**76**
**7**	**Minnesota North Stars**	**NRS**	**80**	**27**	**39**	**14**	**256**	**266**	**68**
**8**	**Vancouver Canucks**	**SMY**	**80**	**28**	**43**	**9**	**243**	**315**	**65**
9	Winnipeg Jets	SMY	80	26	43	11	260	288	63
10	Toronto Maple Leafs	NRS	80	23	46	11	241	318	57

Divisions: NRS – Norris, SMY – Smythe

bold – Qualified for playoffs; p – Won Presidents' Trophy

== Schedule and results ==
1990–91 regular season
October

Game	Result	Date	Score	Opponent	Record
1	L	October 4, 1990	2–3	St. Louis Blues (1990–91)	0–1–0
2	W	October 6, 1990	4–2	New York Islanders (1990–91)	1–1–0
4	L	October 9, 1990	2–5	@ New Jersey Devils (1990–91)	1–3–0
5	T	October 11, 1990	3–3 OT	Boston Bruins (1990–91)	1–3–1
6	L	October 13, 1990	1–4	Chicago Blackhawks (1990–91)	1–4–1
7	L	October 17, 1990	2–5	@ Los Angeles Kings (1990–91)	1–5–1
8	T	October 20, 1990	2–2 OT	@ St. Louis Blues (1990–91)	1–5–2
9	L	October 21, 1990	1–7	@ Chicago Blackhawks (1990–91)	1–6–2
10	W	October 24, 1990	3–0	Hartford Whalers (1990–91)	2–6–2
11	L	October 26, 1990	6–8	@ Detroit Red Wings (1990–91)	2–7–2
12	T	October 27, 1990	2–2 OT	Detroit Red Wings (1990–91)	2–7–3
13	L	October 30, 1990	4–5	@ Toronto Maple Leafs (1990–91)	2–8–3

November

Game	Result	Date	Score	Opponent	Record
14	L	November 1, 1990	3–6	@ Philadelphia Flyers (1990–91)	2–9–3
15	W	November 3, 1990	2–0	@ Quebec Nordiques (1990–91)	3–9–3
16	T	November 4, 1990	2–2 OT	@ Montreal Canadiens (1990–91)	3–9–4
17	W	November 8, 1990	3–2	Quebec Nordiques (1990–91)	4–9–4
18	L	November 10, 1990	2–3 OT	Hartford Whalers (1990–91)	4–10–4
19	L	November 13, 1990	1–4	Pittsburgh Penguins (1990–91)	4–11–4
20	L	November 15, 1990	2–4	New York Rangers (1990–91)	4–12–4
21	L	November 17, 1990	2–3	St. Louis Blues (1990–91)	4–13–4
22	T	November 19, 1990	2–2 OT	@ New York Rangers (1990–91)	4–13–5
23	L	November 21, 1990	3–4	@ Detroit Red Wings (1990–91)	4–14–5
24	W	November 23, 1990	6–4	Vancouver Canucks (1990–91)	5–14–5
25	L	November 24, 1990	3–5	New Jersey Devils (1990–91)	5–15–5
26	T	November 27, 1990	1–1 OT	@ Vancouver Canucks (1990–91)	5–15–6
27	W	November 30, 1990	4–2	@ Winnipeg Jets (1990–91)	6–15–6

December

Game	Result	Date	Score	Opponent	Record
28	W	December 1, 1990	6–3	Pittsburgh Penguins (1990–91)	7–15–6
29	W	December 5, 1990	3–2	@ Toronto Maple Leafs (1990–91)	8–15–6
30	L	December 6, 1990	1–2 OT	Toronto Maple Leafs (1990–91)	8–16–6
31	W	December 8, 1990	7–0	Philadelphia Flyers (1990–91)	9–16–6
32	L	December 11, 1990	4–5	Calgary Flames (1990–91)	9–17–6
33	L	December 13, 1990	2–4	@ St. Louis Blues (1990–91)	9–18–6
34	W	December 15, 1990	5–1	Chicago Blackhawks (1990–91)	10–18–6
35	L	December 16, 1990	2–5	@ Chicago Blackhawks (1990–91)	10–19–6
36	L	December 20, 1990	3–4	@ Pittsburgh Penguins (1990–91)	10–20–6
37	L	December 22, 1990	2–6	@ Boston Bruins (1990–91)	10–21–6
38	W	December 23, 1990	5–2	@ Hartford Whalers (1990–91)	11–21–6
39	L	December 26, 1990	4–6	Winnipeg Jets (1990–91)	11–22–6
40	T	December 29, 1990	4–4 OT	Boston Bruins (1990–91)	11–22–7
41	L	December 31, 1990	2–4	Los Angeles Kings (1990–91)	11–23–7

January

Game	Result	Date	Score	Opponent	Record
42	L	January 2, 1991	2–6	@ Detroit Red Wings (1990–91)	11–24–7
43	T	January 3, 1991	3–3 OT	Toronto Maple Leafs (1990–91)	11–24–8
44	L	January 5, 1991	5–6	Vancouver Canucks (1990–91)	11–25–8
45	W	January 8, 1991	3–0	@ New York Islanders (1990–91)	12–25–8
46	L	January 12, 1991	3–5	Buffalo Sabres (1990–91)	12–26–8
47	L	January 13, 1991	3–5	@ Chicago Blackhawks (1990–91)	12–27–8
48	L	January 15, 1991	1–5	Montreal Canadiens (1990–91)	12–28–8
49	W	January 17, 1991	5–2	Washington Capitals (1990–91)	13–28–8
50	L	January 21, 1991	0–2	@ Winnipeg Jets (1990–91)	13–29–8
51	W	January 22, 1991	7–3	St. Louis Blues (1990–91)	14–29–8
52	T	January 25, 1991	2–2 OT	@ Washington Capitals (1990–91)	14–29–9
53	W	January 26, 1991	3–1	@ New Jersey Devils (1990–91)	15–29–9
54	L	January 28, 1991	0–4	@ Toronto Maple Leafs (1990–91)	15–30–9
55	W	January 30, 1991	5–2	Detroit Red Wings (1990–91)	16–30–9

February

Game	Result	Date	Score	Opponent	Record
56	W	February 2, 1991	6–4	@ Quebec Nordiques (1990–91)	17–30–9
57	L	February 4, 1991	3–5	@ Montreal Canadiens (1990–91)	17–31–9
58	W	February 7, 1991	4–2	Toronto Maple Leafs (1990–91)	18–31–9
59	W	February 9, 1991	6–5	Detroit Red Wings (1990–91)	19–31–9
60	L	February 12, 1991	4–5	@ New York Islanders (1990–91)	19–32–9
61	T	February 13, 1991	6–6 OT	@ Buffalo Sabres (1990–91)	19–32–10
62	W	February 16, 1991	3–0	@ Detroit Red Wings (1990–91)	20–32–10
63	W	February 20, 1991	5–1	Edmonton Oilers (1990–91)	21–32–10
64	T	February 23, 1991	3–3 OT	Chicago Blackhawks (1990–91)	21–32–11
65	T	February 26, 1991	2–2 OT	Philadelphia Flyers (1990–91)	21–32–12

March

Game	Result	Date	Score	Opponent	Record
66	T	March 1, 1991	1–1 OT	@ Edmonton Oilers (1990–91)	21–32–13
67	L	March 2, 1991	1–5	@ Calgary Flames (1990–91)	21–33–13
68	W	March 6, 1991	5–1	Edmonton Oilers (1990–91)	22–33–13
69	W	March 9, 1991	6–2	Detroit Red Wings (1990–91)	23–33–13
70	W	March 10, 1991	7–3	Calgary Flames (1990–91)	24–33–13
71	W	March 12, 1991	5–2	Buffalo Sabres (1990–91)	25–33–13
72	T	March 14, 1991	2–2 OT	@ St. Louis Blues (1990–91)	25–33–14
73	L	March 16, 1991	3–4 OT	@ Toronto Maple Leafs (1990–91)	25–34–14
74	W	March 17, 1991	4–3	Toronto Maple Leafs (1990–91)	26–34–14
75	L	March 22, 1991	1–3	@ Washington Capitals (1990–91)	26–35–14
76	L	March 24, 1991	4–5	@ Chicago Blackhawks (1990–91)	26–36–14
77	L	March 25, 1991	4–5	St. Louis Blues (1990–91)	26–37–14
78	L	March 28, 1991	5–6	@ Los Angeles Kings (1990–91)	26–38–14
79	W	March 30, 1991	2–1	Chicago Blackhawks (1990–91)	27–38–14
80	L	March 31, 1991	1–2	@ St. Louis Blues (1990–91)	27–39–14

Legend: Win (2 points) Loss (0 points) Tie (1 point)

== Player statistics ==
=== Skaters ===
Note: GP = Games played; G = Goals; A = Assists; Pts = Points; PIM = Penalties in minutes

		Regular season					Playoffs
Player	#	GP	G	A	Pts	PIM	GP	G	A	Pts	PIM
Dave Gagner	15	73	40	42	82	114	23	12	15	27	28
Brian Bellows	23	80	35	40	75	43	23	10	19	29	30
Brian Propp	16	79	26	47	73	58	23	8	15	23	28
Neal Broten	7	79	13	56	69	26	23	9	13	22	6
Mike Modano	9	79	28	36	64	61	23	8	12	20	16
Bobby Smith	18	73	15	31	46	60	23	8	8	16	56
Ulf Dahlen	22	66	21	18	39	6	15	2	6	8	4
Mark Tinordi	24	69	5	27	32	189	23	5	6	11	78
Doug Smail	14	57	7	13	20	38	1	0	0	0	0
Brian Glynn	6	66	8	11	19	83	23	2	6	8	18
Gaetan Duchesne	10	68	9	9	18	18	23	2	3	5	34
Perry Berezan	21	52	11	6	17	30	1	0	0	0	0
Ilkka Sinisalo	-	46	5	12	17	24	-	-	-	-	-
Larry Murphy	-	31	4	11	15	38	-	-	-	-	-
Curt Giles	2	70	4	10	14	48	10	1	0	1	16
Mike Craig	20	39	8	4	12	32	10	1	1	2	20
Neil Wilkinson	5	50	2	9	11	117	22	3	3	6	12
Jim Johnson	8	44	1	9	10	100	14	0	1	1	52
Stewart Gavin	12	38	4	4	8	36	21	3	10	13	20
Chris Dahlquist	4	42	2	6	8	33	23	1	6	7	20
Marc Bureau	11	9	0	6	6	4	23	3	2	5	20
Rob Zettler	3	47	1	4	5	119	-	-	-	-	-
Shane Churla	27	40	2	2	4	286	22	2	1	3	90
Shawn Chambers	26	29	1	3	4	24	23	0	7	7	16
Basil McRae	17	40	1	3	4	224	22	1	1	2	94
Larry DePalma	31	14	3	0	3	26	-	-	-	-	-
Frank Musil	-	8	0	2	2	23	-	-	-	-	-
Warren Babe	29	1	0	1	1	0	-	-	-	-	-
Pat MacLeod	32	1	0	1	1	0	-	-	-	-	-
Dan Keczmer	46	9	0	1	1	6	-	-	-	-	-
Peter Taglianetti	-	16	0	1	1	14	-	-	-	-	-
Steve Gotaas	34	1	0	0	0	2	-	-	-	-	-
Mitch Messier	37	2	0	0	0	0	-	-	-	-	-
Kevin Evans	44	4	0	0	0	19	-	-	-	-	-
Dean Kolstad	40	5	0	0	0	15	-	-	-	-	-
Mike McHugh	45	6	0	0	0	0	-	-	-	-	-
Don Barber	-	7	0	0	0	4	-	-	-	-	-

=== Goaltending ===
Note: GP = Games played; MIN = Minutes; W = Wins; L = Losses; T = Ties; SO = Shutouts; GAA = Goals against average

Player	GP	MIN	W	L	T	SO	GAA
Jon Casey	55	3185	21	20	11	3	2.98
Brian Hayward	26	1473	6	15	3	2	3.14
Jarmo Myllys	2	78	0	2	0	0	6.15
Kari Takko	2	119	0	2	0	0	6.05

== Playoffs ==
=== Norris Division Semi-Finals ===
Chicago vs. Minnesota
Date	Away	Home
April 4	Minnesota 4	3 Chicago	OT
April 6	Minnesota 2	5 Chicago
April 8	Chicago 6	5 Minnesota
April 10	Chicago 1	3 Minnesota
April 12	Minnesota 6	0 Chicago
April 14	Chicago 1	3 Minnesota
Minnesota wins series 4–2

=== Norris Division Finals ===
St. Louis vs. Minnesota
Date	Away	Home
April 18	Minnesota 2	1 St. Louis
April 20	Minnesota 2	5 St. Louis
April 22	St. Louis 1	5 Minnesota
April 24	St. Louis 4	8 Minnesota
April 26	Minnesota 2	4 St. Louis
April 28	St. Louis 2	3 Minnesota
Minnesota wins series 4–2

=== Campbell Conference Finals ===
Campbell Conference
Edmonton vs. Minnesota
Date	Away	Home
May 2	Minnesota 3	1 Edmonton
May 4	Minnesota 2	7 Edmonton
May 6	Edmonton 3	7 Minnesota
May 8	Edmonton 1	5 Minnesota
May 10	Minnesota 3	2 Edmonton
Minnesota wins series 4–1 and Clarence S. Campbell Bowl

=== Stanley Cup Final ===
Pittsburgh Penguins vs. Minnesota North Stars

Date	Away	Score	Home	Score	Notes
May 15	Minnesota North Stars	5	Pittsburgh Penguins	4	
May 17	Minnesota North Stars	1	Pittsburgh Penguins	4	
May 19	Pittsburgh Penguins	1	Minnesota North Stars	3	
May 21	Pittsburgh Penguins	5	Minnesota North Stars	3	
May 23	Minnesota North Stars	4	Pittsburgh Penguins	6	
May 25	Pittsburgh Penguins	8	Minnesota North Stars	0	

Pittsburgh wins best-of-seven series 4–2

== Awards and records ==
- Clarence S. Campbell Bowl

== Transactions ==
=== Trades ===
October 26, 1990	To Minnesota North Stars Brian Glynn	To Calgary Flames Frank Musil

November 1990	To Minnesota North Stars Brian Hayward	To Montreal Canadiens Jayson More
