= 1991 Stanley Cup Final =

1991 ice hockey championship series

	1	2	3	4	5	6	Total
Pittsburgh Penguins	4	4	1	5	6	8	4
Minnesota North Stars	5	1	3	3	4	0	2
- Location(s): Pittsburgh: Civic Arena (1, 2, 5); Bloomington: Met Center (3, 4, 6)
- Coaches: Pittsburgh: Bob Johnson; Minnesota: Bob Gainey
- Captains: Pittsburgh: Mario Lemieux; Minnesota: Curt Giles
- Referees: Don Koharski (1, 6); Andy Van Hellemond (2, 4); Kerry Fraser (3, 5)
- Dates: May 15–25, 1991
- MVP: Mario Lemieux (Penguins)
- Series-winning goal: Ulf Samuelsson (2:00, first)
- Hall of Famers: Penguins: Tom Barrasso (2023); Paul Coffey (2004); Ron Francis (2007); Mario Lemieux (1997); Joe Mullen (2000); Larry Murphy (2004); Mark Recchi (2017); Bryan Trottier (1997); North Stars: Mike Modano (2014); Coaches: Bob Gainey (1992, player); Bob Johnson (1992); Officials: Andy Van Hellemond (1999)
- Networks: Canada: (English): CBC (French): SRC; United States: (National): SportsChannel America (Pittsburgh area): KBL (1–2, 5), KDKA (3–4, 6) (Minnesota area): KMSP (1–2, 5), Midwest Sports Channel (3–4, 6)
- Announcers: (CBC) Bob Cole, Harry Neale, and Dick Irvin Jr. (SRC) Claude Quenneville and Gilles Tremblay (SportsChannel America) Jiggs McDonald and Bill Clement (KBL/KDKA) Mike Lange and Paul Steigerwald (KMSP/MSC) Doug McLeod and Lou Nanne

The 1991 Stanley Cup Final was the championship series of the National Hockey League's (NHL) 1990–91 season, and the culmination of the 1991 Stanley Cup playoffs. It was contested by the Pittsburgh Penguins and the Minnesota North Stars. It was the Penguins' first Final series appearance and their first Stanley Cup victory. This is the first and only (to date) Stanley Cup Final to feature two teams from the expansion group of 1967. It was Minnesota's second Final series appearance, and their last before the franchise's relocation to Dallas two years later. It was also the first time since 1983 that an American franchise would win the Stanley Cup. This was the first all-American finals since 1981, which also featured the North Stars in their first appearance.

This was also the first final since 1982 not to feature either of the two Alberta-based teams, the Calgary Flames or the Edmonton Oilers, and the first since 1981 not contested by a team from Western Canada, or Canada overall.

The Finals and the NHL season ended on May 25, marking the last time to date that the Stanley Cup playoffs ended before the month of June.

This series brought together four North Stars who were teammates on the other North Stars team to reach the Finals: Neal Broten, Curt Giles, and Bobby Smith for Minnesota, and Gordie Roberts for Pittsburgh.

The Penguins players had a decided edge in Finals experience, with four players having won a Stanley Cup. Bryan Trottier (who won four with the New York Islanders in 1980, 1981, 1982, and 1983), Paul Coffey (who won three with the Edmonton Oilers in 1984, 1985, and 1987), Jiri Hrdina and Joe Mullen (both with the Calgary Flames in 1989). On the other hand, Bobby Smith was the only North Star player that had won a Stanley Cup, having won with the Montreal Canadiens in 1986. Overall, the North Stars had six players with previous Finals appearances, compared to the Penguins five.

== Paths to the Finals ==
Minnesota defeated the first-place overall Chicago Blackhawks 4–2, the second-place overall St. Louis Blues 4–2, and the defending Cup champion Edmonton Oilers 4–1 to advance to the Finals. The North Stars became the first American team and first Norris Division team to win the Campbell Conference since the league re-aligned the divisions and adopted a divisional-based playoff format in 1981.

Pittsburgh defeated the New Jersey Devils 4–3, the Washington Capitals 4–1 and the Boston Bruins 4–2.

== Game summaries ==
Pittsburgh centre Mario Lemieux, despite missing a game due to a back injury, recorded 12 points in 5 games to lead all scorers in the series. He was awarded the Conn Smythe Trophy for his postseason efforts.

Lemieux scored one of the most famous goals in NHL history during the second period of game two. Receiving the puck in the Penguins' end of the ice, Lemieux skated solo into the North Stars' zone facing two defensemen (Shawn Chambers and Neil Wilkinson) as well as goaltender Jon Casey. Lemieux skirted the puck through the legs of Chambers, skated around him, baited goaltender Casey to commit left (Lemieux's right), then switched the puck to his backhand side and slid the puck into the net (before crashing into the net himself). A brief video of the goal has since been featured on Stanley Cup promotional advertisements by the NHL.

=== Game one ===
May 15	Minnesota North Stars	5–4	Pittsburgh Penguins	Civic Arena	Recap

Neal Broten scored two goals in a back and forth game one for the North Stars, as did his teammate Bobby Smith, including the game-winning goal early in the third period to gave Minnesota a 5–4 victory and a 1–0 lead in the series.

Scoring summary
Period	Team	Goal	Assist(s)	Time	Score
1st	PIT	Ulf Samuelsson (2)	Ron Francis (8)	03:45	1–0 PIT
1st	MNS	Neal Broten (7)	Unassisted	06:32	1–1
1st	MNS	Ulf Dahlen (1)	Bobby Smith (7) and Shawn Chambers (6)	09:49	2–1 MNS
2nd	PIT	Mario Lemieux (12) – sh	Ron Francis (9)	03:54	2–2
2nd	MNS	Marc Bureau (3) – sh	Stewart Gavin (8)	06:53	3–2 MNS
2nd	PIT	Scott Young (1) – pp	Larry Murphy (10) and Jaromir Jagr (6)	07:43	3–3
2nd	MNS	Neal Broten (8)	Mike Modano (11)	17:01	4–3 MNS
3rd	MNS	Bobby Smith (7)	Ulf Dahlen (5)	01:39	5–3 MNS
3rd	PIT	Joe Mullen (6)	Jaromir Jagr (7) and Scott Young (6)	10:35	5–4 MNS
Penalty summary
Period	Team	Player	Penalty	Time	PIM
1st	MNS	Brian Propp	Slashing	04:17	2:00
1st	PIT	Troy Loney	Elbowing	13:46	2:00
1st	MNS	Shawn Chambers	Hooking	12:32	2:00
1st	MNS	Mark Tinordi	High-sticking	13:45	2:00
1st	PIT	Mark Recchi	Interference	15:02	2:00
1st	MNS	Basil McRae	Unsportsmanlike conduct	18:13	2:00
1st	MNS	Marc Bureau	High-sticking	19:39	2:00
2nd	PIT	Gordie Roberts	Interference	02:01	2:00
2nd	MNS	Jim Johnson	Slashing	05:58	2:00
2nd	MNS	Marc Bureau	Holding	10:25	2:00
2nd	PIT	Paul Stanton	Hooking	19:11	2:00
3rd	PIT	Grant Jennings	Cross-checking	04:08	2:00
3rd	MNS	Jon Casey	Slashing	08:25	2:00

Shots by period
Team	1	2	3	Total
Minnesota	9	12	8	29
Pittsburgh	17	11	10	38

=== Game two ===
May 17	Minnesota North Stars	1–4	Pittsburgh Penguins	Civic Arena	Recap

Mario Lemieux scored one of the most famous goals in NHL history during the second period of game two. Receiving the puck in the Penguins' end of the ice, Lemieux skated solo into the North Stars' zone facing two defensemen (Shawn Chambers and Neil Wilkinson) as well as goaltender Jon Casey. Lemieux skirted the puck through the legs of Chambers, skated around him, baited goaltender Casey to commit left (Lemieux's right), then switched the puck to his backhand side and slid the puck into the net (before crashing into the net himself). A brief video of the goal has since been featured on Stanley Cup promotional advertisements by the NHL. Late in the third period, Pittsburgh defenseman Gordie Roberts received a major penalty for spearing and was ejected from the game. The Penguins went on to win the game 4–1, with goaltender Tom Barrasso stopping 39 of 40 shots, and Kevin Stevens scoring two goals.

Scoring summary
Period	Team	Goal	Assist(s)	Time	Score
1st	PIT	Bob Errey (4) – sh	Peter Taglianetti (1)	14:26	1–0 PIT
1st	PIT	Kevin Stevens (14) – pp	Mario Lemieux (22) and Larry Murphy (11)	19:10	2–0 PIT
2nd	MNS	Mike Modano (7) – pp	Shawn Chambers (7) and Jon Casey (1)	00:55	2–1 PIT
2nd	PIT	Mario Lemieux (13)	Phil Bourque (6)	15:04	3–1 PIT
2nd	PIT	Kevin Stevens (15)	Joe Mullen (5) and Larry Murphy (12)	16:32	4–1 PIT
3rd	None				
Penalty summary
Period	Team	Player	Penalty	Time	PIM
1st	PIT	Ron Francis	Hooking	01:07	2:00
1st	PIT	Bob Errey	Boarding	09:08	2:00
1st	PIT	Mark Recchi	Cross-checking	13:06	2:00
1st	PIT	Ulf Samuelsson	Holding	15:12	2:00
1st	MNS	Brian Bellows	Hooking	16:36	2:00
1st	MNS	Shawn Chambers	Interference	18:13	2:00
1st	PIT	Bench	Too many men on the ice	20:00	2:00
2nd	MNS	Gaetan Duchesne	Holding	06:22	2:00
2nd	PIT	Larry Murphy	Hooking	06:37	2:00
2nd	MNS	Bobby Smith	Interference	09:30	2:00
2nd	MNS	Brian Glynn	Roughing	17:27	2:00
2nd	MNS	Neil Wilkinson	Roughing	19:58	2:00
2nd	MNS	Mark Tinordi	Roughing	20:00	2:00
2nd	MNS	Mark Tinordi	Fighting – major	20:00	5:00
2nd	PIT	Troy Loney	Roughing	20:00	2:00
2nd	PIT	Troy Loney	Fighting – major	20:00	5:00
3rd	MNS	Mike Modano	High-sticking	05:29	2:00
3rd	MNS	Gaetan Duchesne	Hooking	10:39	2:00
3rd	MNS	Bobby Smith	Interference	09:30	2:00
3rd	PIT	Ulf Samuelsson	Holding	12:58	2:00
3rd	MNS	Marc Bureau	Roughing	16:20	2:00
3rd	PIT	Kevin Stevens	Roughing	16:20	2:00
3rd	MNS	Bryan Trottier	Misconduct	16:20	10:00
3rd	MNS	Dave Gagner	Roughing	17:03	2:00
3rd	PIT	Paul Stanton	Roughing	17:03	2:00
3rd	PIT	Gordie Roberts	Holding	17:34	2:00
3rd	PIT	Gordie Roberts	Spearing – major	17:34	5:00
3rd	PIT	Gordie Roberts	Game misconduct	17:34	10:00
3rd	MNS	Bench	Delay of game	19:41	2:00
3rd	PIT	Ron Francis	Holding	20:00	2:00

Shots by period
Team	1	2	3	Total
Minnesota	12	12	16	40
Pittsburgh	14	12	5	31

=== Game three ===
May 19	Pittsburgh Penguins	1–3	Minnesota North Stars	Met Center	Recap

Due to a disc herniation, Mario Lemieux did not dress for Pittsburgh in game three. After a scoreless first, Dave Gagner and Bobby Smith both scored in the second, and Gaetan Duchesne scored early in the third. Pittsburgh forward Kevin Stevens received a major penalty for spearing late in the game and was ejected. The North Stars went on to win the game 3–1, giving them a 2–1 lead in the series.

Scoring summary
Period	Team	Goal	Assist(s)	Time	Score
1st	None				
2nd	MNS	Dave Gagner (9)	Mike Modano (12) and Jim Johnson (1)	07:21	1–0 MNS
2nd	MNS	Bobby Smith (8)	Brian Bellows (18) and Chris Dahlquist (6)	07:54	2–0 MNS
3rd	PIT	Phil Bourque (5)	Jaromir Jagr (8) and Bryan Trottier (3)	01:23	2–1 MNS
3rd	MNS	Gaetan Duchesne (2)	Stewart Gavin (9) and Neal Broten (13)	02:01	3–1 MNS
Penalty summary
Period	Team	Player	Penalty	Time	PIM
1st	PIT	Bob Errey	Charging	09:08	2:00
1st	PIT	Ron Francis	Holding	13:44	2:00
1st	MNS	Bobby Smith	Interference	16:21	2:00
2nd	MNS	Basil McRae	Boarding	04:08	2:00
2nd	MNS	Shawn Chambers	Unsportsmanlike conduct	05:23	2:00
2nd	PIT	Mark Recchi	Unsportsmanlike conduct	05:23	2:00
2nd	MNS	Gaetan Duchesne	Holding	08:38	2:00
2nd	PIT	Peter Taglianetti	High-sticking	12:26	2:00
2nd	MNS	Jim Johnson	Roughing	17:28	2:00
2nd	PIT	Troy Loney	Roughing	17:28	2:00
3rd	MNS	Jim Johnson	High-sticking	07:20	2:00
3rd	PIT	Phil Bourque	Slashing	07:20	2:00
3rd	MNS	Brian Bellows	Roughing	08:09	2:00
3rd	PIT	Paul Stanton	Roughing	08:09	2:00
3rd	MNS	Dave Gagner	Roughing	08:13	2:00
3rd	PIT	Randy Gilhen	Holding	08:13	2:00
3rd	PIT	Ulf Samuelsson	Elbowing	08:53	2:00
3rd	MNS	Chris Dahlquist	Tripping	13:34	2:00
3rd	PIT	Kevin Stevens	Spearing – major	18:47	5:00
3rd	PIT	Kevin Stevens	Game misconduct	18:47	10:00
3rd	PIT	Tom Barrasso	Slashing	19:21	2:00
3rd	MNS	Brian Bellows	Misconduct	19:53	10:00
3rd	PIT	Randy Gilhen	Misconduct	19:53	10:00
3rd	MNS	Bobby Smith	High-sticking	20:00	2:00
3rd	PIT	Bob Errey	Charging	20:00	2:00

Shots by period
Team	1	2	3	Total
Pittsburgh	7	8	15	30
Minnesota	12	8	13	33

=== Game four ===
May 21	Pittsburgh Penguins	5–3	Minnesota North Stars	Met Center	Recap

The Penguins won game four 5–3, with five different Pittsburgh players scoring goals. With 6:57 left in the third period, Pittsburgh forward Troy Loney hit Minnesota defenseman Mark Tinordi in the head with his stick, resulting in a major penalty and Loney being ejected from the game.

Scoring summary
Period	Team	Goal	Assist(s)	Time	Score
1st	PIT	Kevin Stevens (16)	Unassisted	00:58	1–0 PIT
1st	PIT	Ron Francis (5)	Kevin Stevens (14) and Joe Mullen (6)	02:36	2–0 PIT
1st	PIT	Mario Lemieux (14)	Mark Recchi (24) and Larry Murphy (13)	02:58	3–0 PIT
1st	MNS	Dave Gagner (10)	Brian Bellows (19) and Ulf Dahlen (6)	18:22	3–1 PIT
2nd	PIT	Bryan Trottier (3)	Bob Errey (2) and Jaromir Jagr (9)	09:55	4–1 PIT
2nd	MNS	Brian Propp (8) – pp	Dave Gagner (14)	13:10	4–2 PIT
2nd	MNS	Mike Modano (8) – pp	Brian Propp (13) and Dave Gagner (15)	18:25	4–3 PIT
3rd	PIT	Phil Bourque (6) – en	Joe Mullen (7) and Mario Lemieux (23)	19:45	5–3 PIT
Penalty summary
Period	Team	Player	Penalty	Time	PIM
1st	PIT	Ulf Samuelsson	Charging	07:27	2:00
1st	MNS	Brian Propp	High-sticking	07:44	2:00
1st	PIT	Paul Stanton	High-sticking	07:44	2:00
1st	MNS	Jim Johnson	Holding	14:45	2:00
1st	PIT	Ulf Samuelsson	Holding	18:38	2:00
2nd	MNS	Mike Modano	Slashing	04:28	2:00
2nd	MNS	Basil McRae	Roughing – double minor	11:22	4:00
2nd	PIT	Larry Murphy	Roughing	11:22	2:00
2nd	PIT	Kevin Stevens	Holding	11:49	2:00
2nd	MNS	Brian Bellows	Roughing	12:34	2:00
2nd	PIT	Mario Lemieux	Interference	12:34	2:00
2nd	PIT	Mario Lemieux	Roughing	12:34	2:00
2nd	PIT	Larry Murphy	Roughing	16:59	2:00
2nd	PIT	Bob Errey	Hooking	18:06	2:00
2nd	MNS	Dave Gagner	Roughing	18:50	2:00
3rd	PIT	Troy Loney	High-sticking – major	13:03	5:00
3rd	PIT	Troy Loney	Game misconduct	13:03	10:00
3rd	MNS	Jon Casey	Interference	16:52	2:00

Shots by period
Team	1	2	3	Total
Pittsburgh	13	5	6	24
Minnesota	14	17	7	38

=== Game five ===
May 23	Minnesota North Stars	4–6	Pittsburgh Penguins	Civic Arena	Recap

Mario Lemieux recorded three points for Pittsburgh in game five, Mark Recchi scored twice, and the Penguins defeated the North Stars 6–4.

Scoring summary
Period	Team	Goal	Assist(s)	Time	Score
1st	PIT	Mario Lemieux (15) – pp	Larry Murphy (14) and Paul Coffey (8)	05:36	1–0 PIT
1st	PIT	Kevin Stevens (17) – pp	Paul Coffey (9) and Larry Murphy (15)	10:08	2–0 PIT
1st	PIT	Mark Recchi (9)	Mario Lemieux (24) and Phil Bourque (7)	11:45	3–0 PIT
1st	PIT	Mark Recchi (10)	Mario Lemieux (25) and Larry Murphy (16)	13:41	4–0 PIT
1st	MNS	Neal Broten (9) – sh	Mark Tinordi (6)	14:52	4–1 PIT
2nd	MNS	Dave Gagner (11) – sh	Brian Propp (14)	06:54	4–2 PIT
2nd	PIT	Ron Francis (6)	Joe Mullen (8)	16:26	5–2 PIT
3rd	MNS	Ulf Dahlen (2)	Bobby Smith (8) and Gaetan Duchesne (3)	01:36	5–3 PIT
3rd	MNS	Dave Gagner (12)	Brian Propp (15) and Stewart Gavin (10)	07:42	5–4 PIT
3rd	PIT	Troy Loney (2)	Larry Murphy (17) and Ron Francis (10)	18:21	6–4 PIT
Penalty summary
Period	Team	Player	Penalty	Time	PIM
1st	MNS	Brian Glynn	Cross-checking	03:38	2:00
1st	PIT	Bryan Trottier	Cross-checking	07:07	2:00
1st	MNS	Mark Tinordi	Hooking	09:54	2:00
1st	MNS	Shane Churla	Roughing	14:26	2:00
1st	MNS	Basil McRae	Charging	14:26	2:00
1st	MNS	Basil McRae	Roughing	14:26	2:00
1st	MNS	Basil McRae	Unsportsmanlike conduct	14:26	2:00
1st	PIT	Jim Paek	Roughing	14:26	2:00
1st	PIT	Kevin Stevens	Roughing	14:26	2:00
2nd	MNS	Chris Dahlquist	Cross-checking	05:23	2:00
2nd	PIT	Bryan Trottier	Tripping	10:46	2:00
2nd	MNS	Dave Gagner	Interference	09:54	2:00
2nd	MNS	Peter Taglianetti	Holding	14:53	2:00
2nd	PIT	Phil Bourque	Illegal equipment	17:20	2:00
3rd	PIT	Peter Taglianetti	Cross-checking	08:40	2:00
3rd	MNS	Dave Gagner	Tripping	09:49	2:00
3rd	MNS	Brian Glynn	Cross-checking	10:05	2:00
3rd	MNS	Mark Tinordi	Roughing	12:00	2:00
3rd	MNS	Kevin Stevens	Roughing	12:00	2:00
3rd	MNS	Dave Gagner	Roughing	19:02	2:00
3rd	PIT	Mario Lemieux	Roughing	19:02	2:00

Shots by period
Team	1	2	3	Total
Minnesota	7	9	9	25
Pittsburgh	18	5	8	31

=== Game six ===
May 25	Pittsburgh Penguins	8–0	Minnesota North Stars	Met Center	Recap

Pittsburgh dominated game six early and often, with Joe Mullen recording two goals and an assist, and Tom Barrasso made 39 saves to record his first career playoff shutout in an 8–0 victory, which at the time was the most goals scored by a team in a Cup-clinching game, until it was surpassed by the Vegas Golden Knights in game five of 2023 Stanley Cup Final against the Florida Panthers.

Mario Lemieux, who recorded four points during the game, as well as a total of 44 points during the playoffs, was awarded the Conn Smythe Trophy as Most Valuable Player of the postseason.

Scoring summary
Period	Team	Goal	Assist(s)	Time	Score
1st	PIT	Ulf Samuelsson (3) – pp	Bryan Trottier (4) and Peter Taglianetti (2)	02:00	1–0 PIT
1st	PIT	Mario Lemieux (16) – sh	Larry Murphy (18)	12:19	2–0 PIT
1st	PIT	Joe Mullen (7) - pp	Peter Taglianetti (3), Kevin Stevens (15)	13:14	3–0 PIT
2nd	PIT	Bob Errey (5)	Jaromir Jagr (10) and Mario Lemieux (26)	13:15	4–0 PIT
2nd	PIT	Ron Francis (7)	Joe Mullen (9)	14:28	5–0 PIT
2nd	PIT	Joe Mullen (8)	Kevin Stevens (16) and Ulf Samuelsson (2)	18:44	6–0 PIT
3rd	PIT	Jim Paek (1)	Mario Lemieux (27)	01:29	7–0 PIT
3rd	PIT	Larry Murphy (5) – pp	Mario Lemieux (28)	13:45	8–0 PIT
Penalty summary
Period	Team	Player	Penalty	Time	PIM
1st	MNS	Neal Broten	Interference	00:09	2:00
1st	MNS	Jim Johnson	High-sticking	06:20	2:00
1st	PIT	Kevin Stevens	Holding	10:25	2:00
1st	PIT	Gordie Roberts	Roughing	10:59	2:00
1st	MNS	Mike Modano	Interference	11:17	2:00
1st	PIT	Gordie Roberts	Interference	13:58	2:00
1st	PIT	Peter Taglianetti	Tripping	17:35	2:00
2nd	MNS	Shane Churla	Roughing	08:03	2:00
2nd	MNS	Basil McRae	Misconduct	08:03	10:00
2nd	MNS	Mark Tinordi	Roughing – double minor	08:03	4:00
2nd	PIT	Mark Recchi	Roughing	08:03	2:00
2nd	PIT	Ulf Samuelsson	Roughing	08:03	2:00
2nd	MNS	Dave Gagner	Roughing	15:18	2:00
3rd	MNS	Basil Mcrae	Slashing	13:03	2:00
3rd	MNS	Stewart Gavin	Slashing	13:03	2:00
3rd	PIT	Kevin Stevens	Slashing	13:03	2:00

Shots by period
Team	1	2	3	Total
Pittsburgh	11	9	8	28
Minnesota	16	7	16	39

== Team rosters ==
Years indicated in boldface under the "Finals appearance" column signify that the player won the Stanley Cup in the given year.

=== Minnesota North Stars ===
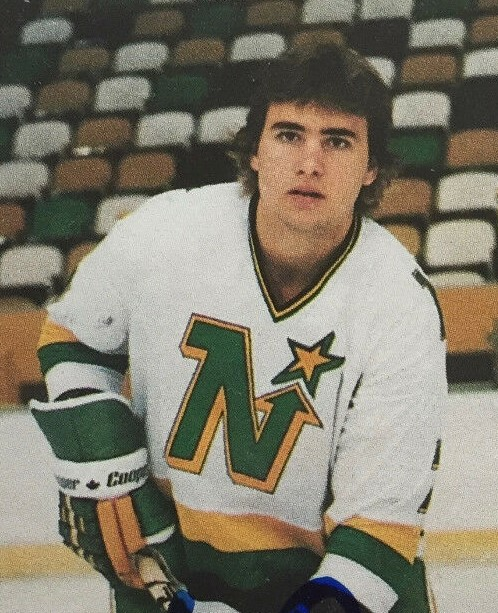
Neal Broten acted as team captain for the North Stars playoff run.

#	Nat	Player	Position	Hand	Acquired	Place of birth	Finals appearance
23	(Canada)	Brian Bellows	LW	R	1982	St. Catharines, Ontario	first
21	(Canada)	Perry Berezan	C	R	1988–89	Edmonton, Alberta	second (1986)
7	(United States)	Neal Broten – **A**	C	L	1979	Roseau, Minnesota	second (1981)
28	(Canada)	Marc Bureau	C	R	1990–91	Trois-Rivières, Quebec	first
30	(United States)	Jon Casey	G	L	1984–85	Grand Rapids, Minnesota	first
26	(United States)	Shawn Chambers	D	L	1987	Royal Oak, Michigan	first
27	(Canada)	Shane Churla	RW	R	1989–90	Fernie, British Columbia	first
20	(Canada)	Mike Craig	RW	R	1989	St. Mary's, Ontario	first
22	(Sweden)	Ulf Dahlen	RW	L	1989–90	Östersund, Sweden	first
4	(United States)	Chris Dahlquist	D	L	1990–91	Fridley, Minnesota	first
11	(Canada)	Gaetan Duchesne	LW	L	1989–90	Quebec City, Quebec	first
15	(Canada)	Dave Gagner – **A**	C	L	1987–88	Chatham, Ontario	first
12	(Canada)	Stewart Gavin	RW	L	1988–89	Ottawa, Ontario	first
2	(Canada)	Curt Giles – **C**	D	L	1987–88	The Pas, Manitoba	second (1981) (did not play)
6	(Canada)	Brian Glynn	D	L	1990–91	Iserlohn, West Germany	first
1	(Canada)	Brian Hayward	G	L	1990–91	Georgetown, Ontario	second (1989)
8	(United States)	Jim Johnson	D	L	1991–92	New Hope, Minnesota	first
17	(Canada)	Basil McRae – **A**	LW	L	1987–88	Beaverton, Ontario	first
9	(United States)	Mike Modano	C	L	1988	Livonia, Michigan	first
16	(Canada)	Brian Propp	LW	L	1990–91	Lanigan, Saskatchewan	fifth (1980, 1985, 1987, 1990)
14	(Canada)	Doug Smail	LW	L	1990–91	Moose Jaw, Saskatchewan	first
18	(Canada)	Bobby Smith	C	L	1990–91	North Sydney, Nova Scotia	fourth (1981, **1986**, 1989)
24	(Canada)	Mark Tinordi	D	L	1988–89	Red Deer, Alberta	first
5	(Canada)	Neil Wilkinson	D	R	1986	Selkirk, Manitoba	first

Note: Neal Broten served as the North Stars acting team captain during the 1991 Stanley Cup playoffs. Curt Giles, who was injured late in the season and played in only 10 playoff games, missing the entire finals, is listed as the official team captain.

=== Pittsburgh Penguins ===
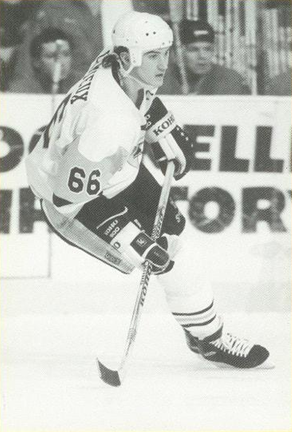
Mario Lemieux captained the Penguins to their first Stanley Cup Final appearance.

#	Nat	Player	Position	Hand	Acquired	Place of birth	Finals appearance
35	(United States)	Tom Barrasso	G	R	1988–89	Boston, Massachusetts	first
29	(United States)	Phil Bourque	LW	L	1983–84	Chelmsford, Massachusetts	first
16	(United States)	Jay Caufield	RW	R	1988–89	Philadelphia, Pennsylvania	first (did not play)
77	(Canada)	Paul Coffey – **A**	D	L	1987–88	Weston, Ontario	fifth (1983, **1984**, **1985**, **1987**)
12	(Canada)	Bob Errey – **A**	LW	L	1983	Montreal, Quebec	first
9	(Canada)	Ron Francis	C	L	1990–91	Sault Ste. Marie, Ontario	first
15	(Canada)	Randy Gilhen	C	L	1990–91	Zweibrücken, West Germany	first
23	(Canada)	Randy Hillier – **A**	D	R	1984–85	Toronto, Ontario	first (did not play)
38	(Czechoslovakia)	Jiri Hrdina	C	L	1990–91	Prague, Czechoslovakia	second (**1989**)
68	(Czechoslovakia)	Jaromir Jagr	RW	L	1990	Kladno, Czechoslovakia	first
3	(Canada)	Grant Jennings	D	L	1990–91	Hudson Bay, Saskatchewan	first
66	(Canada)	Mario Lemieux – **C**	C	R	1984	Montreal, Quebec	first
24	(Canada)	Troy Loney	LW	L	1982	Bow Island, Alberta	first
7	(United States)	Joe Mullen	RW	R	1990–91	New York, New York	third (1986, **1989**)
55	(Canada)	Larry Murphy	D	R	1989–90	Scarborough, Ontario	first
2	(Canada)	Jim Paek	D	L	1985	Seoul, South Korea	first
10	(Canada)	Barry Pederson	C	R	1991–92	Big River, Saskatchewan	first (did not play)
40	(Canada)	Frank Pietrangelo	G	L	1983	Niagara Falls, Ontario	first
8	(Canada)	Mark Recchi	RW	L	1988	Kamloops, British Columbia	first
28	(United States)	Gordie Roberts	D	L	1990–91	Detroit, Michigan	second (1981)
5	(Sweden)	Ulf Samuelsson	D	L	1990–91	Fagersta, Sweden	first
22	(United States)	Paul Stanton	D	R	1985	Boston, Massachusetts	first
25	(United States)	Kevin Stevens	LW	L	1983–84	Brockton, Massachusetts	first
32	(United States)	Peter Taglianetti	D	L	1990–91	Framingham, Massachusetts	first
19	(Canada)	Bryan Trottier – **A**	C	L	1990–91	Val Marie, Saskatchewan	sixth (**1980**, **1981**, **1982**, **1983**, 1984)
34	(United States)	Scott Young	RW/C	R	1990–91	Clinton, Massachusetts	first
1	(Canada)	Wendell Young	G	L	1988–89	Halifax, Nova Scotia	first (did not play)

== Stanley Cup engraving ==
The 1991 Stanley Cup was presented to Penguins captain Mario Lemieux by NHL President John Ziegler following the Penguins 8–0 win over the North Stars in game six.

The following Penguins players and staff had their names engraved on the Stanley Cup

1990–91 Pittsburgh Penguins

=== Players ===
Centres

- 9 Ron Francis
- 10 Barry Pederson †
- 15 Randy Gilhen
- 19 Bryan Trottier (A)
- 38 Jiri Hrdina
- 66 Mario Lemieux (Captain)

Wingers

- 7 Joe Mullen
- 8 Mark Recchi
- 12 Bob Errey (A)
- 16 Jay Caufield ‡
- 24 Troy Loney
- 25 Kevin Stevens
- 29 Phil Bourque
- 34 Scott Young*
- 68 Jaromir Jagr

Defencemen

- 2 Jim Paek
- 3 Grant Jennings
- 5 Ulf Samuelsson
- 22 Paul Stanton
- 23 Randy Hillier (A)
- 28 Gordie Roberts
- 32 Peter Taglianetti
- 55 Larry Murphy
- 77 Paul Coffey (A)

Goaltenders

- 35 Tom Barrasso
- 40 Frank Pietrangelo
- 1 Wendell Young
- * Played both centre and wing.
- † Did not play or dress in the Final.
- ‡ Did not play in the Final. Name engraved on Stanley Cup despite not officially qualifying. (Note: Automatic qualification for a player's name to be engraved on the Stanley Cup: Playing in (for a goaltender, dressing for) at least one Stanley Cup Final game or at least half of regular season games for the Stanley Cup winning team.)

=== Coaching and administrative staff ===
- Edward J. DeBartolo Sr. (Chairman/Owner)
- Marie Denise DeBartolo York (President/Owner)
- Paul Martha (Vice President-General Council), Craig Patrick (Vice President/General Manager)
- William Scotty Bowman (Director of Player Development-Recruitment), Bob Johnson (Head Coach)
- Rick Kehoe (Asst. Coach), Rick Paterson (Asst. Coach), Barry Smith (Asst. Coach)
- Gilles Meloche (Goaltending Coach/Scout)
- Steve Latin (Equipment Manager), Charles "Skip" Thayer (Trainer)
- John Welday (Strength-Conditioning Coach), Greg Malone (Head Scout)

=== Engraving notes ===
- #16 Jay Caufield (RW) played in only 23 games. His name was engraved on the Stanley Cup because he spent the whole season with Pittsburgh.
- Pierre McGuire, Les Binkley, John Gill, Charlie Hodge, Ralph Cox were with the team as scouts in 1990–91, but names were not included on the Stanley Cup that year. All five of these scouts were awarded Stanley Cup rings.
- Randy Gilhen was the first German-born player to win the Stanley Cup, but grew up in Winnipeg, Manitoba, Canada
- Jim Paek was the first Korean-born hockey player to both play in the NHL, and have his name engraved on the Stanley Cup.
- Barry Pederson did not play a single game in the 1991 playoffs, but he qualified to get his name on the Stanley Cup and get a Stanley Cup ring because he played 46 games during the season.
- Pittsburgh filled the last spot on the bottom ring. The larger rings were filled a year early then planned. See 1965 Stanley Cup Final and 1992 Stanley Cup Final.

=== Player notes ===
- The players listed below were on the roster, but did not qualify to be included on the Stanley Cup.
  - Gord Dineen (D) – 9 regular season games
  - #20 Jamie Leach (RW) – 7 regular season games
  - #18 Ken Priestlay (C) – 2 regular season games
  - #27 Gilbert Delorme (D) – missed the whole season due to a car accident in the offseason.
  - #30 Bruce Racine (G) – was called up from the minors to serve as back-up to Frank Pietrangelo. He was dressed for the last two games of round one, and first two games of round two. Both Wendell Young (who missed first three rounds due to injury), and Tom Barrasso (missed four games due to injury) were unable to play. Racine's name was left off the Stanley Cup, because he had not played in the NHL - in fact, Racine has never played for Pittsburgh. His only NHL experience came in 1995-96 for the St. Louis Blues.
- Dineen, Leach, and Priestlay spent most of the regular season in the minors. Racine spent the entire regular season in the minors. Delorme missed the entire season due to injury.

== Broadcasting ==
In Canada, the series was televised in English on the CBC and in French on SRC.

In the United States, the series aired nationally on SportsChannel America. However, SportsChannel America's national coverage was blacked out in the Minnesota and Pittsburgh areas due to the local rights to North Stars and Penguins games in those respective TV markets. In Minnesota, KMSP-TV aired games one, two and five while the Midwest Sports Channel had games three, four, and six. In Pittsburgh, KBL televised games one, two and five while KDKA aired games three, four, and six. Had there been a game seven, it would have aired on KMSP-TV in Minnesota and KBL in Pittsburgh respectively.

== See also ==
- 1990–91 NHL season
- List of Stanley Cup champions
- 1990–91 Minnesota North Stars season
- 1990–91 Pittsburgh Penguins season

== Notes ==
Preceded by Edmonton Oilers; 1990	Pittsburgh Penguins; Stanley Cup champions 1991	Succeeded by Pittsburgh Penguins; 1992
