= List of Dallas Stars award winners =

Dallas Stars awards
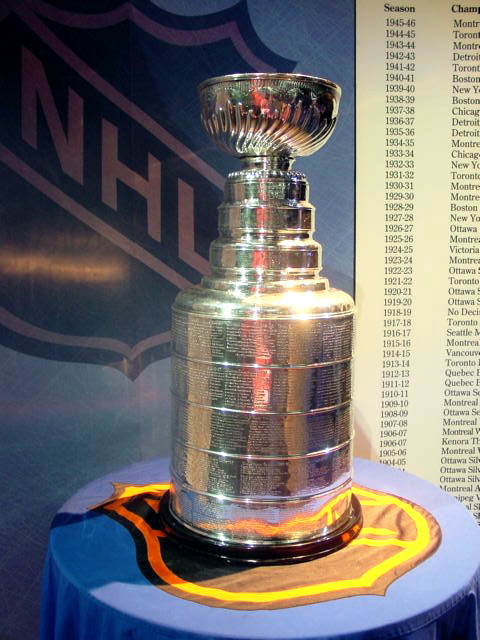
- The Dallas Stars have won the Stanley Cup (above) one time.

Team trophies
- Award*: Wins
- Stanley Cup: 1
- Clarence S. Campbell Bowl: 4
- Presidents' Trophy: 2

Individual awards
- Award*: Wins
- Art Ross Trophy: 1
- Bill Masterton Memorial Trophy: 1
- Calder Memorial Trophy: 2
- Conn Smythe Trophy: 1
- Frank J. Selke Trophy: 3
- General Manager of the Year Award: 3
- Lester Patrick Trophy: 1
- NHL Foundation Player Award: 1
- Roger Crozier Saving Grace Award: 3
- William M. Jennings Trophy: 1

Total
- Awards won: 24

This is a list of Dallas Stars award winners. It also includes players and data from the previous incarnation of the franchise, the Minnesota North Stars.

== League awards ==
=== Team trophies ===
Team trophies awarded to the Dallas Stars franchise
Award	Description	Times won	Seasons	References
Stanley Cup	NHL championship	1	1998–99	
Clarence S. Campbell Bowl	Campbell/Western Conference playoff championship	4	1990–91, 1998–99, 1999–2000, 2019–20	
Presidents' Trophy	Most regular season points	2	1997–98, 1998–99	

=== Individual awards ===
Individual awards won by Dallas Stars franchise players and staff
Award	Description	Winner	Season	References
Art Ross Trophy	Regular season scoring champion	Jamie Benn	2014–15	
Bill Masterton Memorial Trophy	Perseverance, sportsmanship and dedication to hockey	Al MacAdam	1979–80	
Calder Memorial Trophy	Rookie of the year	Danny Grant	1968–69	
Calder Memorial Trophy	Rookie of the year	Bobby Smith	1978–79	
Conn Smythe Trophy	Most valuable player of the playoffs	Joe Nieuwendyk	1998–99	
Frank J. Selke Trophy	Forward who best excels in the defensive aspect of the game	Jere Lehtinen	1997–98	
Frank J. Selke Trophy	Forward who best excels in the defensive aspect of the game	Jere Lehtinen	1998–99	
Frank J. Selke Trophy	Forward who best excels in the defensive aspect of the game	Jere Lehtinen	2002–03	
General Manager of the Year Award	Top general manager	Jim Nill	2022–23	
General Manager of the Year Award	Top general manager	Jim Nill	2023–24	
General Manager of the Year Award	Top general manager	Jim Nill	2024–25	
NHL Foundation Player Award	Community service	Marty Turco	2005–06	
Roger Crozier Saving Grace Award	Goaltender with the best save percentage	Ed Belfour	1999–2000	
Roger Crozier Saving Grace Award	Goaltender with the best save percentage	Marty Turco	2000–01	
Roger Crozier Saving Grace Award	Goaltender with the best save percentage	Marty Turco	2002–03	
William M. Jennings Trophy	Fewest goals given up in the regular season	Ed Belfour	1998–99	
William M. Jennings Trophy	Fewest goals given up in the regular season	Roman Turek	1998–99	

== All-Stars ==
=== NHL first and second team All-Stars ===
The NHL first and second team All-Stars are the top players at each position as voted on by the Professional Hockey Writers' Association.

Dallas Stars franchise players selected to the NHL First and Second Team All-Stars
Player	Position	Selections	Season	Team
Jamie Benn	Left wing	3	2013–14	1st
Jamie Benn	Left wing	3	2014–15	2nd
Jamie Benn	Left wing	3	2015–16	1st
Ben Bishop	Goaltender	1	2018–19	2nd
Derian Hatcher	Defense	1	2002–03	2nd
Mike Modano	Center	1	1999–2000	2nd
Jason Robertson	Left wing	2	2022–23	1st
Jason Robertson	Left wing	2	2025–26	1st
Marty Turco	Goaltender	1	2002–03	2nd

=== NHL All-Rookie Team ===
The NHL All-Rookie Team consists of the top rookies at each position as voted on by the Professional Hockey Writers' Association.

Dallas Stars franchise players selected to the NHL All-Rookie Team
Player	Position	Season
Miro Heiskanen	Defense	2018–19
Wyatt Johnston	Forward	2022–23
John Klingberg	Defense	2014–15
Mike Modano	Forward	1989–90
Jason Robertson	Forward	2020–21
Mike Smith	Goaltender	2006–07

=== All-Star Game selections ===
The National Hockey League All-Star Game is a mid-season exhibition game held annually between many of the top players of each season. Forty-four All-Star Games have been held since the Dallas Stars entered the NHL as the Minnesota North Stars in 1967, with at least one player chosen to represent the franchise in each year. The All-Star game has not been held in various years: 1979 and 1987 due to the 1979 Challenge Cup and Rendez-vous '87 series between the NHL and the Soviet national team, respectively, 1995, 2005, and 2013 as a result of labor stoppages, 2006, 2010, 2014 and 2026 because of the Winter Olympic Games, 2021 as a result of the COVID-19 pandemic, and 2025 when it was replaced by the 2025 4 Nations Face-Off. The franchise has hosted two of the games. The 25th took place at the Met Center, then known as the Metropolitan Sports Center, and the 55th took place at the American Airlines Center.

- † Selected by fan vote
- ‡ Selected by Commissioner

Dallas Stars franchise players and coaches selected to the All-Star Game
Game	Year	Name	Position	References
21st	1968	Dave Balon	Left wing	
22nd	1969	Danny Grant	Left wing	
22nd	1969	Claude Larose	Right wing	
22nd	1969	Danny O'Shea	Center	
22nd	1969	Elmer Vasko	Defense	
23rd	1970	Bill Goldsworthy	Right wing	
23rd	1970	Danny Grant	Left wing	
23rd	1970	Claude Larose	Right wing	
23rd	1970	Danny O'Shea	Center	
23rd	1970	J. P. Parise	Left wing	
24th	1971	Danny Grant	Left wing	
24th	1971	Ted Harris	Defense	
25th	1972	Bill Goldsworthy	Right wing	
25th	1972	Ted Harris	Defense	
25th	1972	Doug Mohns	Defense	
25th	1972	Gump Worsley	Goaltender	
26th	1973	Barry Gibbs	Defense	
26th	1973	J. P. Parise	Left wing	
27th	1974	Bill Goldsworthy	Right wing	
27th	1974	Dennis Hextall	Center	
28th	1975	Bill Goldsworthy (Did not play)	Right wing	
28th	1975	Dennis Hextall	Center	
29th	1976	Bill Goldsworthy	Right wing	
30th	1977	Tim Young	Center	
31st	1978	Roland Eriksson	Center	
32nd	1980	Craig Hartsburg	Defense	
32nd	1980	Gilles Meloche	Goaltender	
32nd	1980	Steve Payne	Left wing	
32nd	1980	Gary Sargent (Did not play)	Defense	
33rd	1981	Don Beaupre	Goaltender	
33rd	1981	Bobby Smith	Center	
34th	1982	Dino Ciccarelli	Right wing	
34th	1982	Craig Hartsburg	Defense	
34th	1982	Gilles Meloche	Goaltender	
34th	1982	Bobby Smith	Center	
34th	1982	Glen Sonmor	Coach	
35th	1983	Neal Broten	Center	
35th	1983	Dino Ciccarelli	Right wing	
35th	1983	Craig Hartsburg	Defense	
35th	1983	Tom McCarthy	Left wing	
36th	1984	Brian Bellows	Right wing	
36th	1984	Brad Maxwell	Defense	
37th	1985	Tony McKegney (Did not play)	Left wing	
37th	1985	Steve Payne	Left wing	
38th	1986	Neal Broten	Center	
39th	1988	Brian Bellows	Right wing	
40th	1989	Dino Ciccarelli	Right wing	
41st	1990	Mike Gartner	Right wing	
42nd	1991	Dave Gagner	Center	
42nd	1991	Bobby Smith‡	Center	
43rd	1992	Brian Bellows	Left wing	
43rd	1992	Mark Tinordi	Defense	
44th	1993	Jon Casey	Goaltender	
44th	1993	Mike Modano	Center	
45th	1994	Russ Courtnall	Right wing	
45th	1994	Mike Modano (Did not play)	Center	
46th	1996	Kevin Hatcher	Defense	
47th	1997	Derian Hatcher	Defense	
47th	1997	Ken Hitchcock	Coach	
47th	1997	Mike Modano (Did not play)	Center	
47th	1997	Andy Moog	Goaltender	
48th	1998	Ed Belfour	Goaltender	
48th	1998	Ken Hitchcock	Coach	
48th	1998	Jere Lehtinen	Right wing	
48th	1998	Mike Modano	Center	
48th	1998	Darryl Sydor	Defense	
48th	1998	Sergei Zubov	Defense	
49th	1999	Ed Belfour	Goaltender	
49th	1999	Ken Hitchcock	Coach	
49th	1999	Mike Modano	Center	
49th	1999	Darryl Sydor	Defense	
49th	1999	Sergei Zubov	Defense	
50th	2000	Mike Modano	Center	
50th	2000	Sergei Zubov	Defense	
51st	2001	Brett Hull	Right wing	
52nd	2002	Jere Lehtinen (Did not play)	Right wing	
53rd	2003	Bill Guerin†	Right wing	
53rd	2003	Mike Modano†	Center	
53rd	2003	Marty Turco	Goaltender	
54th	2004	Bill Guerin†	Right wing	
54th	2004	Mike Modano†	Center	
54th	2004	Marty Turco†	Goaltender	
55th	2007	Philippe Boucher	Defense	
55th	2007	Marty Turco	Goaltender	
56th	2008	Mike Ribeiro	Center	
56th	2008	Sergei Zubov (Did not play)	Defense	
57th	2009	Mike Modano	Center	
57th	2009	Stephane Robidas	Defense	
58th	2011	Loui Eriksson	Left wing	
58th	2011	Brad Richards	Center	
59th	2012	Jamie Benn	Left wing	
60th	2015	Tyler Seguin	Center	
61st	2016	Jamie Benn	Left wing	
61st	2016	Lindy Ruff	Coach	
61st	2016	Tyler Seguin	Center	
62nd	2017	Tyler Seguin	Center	
63rd	2018	John Klingberg	Defense	
63rd	2018	Tyler Seguin	Center	
64th	2019	Miro Heiskanen	Defense	
65th	2020	Tyler Seguin	Center	
66th	2022	Joe Pavelski	Center	
67th	2023	Peter DeBoer	Coach	
67th	2023	Jason Robertson	Left wing	
68th	2024	Jake Oettinger	Goaltender	

=== All-Star Game replacement events ===
Dallas Stars players and coaches selected to All-Star Game replacement events
Event	Year	Name	Position	References
4 Nations Face-Off	2025	Peter DeBoer (Canada)	Coach	
4 Nations Face-Off	2025	Mikael Granlund (Finland)	Left Wing	
4 Nations Face-Off	2025	Thomas Harley (Canada)	Defense	
4 Nations Face-Off	2025	Miro Heiskanen (Finland) (Did not play)	Defense	
4 Nations Face-Off	2025	Roope Hintz (Finland)	Center	
4 Nations Face-Off	2025	Esa Lindell (Finland)	Defense	
4 Nations Face-Off	2025	Jake Oettinger (United States)	Goaltender	

== Career achievements ==
=== Hockey Hall of Fame ===
The following is a list of Dallas Stars who have been enshrined in the Hockey Hall of Fame.

Dallas Stars franchise players and personnel inducted into the Hockey Hall of Fame
Individual	Category	Year inducted	Years with Stars franchise in category	References
Ed Belfour	Player	2011	1997–2002	
Leo Boivin	Player	1986	1969–1970	
Walter Bush	Builder	2000	1967–1984	
Guy Carbonneau	Player	2019	1995–2000	
Dino Ciccarelli	Player	2010	1980–1989	
Mike Gartner	Player	2001	1989–1990	
Ken Hitchcock	Builder	2023	1996-2002, 2017-2018	
Brett Hull	Player	2009	1998–2001	
Eric Lindros	Player	2016	2006–2007	
Sergei Makarov	Player	2016	1996	
John Mariucci	Builder	1985	1967–1987	
Mike Modano	Player	2014	1989–2010	
Larry Murphy	Player	2004	1989–1990	
Joe Nieuwendyk	Player	2011	1995–2002	
Pierre Turgeon	Player	2023	2001-2004	
Gump Worsley	Player	1980	1970–1974	
Sergei Zubov	Player	2019	1996–2009	

=== Foster Hewitt Memorial Award ===
Two members of the Dallas Stars organization have been honored with the Foster Hewitt Memorial Award. The award is presented by the Hockey Hall of Fame to members of the radio and television industry who make outstanding contributions to their profession and the game of ice hockey during their broadcasting career.

Members of the Dallas Stars franchise honored with the Foster Hewitt Memorial Award
Individual	Year honored	Years with franchise as broadcaster	References
Daryl Reaugh	2025	1996–present	
Al Shaver	1993	1967–1993	
Dave Strader	2017	2015–2017	

=== Lester Patrick Trophy ===
The Lester Patrick Trophy has been presented by the National Hockey League and USA Hockey since 1966 to honor a recipient's contribution to ice hockey in the United States. This list includes all personnel who have ever been employed by the Dallas Stars franchise in any capacity and have also received the Lester Patrick Trophy.

Members of the Dallas Stars franchise honored with the Lester Patrick Trophy
Individual	Year honored	Years with Stars franchise	References
Neal Broten	1998	1981–1995, 1997	
Walter Bush	1973	1967–1984	
John Mariucci	1977	1967–1987	
Lou Nanne	1989	1968–1988	

=== United States Hockey Hall of Fame ===
Members of the Dallas Stars franchise inducted into the United States Hockey Hall of Fame
Individual	Year inducted	Years with Stars franchise	References
Neal Broten	2000	1981–1995, 1997	
Walter Bush	1980	1967–1984	
Derian Hatcher	2010	1991–2003	
Kevin Hatcher	2010	1994–1996	
Brett Hull	2008	1998–2001	
John Mariucci	1973	1967–1987	
Mike Modano	2012	1989–2010	
Lou Nanne	1998	1968–1988	
Tim Thomas	2019	2014	
Ron Wilson	2017	1985–1988	
Scott Young	2017	2002–2004	

=== Retired numbers ===
The Dallas Stars have retired six of their jersey numbers. Two of them – Bill Goldsworthy's number 8 and Bill Masterton's number 19 – were retired while the team was still in Minnesota. Also out of circulation is the number 99 which was retired league-wide for Wayne Gretzky on February 6, 2000. Gretzky did not play for the Stars during his 20-year NHL career and no Stars player had ever worn the number 99 prior to its retirement.

Dallas Stars retired numbers
Number	Player	Position	Years with Stars franchise as a player	Date of retirement ceremony	References
7	Neal Broten	Center	1981–1995, 1997	February 7, 1998	
8	Bill Goldsworthy	Right wing	1967–1976	February 15, 1992	
9	Mike Modano	Center	1989–2010	March 8, 2014	
19	Bill Masterton	Center	1967–1968	January 17, 1987	
26	Jere Lehtinen	Right wing	1995–2010	November 24, 2017	
56	Sergei Zubov	Defense	1996–2009	January 28, 2022	

== Team awards ==
=== Mike Modano Trophy ===
The Mike Modano Trophy is an annual award given to the player who leads the team in scoring at the end of the regular season. It was introduced in 2014 and is named for Stars great Mike Modano.

Season	Winner
2013–14	Tyler Seguin
2014–15	Jamie Benn

Season	Winner
2015–16	Jamie Benn
2016–17	Tyler Seguin

Season	Winner
2017–18	Jamie Benn
2018–19	Tyler Seguin

=== Normandy Homes Star of the game Award ===
The Normandy Homes Star of the game Award is an annual award given to the player who earns the most points from Star of the game selections throughout the regular season.

Season	Winner
1977–78	Per-Olov Brasar
1978–79	Bobby Smith
1979–80	Al MacAdam
1980–81	Bobby Smith
1981–82	Neal Broten
1982–83	Brian Bellows
1983–84	Neal Broten
1984–85	Steve Payne
1985–86	Don Beaupre
1986–87	Dino Ciccarelli
1987–88	Dino Ciccarelli
1988–89	Dave Gagner
1989–90	Jon Casey
1990–91	Dave Gagner

Season	Winner
1991–92	Mike Modano
1992–93	Russ Courtnall
1993–94	Andy Moog
1994–95	Andy Moog
1995–96	Mike Modano
1996–97	Mike Modano
1997–98	Mike Modano
1998–99	Mike Modano
1999–00	Mike Modano
2000–01	Mike Modano
2001–02	Mike Modano
2002–03	Mike Modano
2002–03	Marty Turco
2003–04	Brenden Morrow

Season	Winner
2005–06	Jason Arnott
2006–07	Mike Modano
2007–08	Mike Ribeiro
2008–09	Marty Turco
2009–10	Brad Richards
2010–11	Brad Richards
2011–12	Kari Lehtonen
2012–13	Kari Lehtonen
2013–14	Jamie Benn
2014–15	Jamie Benn
2015–16	Jamie Benn
2016–17	Tyler Seguin
2017–18	Tyler Seguin
2018–19	Tyler Seguin

== See also ==
- List of National Hockey League awards
