= Ulf Samuelsson =

Swedish ice hockey player (born 1964)

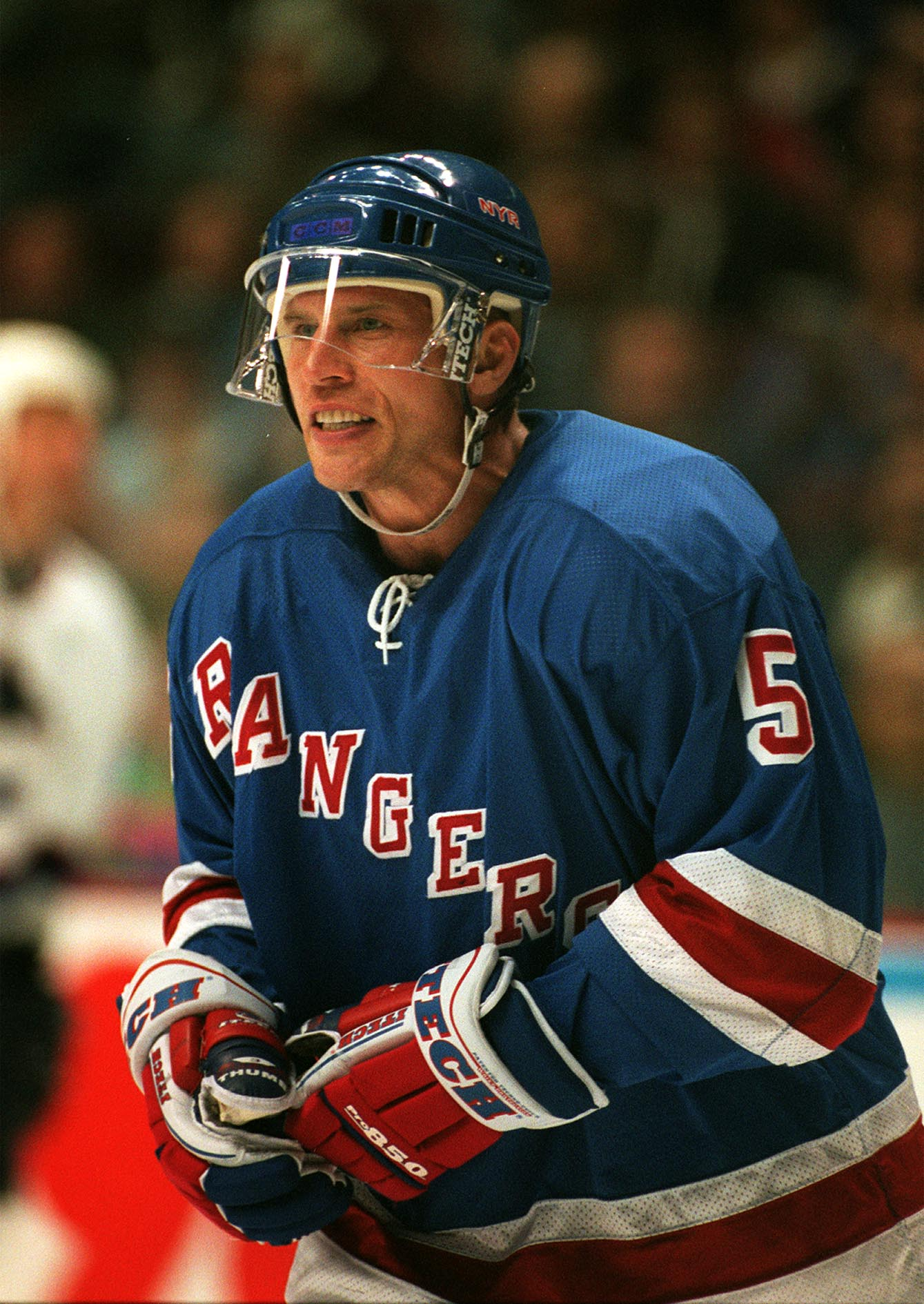
- Samuelsson with the New York Rangers in 1997
- Born: March 26, 1964 (age 62) Fagersta, Sweden
- Height: 6 ft 1 in (185 cm)
- Weight: 203 lb (92 kg; 14 st 7 lb)
- Position: Defence
- Shot: Left
- Played for: Hartford Whalers; Pittsburgh Penguins; New York Rangers; Detroit Red Wings; Philadelphia Flyers
- National team: Sweden
- NHL draft: 67th overall, 1982; Hartford Whalers
- Playing career: 1981–2000

Ulf Bo Samuelsson (born March 26, 1964) is a Swedish-American former professional ice hockey defenceman who formerly served as assistant coach of the Florida Panthers of the National Hockey League (NHL). He played several seasons in the NHL with the Hartford Whalers, Pittsburgh Penguins, New York Rangers, Detroit Red Wings, and Philadelphia Flyers. He is a two-time Stanley Cup champion, winning with the Penguins in 1991 and 1992, and the first European-born player to have 2,000 career penalty minutes.

During his playing career, Samuelsson was viewed by NHL stars as "the most hated man in hockey"; he was described to The New York Times as "the lowest form of human being" and someone whose play is all about "trying to hurt you and knock you out of the game". He is also infamous for his knee-to-knee hit on Boston Bruins Cam Neely during the 1991 playoffs that was a contributing factor in Neely's early retirement five years later. Throughout his NHL career, Samuelsson was heavily criticized by hockey commentator Don Cherry for his style of play.

== Playing career ==
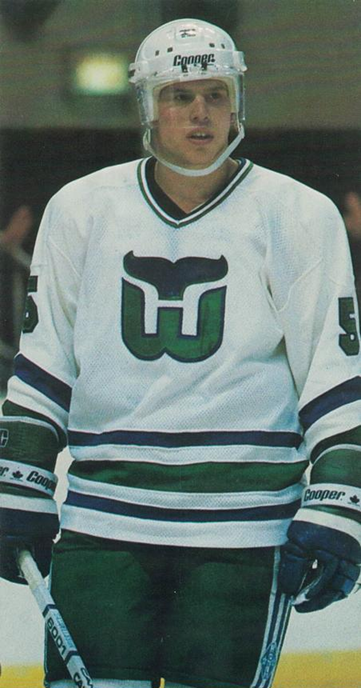
1986 photo of Samuelsson for Hartford Whalers

Samuelsson was selected 67th overall by the Hartford Whalers in the 1982 NHL entry draft. In February 1987, Samuelsson played in the "Rendez-vous '87" series as a member of the NHL All-Stars. The two-game series between the NHL All-Stars and the Soviet national team took place in Quebec City and replaced the NHL's mid-season all-star game for the 1986–87 season.

He was traded to the Pittsburgh Penguins along with Ron Francis in 1991 and was a member of Pittsburgh's Stanley Cup winning team in 1991 and 1992. He scored the 1991 Stanley Cup-winning goal in game six of the Final against the Minnesota North Stars, at 2:00 of the first period in what became an 8–0 blowout victory for Pittsburgh.

In game three versus the Boston Bruins during the Prince of Wales Conference final of the 1991 Stanley Cup Playoffs, Samuelsson hit Bruins' star forward Cam Neely with a knee-on-knee check that injured Neely and caused him to develop a condition called myositis ossificans, which ultimately ended his career.

As a member of the New York Rangers in 1995, Samuelsson was knocked unconscious by a punch to the face from Tie Domi of the Toronto Maple Leafs. Domi received an eight-game suspension and a fine for the incident. Domi insisted that Samuelsson provoked the punch by repeatedly calling him "dummy".

Samuelsson played 1,080 career NHL games, scoring 57 goals and 275 assists for 332 points. He accumulated 2,453 penalty minutes over the course of his career.

During the Nagano Olympics, he was ejected from the Swedish team when it was discovered that he had requested and received U.S. citizenship. His Swedish citizenship was revoked, and he was not allowed to play for his native country. Sweden appealed the ruling to the CAS, but their appeal was rejected. The entire ordeal was listed as the seventy-second most important international story by the IIHF in their centennial celebrations in 2008.

=== Transactions ===
- March 4, 1991 – traded by the Hartford Whalers, along with Ron Francis and Grant Jennings, to the Pittsburgh Penguins in exchange for John Cullen, Jeff Parker, and Zarley Zalapski
- August 31, 1995 – traded by the Pittsburgh Penguins, along with Luc Robitaille, to the New York Rangers in exchange for Petr Nedvěd and Sergei Zubov.
- March 23, 1999 – traded by the New York Rangers to the Detroit Red Wings in exchange for Detroit's 1999 second round draft choice and the Rangers' 1999 third round draft choice.
- June 25, 1999 – traded by the Detroit Red Wings to the Atlanta Thrashers in exchange for future considerations.
- October 19, 1999 – signed as a free agent by the Philadelphia Flyers.

== Personal life ==
Samuelsson is a resident of Scottsdale, Arizona. Samuelsson's sons, Philip, Henrik and Adam, are professional hockey players. His daughter, Victoria, played hockey at Penn State University.

== Coaching career ==
On May 2, 2011, Samuelsson accepted the head coaching position of Modo Hockey, a position he held for two seasons.

On May 31, 2016, it was announced that Samuelsson accepted a head coach position with the Charlotte Checkers of the American Hockey League. In 2017 Samuelsson was hired as an assistant coach with the Chicago Blackhawks of the National Hockey League. On November 6, 2018, he was fired along with head coach Joel Quenneville.

- 2003–04, head coach, Phantoms Ice Hockey Club squirt minor AAA
- 2004–05, assistant coach, Avon Old Farms School
- 2005–06, assistant coach, Hartford Wolf Pack
- 2006–11, assistant coach, Phoenix Coyotes
- 2011–13, head coach, Modo Hockey
- 2013–16, assistant coach, New York Rangers
- 2016–17, head coach, Charlotte Checkers
- 2017–18, assistant coach, Chicago Blackhawks
- 2019–20, pro scout, Seattle Kraken
- 2019–20, head coach, Leksands IF
- 2020–21, assistant coach, Florida Panthers

== Career statistics ==
=== Regular season and playoffs ===
			Regular season					Playoffs
Season	Team	League	GP	G	A	Pts	PIM	GP	G	A	Pts	PIM
1980–81	Fagersta AIK	SWE III	22	11	5	16	—	—	—	—	—	—
1981–82	Leksands IF	SEL	31	3	1	4	40	—	—	—	—	—
1982–83	Leksands IF	SEL	33	9	6	15	72	—	—	—	—	—
1983–84	Leksands IF	SEL	36	5	11	16	53	—	—	—	—	—
1984–85	Hartford Whalers	NHL	41	2	6	8	83	—	—	—	—	—
1984–85	Binghamton Whalers	AHL	36	5	11	16	92	—	—	—	—	—
1985–86	Hartford Whalers	NHL	80	5	19	24	174	10	1	2	3	38
1986–87	Hartford Whalers	NHL	78	2	31	33	162	5	0	1	1	41
1987–88	Hartford Whalers	NHL	76	8	33	41	159	5	0	0	0	8
1988–89	Hartford Whalers	NHL	71	9	26	35	181	4	0	2	2	4
1989–90	Hartford Whalers	NHL	55	2	11	13	177	7	1	0	1	2
1990–91	Hartford Whalers	NHL	62	3	18	21	174	—	—	—	—	—
1990–91	Pittsburgh Penguins	NHL	14	1	4	5	37	20	3	2	5	34
1991–92	Pittsburgh Penguins	NHL	62	1	14	15	206	21	0	2	2	39
1992–93	Pittsburgh Penguins	NHL	77	3	26	29	249	12	1	5	6	24
1993–94	Pittsburgh Penguins	NHL	80	5	24	29	199	6	0	1	1	18
1994–95	Leksands IF	SEL	2	0	0	0	8	—	—	—	—	—
1994–95	Pittsburgh Penguins	NHL	44	1	15	16	113	7	0	2	2	8
1995–96	New York Rangers	NHL	74	1	18	19	122	11	1	5	6	16
1996–97	New York Rangers	NHL	73	6	11	17	136	15	0	2	2	30
1997–98	New York Rangers	NHL	73	3	9	12	122	—	—	—	—	—
1998–99	New York Rangers	NHL	67	3	9	12	93	—	—	—	—	—
1998–99	Detroit Red Wings	NHL	4	0	0	0	6	9	0	3	3	10
1999–2000	Philadelphia Flyers	NHL	49	1	2	3	58	—	—	—	—	—
NHL totals			1,080	57	275	332	2,453	132	7	27	34	272
SEL totals			102	17	18	35	173	—	—	—	—	—

=== International ===
Year	Team	Event	Results	GP	G	A	Pts	PIM
1982	Sweden	EJC	1st place, gold medalist(s)	5	2	1	3	10
1982	Sweden	WJC	5th	7	1	2	3	18
1983	Sweden	WJC	4th	1	0	1	1	2
1984	Sweden	WJC	5th	7	1	4	5	10
1985	Sweden	WC	6th	9	1	2	3	22
1990	Sweden	WC	2nd place, silver medalist(s)	7	2	0	2	18
1991	Sweden	CC	SF	3	0	0	0	4
1998	Sweden	OG	5th	3	0	1	1	4
Junior totals				20	4	8	12	40
Senior totals				22	3	3	6	48

== Career achievements ==
- 2× Stanley Cup champion – 1991, 1992

== See also ==
- List of NHL players with 1,000 games played
- List of NHL players with 2,000 career penalty minutes
