= Jon Casey =

American ice hockey player (born 1962)

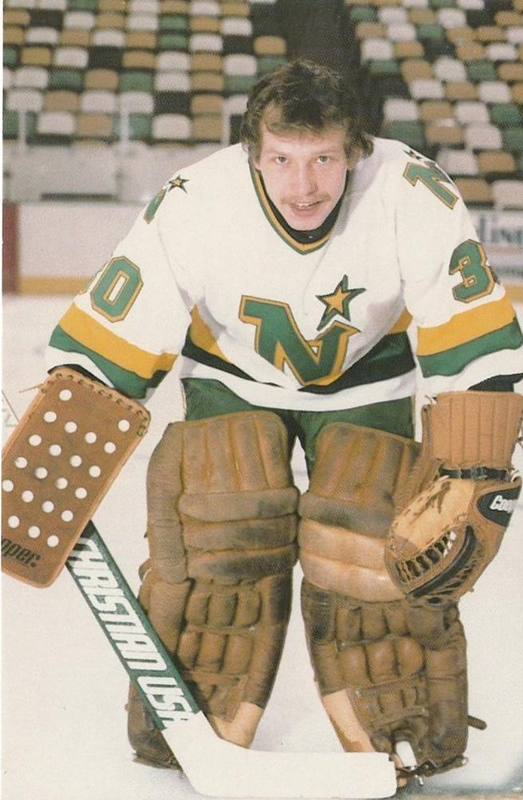
- Born: March 29, 1962 (age 64) Grand Rapids, Minnesota, U.S.
- Height: 5 ft 10 in (178 cm)
- Weight: 155 lb (70 kg; 11 st 1 lb)
- Position: Goaltender
- Caught: Left
- Played for: Minnesota North Stars; Boston Bruins; St. Louis Blues
- National team: United States
- NHL draft: Undrafted
- Playing career: 1984–1998

Jonathon James Casey (born March 29, 1962) is an American former professional ice hockey goaltender. He played in the National Hockey League with the Minnesota North Stars, Boston Bruins, and St. Louis Blues from 1984 to 1997.

== Early life ==
Jon Casey was born in Grand Rapids, Minnesota, to James and Colleen Casey. He is the second of four children. He played college hockey for the University of North Dakota from 1980 to 1984 and was part of two NCAA National Championship teams, in 1980 and 1982.

== Playing career ==
Casey spent most of his career with the Minnesota North Stars. In 1989-90, Casey tied Patrick Roy and Daren Puppa for the league lead in wins with 31. In 1993, he was a part of the Campbell Conference's roster at the 44th National Hockey League All-Star Game. Casey would also spend time with the Boston Bruins and St. Louis Blues.

Casey is best remembered for two famous moments when he was scored upon. The first, when Mario Lemieux split two North Stars defensemen (Neil Wilkinson and Shawn Chambers) and scored past Casey in game two of the 1991 Stanley Cup Final. The second came in the 1996 Stanley Cup playoffs when Steve Yzerman scored the game-winning goal in 2OT of game seven of the Western Conference semifinals with a long shot from the blue line.

== Career statistics ==
=== Regular season and playoffs ===
			Regular season									Playoffs
Season	Team	League	GP	W	L	T	MIN	GA	SO	GAA	SV%	GP	W	L	MIN	GA	SO	GAA	SV%
1978–79	Grand Rapids High School	HS-MN	—	—	—	—	—	—	—	—	—	—	—	—	—	—	—	—	—
1979–80	Grand Rapids High School	HS-MN	—	—	—	—	—	—	—	—	—	—	—	—	—	—	—	—	—
1980–81	University of North Dakota	WCHA	5	3	1	0	300	19	0	3.80	.872	—	—	—	—	—	—	—	—
1981–82	University of North Dakota	WCHA	18	15	3	0	1038	48	1	2.77	.908	—	—	—	—	—	—	—	—
1982–83	University of North Dakota	WCHA	17	9	6	2	1020	42	0	2.51	.923	—	—	—	—	—	—	—	—
1983–84	North Dakota Fighting Sioux	WCHA	37	25	10	2	2180	115	2	3.13	.910	—	—	—	—	—	—	—	—
1983–84	Minnesota North Stars	NHL	2	1	0	0	84	6	0	4.29	.898	—	—	—	—	—	—	—	—
1984–85	Baltimore Skipjacks	AHL	46	30	11	4	2646	116	4	2.63	.908	13	8	3	689	38	0	3.31	—
1985–86	Minnesota North Stars	NHL	26	11	11	1	1397	91	0	3.91	.884	—	—	—	—	—	—	—	—
1985–86	Springfield Indians	AHL	9	4	3	1	464	30	0	3.88	.879	—	—	—	—	—	—	—	—
1986–87	Springfield Indians	AHL	13	1	8	0	770	56	0	4.36	.873	—	—	—	—	—	—	—	—
1986–87	Indianapolis Checkers	IHL	31	14	15	0	1794	133	0	4.45	.865	—	—	—	—	—	—	—	—
1987–88	Minnesota North Stars	NHL	14	1	7	4	661	41	0	3.72	.882	—	—	—	—	—	—	—	—
1987–88	Kalamazoo Wings	IHL	42	24	13	5	2541	154	2	3.64	—	7	3	3	382	26	0	4.08	—
1988–89	Minnesota North Stars	NHL	55	18	17	12	2961	151	1	3.06	.900	4	1	3	211	16	0	4.54	.868
1989–90	Minnesota North Stars	NHL	61	31	22	4	3407	183	3	3.22	.896	7	3	4	415	21	1	3.04	.904
1990–91	Minnesota North Stars	NHL	55	21	20	11	3185	158	3	2.98	.891	23	14	7	1205	61	1	3.04	.893
1991–92	Minnesota North Stars	NHL	52	19	23	5	2911	165	2	3.40	.882	7	3	4	437	22	0	3.02	.902
1992–93	Minnesota North Stars	NHL	60	26	26	5	3476	193	3	3.33	.885	—	—	—	—	—	—	—	—
1993–94	Boston Bruins	NHL	57	30	15	9	3192	153	4	2.88	.881	11	5	6	698	34	0	2.92	.890
1994–95	St. Louis Blues	NHL	19	7	5	4	872	40	0	2.75	.900	2	0	1	30	2	0	4.00	.800
1995–96	St. Louis Blues	NHL	9	2	3	0	395	25	0	3.80	.861	12	6	6	747	36	1	2.89	.905
1995–96	Peoria Rivermen	IHL	43	21	19	2	2514	128	3	3.05	.887	—	—	—	—	—	—	—	—
1996–97	St. Louis Blues	NHL	15	3	8	0	707	40	0	3.39	.866	—	—	—	—	—	—	—	—
1996–97	Worcester IceCats	AHL	4	2	1	1	245	10	0	2.45	.916	—	—	—	—	—	—	—	—
1997–98	Kansas City Blades	IHL	24	9	13	2	1340	62	2	2.78	.903	—	—	—	—	—	—	—	—
NHL totals			425	170	157	55	23,252	1246	16	3.22	.888	66	32	31	3743	192	3	3.08	.895

=== International ===
Year	Team	Event	GP	W	L	T	MIN	GA	SO	GAA
1982	United States	WJC	5	1	2	0	219	15	0	4.11
1990	United States	WC	6	4	2	0	334	15	0	2.69
Junior totals			5	1	2	0	219	15	0	4.11
Senior totals			6	4	2	0	334	15	0	2.69

"Casey's stats". The Goaltender Home Page.

== Awards and honors ==
Award	Year
All-WCHA First Team	1981–82
All-WCHA Second Team	1982–83
All-WCHA First Team	1983–84
AHCA West First-Team All-American	1983–84

- Played in NHL All-Star Game (1993)
- AHL First All-Star Team (1985)
- Harry Hap Holmes Memorial Award (fewest goals against - AHL) (1985)
- Aldege "Baz" Bastien Memorial Award (Outstanding Goaltender - AHL) (1985)

== Transactions ==
- Signed as free agent by Minnesota North Stars, April 1, 1984.
- Traded by the Dallas Stars to the Boston Bruins for Andy Moog to complete deal in which Boston sends Gord Murphy to Dallas for future considerations, June 25, 1993.
- Signed as free agent by the St. Louis Blues, June 30, 1994.
- Retired from professional hockey, December 16, 1997.

Awards and achievements
Preceded by Brian Ford	Aldege "Baz" Bastien Memorial Award; 1984–85	Succeeded by Sam St. Laurent
