= Gaétan Duchesne =

Canadian ice hockey player (1962–2007)

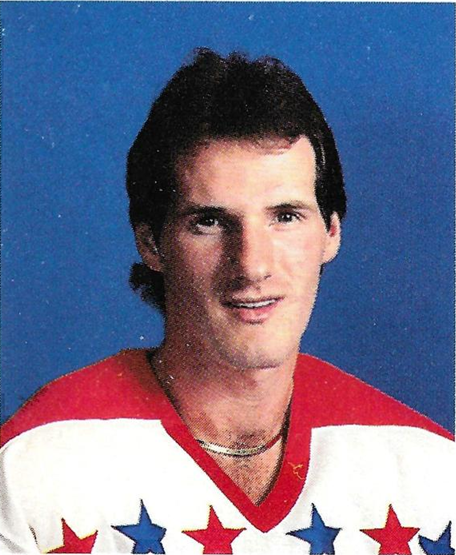
- Born: July 11, 1962 Quebec City, Quebec, Canada
- Died: April 16, 2007 (aged 44) Quebec City, Quebec, Canada
- Height: 6 ft 0 in (183 cm)
- Weight: 190 lb (86 kg; 13 st 8 lb)
- Position: Left wing
- Shot: Left
- Played for: Washington Capitals; Quebec Nordiques; Minnesota North Stars; San Jose Sharks; Florida Panthers
- NHL draft: 152nd overall, 1981; Washington Capitals
- Playing career: 1982–1998

Gaétan Joseph Pierre Duchesne (July 11, 1962 – April 16, 2007) was a Canadian professional ice hockey player. He played with the Washington Capitals, Minnesota North Stars, San Jose Sharks and Florida Panthers in the National Hockey League (NHL). He retired in 1995, then returned in 1996 and became a player-coach with the Quebec Rafales of the International Hockey League and later after retiring again in 1998, an assistant coach with the Quebec Remparts of the Quebec Major Junior Hockey League.

== Early life ==
Duchesne was born in Quebec City, Quebec. As a youth, he played in the 1974 and 1975 Quebec International Pee-Wee Hockey Tournaments with a minor ice hockey team from Quebec City.

== Playing career ==
Duchesne played in the Quebec Major Junior Hockey League (QMJHL) with the Quebec Remparts. He scored 36 goals and 109 points in 120 games in the QMJHL.

Duchesne was drafted by the Washington Capitals of the National Hockey League (NHL) in the eighth round, 152nd overall, of the 1981 NHL entry draft. He made the Capitals roster out of his first training camp, but was later returned to his junior team. He returned to the Capitals a few weeks later and became a key penalty killer for the Capitals alongside Doug Jarvis, only making one further appearance in the minors with the Hershey Bears of the American Hockey League. He played six seasons with the Capitals. Duchesne was a part of a number of records for the Capitals franchise. Duchesne started the fastest three-goal sequence in Capitals history, with 39 seconds lapsing between his goal and goals by Bob Carpenter and Mike Gartner in a 9–2 rout of the Edmonton Oilers on February 5, 1984. He scored a second goal in that game. He we the first scorer of the franchise's current record-fastest back-to-back goals, with only six seconds elapsing before a second goal was scored by Mark Taylor in a 4–2 win over the Chicago Black Hawks. In his final year with the Capitals in 1986–87, Duchesne set the franchise mark for the fastest goal to start a game with eight seconds, a mark matched by Alexander Semin in the 2009–10 season. He finished the season with 17 goals and 52 points.

Duchesne was dealt to the Quebec Nordiques on June 13, 1987 along with forward Alan Haworth and a first-round pick in the 1987 NHL entry draft for forward Dale Hunter and goaltender Clint Malarchuk. Though Washington's general manager, David Poile, did not want to give up Duchesne, a need for a goaltender after the departure of Bob Mason created an urgent need for the Capitals. In the 1988–89 season, Duchesne played well on a terrible team, posting an even plus/minus rating while scoring eight goals and 29 points in 70 games.

The Nordiques traded Duchesne to Minnesota North Stars on June 19, 1989 in exchange for forward Kevin Kaminski. Duchesne helped guide them to their improbable appearance in the 1991 Stanley Cup Final. He scored an insurance goal on Tom Barrasso in game three to help Minnesota take a 2–1 games lead over the Pittsburgh Penguins. However, the Penguins went on to defeat the North Stars four games to two and win the Stanley Cup. In his final season with Minnesota, he played in all 84 games, scoring 16 goals and 29 points.

Considered one of the NHL's top defensive forwards, Duchesne was acquired by the San Jose Sharks on June 20, 1993, for a sixth round pick in the 1993 NHL entry draft. In his first season with the Sharks, Duchesne played as one of their top penalty killers. The Sharks snuck into the 1994 Stanley Cup playoffs and upset the league's top team, the Detroit Red Wings in the first round, with Duchesne as one of the team's leaders. The Sharks were eliminated from the playoffs by the Toronto Maple Leafs in the following round. The following season, Duchesne registered his 1,000th game in the NHL on February 26, 1995, the second player to do so in a Sharks jersey. However, he was unhappy with the team, unable to come to terms on a new contract with the Sharks. At the season's trade deadline, he was dealt to the Florida Panthers for a sixth round pick in the 1995 NHL entry draft. He retired at the end of the season. In 1,028 NHL games, he scored 179 goals and 254 assists.

He was retired for one year, then returned to play in the International Hockey League (IHL) with the Quebec Rafales as a player-coach. He played 69 games over two seasons in the IHL.

Starting in 2008, the Capitals have awarded the Gaetan Duchesne Trophy to the best intra-squad team in training camp scrimmages.

== Coaching career ==
Duchesne was a player-assistant coach with the Quebec Rafales and an assistant coach with the Quebec Remparts of the QMJHL.

== Death ==
Duchesne died of a heart attack at the age of 44 in Quebec City.

== Personal life ==
In 2009, an arena in Les Saules, Quebec was renamed in his honour.

His son, Jeremy Duchesne, is a former goaltending prospect for the Philadelphia Flyers.

== Career statistics ==
Season	Team	League	GP	G	A	Pts	PIM	GP	G	A	Pts	PIM
1978–79	Ste-Foy Gouverneurs	QMAAA	25	3	12	15	—	—	—	—	—	—
1979–80	Quebec Remparts	QMJHL	46	9	28	37	22	5	0	2	2	9
1980–81	Quebec Remparts	QMJHL	72	27	45	72	63	7	1	4	5	6
1981–82	Quebec Remparts	QMJHL	2	0	0	0	0	—	—	—	—	—
1981–82	Washington Capitals	NHL	74	9	14	23	46	—	—	—	—	—
1982–83	Washington Capitals	NHL	77	18	19	37	52	4	1	1	2	4
1982–83	Hershey Bears	AHL	1	1	0	1	0	—	—	—	—	—
1983–84	Washington Capitals	NHL	79	17	19	36	29	8	2	1	3	2
1984–85	Washington Capitals	NHL	67	15	23	38	32	5	0	1	1	7
1985–86	Washington Capitals	NHL	80	11	28	39	39	9	4	3	7	12
1986–87	Washington Capitals	NHL	74	17	35	52	53	7	3	0	3	14
1987–88	Quebec Nordiques	NHL	80	24	23	47	83	—	—	—	—	—
1988–89	Quebec Nordiques	NHL	70	8	21	29	56	—	—	—	—	—
1989–90	Minnesota North Stars	NHL	72	12	8	20	33	7	0	0	0	6
1990–91	Minnesota North Stars	NHL	68	9	9	18	18	23	2	3	5	34
1991–92	Minnesota North Stars	NHL	73	8	15	23	102	7	1	0	1	6
1992–93	Minnesota North Stars	NHL	84	16	13	29	30	—	—	—	—	—
1993–94	San Jose Sharks	NHL	84	12	18	30	28	14	1	4	5	12
1994–95	San Jose Sharks	NHL	33	2	7	9	16	—	—	—	—	—
1994–95	Florida Panthers	NHL	13	1	2	3	0	—	—	—	—	—
NHL totals			1,028	179	254	433	617	84	14	13	27	97

== See also ==
- List of NHL players with 1,000 games played
