= Peter Taglianetti =

American ice hockey player

- Born: August 15, 1963 (age 63) Framingham, Massachusetts, U.S.
- Height: 6 ft 2 in (188 cm)
- Weight: 200 lb (91 kg; 14 st 4 lb)
- Position: Defense
- Shot: Left
- Played for: Pittsburgh Penguins; Tampa Bay Lightning; Minnesota North Stars; Winnipeg Jets
- NHL draft: 43rd overall, 1983; Winnipeg Jets
- Playing career: 1987–1996

Peter Anthony Taglianetti (born August 15, 1963) is an American former NHL defenseman and former college hockey coach at Washington & Jefferson College. With the Pittsburgh Penguins, he won the Stanley Cup in 1991 and 1992. Taglianetti is also a former Pittsburgh Penguins broadcaster.

== Career statistics ==
=== Regular season and playoffs ===
			Regular season					Playoffs
Season	Team	League	GP	G	A	Pts	PIM	GP	G	A	Pts	PIM
1981–82	Providence College	ECAC	2	0	0	0	2	—	—	—	—	—
1982–83	Providence College	ECAC	43	4	17	21	68	—	—	—	—	—
1983–84	Providence College	ECAC	30	4	25	29	68	—	—	—	—	—
1984–85	Providence College	HE	43	8	21	29	114	—	—	—	—	—
1984–85	Winnipeg Jets	NHL	1	0	0	0	0	1	0	0	0	0
1985–86	Sherbrooke Canadiens	AHL	24	1	8	9	75	—	—	—	—	—
1985–86	Winnipeg Jets	NHL	18	0	0	0	48	3	0	0	0	2
1986–87	Sherbrooke Canadiens	AHL	54	5	14	19	104	10	2	5	7	25
1986–87	Winnipeg Jets	NHL	3	0	0	0	12	—	—	—	—	—
1987–88	Winnipeg Jets	NHL	70	6	17	23	182	5	1	1	2	12
1988–89	Winnipeg Jets	NHL	66	1	14	15	226	—	—	—	—	—
1989–90	Moncton Hawks	AHL	3	0	2	2	2	—	—	—	—	—
1989–90	Winnipeg Jets	NHL	49	3	6	9	136	5	0	0	0	6
1990–91	Minnesota North Stars	NHL	16	0	1	1	14	—	—	—	—	—
1990–91	Pittsburgh Penguins	NHL	39	3	8	11	93	19	0	3	3	49
1991–92	Pittsburgh Penguins	NHL	44	1	3	4	57	—	—	—	—	—
1992–93	Tampa Bay Lightning	NHL	61	1	8	9	150	—	—	—	—	—
1992–93	Pittsburgh Penguins	NHL	11	1	4	5	34	11	1	2	3	16
1993–94	Pittsburgh Penguins	NHL	60	2	12	14	142	5	0	2	2	16
1994–95	Cleveland Lumberjacks	IHL	3	0	1	1	7	4	0	0	0	19
1994–95	Pittsburgh Penguins	NHL	13	0	1	1	12	4	0	0	0	2
1995–96	Providence Bruins	AHL	34	0	6	6	44	—	—	—	—	—
NHL totals			451	18	74	92	1106	53	2	8	10	103

== Awards and honors ==
Award	Year
All-ECAC Hockey Second Team	1983–84
AHCA East Second-Team All-American	1983–84
All-Hockey East First Team	1984–85
AHCA East Second-Team All-American	1984–85
Hockey East All-Tournament Team	1985
Stanley Cup Championship (Pittsburgh)	1991, 1992

== Personal ==
Taglianetti married Alison Casey and had four sons and a daughter with her. The couple divorced in 1999. Twin sons, Andrew and Jon, played for Pittsburgh Panthers football; Andrew from 2008 until 2012 and Jon for three games in 2009. Both boys also worked as stick boys for the Pittsburgh Penguins.

In 2013 Taglianetti married Vonda Wright, an orthopaedic sports surgeon who has served as the head football doctor for the NCAA Division I University of Pittsburgh Panther football team. Together they share a blended family of six.

Taglianetti was one of several professional athletes who participated in the Yokozuna Bodyslam Challenge on board the USS Intrepid on July 4, 1993. Taglianetti attempted to lift the 568 lb. Yokozuna, but could not get the wrestler to leave his feet.
