= Brian Glynn =

Canadian ice hockey player (born 1967)

- Born: November 23, 1967 (age 58) Iserlohn, West Germany
- Height: 6 ft 4 in (193 cm)
- Weight: 215 lb (98 kg; 15 st 5 lb)
- Position: Defence
- Shot: Left
- Played for: Calgary Flames; Minnesota North Stars; Edmonton Oilers; Ottawa Senators; Vancouver Canucks; Hartford Whalers; Kölner Haie
- NHL draft: 37th overall, 1986; Calgary Flames
- Playing career: 1987–1998

Brian Thomas Glynn (born November 23, 1967) is a German-born Canadian former professional ice hockey defenceman who played six seasons in the National Hockey League (NHL). A second round selection of the Calgary Flames, 37th overall at the 1986 NHL entry draft, Glynn played with the Flames, Minnesota North Stars, Edmonton Oilers, Ottawa Senators, Vancouver Canucks and Hartford Whalers during his NHL career before playing one season in the Deutsche Eishockey Liga (DEL) for Kölner Haie.

== Playing career ==
Glynn was born in Iserlohn, West Germany while his father served in the armed forces but grew up in Saskatchewan. He played junior hockey between 1983 and 1987 with the Melville Millionaires of the Saskatchewan Junior Hockey League (SJHL) and Saskatoon Blades of the Western Hockey League (WHL). He was selected in the second round, 37th overall, by the Calgary Flames at the 1986 NHL entry draft.

Starting his professional career in 1987–88, Glynn made his NHL debut on October 8, 1987, and scored a goal against goaltender Glen Hanlon of the Detroit Red Wings. He appeared in 67 games as a rookie and scored 19 points. His play diminished in 1988–89, resulting in Glynn appearing in only nine games with the Flames and being demoted to the Salt Lake Golden Eagles of the International Hockey League (IHL). He spent virtually the entire 1989–90 season with Salt Lake where he scored 61 points in 80 games. Glynn was named a first team all-start and won the Governor's Trophy as the IHL's top defenceman.

Glynn began the 1990–91 season with Salt Lake, but joined the Minnesota North Stars on October 26, 1990, after Calgary traded him in exchange for Frank Musil. Glynn appeared in 66 regular season games with Minnesota, and in 23 playoff games as the North Stars made a Cinderella run to the 1991 Stanley Cup Final before losing to the Pittsburgh Penguins. A journeyman defenceman, Glynn frequently changed teams over the next several seasons and ultimately was a member of seven franchises over his ten-year career. Minnesota traded him to the Edmonton Oilers on January 21, 1992, for David Shaw. After a year and a half in Edmonton, he was sent to the Ottawa Senators for a draft pick on September 15, 1993. But after only a half-season with the Senators, he was claimed on waivers by the Vancouver Canucks. Glynn played only 16 regular season games for Vancouver, but appeared in 17 playoff games as the Canucks reached, and lost, the 1994 Stanley Cup Final.

Glynn then spent two seasons with the Hartford Whalers and scored 11 points in 97 games combined between the 1994–95 and 1995–96 seasons. After appearing in one game for the Whalers in 1996–97 season, Glynn was involved in a significant trade between Hartford and the Detroit Red Wings. Glynn was included in the October 9, 1996, trade that saw the Whalers also trade their captain, Brendan Shanahan, to Detroit for Paul Coffey, Keith Primeau and a first round draft pick. Glynn never played with Detroit as he was assigned to the IHL's San Antonio Dragons where he played 62 games. Glynn played a final professional season in 1997–98 in Germany, where he suited up for Kölner Haie of the Deutsche Eishockey Liga (DEL).

== Career statistics ==
=== Regular season and playoffs ===
			Regular season					Playoffs
Season	Team	League	GP	G	A	Pts	PIM	GP	G	A	Pts	PIM
1983–84	Melville Millionaires	SJHL	19	1	2	3	12	—	—	—	—	—
1984–85	Melville Millionaires	SJHL	49	13	16	29	154	—	—	—	—	—
1984–85	Saskatoon Blades	WHL	12	1	0	1	2	3	0	0	0	0
1985–86	Saskatoon Blades	WHL	66	7	25	32	131	13	0	3	3	30
1986–87	Saskatoon Blades	WHL	44	2	26	28	163	11	1	3	4	19
1987–88	Calgary Flames	NHL	67	5	14	19	87	1	0	0	0	0
1988–89	Salt Lake Golden Eagles	IHL	31	3	10	13	105	14	3	7	10	31
1988–89	Calgary Flames	NHL	9	0	1	1	19	—	—	—	—	—
1989–90	Salt Lake Golden Eagles	IHL	80	17	44	61	164	—	—	—	—	—
1989–90	Calgary Flames	NHL	1	0	0	0	0	—	—	—	—	—
1990–91	Salt Lake Golden Eagles	IHL	8	1	3	4	18	—	—	—	—	—
1990–91	Minnesota North Stars	NHL	66	8	11	19	83	23	2	6	8	18
1991–92	Minnesota North Stars	NHL	37	2	12	14	24	—	—	—	—	—
1991–92	Edmonton Oilers	NHL	25	2	6	8	6	16	4	1	5	12
1992–93	Edmonton Oilers	NHL	64	4	12	16	60	—	—	—	—	—
1993–94	Ottawa Senators	NHL	48	2	13	15	41	—	—	—	—	—
1993–94	Vancouver Canucks	NHL	16	0	0	0	12	17	0	3	3	10
1994–95	Hartford Whalers	NHL	43	1	6	7	32	—	—	—	—	—
1995–96	Hartford Whalers	NHL	54	0	4	4	44	—	—	—	—	—
1996–97	San Antonio Dragons	IHL	62	13	11	24	46	9	2	6	8	4
1996–97	Hartford Whalers	NHL	1	1	0	1	2	—	—	—	—	—
1997–98	Kölner Haie	DEL	48	10	12	22	61	—	—	—	—	—
NHL totals			431	25	79	104	410	57	6	10	16	40
