= Chris Dahlquist =

American ice hockey player (born 1962)

- Born: December 14, 1962 (age 63) Fridley, Minnesota, U.S.
- Height: 6 ft 1 in (185 cm)
- Weight: 195 lb (88 kg; 13 st 13 lb)
- Position: Defense
- Shot: Left
- Played for: Pittsburgh Penguins; Minnesota North Stars; Calgary Flames; Ottawa Senators
- National team: United States
- NHL draft: Undrafted
- Playing career: 1985–1997

Christopher Charles Dahlquist (born December 14, 1962) is an American former professional ice hockey player. Dahlquist played for four National Hockey League (NHL) teams during his career.

== Personal life ==
He played four seasons for Lake Superior State University in the NCAA. Dahlquist and his wife Jeanie reside in Eden Prairie, Minnesota. The couple have two children, Chad and Charly.

== Playing career ==
Dahlquist started his National Hockey League career with the Pittsburgh Penguins in 1985. He also played for the Minnesota North Stars and Calgary Flames. After the 1994 season he moved to the Ottawa Senators for the next two seasons. He played 1996–97 in the IHL with the Las Vegas Thunder before retiring from hockey. Dahlquist played a total of 532 regular season games, scoring 19 goals and 71 assists for 90 points, collecting 488 penalty minutes.

== Career statistics ==
			Regular Season					Playoffs
Season	Team	League	GP	G	A	Pts	PIM	GP	G	A	Pts	PIM
1981–82	Lake Superior State University	CCHA	39	4	10	14	62	—	—	—	—	—
1982–83	Lake Superior State University	CCHA	35	0	12	12	63	—	—	—	—	—
1983–84	Lake Superior State University	CCHA	40	4	19	23	76	—	—	—	—	—
1984–85	Lake Superior State University	CCHA	44	4	15	19	112	—	—	—	—	—
1985–86	Baltimore Skipjacks	AHL	65	4	21	25	64	—	—	—	—	—
1985–86	Pittsburgh Penguins	NHL	5	1	2	3	2	—	—	—	—	—
1986–87	Baltimore Skipjacks	AHL	51	1	16	17	50	—	—	—	—	—
1986–87	Pittsburgh Penguins	NHL	19	0	1	1	20	—	—	—	—	—
1987–88	Pittsburgh Penguins	NHL	44	3	6	9	69	—	—	—	—	—
1988–89	Pittsburgh Penguins	NHL	43	1	5	6	42	2	0	0	0	0
1988–89	Muskegon Lumberjacks	IHL	10	3	6	9	14	—	—	—	—	—
1989–90	Pittsburgh Penguins	NHL	62	4	10	14	56	—	—	—	—	—
1989–90	Muskegon Lumberjacks	IHL	6	1	1	2	8	—	—	—	—	—
1990–91	Pittsburgh Penguins	NHL	22	1	2	3	30	—	—	—	—	—
1990–91	Minnesota North Stars	NHL	42	2	6	8	33	23	1	6	7	20
1991–92	Minnesota North Stars	NHL	74	1	13	14	68	7	0	0	0	6
1992–93	Calgary Flames	NHL	74	3	7	10	66	6	3	1	4	4
1993–94	Calgary Flames	NHL	77	1	11	12	52	1	0	0	0	0
1994–95	Ottawa Senators	NHL	46	1	7	8	36	—	—	—	—	—
1995–96	Ottawa Senators	NHL	24	1	1	2	14	—	—	—	—	—
1995–96	Cincinnati Cyclones	IHL	38	4	8	12	50	2	1	3	4	0
1996–97	Las Vegas Thunder	IHL	18	1	4	5	26	—	—	—	—	—
NHL totals			532	19	71	90	488	39	4	7	11	30
