= Mark Tinordi =

Canadian ice hockey player

- Born: May 9, 1966 (age 60) Red Deer, Alberta, Canada
- Height: 6 ft 4 in (193 cm)
- Weight: 213 lb (97 kg; 15 st 3 lb)
- Position: Defenceman
- Shot: Left
- Played for: New York Rangers; Minnesota North Stars; Dallas Stars; Washington Capitals
- National team: Canada
- Playing career: 1987–1999
Medal record
Representing Canada
Ice hockey
Canada Cup
Gold medal – first place	1991 Canada

Mark Douglas Tinordi (born May 9, 1966) is a Canadian former professional ice hockey defenceman who played in the National Hockey League (NHL) for 12 seasons between 1987–88 and 1998–99. Tinordi became the coach of the Washington Junior Nationals in the 2006–07 season; he is also the director of the Washington Junior Nationals College Development Program.

== Playing career ==
Mark Tinordi was signed as an undrafted free agent by the New York Rangers on January 4, 1987. He was traded in early 1988 to the Minnesota North Stars in a multi-player deal. Three seasons later in 1991, his hard-nosed style helped guide the North Stars to their improbable playoff run to the 1991 Stanley Cup Final, where they eventually lost to the Pittsburgh Penguins. Named the captain of the team the following season, Tinordi remained in that role when the team became the Dallas Stars prior to the 1993–94 NHL season. After playing in Dallas for one season, he was traded to the Washington Capitals in the deal that sent Kevin Hatcher to the Stars. Tinordi played the final five seasons of his career with the Capitals, which included an appearance in the 1998 Stanley Cup Final. He was selected by the Atlanta Thrashers in the 1999 NHL Expansion Draft, but due to injuries he retired prior to the 1999–2000 NHL season without playing for them.

He played 663 career NHL games, scoring 52 goals and 148 assists for 200 points and 1,514 penalty minutes. His best statistical season was the 1992–93 NHL season, when he set career highs with 15 goals and 42 points.

== Personal life ==
Tinordi and his first wife Lorene have four children, Matthew, Jarred, Natalie, and Jacob. Jarred is a professional ice hockey defenseman who last played in the NHL for the Chicago Blackhawks.

Tinordi resides in Millersville, Maryland with his second wife, Jessica.

In 2012, Tinordi became owner of a bar and restaurant in Severna Park, Maryland called Rods and Rides. Its name was later changed to the Severna Park Taphouse.

== Career statistics ==
=== Regular season and playoffs ===
			Regular Season					Playoffs
Season	Team	League	GP	G	A	Pts	PIM	GP	G	A	Pts	PIM
1982–83	Lethbridge Broncos	WHL	64	0	4	4	50	20	1	1	2	6
1983–84	Lethbridge Broncos	WHL	72	5	14	19	53	5	1	0	1	7
1984–85	Lethbridge Broncos	WHL	58	10	15	25	134	4	0	2	2	12
1985–86	Lethbridge Broncos	WHL	58	8	30	38	139	8	1	3	4	15
1986–87	Calgary Wranglers	WHL	61	29	37	66	148	—	—	—	—	—
1986–87	New Haven Nighthawks	AHL	2	0	0	0	2	2	0	0	0	0
1987–88	New York Rangers	NHL	24	1	2	3	50	—	—	—	—	—
1987–88	Colorado Rangers	IHL	41	8	19	27	150	11	1	5	6	31
1988–89	Kalamazoo Wings	IHL	10	0	0	0	35	—	—	—	—	—
1988–89	Minnesota North Stars	NHL	47	2	3	5	107	5	0	0	0	0
1989–90	Minnesota North Stars	NHL	66	3	7	10	240	7	0	1	1	16
1990–91	Minnesota North Stars	NHL	69	5	27	32	189	23	5	6	11	78
1991–92	Minnesota North Stars	NHL	63	4	24	28	179	7	1	2	3	11
1992–93	Minnesota North Stars	NHL	69	15	27	42	157	—	—	—	—	—
1993–94	Dallas Stars	NHL	61	6	18	24	143	—	—	—	—	—
1994–95	Washington Capitals	NHL	42	3	9	12	71	1	0	0	0	2
1995–96	Washington Capitals	NHL	71	3	10	13	113	6	0	0	0	16
1996–97	Washington Capitals	NHL	56	2	6	8	118	—	—	—	—	—
1997–98	Washington Capitals	NHL	47	8	9	17	39	21	1	2	3	42
1998–99	Washington Capitals	NHL	48	0	6	6	108	—	—	—	—	—
NHL totals			663	52	148	200	1514	70	7	11	18	165

=== International ===
Year	Team	Event	Result	GP	G	A	Pts	PIM
1991	Canada	CC	1st place, gold medalist(s)	3	0	0	0	2

== Awards ==
- WHL East First All-Star Team – 1987

Preceded by Curt Giles	Minnesota North Stars/Dallas Stars captain 1991–95	Succeeded by Neal Broten
