= Grant Jennings =

Canadian ice hockey player (born 1965)

- Born: May 5, 1965 (age 61) Hudson Bay, Saskatchewan, Canada
- Height: 6 ft 3 in (191 cm)
- Weight: 210 lb (95 kg; 15 st 0 lb)
- Position: Defence
- Shot: Left
- Played for: Washington Capitals; Hartford Whalers; Pittsburgh Penguins; Toronto Maple Leafs; Buffalo Sabres
- NHL draft: Undrafted
- Playing career: 1985–1998

Grant Curtis Jennings (born May 5, 1965) is a Canadian former National Hockey League (NHL) defenceman.

== Career ==
Jennings played Midget AAA for the Notre Dame Hounds of Wilcox, Saskatchewan, and then moved onto play Junior A hockey in the Saskatchewan Junior Hockey League for the Humboldt Broncos and in the Western Hockey League for the Saskatoon Blades. He was never selected in the NHL entry draft; he was signed as a free agent by the Washington Capitals on June 25, 1985. In his NHL career, he played for the Capitals, the Hartford Whalers, the Pittsburgh Penguins (with whom he won the Stanley Cup in 1991 and 1992), the Toronto Maple Leafs, and the Buffalo Sabres.

Jennings appeared in 389 NHL games, scoring 14 goals and adding 43 assists. He also appeared in 54 Stanley Cup playoff games, scoring two goals and recording one assist. He is currently working for ConocoPhillips as an aircraft mechanic in Alaska. He attended the Pittsburgh Institute of Aeronautics in West Mifflin, Pennsylvania.

== Career statistics ==
=== Regular season and playoffs ===
			Regular season					Playoffs
Season	Team	League	GP	G	A	Pts	PIM	GP	G	A	Pts	PIM
1983–84	Saskatoon Blades	WHL	64	5	13	18	102	—	—	—	—	—
1984–85	Saskatoon Blades	WHL	47	10	24	34	134	2	1	0	1	12
1985–86	Binghamton Whalers	AHL	51	0	4	4	109	—	—	—	—	—
1986–87	Fort Wayne Komets	IHL	3	0	0	0	0	—	—	—	—	—
1986–87	Binghamton Whalers	AHL	47	1	5	6	125	13	0	2	2	17
1987–88	Binghamton Whalers	AHL	56	2	12	14	195	3	1	0	1	15
1987–88	Washington Capitals	NHL	—	—	—	—	—	1	0	0	0	0
1988–89	Hartford Whalers	NHL	55	3	10	13	159	4	1	0	1	17
1988–89	Binghamton Whalers	AHL	2	0	0	0	2	—	—	—	—	—
1989–90	Hartford Whalers	NHL	64	3	6	9	171	7	0	0	0	17
1990–91	Hartford Whalers	NHL	44	1	4	5	82	—	—	—	—	—
1990–91	Pittsburgh Penguins	NHL	13	1	3	4	26	13	1	1	2	16
1991–92	Pittsburgh Penguins	NHL	53	4	5	9	104	10	0	0	0	12
1992–93	Pittsburgh Penguins	NHL	58	0	5	5	65	12	0	0	0	8
1993–94	Pittsburgh Penguins	NHL	61	2	4	6	126	3	0	0	0	2
1994–95	Toronto Maple Leafs	NHL	10	0	2	2	7	4	0	0	0	0
1994–95	Pittsburgh Penguins	NHL	25	0	4	4	36	—	—	—	—	—
1995–96	Buffalo Sabres	NHL	6	0	0	0	28	—	—	—	—	—
1995–96	Rochester Americans	AHL	9	0	1	1	28	—	—	—	—	—
1995–96	Atlanta Knights	IHL	3	0	0	0	19	3	0	0	0	20
1996–97	Quebec Rafales	IHL	42	2	10	12	79	—	—	—	—	—
1997–98	San Antonio Dragons	IHL	44	1	4	5	116	—	—	—	—	—
NHL totals			389	14	43	57	804	54	2	1	3	72
