= Dave Gagner =

Canadian ice hockey player (born 1964)

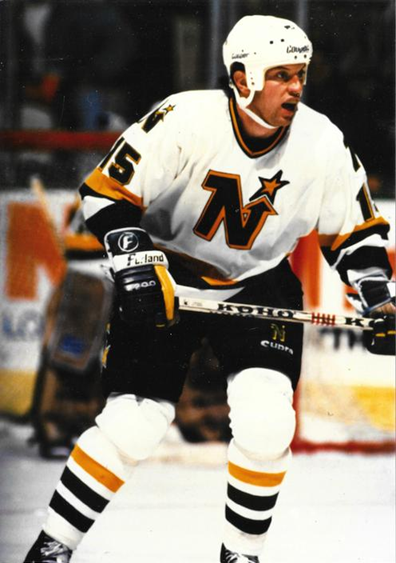
- Born: December 11, 1964 (age 61) Chatham, Ontario, Canada
- Height: 5 ft 10 in (178 cm)
- Weight: 188 lb (85 kg; 13 st 6 lb)
- Position: Centre
- Shot: Left
- Played for: New York Rangers; Minnesota North Stars; Dallas Stars; Toronto Maple Leafs; Calgary Flames; Florida Panthers; Vancouver Canucks
- National team: Canada
- NHL draft: 12th overall, 1983; New York Rangers
- Playing career: 1984–1999

David Rene Gagner (born December 11, 1964) is a Canadian former professional ice hockey player and current agency executive. He played as a Centre for 15 seasons in the National Hockey League (NHL), playing for the New York Rangers, Minnesota North Stars, Dallas Stars, Toronto Maple Leafs, Calgary Flames, Florida Panthers, and Vancouver Canucks. A one-time All-Star, Gagner had his best success with the North Stars, where he played for nine seasons and recorded six 30-goal seasons.

After his playing days ended, he became a businessman and hockey executive. From 2008 to 2013, he served with the Canucks as their Director of Player Development. He left to become involved in player agencies.

== Playing career ==
Dave Gagner spent two full seasons with the OHL's Brantford Alexanders. In 1982–83 he registered 55 goals and 121 points in 70 games, catching the attention of NHL scouts. The same season he was named to the OHL Second All-Star Team.

He was selected in the first round of the 1983 NHL entry draft (12th overall) by the New York Rangers and bounced back and forth between New York and their American Hockey League farm team, the New Haven Nighthawks over the next several seasons. He remained with the Rangers' organization until 1987 but was never able to completely get over the hump and earn a full-time roster spot, largely due to his being considered too small for an NHL forward.

His career took off when he was traded to the Minnesota North Stars in 1987. Though initially spending time with Minnesota's farm team in Kalamazoo, Gagner broke out in 1989–90 with 40 goals and was in the NHL to stay. In his best season (1990–91), Gagner recorded 82 points in 73 games. He remained with the Stars when they moved to Dallas, until he was traded to Toronto on January 29, 1996. His stay in Toronto would last only 28 games before he was again traded, this time to Calgary, where he would spend the entire 1996–97 season, scoring a very respectable 27 goals and 60 points in 82 games.

In the summer of 1997 Gagner was on the move again, signing a free agent contract with the Florida Panthers. Gagner would spend a season and a half in Florida before being involved in a blockbuster trade on January 17, 1999. Gagner, along with Ed Jovanovski, Mike Brown, Kevin Weekes and Florida's 1st round choice (Nathan Smith) in the 2000 NHL entry draft were dealt to Vancouver in exchange for superstar Pavel Bure, Bret Hedican, Brad Ference and Vancouver's 3rd round choice (Robert Fried) 2000 NHL Entry Draft.

Gagner would finish the 1998–99 season with the Canucks before officially announcing his retirement on September 29, 1999, after 15 years in the NHL. He finished with 719 points in 946 NHL regular season games.

== Post-playing career ==
In March 2000, Gagner founded Custom Ice Inc., a company that manufactures permanent and portable ice skating rinks.

In 2001, Brad Grant sold the Milton Icehawks to an Oakville trio that consisted of ex-NHLer Gagner, Mario Forgione who owned the Mississauga IceDogs at the time and was an automotive parts manufacturing president, and wine distillery consultant Ken Chase.

In August 2006, it was announced that Gagner would serve as assistant coach of the London Knights of the Ontario Hockey League; his son, Sam, also played for the team. His daughter, Jessica Gagner plays hockey for the Dartmouth Big Green women's ice hockey program. Dave spent the 2006–07 and 2007–08 seasons with the Knights, and also opened a training centre in London to work with young prospects.

In June 2008, Gagner's former agent Mike Gillis, who had recently been named General Manager of the Vancouver Canucks, hired Gagner as the team's Director of Player Development. Gagner replaced Canucks' legend Stan Smyl, who had been named the team's new Director of Collegiate Scouting. On September 3, 2013, Gagner left the Canucks to work with the Orr Hockey Group player agency as their leader of the player-development group.. Currently, he serves as vice president of The.Team as a certified player agent.

== Career statistics ==
=== Regular season and playoffs ===
| | | | Regular season | | | | | Playoffs |
| Season | Team | League | GP | G | A | Pts | PIM | GP | G | A | Pts | PIM |
|---|---|---|---|---|---|---|---|---|---|---|---|---|
| 1979–80 | Chatham Maroons | WOHL | 6 | 1 | 0 | 1 | 0 | — | — | — | — | — |
| 1980–81 | Newmarket Flyers | OPJHL | 41 | 33 | 55 | 88 | 42 | — | — | — | — | — |
| 1981–82 | Brantford Alexanders | OHL | 68 | 30 | 46 | 76 | 31 | 11 | 3 | 6 | 9 | 6 |
| 1982–83 | Brantford Alexanders | OHL | 70 | 55 | 66 | 121 | 57 | 8 | 5 | 5 | 10 | 4 |
| 1983–84 | Canada | Intl | 43 | 15 | 22 | 37 | 34 | — | — | — | — | — |
| 1983–84 | Brantford Alexanders | OHL | 12 | 7 | 13 | 20 | 4 | 6 | 0 | 4 | 4 | 6 |
| 1984–85 | New York Rangers | NHL | 38 | 6 | 6 | 12 | 16 | — | — | — | — | — |
| 1984–85 | New Haven Nighthawks | AHL | 38 | 13 | 20 | 33 | 23 | — | — | — | — | — |
| 1985–86 | New York Rangers | NHL | 32 | 4 | 6 | 10 | 19 | — | — | — | — | — |
| 1985–86 | New Haven Nighthawks | AHL | 16 | 10 | 11 | 21 | 11 | 4 | 1 | 2 | 3 | 2 |
| 1986–87 | New York Rangers | NHL | 10 | 1 | 4 | 5 | 12 | — | — | — | — | — |
| 1986–87 | New Haven Nighthawks | AHL | 56 | 22 | 41 | 63 | 50 | 7 | 1 | 5 | 6 | 18 |
| 1987–88 | Minnesota North Stars | NHL | 51 | 8 | 11 | 19 | 55 | — | — | — | — | — |
| 1987–88 | Kalamazoo Wings | IHL | 14 | 16 | 10 | 26 | 26 | — | — | — | — | — |
| 1988–89 | Minnesota North Stars | NHL | 75 | 35 | 43 | 78 | 104 | — | — | — | — | — |
| 1988–89 | Kalamazoo Wings | IHL | 1 | 0 | 1 | 1 | 4 | — | — | — | — | — |
| 1989–90 | Minnesota North Stars | NHL | 79 | 40 | 38 | 78 | 54 | 7 | 2 | 3 | 5 | 16 |
| 1990–91 | Minnesota North Stars | NHL | 73 | 40 | 42 | 82 | 114 | 23 | 12 | 15 | 27 | 28 |
| 1991–92 | Minnesota North Stars | NHL | 78 | 31 | 40 | 71 | 107 | 7 | 2 | 4 | 6 | 8 |
| 1992–93 | Minnesota North Stars | NHL | 84 | 33 | 43 | 76 | 141 | — | — | — | — | — |
| 1993–94 | Dallas Stars | NHL | 76 | 32 | 29 | 61 | 83 | 9 | 5 | 1 | 6 | 2 |
| 1994–95 | HC Courmaosta | ITA | 3 | 0 | 0 | 0 | 0 | — | — | — | — | — |
| 1994–95 | Dallas Stars | NHL | 48 | 14 | 28 | 42 | 42 | 5 | 1 | 1 | 2 | 4 |
| 1995–96 | Dallas Stars | NHL | 45 | 14 | 13 | 27 | 44 | — | — | — | — | — |
| 1995–96 | Toronto Maple Leafs | NHL | 28 | 7 | 15 | 22 | 59 | 6 | 0 | 2 | 2 | 6 |
| 1996–97 | Calgary Flames | NHL | 82 | 27 | 33 | 60 | 48 | — | — | — | — | — |
| 1997–98 | Florida Panthers | NHL | 78 | 20 | 28 | 48 | 55 | — | — | — | — | — |
| 1998–99 | Florida Panthers | NHL | 36 | 4 | 10 | 14 | 39 | — | — | — | — | — |
| 1998–99 | Vancouver Canucks | NHL | 33 | 2 | 12 | 14 | 24 | — | — | — | — | — |
| NHL totals | | | 946 | 318 | 401 | 719 | 1,016 | 57 | 22 | 26 | 48 | 64 |

=== International ===
| Year | Team | Event | GP | G | A | Pts | PIM |
|---|---|---|---|---|---|---|---|
| 1984 | Canada | WJC | 7 | 4 | 2 | 6 | 4 |
| 1984 | Canada | OG | 7 | 5 | 2 | 7 | 6 |
| 1993 | Canada | WC | 8 | 3 | 1 | 4 | 6 |
| Senior totals | | | 15 | 8 | 4 | 12 | 12 |

| Preceded by Chris Kontos | New York Rangers first-round draft pick 1982 | Succeeded by Terry Carkner |
