= Neil Wilkinson (ice hockey) =

Canadian ice hockey player

- Born: August 15, 1967 (age 59) Selkirk, Manitoba, Canada
- Height: 6 ft 3 in (191 cm)
- Weight: 180 lb (82 kg; 12 st 12 lb)
- Position: Defence
- Shot: Right
- Played for: Minnesota North Stars; San Jose Sharks; Chicago Blackhawks; Winnipeg Jets; Pittsburgh Penguins
- NHL draft: 30th overall, 1986; Minnesota North Stars
- Playing career: 1988–1999; 2003–2004

Neil Wilkinson (born August 15, 1967) is a Canadian former professional ice hockey player. He was selected by the Minnesota North Stars in the second round (30th overall) of the 1986 NHL entry draft. He played in the National Hockey League between 1989 and 1999.

== Playing career ==
He played for the Minnesota North Stars, San Jose Sharks, Chicago Blackhawks, Winnipeg Jets and Pittsburgh Penguins in the 1980s and 1990s. Wilkinson retired from professional hockey after the 1998-99 NHL season.

== Retirement ==
Wilkinson remained retired for four seasons before making a brief return to the Central Hockey League in 2003 with the Tulsa Oilers and the ECHL's Fresno Falcons in 2004.

Wilkinson was inducted into the Manitoba Hockey Hall Of Fame on April 15, 2011. Due to his aggressive style of play and body checks he was given the nickname Big Daddy

== Career statistics ==
=== Regular season and playoffs ===
			Regular season					Playoffs
Season	Team	League	GP	G	A	Pts	PIM	GP	G	A	Pts	PIM
1985–86	Selkirk Steelers	MJHL	42	14	35	49	91	—	—	—	—	—
1986–87	Michigan State University	CCHA	19	3	4	7	18	—	—	—	—	—
1987–88	Medicine Hat Tigers	WHL	55	11	21	32	157	5	1	0	1	2
1987–88	Medicine Hat Tigers	M-Cup	—	—	—	—	—	1	0	0	0	0
1988–89	Kalamazoo Wings	IHL	39	5	15	20	96	—	—	—	—	—
1989–90	Minnesota North Stars	NHL	36	0	5	5	100	7	0	2	2	11
1989–90	Kalamazoo Wings	IHL	20	6	7	13	62	—	—	—	—	—
1990–91	Minnesota North Stars	NHL	50	2	9	11	117	22	3	3	6	12
1990–91	Kalamazoo Wings	IHL	10	0	3	3	38	—	—	—	—	—
1991–92	San Jose Sharks	NHL	60	4	15	19	107	—	—	—	—	—
1992–93	San Jose Sharks	NHL	59	1	7	8	96	—	—	—	—	—
1993–94	Chicago Blackhawks	NHL	72	3	9	12	116	4	0	0	0	0
1994–95	Winnipeg Jets	NHL	40	1	4	5	75	—	—	—	—	—
1995–96	Winnipeg Jets	NHL	21	1	4	5	33	—	—	—	—	—
1995–96	Pittsburgh Penguins	NHL	41	2	10	12	87	15	0	1	1	14
1996–97	Pittsburgh Penguins	NHL	23	0	0	0	36	5	0	0	0	4
1996–97	Cleveland Lumberjacks	IHL	2	0	1	1	0	—	—	—	—	—
1997–98	Pittsburgh Penguins	NHL	34	2	4	6	24	—	—	—	—	—
1998–99	Pittsburgh Penguins	NHL	24	0	0	0	22	—	—	—	—	—
2002–03	Tulsa Oilers	CHL	13	1	6	7	8	—	—	—	—	—
2003–04	Jacksonville Barracudas	WHA2	28	1	11	12	66	—	—	—	—	—
2003–04	Fresno Falcons	ECHL	20	1	5	6	8	—	—	—	—	—
NHL totals			460	16	67	83	813	53	3	6	9	41
