= Shawn Chambers =

American ice hockey player (born 1966)

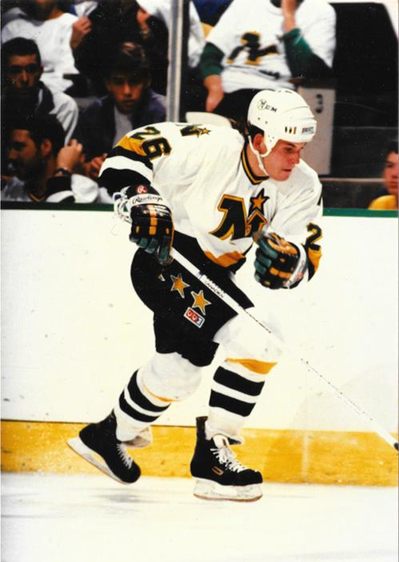
- Born: October 11, 1966 (age 59) Royal Oak, Michigan, U.S.
- Height: 6 ft 2 in (188 cm)
- Weight: 210 lb (95 kg; 15 st 0 lb)
- Position: Defense
- Shot: Left
- Played for: Minnesota North Stars; Washington Capitals; Tampa Bay Lightning; New Jersey Devils; Dallas Stars
- National team: United States
- NHL draft: 1987 NHL Supplemental Draft; Minnesota North Stars
- Playing career: 1987–2000

Shawn Randall Chambers (born October 11, 1966) is an American former professional ice hockey player who played in the National Hockey League (NHL).

== Playing career ==
A defenseman, Chambers played college hockey at the University of Alaska Fairbanks from 1985-1987. The Shawn Chambers Top Defenseman Award is presented annually to the best defenseman on the Alaska Nanooks ice hockey team.

Chambers was selected by the Minnesota North Stars in the 1987 NHL Supplemental Draft. He played parts of four seasons with the North Stars, including the 1991 improbable run to the finals.

Chambers was traded to the Washington Capitals prior to the 1991–92 NHL season, however he only played two games with the Capitals due to injuries. Left exposed in the 1992 NHL Expansion Draft, he was claimed by the Tampa Bay Lightning. After playing two and a half seasons with the Lightning, he was traded to the New Jersey Devils, and his strong defensive play helped guide the Devils to their first Stanley Cup in 1995.

Chambers would join the Dallas Stars prior to the 1997–98 NHL season, and a year later he would help guide the Stars to their first Stanley Cup Championship in 1999. He retired after only playing four games for the Stars the next season.

Chambers has the distinction of being the only player to be selected in the NHL Supplemental Draft to win the Stanley Cup in his playing career.

Chambers also has the unfortunate distinction of having the lowest overall rating of any athlete in a sports video game, with an overall rating of 1 on the video game NHLPA Hockey '93.

== Career statistics ==
=== Regular season and playoffs ===
			Regular season					Playoffs
Season	Team	League	GP	G	A	Pts	PIM	GP	G	A	Pts	PIM
1985–86	U. of Alaska-Fairbanks	GWHC	25	15	21	36	34	—	—	—	—	—
1986–87	U. of Alaska-Fairbanks	GWHC	28	11	19	30	0	—	—	—	—	—
1986–87	Seattle Thunderbirds	WHL	28	8	25	33	58	—	—	—	—	—
1986–87	Fort Wayne Komets	IHL	12	2	6	8	0	10	1	4	5	5
1987–88	Kalamazoo Wings	IHL	19	1	6	7	22	—	—	—	—	—
1987–88	Minnesota North Stars	NHL	19	1	7	8	21	—	—	—	—	—
1988–89	Minnesota North Stars	NHL	72	5	19	24	80	3	0	2	2	0
1989–90	Minnesota North Stars	NHL	78	8	18	26	81	7	2	1	3	10
1990–91	Kalamazoo Wings	IHL	3	1	1	2	0	—	—	—	—	—
1990–91	Minnesota North Stars	NHL	29	1	3	4	24	23	0	7	7	16
1991–92	Baltimore Skipjacks	AHL	5	2	3	5	9	—	—	—	—	—
1991–92	Washington Capitals	NHL	2	0	0	0	2	—	—	—	—	—
1992–93	Atlanta Knights	IHL	6	0	2	2	18	—	—	—	—	—
1992–93	Tampa Bay Lightning	NHL	55	10	29	39	36	—	—	—	—	—
1993–94	Tampa Bay Lightning	NHL	66	11	23	34	23	—	—	—	—	—
1994–95	Tampa Bay Lightning	NHL	24	2	12	14	6	—	—	—	—	—
1994–95	New Jersey Devils	NHL	21	2	5	7	6	20	4	5	9	2
1995–96	New Jersey Devils	NHL	64	2	21	23	18	—	—	—	—	—
1996–97	New Jersey Devils	NHL	73	4	17	21	19	10	1	6	7	6
1997–98	Dallas Stars	NHL	57	2	22	24	26	14	0	3	3	20
1998–99	Dallas Stars	NHL	61	2	9	11	18	17	0	2	2	18
1999–2000	Dallas Stars	NHL	4	0	0	0	4	—	—	—	—	—
NHL totals			625	50	185	235	364	94	7	26	33	72

=== International ===
Year	Team	Event	GP	G	A	Pts	PIM
1994	United States	WC	8	0	3	3	4
1996	United States	WCH	1	0	0	0	0
Senior totals			9	0	3	3	4

== Awards ==
- 1994–95: Stanley Cup champion (New Jersey Devils)
- 1998–99: Stanley Cup champion (Dallas Stars)
