= Neal Broten =

American ice hockey player (born 1959)

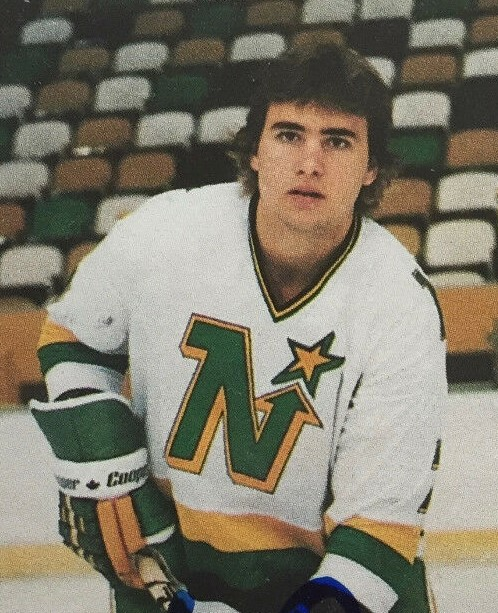
- Broten with the Minnesota North Stars in 1984
- Born: November 29, 1959 (age 66) Roseau, Minnesota, U.S.
- Height: 5 ft 10 in (178 cm)
- Weight: 185 lb (84 kg; 13 st 3 lb)
- Position: Center
- Shot: Left
- Played for: Minnesota North Stars; BSC Preussen; Dallas Stars; New Jersey Devils; Los Angeles Kings
- National team: United States
- NHL draft: 42nd overall, 1979; Minnesota North Stars
- Playing career: 1980–1997
Medal record
Men's ice hockey
Representing the United States
Olympic Games
Gold medal – first place	1980 Lake Placid	Team

Neal LaMoy Broten (born November 29, 1959) is an American former professional ice hockey player. A member of the 1980 US Olympic hockey team that won the gold medal at Lake Placid in 1980, Broten was inducted into the US Hockey Hall of Fame in 2000 having appeared in 1,099 National Hockey League (NHL) regular season games from 1981 to 1997 with the Minnesota North Stars, Dallas Stars, New Jersey Devils and Los Angeles Kings. He is the older brother of Aaron and Paul Broten.

== Early career ==
Broten, like his two brothers, attended Roseau High School, a perennial hockey contender in the state of Minnesota, where he appeared with the Rams in the state tournament in three consecutive years (1977–79). His 1978 achievement of four assists in a single period still stands as a Roseau Rams' record today.

As a college freshman playing for Herb Brooks and the Minnesota Golden Gophers, Broten scored 21 goals, had 50 assists, and was named WCHA Rookie of the Year His final goal of that season was the game winner that clinched the 1979 NCAA Championship in which the Gophers defeated the University of North Dakota by a score of 4–3. Broten would later win the inaugural Hobey Baker award in 1981, which honors the US collegiate hockey's best player.

Broten is one of two players, along with Ed Belfour, to have played on teams that won the NCAA hockey championship (University of Minnesota in 1979), the Olympic Gold Medal (Team USA, 1980), and the Stanley Cup (New Jersey Devils, 1995). He and Jack Eichel are the only players to have won the Hobey Baker, the Olympic gold medal and the Stanley Cup. Through 2025, Broten was one of only two American players, along with Ken Morrow, to have won both the Olympic gold and the Stanley Cup; with the American victory at the 2026 Winter Olympics, they have been joined by Eichel, Matt Tkachuk, Jake Guentzel, and Jaccob Slavin.

== NHL/International career ==
Broten was a member of the United States Olympic team that won a gold medal at the 1980 Winter Olympics in an event known as the Miracle on Ice. He was also a member of Team USA at the 1981 Canada Cup and 1984 Canada Cup tournaments as well as the 1990 Ice Hockey World Championship.

Broten played 17 seasons in the National Hockey League. Highlights of his long NHL career include the first American to score more than 100 points in a single season (1985–86) as well as two NHL All-Star Game appearances in 1983 and 1986.

He won a Stanley Cup with the New Jersey Devils in 1995, scoring the game-winning goal in Game Four against the Detroit Red Wings to clinch the title. Coincidentally, his 1980 Soviet counterpart Viacheslav Fetisov was on the ice for the heavily favored Red Wings when Broten scored the clincher. Broten became the first American to score a Cup-winning goal. Fellow Americans Brett Hull, Mike Rupp, Patrick Kane, Alec Martinez and Matthew Tkachuk have done it since.

Broten served as the captain of the Dallas Stars for two months during the lockout-shortened 1994–95 NHL season after the trade of previous captain Mark Tinordi. He was traded to New Jersey before the end of the season. He had previously served as an alternate captain on a number of occasions.

During the 1982–83 NHL season, Broten participated in a rare fight against Wayne Gretzky. It was one of only a handful of fights during both his and Gretzky's careers. Broten later recalled how he and his teammates would later have to deal with Gretzky's enforcers, Marty McSorley and Dave Semenko.

Broten initially refused to play for the North Stars in 1991–92 due to a contract dispute, instead playing in Germany for BSC Preussen Berlin where he filled in for his former U.S. Olympic teammate Dave Silk who was on temporary leave in the U.S. with his pregnant wife.

== Post career ==
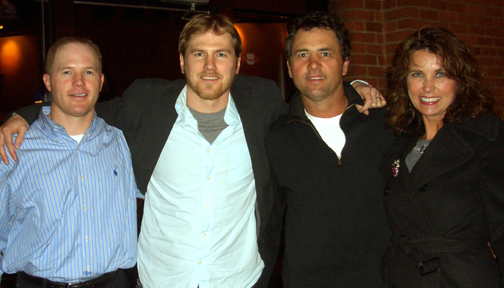
Broten in 2008 (second from right)

Broten briefly came out of retirement in 1999 to once again play for the US national team in the 1999 Ice Hockey World Championship qualifying tournament (the U.S. team featuring several NHL players had surprisingly finished among the bottom four in the previous 1998 world championship tournament) when no active NHL players were available. He scored six points in three games as the U.S. won the tournament, before retiring from hockey for good. He lives in River Falls, WI. In 2014, Broten's nephew, Shane Gersich, was drafted by the Washington Capitals.

== In popular culture ==
Broten is not featured in the 1981 TV movie about the 1980 U.S. hockey team called Miracle on Ice except in archival footage of the gold medal ceremony.

In the 2004 Disney movie Miracle, he is portrayed by Trevor Alto. Alto played college hockey for the University of British Columbia Thunderbirds.

In the 2008 documentary, Pond Hockey, he reflects on his youth growing up playing hockey in his hometown of Roseau, MN.

== Awards and honors ==
Award	Year
All-WCHA First Team	1980–81
AHCA West All-American	1980–81

- NCAA Championship - Minnesota Golden Gophers (1979)
- WCHA Rookie of the Year (1979)
- Gold Medal XIII Olympic Winter Games, Lake Placid (1980)
- Hobey Baker Memorial Award (1981)
- NHL All Star (1983, 1986)
- Stanley Cup champion - New Jersey Devils (1995)
- Lester Patrick Trophy (1998)
- US Hockey Hall of Fame (2000)
- Broten's jersey number (7) was retired by the Dallas Stars (February 7, 1998).
- Voted by Minnesota Wild fans as the greatest hockey player ever from Minnesota (2009).

Transactions

- Drafted: Minnesota North Stars, 2nd Round (42 overall), 1979 NHL entry draft. Pick was obtained by the North Stars in a draft-day trade that sent Dave Semenko from the North Stars to the Edmonton Oilers in exchange for 2nd and 3rd round draft picks.
- Traded to the New Jersey Devils for Corey Millen, 2/27/95
- Traded from New Jersey Devils to Los Angeles Kings for future considerations, 11/22/96
- Claimed on waivers by Dallas from Los Angeles, 1/28/97

== Career statistics ==
=== Regular season and playoffs ===
			Regular season					Playoffs
Season	Team	League	GP	G	A	Pts	PIM	GP	G	A	Pts	PIM
1977–78	Roseau High School	HS-MN	26	43	77	120	—	—	—	—	—	—
1978–79	University of Minnesota	WCHA	40	21	50	71	18	—	—	—	—	—
1979–80	United States National Team	Intl	55	25	30	55	20	—	—	—	—	—
1980–81	University of Minnesota	WCHA	36	17	54	71	56	—	—	—	—	—
1980–81	Minnesota North Stars	NHL	3	2	0	2	12	19	1	7	8	9
1981–82	Minnesota North Stars	NHL	73	38	60	98	42	4	0	2	2	0
1982–83	Minnesota North Stars	NHL	79	32	45	77	43	9	1	6	7	10
1983–84	Minnesota North Stars	NHL	76	28	61	89	43	16	5	5	10	4
1984–85	Minnesota North Stars	NHL	80	19	37	56	39	9	2	5	7	10
1985–86	Minnesota North Stars	NHL	80	29	76	105	47	5	3	2	5	2
1986–87	Minnesota North Stars	NHL	46	18	35	53	33	—	—	—	—	—
1987–88	Minnesota North Stars	NHL	54	9	30	39	32	—	—	—	—	—
1988–89	Minnesota North Stars	NHL	68	18	38	56	57	5	2	2	4	4
1989–90	Minnesota North Stars	NHL	80	23	62	85	45	7	2	2	4	18
1990–91	Minnesota North Stars	NHL	79	13	56	69	26	23	9	13	22	6
1991–92	BSC Preussen	GER	8	3	5	8	2	—	—	—	—	—
1991–92	Minnesota North Stars	NHL	76	8	26	34	16	7	1	5	6	2
1992–93	Minnesota North Stars	NHL	82	12	21	33	22	—	—	—	—	—
1993–94	Dallas Stars	NHL	79	17	35	52	62	9	2	1	3	6
1994–95	Dallas Stars	NHL	17	0	4	4	4	—	—	—	—	—
1994–95	New Jersey Devils	NHL	30	8	20	28	20	20	7	12	19	6
1995–96	New Jersey Devils	NHL	55	7	16	23	14	—	—	—	—	—
1996–97	New Jersey Devils	NHL	3	0	1	1	0	—	—	—	—	—
1996–97	Los Angeles Kings	NHL	19	0	4	4	0	—	—	—	—	—
1996–97	Phoenix Roadrunners	IHL	11	3	3	6	4	—	—	—	—	—
1996–97	Dallas Stars	NHL	20	8	7	15	12	2	0	1	1	0
NHL totals			1,099	289	634	923	569	135	35	63	98	77

=== International ===
Year	Team	Event	GP	G	A	Pts	PIM
1979	United States	WJC	5	2	4	6	10
1980	United States	OG	7	2	1	3	2
1981	United States	CC	6	3	2	5	0
1984	United States	CC	6	3	1	4	4
1990	United States	WC	8	1	5	6	4
Junior totals			5	2	4	6	10
Senior totals			27	9	9	18	10

== See also ==
- List of members of the United States Hockey Hall of Fame
- List of NHL players with 100-point seasons
- List of NHL players with 1,000 games played

Sporting positions
Preceded by Mark Tinordi	Dallas Stars captain January–February 1995	Succeeded by Derian Hatcher
Awards and achievements
Preceded by None	Winner of the Hobey Baker Award; 1980–81	Succeeded by George McPhee
