= 1997–98 New York Rangers season =

NHL hockey team season

1997–98 New York Rangers
- Division: 5th Atlantic
- Conference: 11th Eastern
- 1997–98 record: 25–39–18
- Home record: 14–18–9
- Road record: 11–21–9
- Goals for: 197
- Goals against: 231

Team information
- General manager: Neil Smith
- Coach: Colin Campbell (Oct.–Feb.); John Muckler (Feb.–Apr.)
- Captain: Brian Leetch
- Arena: Madison Square Garden
- Average attendance: 18,189
- Minor league affiliates: Hartford Wolf Pack; Charlotte Checkers

Team leaders
- Goals: Adam Graves/Wayne Gretzky/ Alexei Kovalev/Pat LaFontaine (23)
- Assists: Wayne Gretzky (67)
- Points: Wayne Gretzky (90)
- Penalty minutes: Darren Langdon (197)
- Plus/minus: Tim Sweeney (+7)
- Wins: Mike Richter (21)
- Goals against average: Dan Cloutier (2.50)

The 1997–98 New York Rangers season was the franchise's 72nd season. The Rangers posted a 25–39–18 regular season record, finishing in fifth place in the Atlantic Division. New York missed the Stanley Cup playoffs for the first time since the 1992–93 season.

The Rangers fired head coach Colin Campbell mid-season and replaced him with former Edmonton Oilers Stanley Cup-winning coach John Muckler. This was also the first season since the 1990–91 season that the Rangers did not have Mark Messier; after a contentious negotiating period, the Rangers elected not to re-sign Messier and he instead joined the Vancouver Canucks.

== Regular season ==
The Rangers were the only team in the league not to score a short-handed goal.

=== Final standings ===
Atlantic Division
No.	CR		GP	W	L	T	GF	GA	Pts
1	1	**New Jersey Devils**	82	48	23	11	225	166	107
2	3	**Philadelphia Flyers**	82	42	29	11	242	193	95
3	4	**Washington Capitals**	82	40	30	12	219	202	92
4	10	New York Islanders	82	30	41	11	212	225	71
5	11	New York Rangers	82	25	39	18	197	231	68
6	12	Florida Panthers	82	24	43	15	203	256	63
7	13	Tampa Bay Lightning	82	17	55	10	151	269	44

Eastern Conference
R		Div	GP	W	L	T	GF	GA	Pts
**1**	**New Jersey Devils**	**ATL**	**82**	**48**	**23**	**11**	**225**	**166**	**107**
**2**	**Pittsburgh Penguins**	**NE**	**82**	**40**	**24**	**18**	**228**	**188**	**98**
**3**	**Philadelphia Flyers**	**ATL**	**82**	**42**	**29**	**11**	**242**	**193**	**95**
**4**	**Washington Capitals**	**ATL**	**82**	**40**	**30**	**12**	**219**	**202**	**92**
**5**	**Boston Bruins**	**NE**	**82**	**39**	**30**	**13**	**221**	**194**	**91**
**6**	**Buffalo Sabres**	**NE**	**82**	**36**	**29**	**17**	**211**	**187**	**89**
**7**	**Montreal Canadiens**	**NE**	**82**	**37**	**32**	**13**	**235**	**208**	**87**
**8**	**Ottawa Senators**	**NE**	**82**	**34**	**33**	**15**	**193**	**200**	**83**
9	Carolina Hurricanes	NE	82	33	41	8	200	219	74
10	New York Islanders	ATL	82	30	41	11	212	225	71
11	New York Rangers	ATL	82	25	39	18	197	231	68
12	Florida Panthers	ATL	82	24	43	15	203	256	63
13	Tampa Bay Lightning	ATL	82	17	55	10	151	269	44

Divisions: ATL – Atlantic, NE – Northeast

bold – Qualified for playoffs

== Schedule and results ==
1997–98 regular season
October: 3–6–5 (home: 2–3–3; road: 1–3–2)

Game	Date	Opponent	Score	Record	Recap
1	October 3, 1997	New York Islanders	2–2 OT	0–0–1	T
2	October 5, 1997	Los Angeles Kings	2–2 OT	0–0–2	T
3	October 8, 1997	@ Edmonton Oilers	3–3 OT	0–0–3	T
4	October 9, 1997	@ Calgary Flames	1–1 OT	0–0–4	T
5	October 11, 1997	@ Vancouver Canucks	6–3	1–0–4	W
6	October 14, 1997	Pittsburgh Penguins	1–0	1–1–4	L
7	October 15, 1997	@ Ottawa Senators	5–1	1–2–4	L
8	October 18, 1997	@ St. Louis Blues	5–3	1–3–4	L
9	October 20, 1997	Carolina Hurricanes	4–2	2–3–4	W
10	October 22, 1997	Chicago Blackhawks	1–0	2–4–4	L
11	October 24, 1997	Tampa Bay Lightning	4–3	3–4–4	W
12	October 26, 1997	Mighty Ducks of Anaheim	3–3 OT	3–4–5	T
13	October 28, 1997	Dallas Stars	3–2	3–5–5	L
14	October 30, 1997	@ New York Islanders	5–3	3–6–5	L

November: 5–5–4 (home: 2–2–2; road: 3–3–2)

Game	Date	Opponent	Score	Record	Recap
15	November 3, 1997	Edmonton Oilers	2–2 OT	3–6–6	T
16	November 5, 1997	@ Colorado Avalanche	4–2	4–6–6	W
17	November 7, 1997	@ Dallas Stars	2–2 OT	4–6–7	T
18	November 12, 1997	New Jersey Devils	3–2	4–7–7	L
19	November 14, 1997	Pittsburgh Penguins	3–1	5–7–7	W
20	November 16, 1997	Colorado Avalanche	4–1	6–7–7	W
21	November 18, 1997	@ Florida Panthers	3–1	7–7–7	W
22	November 19, 1997	@ Tampa Bay Lightning	6–3	7–8–7	L
23	November 21, 1997	@ Carolina Hurricanes	4–3	8–8–7	W
24	November 22, 1997	@ Pittsburgh Penguins	4–3 OT	8–9–7	L
25	November 25, 1997	Vancouver Canucks	4–2	8–10–7	L
26	November 26, 1997	@ New York Islanders	4–1	8–11–7	L
27	November 28, 1997	@ Buffalo Sabres	3–3 OT	8–11–8	T
28	November 30, 1997	Florida Panthers	1–1 OT	8–11–9	T

December: 4–7–3 (home: 3–4–1; road: 1–3–2)

Game	Date	Opponent	Score	Record	Recap
29	December 2, 1997	Washington Capitals	3–2 OT	8–12–9	L
30	December 5, 1997	Philadelphia Flyers	4–4 OT	8–12–10	T
31	December 6, 1997	@ Montreal Canadiens	3–3 OT	8–12–11	T
32	December 8, 1997	Phoenix Coyotes	3–1	9–12–11	W
33	December 10, 1997	Calgary Flames	4–1	9–13–11	L
34	December 12, 1997	Florida Panthers	4–3	9–14–11	L
35	December 16, 1997	@ New Jersey Devils	4–3	9–15–11	L
36	December 17, 1997	@ Florida Panthers	4–2	10–15–11	W
37	December 20, 1997	@ Tampa Bay Lightning	2–2 OT	10–15–12	T
38	December 21, 1997	Buffalo Sabres	2–0	10–16–12	L
39	December 23, 1997	Tampa Bay Lightning	4–1	11–16–12	W
40	December 26, 1997	@ Buffalo Sabres	3–0	11–17–12	L
41	December 28, 1997	Boston Bruins	4–3	12–17–12	W
42	December 31, 1997	@ Tampa Bay Lightning	2–0	12–18–12	L

January: 4–4–3 (home: 3–2–2; road: 1–2–1)

Game	Date	Opponent	Score	Record	Recap
43	January 3, 1998	@ Washington Capitals	3–2	13–18–12	W
44	January 6, 1998	Carolina Hurricanes	4–2	14–18–12	W
45	January 8, 1998	Washington Capitals	5–3	14–19–12	L
46	January 12, 1998	Toronto Maple Leafs	3–2	15–19–12	W
47	January 14, 1998	@ New Jersey Devils	4–1	15–20–12	L
48	January 20, 1998	St. Louis Blues	3–1	16–20–12	W
49	January 22, 1998	Philadelphia Flyers	4–3	16–21–12	L
50	January 24, 1998	New Jersey Devils	3–3 OT	16–21–13	T
51	January 26, 1998	Washington Capitals	2–2 OT	16–21–14	T
52	January 29, 1998	@ Ottawa Senators	2–2 OT	16–21–15	T
53	January 31, 1998	@ Boston Bruins	4–2	16–22–15	L

February: 2–3–1 (home: 0–1–0; road: 2–2–1)

Game	Date	Opponent	Score	Record	Recap
54	February 2, 1998	@ San Jose Sharks	3–2	17–22–15	W
55	February 4, 1998	@ Mighty Ducks of Anaheim	3–2	17–23–15	L
56	February 5, 1998	@ Los Angeles Kings	3–1	17–24–15	L
57	February 7, 1998	@ Phoenix Coyotes	1–1 OT	17–24–16	T
58	February 26, 1998	@ Toronto Maple Leafs	5–2	18–24–16	W
59	February 28, 1998	Philadelphia Flyers	3–1	18–25–16	L

March: 4–9–2 (home: 3–4–1; road: 1–5–1)

Game	Date	Opponent	Score	Record	Recap
60	March 2, 1998	Buffalo Sabres	1–0	18–26–16	L
61	March 4, 1998	@ Florida Panthers	4–3	19–26–16	W
62	March 7, 1998	@ New Jersey Devils	6–3	19–27–16	L
63	March 9, 1998	New Jersey Devils	2–2 OT	19–27–17	T
64	March 11, 1998	San Jose Sharks	5–3	20–27–17	W
65	March 12, 1998	@ Montreal Canadiens	4–1	20–28–17	L
66	March 14, 1998	@ Boston Bruins	5–1	20–29–17	L
67	March 16, 1998	Ottawa Senators	5–4	21–29–17	W
68	March 18, 1998	Montreal Canadiens	2–1 OT	22–29–17	W
69	March 21, 1998	Detroit Red Wings	4–3	22–30–17	L
70	March 22, 1998	@ Philadelphia Flyers	5–4 OT	22–31–17	L
71	March 25, 1998	Ottawa Senators	3–2 OT	22–32–17	L
72	March 26, 1998	@ Carolina Hurricanes	4–1	22–33–17	L
73	March 28, 1998	@ Pittsburgh Penguins	2–2 OT	22–33–18	T
74	March 30, 1998	Tampa Bay Lightning	3–1	22–34–18	L

April: 3–5–0 (home: 1–2–0; road: 2–3–0)

Game	Date	Opponent	Score	Record	Recap
75	April 1, 1998	Boston Bruins	4–2	22–35–18	L
76	April 4, 1998	@ New York Islanders	3–0	22–36–18	L
77	April 5, 1998	@ Chicago Blackhawks	2–1 OT	23–36–18	W
78	April 7, 1998	Montreal Canadiens	3–2	23–37–18	L
79	April 11, 1998	@ Detroit Red Wings	5–2	23–38–18	L
80	April 14, 1998	@ Washington Capitals	3–1	23–39–18	L
81	April 15, 1998	New York Islanders	4–2	24–39–18	W
82	April 18, 1998	@ Philadelphia Flyers	2–1	25–39–18	W

Legend: W Win (2 points) L Loss (0 points) T Tie (1 point)

== Player statistics ==
=== Scoring ===
- Position abbreviations: C = Center; D = Defense; G = Goaltender; LW = Left wing; RW = Right wing
- † = Joined team via a transaction (e.g., trade, waivers, signing) during the season. Stats reflect time with the Rangers only.
- ‡ = Left team via a transaction (e.g., trade, waivers, release) during the season. Stats reflect time with the Rangers only.

No.	Player	Pos	Regular season					
No.	Player	Pos	GP	G	A	Pts	+/-	PIM
99	Wayne Gretzky	C	82	23	67	90	−11	28
16	Pat LaFontaine	C	67	23	39	62	−16	36
27	Alexei Kovalev	LW	73	23	30	53	−22	44
2	Brian Leetch	D	76	17	33	50	−36	32
24	Niklas Sundstrom	RW	70	19	28	47	0	24
17	Kevin Stevens	LW	80	14	27	41	−7	130
9	Adam Graves	LW	72	23	12	35	−30	41
37	Tim Sweeney	RW	56	11	18	29	7	26
33	Bruce Driver	D	75	5	15	20	−3	46
12	Mike Keane‡	RW	70	8	10	18	−12	47
5	Ulf Samuelsson	D	73	3	9	12	1	122
20	Brian Skrudland‡	C	59	5	6	11	−4	39
32	Mike Eastwood‡	C	48	5	5	10	−2	16
25	Alexander Karpovtsev	D	47	3	7	10	−1	38
18	Bill Berg	C	67	1	9	10	−15	55
26	Jeff Finley	D	63	1	6	7	−3	55
15	Darren Langdon	LW	70	3	3	6	0	197
10	Marc Savard	C	28	1	5	6	−4	4
28	P. J. Stock†	C	38	2	3	5	4	114
23	Jeff Beukeboom	D	63	0	5	5	−25	195
39	Vladimir Vorobiev	RW	15	2	2	4	−10	6
21	Johan Lindbom	LW	38	1	3	4	4	28
6	Doug Lidster	D	36	0	4	4	2	24
29	Eric Cairns	D	39	0	3	3	−3	92
36	Daniel Goneau	LW	11	2	0	2	−4	4
14	Geoff Smith	D	15	1	1	2	−4	6
8	Ryan VandenBussche‡	RW	16	1	0	1	−2	38
4	Maxim Galanov	D	6	0	1	1	1	2
35	Mike Richter	G	72	0	1	1		2
30	Sylvain Blouin	D	1	0	0	0	0	5
34	Dan Cloutier	G	12	0	0	0		19
12	Bob Errey†	RW	12	0	0	0	−5	7
14	Peter Ferraro†	RW	1	0	0	0	−2	2
31	Jason Muzzatti‡	G	6	0	0	0		10
36	Pierre Sevigny	LW	3	0	0	0	0	2
8	Brad Smyth†	RW	1	0	0	0	0	0
38	Ronnie Sundin	D	1	0	0	0	0	0
32	Harry York†	C	2	0	0	0	−1	0

=== Goaltending ===
- ‡ = Left team via a transaction (e.g., trade, waivers, release) during the season. Stats reflect time with the Rangers only.

No.	Player	Regular season									
No.	Player	GP	W	L	T	SA	GA	GAA	SV%	SO	TOI
35	Mike Richter	72	21	31	15	1888	184	2.66	.903	0	4143
34	Dan Cloutier	12	4	5	1	248	23	2.50	.907	0	551
31	Jason Muzzatti‡	6	0	3	2	156	17	3.26	.891	0	313

== Awards and records ==
=== Awards ===
Type	Award/honor	Recipient	Ref
League (annual)	NHL Second All-Star Team	Wayne Gretzky (Center)	
League (in-season)	NHL All-Star Game selection	Wayne Gretzky	
League (in-season)	NHL All-Star Game selection	Brian Leetch (Note: Leetch was voted to the starting lineup.)	
Team	Ceil Saidel Memorial Award	Adam Graves	
Team	Frank Boucher Trophy	Wayne Gretzky	
Team	Good Guy Award	Alexei Kovalev	
Team	Lars-Erik Sjoberg Award	Marc Savard	
Team	Players' Player Award	Darren Langdon	
Team	Rangers MVP	Wayne Gretzky	
Team	Steven McDonald Extra Effort Award	Wayne Gretzky	

=== Milestones ===
Milestone	Player	Date	Ref
First game	Marc Savard	October 3, 1997	
First game	Johan Lindbom	November 12, 1997	
First game	P. J. Stock	November 21, 1997	
First game	Dan Cloutier	January 3, 1998	
First game	Ronnie Sundin	January 14, 1998	
First game	Maxim Galanov	April 4, 1998	
1,000th point	Pat LaFontaine	January 22, 1998	

== Draft picks ==
New York's picks at the 1997 NHL entry draft in Pittsburgh, Pennsylvania at the Civic Arena.

Round	#	Player	Position	Nationality	College/Junior/Club team (League)
1	19	Stefan Cherneski	RW	Canada	Brandon Wheat Kings (WHL)
2	46	Wes Jarvis	D	Canada	Kitchener Rangers (OHL)
3	73	Burke Henry	D	Canada	Brandon Wheat Kings (WHL)
4	93	Tomi Kallarsson	D	Finland	HPK Junior (Finland)
5	126	Jason McLean	G	Canada	Moose Jaw Warriors (WHL)
5	134	Johan Lindbom	RW	Sweden	HV71 (SEL)
6	136	Mike York	C	United States	Michigan State University (NCAA)
6	154	Shawn Degagne	G	Canada	Kitchener Rangers (OHL)
7	175	Johan Holmqvist	G	Sweden	Brynäs IF (SEL)
7	182	Mike Mottau	D	United States	Boston College (NCAA)
8	210	Andrew Proskurnicki	LW	Canada	Sarnia Sting (OHL)
9	236	Richard Miller	D	United States	Providence College (NCAA)

== See also ==
- 1997–98 NHL season
