= List of New York Rangers award winners =

New York Rangers awards
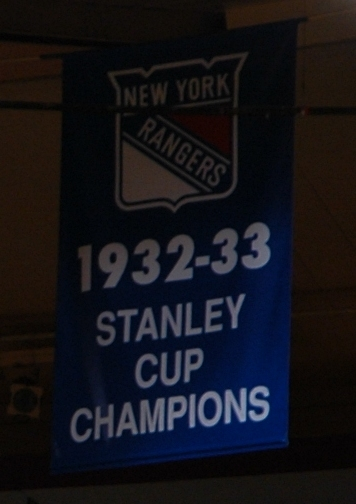
- 1932–33 Stanley Cup championship banner hanging in Madison Square Garden

Team trophies
- Award*: Wins
- Stanley Cup: 4
- Prince of Wales Trophy: 4
- Presidents' Trophy: 4
- O'Brien Trophy: 1

Individual awards
- Award*: Wins
- Bill Masterton Memorial Trophy: 5
- Calder Memorial Trophy: 8
- Charlie Conacher Memorial Trophy: 1
- Conn Smythe Trophy: 1
- Hart Memorial Trophy: 4
- James Norris Memorial Trophy: 5
- King Clancy Memorial Trophy: 1
- Lady Byng Memorial Trophy: 9
- Lester Patrick Trophy: 27
- Mark Messier Leadership Award: 1
- NHL Foundation Player Award: 1
- NHL Plus-Minus Award: 1
- Ted Lindsay Award: 3
- Vezina Trophy: 5

Total
- Awards won: 85

This is a list of New York Rangers award winners.

== League awards ==
=== Team trophies ===
Team trophies awarded to the New York Rangers
Award	Description	Times won	Seasons	References
Stanley Cup	NHL championship	4	1927–28, 1932–33, 1939–40, 1993–94	
O'Brien Trophy	NHL championship runner-up (1938–50)	1	1949–50	
Prince of Wales Trophy	American Division regular season champions (1927–38)	1	1931–32	
Prince of Wales Trophy	Regular season championship (1938–67)	1	1941–42	
Prince of Wales Trophy	Eastern Conference playoff championship (1981–present)	2	1993–94, 2013–14	
Presidents' Trophy	Most regular season points	4	1991–92, 1993–94, 2014–15, 2023–24	

=== Individual awards ===
Individual awards won by New York Rangers players and staff
Award	Description	Winner	Season	References
Bill Masterton Memorial Trophy	Perseverance, sportsmanship and dedication to hockey	Jean Ratelle	1970–71	
Bill Masterton Memorial Trophy	Perseverance, sportsmanship and dedication to hockey	Rod Gilbert	1975–76	
Bill Masterton Memorial Trophy	Perseverance, sportsmanship and dedication to hockey	Anders Hedberg	1984–85	
Bill Masterton Memorial Trophy	Perseverance, sportsmanship and dedication to hockey	Adam Graves	2000–01	
Bill Masterton Memorial Trophy	Perseverance, sportsmanship and dedication to hockey	Dominic Moore	2013–14	
Calder Memorial Trophy	Rookie of the year	Kilby MacDonald	1939–40	
Calder Memorial Trophy	Rookie of the year	Grant Warwick	1941–42	
Calder Memorial Trophy	Rookie of the year	Edgar Laprade	1945–46	
Calder Memorial Trophy	Rookie of the year	Pentti Lund	1948–49	
Calder Memorial Trophy	Rookie of the year	Gump Worsley	1952–53	
Calder Memorial Trophy	Rookie of the year	Camille Henry	1953–54	
Calder Memorial Trophy	Rookie of the year	Steve Vickers	1972–73	
Calder Memorial Trophy	Rookie of the year	Brian Leetch	1988–89	
Charlie Conacher Humanitarian Award	Outstanding contribution to humanitarian or community service projects	Ted Irvine	1974–75	
Conn Smythe Trophy	Most valuable player of the playoffs	Brian Leetch	1993–94	
Hart Memorial Trophy	Most valuable player to his team during the regular season	Buddy O'Connor	1947–48	
Hart Memorial Trophy	Most valuable player to his team during the regular season	Chuck Rayner	1949–50	
Hart Memorial Trophy	Most valuable player to his team during the regular season	Andy Bathgate	1958–59	
Hart Memorial Trophy	Most valuable player to his team during the regular season	Mark Messier	1991–92	
James Norris Memorial Trophy	Top defenseman during the regular season	Doug Harvey	1961–62	
James Norris Memorial Trophy	Top defenseman during the regular season	Harry Howell	1966–67	
James Norris Memorial Trophy	Top defenseman during the regular season	Brian Leetch	1991–92	
James Norris Memorial Trophy	Top defenseman during the regular season	Brian Leetch	1996–97	
James Norris Memorial Trophy	Top defenseman during the regular season	Adam Fox	2020–21	
King Clancy Memorial Trophy	Leadership qualities on and off the ice and humanitarian contributions within their community	Adam Graves	1993–94	
Lady Byng Memorial Trophy	Gentlemanly conduct	Frank Boucher	1927–28	
Lady Byng Memorial Trophy	Gentlemanly conduct	Frank Boucher	1932–33	
Lady Byng Memorial Trophy	Gentlemanly conduct	Clint Smith	1938–39	
Lady Byng Memorial Trophy	Gentlemanly conduct	Buddy O'Connor	1947–48	
Lady Byng Memorial Trophy	Gentlemanly conduct	Edgar Laprade	1949–50	
Lady Byng Memorial Trophy	Gentlemanly conduct	Andy Hebenton	1956–57	
Lady Byng Memorial Trophy	Gentlemanly conduct	Camille Henry	1957–58	
Lady Byng Memorial Trophy	Gentlemanly conduct	Jean Ratelle	1971–72	
Lady Byng Memorial Trophy	Gentlemanly conduct	Wayne Gretzky	1998–99	
Mark Messier Leadership Award	Player who exemplifies leadership on and off the ice	Jacob Trouba	2023–24	
NHL Foundation Player Award	Community service	Adam Graves	1999–2000	
NHL Plus-Minus Award	Highest plus-minus	Michal Rozsival	2005–06	
Ted Lindsay Award	Most valuable player as chosen by the players	Jean Ratelle	1971–72	
Ted Lindsay Award	Most valuable player as chosen by the players	Mark Messier	1991–92	
Ted Lindsay Award	Most valuable player as chosen by the players	Jaromir Jagr	2005–06	
Vezina Trophy	Fewest goals given up in the regular season (1927–81)	Dave Kerr	1939–40	
Vezina Trophy	Fewest goals given up in the regular season (1927–81)	Eddie Giacomin	1970–71	
Vezina Trophy	Fewest goals given up in the regular season (1927–81)	Gilles Villemure	1970–71	
Vezina Trophy	Top goaltender (1981–present)	John Vanbiesbrouck	1985–86	
Vezina Trophy	Top goaltender (1981–present)	Henrik Lundqvist	2011–12	
Vezina Trophy	Top goaltender (1981–present)	Igor Shesterkin	2021–22	

== All-Stars ==
=== NHL first and second team All-Stars ===
The NHL first and second team All-Stars are the top players at each position as voted on by the Professional Hockey Writers' Association.

New York Rangers selected to the NHL First and Second Team All-Stars
Player	Position	Selections	Season	Team
Andy Bathgate	Right Wing	4	1957–58	2nd
Andy Bathgate	Right Wing	4	1958–59	1st
Andy Bathgate	Right Wing	4	1961–62	1st
Andy Bathgate	Right Wing	4	1962–63	2nd
Frank Boucher	Center	5	1930–31	2nd
Frank Boucher	Center	5	1932–33	1st
Frank Boucher	Center	5	1933–34	1st
Frank Boucher	Coach	5	1939–40	2nd
Frank Boucher	Coach	5	1941–42	2nd
Hy Buller	Defense	1	1951–52	2nd
Neil Colville	Center	3	1938–39	2nd
Neil Colville	Center	3	1939–40	2nd
Neil Colville	Center	3	1947–48	2nd
Bill Cook	Right Wing	4	1930–31	1st
Bill Cook	Right Wing	4	1931–32	1st
Bill Cook	Right Wing	4	1932–33	1st
Bill Cook	Right Wing	4	1933–34	2nd
Bun Cook	Left Wing	1	1930–31	2nd
Art Coulter	Defense	3	1937–38	2nd
Art Coulter	Defense	3	1938–39	2nd
Art Coulter	Defense	3	1939–40	2nd
Cecil Dillon	Right Wing	3	1935–36	2nd
Cecil Dillon	Right Wing	3	1936–37	2nd
Cecil Dillon	Right Wing	3	1937–38	1st
Adam Fox	Defense	3	2020–21	1st
Adam Fox	Defense	3	2022–23	1st
Adam Fox	Defense	3	2023–24	2nd
Marian Gaborik	Right Wing	1	2011–12	2nd
Bill Gadsby	Defense	4	1955–56	1st
Bill Gadsby	Defense	4	1956–57	2nd
Bill Gadsby	Defense	4	1957–58	1st
Bill Gadsby	Defense	4	1958–59	1st
Eddie Giacomin	Goaltender	5	1966–67	1st
Eddie Giacomin	Goaltender	5	1967–68	2nd
Eddie Giacomin	Goaltender	5	1968–69	2nd
Eddie Giacomin	Goaltender	5	1969–70	2nd
Eddie Giacomin	Goaltender	5	1970–71	1st
Rod Gilbert	Right Wing	2	1967–68	2nd
Rod Gilbert	Right Wing	2	1971–72	1st
Adam Graves	Left Wing	1	1993–94	2nd
Wayne Gretzky	Center	1	1997–98	2nd
Vic Hadfield	Left Wing	1	1971–72	2nd
Doug Harvey	Defense	1	1961–62	1st
Ott Heller	Defense	1	1940–41	2nd
Camille Henry	Left Wing	1	1957–58	2nd
Bryan Hextall	Right Wing	4	1939–40	1st
Bryan Hextall	Right Wing	4	1940–41	1st
Bryan Hextall	Right Wing	4	1941–42	1st
Bryan Hextall	Right Wing	4	1942–43	2nd
Harry Howell	Defense	1	1966–67	1st
Jaromir Jagr	Right Wing	1	2005–06	1st
Ching Johnson	Defense	4	1930–31	2nd
Ching Johnson	Defense	4	1931–32	1st
Ching Johnson	Defense	4	1932–33	1st
Ching Johnson	Defense	4	1933–34	2nd
Dave Kerr	Goaltender	2	1937–38	2nd
Dave Kerr	Goaltender	2	1939–40	1st
Brian Leetch	Defense	5	1990–91	2nd
Brian Leetch	Defense	5	1991–92	1st
Brian Leetch	Defense	5	1993–94	2nd
Brian Leetch	Defense	5	1995–96	2nd
Brian Leetch	Defense	5	1996–97	1st
Tony Leswick	Left Wing	1	1949–50	2nd
Danny Lewicki	Left Wing	1	1954–55	2nd
Henrik Lundqvist	Goaltender	2	2011–12	1st
Henrik Lundqvist	Goaltender	2	2012–13	2nd
Donnie Marshall	Left Wing	1	1966–67	2nd
Mark Messier	Center	1	1991–92	1st
Jim Neilson	Defense	1	1967–68	2nd
Buddy O'Connor	Center	1	1947–48	2nd
Artemi Panarin	Left Wing	3	2019–20	1st
Artemi Panarin	Left Wing	3	2022–23	2nd
Artemi Panarin	Left Wing	3	2023–24	1st
Brad Park	Defense	5	1969–70	1st
Brad Park	Defense	5	1970–71	2nd
Brad Park	Defense	5	1971–72	1st
Brad Park	Defense	5	1972–73	2nd
Brad Park	Defense	5	1973–74	1st
Lester Patrick	Coach	7	1930–31	1st
Lester Patrick	Coach	7	1931–32	1st
Lester Patrick	Coach	7	1932–33	1st
Lester Patrick	Coach	7	1933–34	1st
Lester Patrick	Coach	7	1934–35	1st
Lester Patrick	Coach	7	1935–36	1st
Lester Patrick	Coach	7	1937–38	1st
Lynn Patrick	Left Wing	2	1941–42	1st
Lynn Patrick	Left Wing	2	1942–43	2nd
Dean Prentice	Left Wing	1	1959–60	2nd
Jean Ratelle	Center	1	1971–72	2nd
Chuck Rayner	Goaltender	3	1948–49	2nd
Chuck Rayner	Goaltender	3	1949–50	2nd
Chuck Rayner	Goaltender	3	1950–51	2nd
Earl Seibert	Defense	1	1934–35	1st
Igor Shesterkin	Goaltender	1	2021–22	1st
John Vanbiesbrouck	Goaltender	1	1985–86	1st
Steve Vickers	Left Wing	1	1974–75	2nd
Phil Watson	Center	1	1941–42	2nd

=== NHL All-Rookie Team ===
The NHL All-Rookie Team consists of the top rookies at each position as voted on by the Professional Hockey Writers' Association.

New York Rangers selected to the NHL All-Rookie Team
Player	Position	Season
Tony Amonte	Forward	1991–92
Dan Blackburn	Goaltender	2001–02
Michael Del Zotto	Defense	2009–10
Tony Granato	Forward	1988–89
Brian Leetch	Defense	1988–89
Henrik Lundqvist	Goaltender	2005–06
K'Andre Miller	Defense	2020–21
Mike Ridley	Forward	1985–86
Tomas Sandstrom	Forward	1984–85
Brady Skjei	Defense	2016–17
Mike York	Forward	1999–2000

=== All-Star Game selections ===
The National Hockey League All-Star Game is a mid-season exhibition game held annually between many of the top players of each season. Sixty-four All-Star Games have been held since 1947, with at least one player chosen to represent the Rangers in each year. The All-Star Game has not been held in various years: 1979 and 1987 due to the 1979 Challenge Cup and Rendez-vous '87 series between the NHL and the Soviet national team, respectively; 1995, 2005 and 2013 as a result of labor stoppages; 2006, 2010, 2014 and 2026 due to the Winter Olympic Games; 2021 as a result of the COVID-19 pandemic; and 2025 when it was replaced by the 2025 4 Nations Face-Off. The Rangers have hosted two of the games. The 26th and 45th took place at Madison Square Garden.

- † Selected by fan vote
- # Selected as one of four "last men in" by fan vote
- ↑ All-Star Game Most Valuable Player

New York Rangers players and coaches selected to the All-Star Game
Game	Year	Name	Position	References
1st	1947	Edgar Laprade	Center	
1st	1947	Tony Leswick	Left Wing	
1st	1947	Grant Warwick	Right Wing	
2nd	1948	Neil Colville	Center	
2nd	1948	Edgar Laprade	Center	
2nd	1948	Tony Leswick	Left Wing	
3rd	1949	Pat Egan	Defense	
3rd	1949	Edgar Laprade	Center	
3rd	1949	Tony Leswick	Left Wing	
3rd	1949	Buddy O'Connor	Center	
3rd	1949	Chuck Rayner	Goaltender	
4th	1950	Edgar Laprade	Center	
4th	1950	Tony Leswick	Left Wing	
4th	1950	Chuck Rayner	Goaltender	
5th	1951	Frank Eddolls	Defense	
5th	1951	Don Raleigh	Center	
5th	1951	Chuck Rayner	Goaltender	
5th	1951	Reg Sinclair	Right Wing	
5th	1951	Gaye Stewart	Left Wing	
6th	1952	Hy Buller	Defense	
6th	1952	Chuck Rayner	Goaltender	
6th	1952	Leo Reise, Jr.	Defense	
7th	1953	Wally Hergesheimer	Right Wing	
7th	1953	Leo Reise, Jr.	Defense	
7th	1953	Paul Ronty	Center	
8th	1954	Harry Howell	Defense	
8th	1954	Don Raleigh	Center	
8th	1954	Paul Ronty	Center	
9th	1955	Danny Lewicki	Left Wing	
10th	1956	Dave Creighton	Center	
10th	1956	Bill Gadsby	Defense	
10th	1956	George Sullivan	Center	
11th	1957	Andy Bathgate	Right Wing	
11th	1957	Bill Gadsby	Defense	
11th	1957	Dean Prentice	Left Wing	
12th	1958	Andy Bathgate	Right Wing	
12th	1958	Bill Gadsby	Defense	
12th	1958	Camille Henry	Center	
12th	1958	George Sullivan	Center	
13th	1959	Andy Bathgate	Right Wing	
13th	1959	Bill Gadsby	Defense	
13th	1959	George Sullivan	Center	
14th	1960	Andy Bathgate	Right Wing	
14th	1960	Bill Gadsby	Defense	
14th	1960	Andy Hebenton	Right Wing	
14th	1960	George Sullivan	Center	
15th	1961	Andy Bathgate	Right Wing	
15th	1961	Doug Harvey	Defense	
15th	1961	Dean Prentice	Left Wing	
15th	1961	Gump Worsley	Goaltender	
16th	1962	Andy Bathgate	Right Wing	
16th	1962	Doug Harvey	Defense	
16th	1962	Gump Worsley	Goaltender	
17th	1963	Andy Bathgate	Right Wing	
17th	1963	Camille Henry	Center	
17th	1963	Harry Howell	Defense	
18th	1964	Rod Gilbert	Right Wing	
18th	1964	Camille Henry	Center	
18th	1964	Harry Howell	Defense	
19th	1965	Rod Gilbert	Right Wing	
19th	1965	Vic Hadfield	Left Wing	
19th	1965	Harry Howell	Defense	
20th	1967	Eddie Giacomin	Goaltender	
20th	1967	Rod Gilbert	Right Wing	
20th	1967	Harry Howell	Defense	
20th	1967	Jim Neilson	Defense	
20th	1967	Bob Nevin	Right Wing	
21st	1968	Eddie Giacomin	Goaltender	
21st	1968	Harry Howell	Defense	
21st	1968	Donnie Marshall	Left Wing	
22nd	1969	Eddie Giacomin	Goaltender	
22nd	1969	Rod Gilbert	Right Wing	
22nd	1969	Bob Nevin	Right Wing	
23rd	1970	Eddie Giacomin	Goaltender	
23rd	1970	Rod Gilbert	Right Wing	
23rd	1970	Brad Park	Defense	
23rd	1970	Jean Ratelle	Center	
23rd	1970	Walt Tkaczuk	Center	
24th	1971	Dave Balon	Left Wing	
24th	1971	Eddie Giacomin	Goaltender	
24th	1971	Jim Neilson	Defense	
24th	1971	Brad Park	Defense	
24th	1971	Jean Ratelle	Center	
24th	1971	Gilles Villemure	Goaltender	
25th	1972	Rod Gilbert	Right Wing	
25th	1972	Vic Hadfield	Left Wing	
25th	1972	Brad Park	Defense	
25th	1972	Jean Ratelle	Center	
25th	1972	Rod Seiling	Defense	
25th	1972	Gilles Villemure	Goaltender	
26th	1973	Eddie Giacomin	Goaltender	
26th	1973	Brad Park	Defense	
26th	1973	Jean Ratelle	Center	
26th	1973	Gilles Villemure	Goaltender	
27th	1974	Brad Park	Defense	
28th	1975	Rod Gilbert	Right Wing	
28th	1975	Brad Park	Defense	
28th	1975	Steve Vickers	Left Wing	
29th	1976	Carol Vadnais	Defense	
29th	1976	Steve Vickers	Left Wing	
30th	1977	Phil Esposito	Center	
30th	1977	Rod Gilbert	Right Wing	
30th	1977	Don Murdoch	Right Wing	
31st	1978	Phil Esposito	Center	
31st	1978	Carol Vadnais	Defense	
32nd	1980	Phil Esposito	Center	
32nd	1980	Ron Greschner	Defense	
33rd	1981	Ed Johnstone	Right Wing	
34th	1982	Barry Beck	Defense	
34th	1982	Ron Duguay	Center	
35th	1983	Don Maloney	Left Wing	
36th	1984	Pierre Larouche	Center	
36th	1984	Don Maloney↑	Left Wing	
37th	1985	Anders Hedberg	Right Wing	
38th	1986	Reijo Ruotsalainen	Defense	
39th	1988	Tomas Sandstrom	Right Wing	
40th	1989	Brian Mullen	Left Wing	
41st	1990	Brian Leetch	Defense	
42nd	1991	Brian Leetch	Defense	
42nd	1991	Darren Turcotte	Center	
43rd	1992	Brian Leetch	Defense	
43rd	1992	Mark Messier	Center	
43rd	1992	Mike Richter	Goaltender	
44th	1993	Mike Gartner↑	Right Wing	
44th	1993	Kevin Lowe	Defense	
44th	1993	Brian Leetch† (Did not play)	Defense	
44th	1993	Mark Messier (Did not play)	Center	
45th	1994	Adam Graves	Left Wing	
45th	1994	Brian Leetch†	Defense	
45th	1994	Mark Messier	Center	
45th	1994	Mike Richter↑	Goaltender	
46th	1996	Brian Leetch	Defense	
46th	1996	Mark Messier	Center	
46th	1996	Pat Verbeek	Right Wing	
47th	1997	Wayne Gretzky†	Center	
47th	1997	Brian Leetch†	Defense	
47th	1997	Mark Messier	Center	
48th	1998	Wayne Gretzky	Center	
48th	1998	Brian Leetch†	Defense	
49th	1999	Wayne Gretzky↑	Center	
50th	2000	Mike Richter	Goaltender	
51st	2001	Theoren Fleury†	Right Wing	
51st	2001	Brian Leetch	Defense	
52nd	2002	Brian Leetch	Defense	
52nd	2002	Eric Lindros (Did not play)	Center	
52nd	2002	Mike York	Left Wing	
53rd	2003	Brian Leetch† (Did not play)	Defense	
53rd	2003	Tom Poti	Defense	
54th	2004	Jaromir Jagr	Right Wing	
54th	2004	Mark Messier	Center	
55th	2007	Brendan Shanahan	Left Wing	
56th	2008	Scott Gomez	Center	
57th	2009	Henrik Lundqvist	Goaltender	
58th	2011	Henrik Lundqvist	Goaltender	
58th	2011	Marc Staal	Defense	
59th	2012	Marian Gaborik↑	Right Wing	
59th	2012	Daniel Girardi	Defense	
59th	2012	Henrik Lundqvist	Goaltender	
59th	2012	John Tortorella	Co-coach	
60th	2015	Rick Nash	Left Wing	
61st	2016	Ryan McDonagh	Defense	
62nd	2017	Ryan McDonagh	Defense	
63rd	2018	Henrik Lundqvist	Goaltender	
64th	2019	Henrik Lundqvist	Goaltender	
65th	2020	Chris Kreider (replaced Panarin)	Left Wing	
65th	2020	Artemi Panarin (Did not play)	Left Wing	
66th	2022	Adam Fox (Did not play)	Defense	
66th	2022	Chris Kreider	Left Wing	
66th	2022	Mika Zibanejad# (Did not play)	Center	
67th	2023	Adam Fox†	Defense	
67th	2023	Artemi Panarin†	Left Wing	
67th	2023	Igor Shesterkin	Goaltender	
68th	2024	Peter Laviolette	Coach	
68th	2024	Igor Shesterkin	Goaltender	
68th	2024	Vincent Trocheck (replaced Jack Eichel)	Center	

=== All-Star benefit games ===
Prior to the institution of the National Hockey League All-Star Game the league held three different benefit games featuring teams of all-stars. The first was the Ace Bailey Benefit Game, held in 1934, after a violent collision with Eddie Shore of the Boston Bruins left Ace Bailey of the Toronto Maple Leafs hospitalized and unable to continue his playing career. In 1937 the Howie Morenz Memorial Game was held to raise money for the family of Howie Morenz of the Montreal Canadiens who died from complications after being admitted to the hospital for a broken leg. The Babe Siebert Memorial Game was held in 1939 to raise funds for the family of the Canadiens' Babe Siebert who drowned shortly after he retired from playing.

New York Rangers players and coaches selected to All-Star benefit games
Game	Year	Name	Position	References
Ace Bailey Benefit Game	1934	Bill Cook	Right Wing	
Ace Bailey Benefit Game	1934	Ching Johnson	Defense	
Ace Bailey Benefit Game	1934	Lester Patrick	Coach	
Howie Morenz Memorial Game	1937	Frank Boucher	Center	
Howie Morenz Memorial Game	1937	Cecil Dillon	Right Wing	
Babe Siebert Memorial Game	1939	Neil Colville	Center	
Babe Siebert Memorial Game	1939	Art Coulter	Defense	

=== All-Star Game replacement events ===
New York Rangers players and coaches selected to All-Star Game replacement events
Event	Year	Name	Position	References
Challenge Cup	1979	Ron Greschner (Did not play)	Defense	
Challenge Cup	1979	Anders Hedberg	Right Wing	
Challenge Cup	1979	Ulf Nilsson	Center	
Rendez-vous '87	1987	Tomas Sandstrom	Right Wing	
4 Nations Face-Off	2025	Adam Fox (United States)	Defense	
4 Nations Face-Off	2025	Chris Kreider (United States)	Left wing	
4 Nations Face-Off	2025	J. T. Miller (United States)	Center	
4 Nations Face-Off	2025	Vincent Trocheck (United States)	Center	
4 Nations Face-Off	2025	Urho Vaakanainen (Finland)	Defense	
4 Nations Face-Off	2025	Mika Zibanejad (Sweden)	Center	

== Career achievements ==
=== Hockey Hall of Fame ===
The following is a list of New York Rangers who have been enshrined in the Hockey Hall of Fame.

New York Rangers inducted into the Hockey Hall of Fame
Individual	Category	Year inducted	Years with Rangers in category	References
Glenn Anderson	Player	2008	1994	
Andy Bathgate	Player	1978	1952–1964	
Doug Bentley	Player	1964	1953–1954	
Max Bentley	Player	1966	1953–1954	
Frank Boucher	Player	1958	1926–1938, 1943–1944	
Johnny Bower	Player	1976	1953–1954	
Herb Brooks	Builder	2006	1981–1985	
Pavel Bure	Player	2012	2002–2003	
Neil Colville	Player	1967	1935–1942, 1945–1949	
Bill Cook	Player	1952	1926–1937	
Bun Cook	Player	1995	1926–1936	
Art Coulter	Player	1974	1936–1942	
Marcel Dionne	Player	1992	1987–1989	
Dick Duff	Player	2006	1964	
Phil Esposito	Player	1984	1975–1981	
Emile Francis	Builder	1982	1965–1975	
Bill Gadsby	Player	1970	1954–1961	
Mike Gartner	Player	2001	1990–1994	
Bernie Geoffrion	Player	1972	1966–1968	
Eddie Giacomin	Player	1987	1965–1975	
Rod Gilbert	Player	1982	1960–1978	
Wayne Gretzky	Player	1999	1996–1999	
Doug Harvey	Player	1973	1961–1964	
Bryan Hextall	Player	1969	1937–1944, 1945–1948	
Tim Horton	Player	1977	1970–1971	
Harry Howell	Player	1979	1952–1969	
William M. Jennings	Builder	1975	1961–1981	
Ching Johnson	Player	1958	1926–1937	
John Kilpatrick	Builder	1960	1934–1960	
Jari Kurri	Player	2001	1996	
Guy Lafleur	Player	1988	1988–1989	
Pat LaFontaine	Player	2003	1997–1998	
Edgar Laprade	Player	1993	1945–1955	
Brian Leetch	Player	2009	1987–2004	
Kevin Lowe	Player	2020	1992–1996	
Harry Lumley	Player	1980	1944	
Eric Lindros	Player	2016	2001–2004	
Henrik Lundqvist	Player	2023	2005–2020	
Mark Messier	Player	2007	1991–1997, 2000–2004	
Howie Morenz	Player	1945	1936	
Vaclav Nedomansky	Player	2019	1982–1983	
Roger Neilson	Builder	2002	1989–1993	
Buddy O'Connor	Player	1988	1947–1951	
Brad Park	Player	1988	1968–1975	
Craig Patrick	Builder	2001	1980–1986	
Lester Patrick	Player	1945	1927–1928	
Lynn Patrick	Player	1980	1934–1943, 1945–1946	
Jacques Plante	Player	1978	1963–1965	
Babe Pratt	Player	1966	1935–1942	
Jean Ratelle	Player	1985	1960–1975	
Chuck Rayner	Player	1973	1945–1953	
Luc Robitaille	Player	2009	1995–1997	
Glen Sather	Builder	1997	2000–2024	
Terry Sawchuk	Player	1971	1969–1970	
Earl Seibert	Player	1963	1931–1936	
Brendan Shanahan	Player	2013	2006–2008	
Fred Shero	Builder	2013	1978–1980	
Babe Siebert	Player	1961	1932–1933	
Clint Smith	Player	1991	1937–1943	
Martin St. Louis	Player	2018	2014–2015	
Allan Stanley	Player	1981	1948–1954	
Gump Worsley	Player	1980	1952–1953, 1954–1963	
Sergei Zubov	Player	2019	1992–1995	

=== Foster Hewitt Memorial Award ===
Three members of the Rangers organization have been honored with the Foster Hewitt Memorial Award. The award is presented by the Hockey Hall of Fame to members of the radio and television industry who make outstanding contributions to their profession and the game of ice hockey during their broadcasting career.

Members of the New York Rangers honored with the Foster Hewitt Memorial Award
Individual	Year honored	Years with Rangers as broadcaster	References
John Davidson	2009	1983–1984, 1986–2006	
Sal Messina	2005	1974–2003	
Sam Rosen	2016	1984–2025	

=== Lester Patrick Trophy ===
The Lester Patrick Trophy has been presented by the National Hockey League and USA Hockey since 1966 to honor a recipient's contribution to ice hockey in the United States. This list includes all personnel who have ever been employed by the New York Rangers in any capacity and have also received the Lester Patrick Trophy.

Members of the New York Rangers honored with the Lester Patrick Trophy
Individual	Year honored	Years with Rangers	References
Red Berenson	2006	1966–1967	
Jack Blatherwick	2019		
Frank Boucher	1993	1926–1955	
Herb Brooks	2002	1981–1985	
Bill Chadwick	1975	1967–1981	
Bob Crocker	2015	1993–2005	
John Davidson	2004	1975–1983, 1983–1984, 1986–2006, 2019–2021	
Marcel Dionne	2006	1987–1989	
Phil Esposito	1978	1975–1981, 1986–1989	
Emile Francis	1982	1948–1953, 1960–1976	
Rod Gilbert	1991	1960–1978	
Wayne Gretzky	1994	1996–1999	
John Halligan	2007	1963–1983, 1986–1990	
William M. Jennings	1971	1962–1981	
John Kilpatrick	1968	1933–34, 1935–1960	
Pat LaFontaine	1997	1997–1998, 2010–2011	
Brian Leetch	2007	1987–2004	
Tommy Lockhart	1968	1947–1953	
Mark Messier	2009	1991–1997, 2000–2004, 2009–2013	
Brian Mullen	1995	1987–1991, 2002–2004	
Murray Murdoch	1974	1926–1937	
Craig Patrick	2000	1980–1986	
Lynn Patrick	1989	1934–1950	
Larry Pleau	2002	1989–1997	
Mike Richter	2009	1989–2003	
Terry Sawchuk	1971	1969–1970	
Fred Shero	1980	1947–1951, 1978–1980	

=== United States Hockey Hall of Fame ===
Members of the New York Rangers inducted into the United States Hockey Hall of Fame
Individual	Year inducted	Years with Rangers	References
Taffy Abel	1973	1926–1929	
Tony Amonte	2009	1991–1994	
Red Berenson	2018	1966–1967	
Herb Brooks	1990	1981–1985	
Bobby Carpenter	2007	1987	
Bill Chadwick	1974	1967–1981	
Victor Desjardins	1974	1931–1932	
Bob Dill	1979	1943–1945	
Chris Drury	2015	2007–2011, 2015–Present	
Robbie Ftorek	1991	1981–1985	
Tony Granato	2020	1988-1990	
Kevin Hatcher	2010	1999–2000	
William M. Jennings	1981	1961–1981	
Pat LaFontaine	2003	1997–1998	
Myles Lane	1973	1928–1929	
Brian Leetch	2008	1987–2004	
Tommy Lockhart	1973	1947–1953	
Jack McCartan	1983	1960–1961	
Bill Moe	1974	1944–1949	
Ed Olczyk	2012	1992–1995	
Craig Patrick	1996	1980–1986	
Larry Pleau	2000	1989–1997	
Mike Richter	2008	1989–2003	
Mathieu Schneider	2015	1998–2000	
John Vanbiesbrouck	2007	1981, 1983–1993	
Doug Weight	2013	1991–1993	

=== Retired numbers ===
The New York Rangers have retired nine of their jersey numbers. Also out of circulation is the number 99 which was retired league-wide for Wayne Gretzky on February 6, 2000. Gretzky played the final three seasons of his 20-year NHL career with the Rangers and was the only Rangers player who ever wore the number 99 prior to its retirement.

New York Rangers retired numbers
Number	Player	Position	Years with Rangers as a player	Date of retirement ceremony	References
1	Eddie Giacomin	Goaltender	1965–1975	March 15, 1989	
2	Brian Leetch	Defense	1987–2004	January 24, 2008	
3	Harry Howell	Defense	1952–1969	February 22, 2009	
7	Rod Gilbert	Right Wing	1960–1977	October 14, 1979	
9	Andy Bathgate	Right Wing	1952–1964	February 22, 2009	
9	Adam Graves	Left Wing	1991–2001	February 3, 2009	
11	Vic Hadfield	Left Wing	1961–1974	December 2, 2018	
11	Mark Messier	Center	1991–1997, 2000–2004	January 12, 2006	
19	Jean Ratelle	Center	1960–1975	February 25, 2018	
30	Henrik Lundqvist	Goaltender	2005–2020	January 28, 2022	
35	Mike Richter	Goaltender	1989–2003	February 4, 2004	

== Team awards ==
=== John Halligan Good Guy Award ===
The John Halligan Good Guy Award is an annual award which "recognizes a player for their cooperation with the media throughout the season." It was renamed for longtime Rangers public relations director John Halligan after Halligan's death on January 20, 2010.

Season	Winner
1974–75	Ted Irvine
1975–76	Ron Harris
1976–77	John Davidson
1977–78	Rod Gilbert
1978–79	Dave Maloney
1979–80	Anders Hedberg
1980–81	Don Maloney
1981–82	Barry Beck
1982–83	Rob McClanahan
1983–84	Pierre Larouche
1984–85	John Vanbiesbrouck
1985–86	Ron Greschner
1986–87	James Patrick
1987–88	Bob Froese
1988–89	Tony Granato
1989–90	Kelly Kisio
1990–91	Mike Richter

Season	Winner
1991–92	Mark Messier
1992–93	Adam Graves
1993–94	Neil Smith
1994–95	Kevin Lowe
1995–96	Glenn Healy
1996–97	Wayne Gretzky
1997–98	Alexei Kovalev
1998–99	Kevin Stevens
1999–00	Tim Taylor
2000–01	Petr Nedved
2001–02	Brian Leetch
2002–03	Bobby Holik
2003–04	Eric Lindros
2005–06	Jaromir Jagr
2006–07	Brendan Shanahan
2007–08	Henrik Lundqvist
2008–09	Tom Renney

Season	Winner
2009–10	Erik Christensen
2009–10	Vaclav Prospal
2010–11	Ryan Callahan
2011–12	Brian Boyle
2012–13	Daniel Girardi
2013–14	Marc Staal
2014–15	Derek Stepan
2015–16	Ryan McDonagh
2016–17	Rick Nash
2017–18	Brady Skjei
2018–19	Mika Zibanejad
2019–20	Chris Kreider
2020–21	Brendan Smith
2021–22	Ryan Strome
2022–23	Filip Chytil
2023–24	Jimmy Vesey
2024–25	Artemi Panarin

=== Lars-Erik Sjoberg Award ===
The Lars-Erik Sjoberg Award is an annual award given to the top rookie during training camp. The award is named for Lars-Erik Sjoberg, who was the Rangers chief European scout for eight years who died at the age of 43 on October 20, 1987.

Year	Winner
1988	Mike Richter
1989	Troy Mallette
1990	Steven Rice
1991	Tony Amonte
1992	Peter Andersson
1993	Mattias Norstrom
1994	Mattias Norstrom
1995	Niklas Sundstrom
1996	Eric Cairns
1997	Marc Savard

Year	Winner
1998	Manny Malhotra
1999	Kim Johnsson
2000	Filip Novak
2001	Dan Blackburn
2002	Jamie Lundmark
2003	Dominic Moore
2005	Henrik Lundqvist
2006	Nigel Dawes
2006	Brandon Dubinsky
2007	Marc Staal

Year	Winner
2008	Lauri Korpikoski
2009	Matt Gilroy
2010	Derek Stepan
2011	Carl Hagelin
2013	Jesper Fast
2014	Anthony Duclair
2015	Oscar Lindberg
2016	Jimmy Vesey
2017	Filip Chytil
2018	Lias Andersson

Year	Winner
2019	Adam Fox
2020	not awarded
2021	Nils Lundkvist
2022	Brennan Othmann
2023	Will Cuylle
2024	Adam Edstrom
2025	Noah Laba
2026	Alberts Smits

=== Mr. Ranger Award ===
The Mr. Ranger Award (officially known as Rod Gilbert "Mr. Ranger" Award) is an annual award given to the player "who best honors Rod's legacy by exemplifying leadership qualities both on and off the ice, and making a significant humanitarian contribution to his community."

Season	Winner
2021–22	Chris Kreider
2022–23	Jacob Trouba
2023–24	Adam Fox
2024–25	Jonathan Quick
2025–26	J. T. Miller

=== Players' Player Award ===
The Players' Player Award is an annual award given to the player "who best exemplifies what it means to be a team player" as determined by his teammates.

Season	Winner
1958–59	Andy Hebenton
1959–60	Andy Hebenton
1959–60	Red Sullivan
1960–61	Andy Hebenton
1961–62	Earl Ingarfield
1962–63	Andy Bathgate
1963–64	Rod Gilbert
1963–64	Phil Goyette
1964–65	Harry Howell
1965–66	Wayne Hillman
1965–66	Don Marshall
1966–67	Harry Howell
1967–68	Jean Ratelle
1968–69	Jean Ratelle
1969–70	Jean Ratelle
1970–71	Jean Ratelle
1971–72	Vic Hadfield
1972–73	Walt Tkaczuk
1973–74	Ted Irvine
1974–75	Jean Ratelle
1975–76	John Davidson
1976–77	John Davidson
1976–77	Phil Esposito
1977–78	John Davidson
1977–78	Ron Greschner
1978–79	Ulf Nilsson

Season	Winner
1979–80	Don Maloney
1980–81	Don Maloney
1981–82	Tom Laidlaw
1981–82	Mark Pavelich
1982–83	Tom Laidlaw
1983–84	Glen Hanlon
1984–85	Reijo Ruotsalainen
1985–86	John Vanbiesbrouck
1986–87	Don Maloney
1987–88	James Patrick
1988–89	Guy Lafleur
1989–90	Kelly Kisio
1990–91	Mike Richter
1991–92	Adam Graves
1992–93	Adam Graves
1993–94	Ed Olczyk
1994–95	Adam Graves
1995–96	Mark Messier
1996–97	Darren Langdon
1997–98	Darren Langdon
1998–99	Adam Graves
1999–00	Mike Richter
2000–01	Brian Leetch
2001–02	Brian Leetch
2002–03	Brian Leetch
2003–04	Brian Leetch

Season	Winner
2005–06	Jed Ortmeyer
2005–06	Kevin Weekes
2006–07	Brendan Shanahan
2007–08	Colton Orr
2007–08	Jason Strudwick
2008–09	Blair Betts
2008–09	Chris Drury
2009–10	Chris Drury
2010–11	Ryan Callahan
2011–12	Ryan Callahan
2012–13	Ryan Callahan
2013–14	Ryan McDonagh
2014–15	Rick Nash
2015–16	Jesper Fast
2016–17	Jesper Fast
2017–18	Jesper Fast
2018–19	Jesper Fast
2019–20	Jesper Fast
2020–21	Ryan Lindgren
2021–22	Barclay Goodrow
2021–22	Jacob Trouba
2022–23	Ryan Lindgren
2023–24	Jonathan Quick
2024–25	Sam Carrick

=== Rangers MVP ===
The Rangers MVP award is an annual award given to the team's most valuable player as determined by the Professional Hockey Writers' Association.

Season	Winner
1941–42	Lynn Patrick
1942–43	Lynn Patrick
1943–44	Ott Heller
1943–44	Bryan Hextall
1944–45	Ab DeMarco
1945–46	Chuck Rayner
1946–47	Chuck Rayner
1947–48	Buddy O'Connor
1948–49	Edgar Laprade
1948–49	Chuck Rayner
1949–50	Edgar Laprade
1950–51	Don Raleigh
1951–52	Hy Buller
1952–53	Paul Ronty
1953–54	Wally Hergesheimer
1954–55	Danny Lewicki
1955–56	Bill Gadsby
1956–57	Andy Bathgate
1957–58	Andy Bathgate
1958–59	Andy Bathgate
1959–60	Dean Prentice
1960–61	Gump Worsley
1961–62	Andy Bathgate
1962–63	Gump Worsley
1963–64	Harry Howell
1964–65	Don Marshall
1965–66	Bob Nevin
1966–67	Eddie Giacomin
1967–68	Rod Gilbert
1968–69	Eddie Giacomin
1969–70	Walt Tkaczuk
1970–71	Eddie Giacomin
1971–72	Jean Ratelle

Season	Winner
1972–73	Jean Ratelle
1973–74	Brad Park
1974–75	Rod Gilbert
1975–76	Rod Gilbert
1976–77	Dave Maloney
1977–78	Walt Tkaczuk
1978–79	Phil Esposito
1979–80	Anders Hedberg
1980–81	Ed Johnstone
1981–82	Barry Beck
1981–82	Mike Rogers
1982–83	Mark Pavelich
1983–84	Barry Beck
1984–85	Tomas Sandstrom
1985–86	John Vanbiesbrouck
1986–87	Walt Poddubny
1987–88	James Patrick
1988–89	Brian Leetch
1989–90	John Ogrodnick
1990–91	Brian Leetch
1991–92	Mark Messier
1992–93	Adam Graves
1993–94	Adam Graves
1994–95	Mark Messier
1995–96	Mark Messier
1996–97	Brian Leetch
1997–98	Wayne Gretzky
1998–99	Brian Leetch
1999–00	Mike Richter
2000–01	Brian Leetch
2001–02	Mike Richter
2002–03	Brian Leetch
2003–04	Bobby Holik

Season	Winner
2005–06	Jaromir Jagr
2006–07	Henrik Lundqvist
2007–08	Henrik Lundqvist
2008–09	Henrik Lundqvist
2009–10	Henrik Lundqvist
2010–11	Henrik Lundqvist
2011–12	Henrik Lundqvist
2012–13	Henrik Lundqvist
2013–14	Ryan McDonagh
2014–15	Rick Nash
2015–16	Henrik Lundqvist
2016–17	Ryan McDonagh
2017–18	Henrik Lundqvist
2018–19	Mika Zibanejad
2019–20	Artemi Panarin
2020–21	Adam Fox
2021–22	Igor Shesterkin
2022–23	Mika Zibanejad
2023–24	Artemi Panarin
2024–25	Artemi Panarin

=== Steven McDonald Extra Effort Award ===
The Steven McDonald Extra Effort Award is an annual award which is given to the player who "goes above and beyond the call of duty" as determined by the fans. The award is named for New York City police officer Steven McDonald, who was shot and injured on July 12, 1986.

Season	Winner
1987–88	Jan Erixon
1988–89	Tony Granato
1989–90	Kelly Kisio
1989–90	John Vanbiesbrouck
1990–91	Jan Erixon
1991–92	Adam Graves
1992–93	Adam Graves
1993–94	Adam Graves
1994–95	Mark Messier
1995–96	Mark Messier
1996–97	Brian Leetch
1997–98	Wayne Gretzky
1998–99	Adam Graves

Season	Winner
1999–00	Adam Graves
2000–01	Sandy McCarthy
2001–02	Sandy McCarthy
2002–03	Matthew Barnaby
2003–04	Jed Ortmeyer
2005–06	Henrik Lundqvist
2006–07	Jed Ortmeyer
2007–08	Brandon Dubinsky
2008–09	Ryan Callahan
2009–10	Ryan Callahan
2010–11	Brandon Prust
2011–12	Ryan Callahan
2012–13	Ryan Callahan

Season	Winner
2013–14	Mats Zuccarello
2014–15	Cam Talbot
2015–16	Mats Zuccarello
2016–17	Mats Zuccarello
2017–18	Henrik Lundqvist
2018–19	Mika Zibanejad
2019–20	Mika Zibanejad
2020–21	Adam Fox
2021–22	Chris Kreider
2022–23	Ryan Lindgren
2023–24	Vincent Trocheck
2024–25	Will Cuylle
2025–26	Mika Zibanejad

== Defunct team awards ==
=== Ceil Saidel Memorial Award ===
The Ceil Saidel Memorial Award was an annual award which honored and recognized a player "for their dedication to the organization on and off the ice" as chosen by the Rangers Fan Club. The award was named in honor of Ceil Saidel, who was a member of the Rangers Fan Club since its inception in 1951 and died in 1994 during an attempted robbery. It has not been awarded since the New York Rangers Fan Club suspended operations in 2010.

Season	Winner
1994–95	Adam Graves
1995–96	Adam Graves
1995–96	Glenn Healy
1996–97	Adam Graves
1997–98	Adam Graves
1998–99	Adam Graves

Season	Winner
1999–00	Adam Graves
2000–01	Adam Graves
2001–02	Brian Leetch
2002–03	Brian Leetch
2003–04	Mark Messier
2005–06	Henrik Lundqvist

Season	Winner
2006–07	Brendan Shanahan
2007–08	Brendan Shanahan
2008–09	Henrik Lundqvist
2009–10	Erik Christensen

=== "Crumb Bum" Award ===
The "Crumb Bum" Award is given to a member of the Rangers organization in recognition for service to New York youngsters. It was last awarded in 2004.

Year	Winner
1981	Ed Hospodar
1982	Barry Beck
1983	Nick Fotiu
1984	Dave Maloney
1984	Don Maloney
1985	Ron Greschner
1987	John Vanbiesbrouck

Year	Winner
1988	Pierre Larouche
1989	Guy Lafleur
1990	Carey Wilson
1991	Mike Gartner
1992	Kris King
1993	Adam Graves
1994	Brian Leetch

Year	Winner
1995	Mark Messier
1996	Jeff Beukeboom
1997	Mike Richter
1999	Rod Gilbert
2004	Matthew Barnaby

=== Frank Boucher Trophy ===
The Frank Boucher Trophy was an annual award given to the Ranger "who is considered the most popular player on and off the ice" as chosen by the Rangers Fan Club. It was named for Rangers great Frank Boucher. It has not been awarded since the New York Rangers Fan Club suspended operations in 2010.

Season	Winner
1951–52	Don Raleigh
1952–53	Wally Hergesheimer
1953–54	Johnny Bower
1954–55	Edgar Laprade
1955–56	Gump Worsley
1956–57	Andy Bathgate
1957–58	Andy Bathgate
1958–59	Andy Bathgate
1959–60	Dean Prentice
1960–61	Gump Worsley
1961–62	Andy Bathgate
1962–63	Gump Worsley
1963–64	Rod Gilbert
1964–65	Harry Howell
1965–66	Harry Howell
1966–67	Harry Howell
1967–68	Rod Gilbert
1968–69	Eddie Giacomin
1969–70	Walt Tkaczuk
1970–71	Dave Balon

Season	Winner
1971–72	Jean Ratelle
1972–73	Jean Ratelle
1973–74	Brad Park
1974–75	Rod Gilbert
1975–76	Rod Gilbert
1976–77	Rod Gilbert
1977–78	Pat Hickey
1978–79	Phil Esposito
1979–80	Phil Esposito
1980–81	Ed Johnstone
1981–82	Nick Fotiu
1982–83	Mark Pavelich
1983–84	Barry Beck
1983–84	Nick Fotiu
1984–85	Anders Hedberg
1984–85	Mike Rogers
1985–86	John Vanbiesbrouck
1986–87	Walt Poddubny
1987–88	Walt Poddubny
1988–89	Guy Lafleur

Season	Winner
1989–90	Brian Mullen
1990–91	Mike Richter
1991–92	Mark Messier
1992–93	Mike Gartner
1993–94	Adam Graves
1994–95	Mark Messier
1995–96	Mark Messier
1996–97	Mark Messier
1997–98	Wayne Gretzky
1998–99	Mike Richter
1999–00	Mike Richter
2000–01	Brian Leetch
2001–02	Mike Richter
2002–03	Mike Dunham
2003–04	Eric Lindros
2005–06	Jaromir Jagr
2006–07	Henrik Lundqvist
2007–08	Sean Avery
2008–09	Blair Betts
2009–10	Henrik Lundqvist

=== Rookie of the Year ===
The Rookie of the Year award was an annual award given to the Rangers top rookie as determined by the Rangers Fan Club. It was not awarded from 1994–95 through 1998–99. It has not been awarded since the New York Rangers Fan Club suspended operations in 2010.

Season	Winner
1984–85	John Vanbiesbrouck
1985–86	Mike Ridley
1986–87	Terry Carkner
1987–88	Ulf Dahlen
1988–89	Tony Granato
1988–89	Brian Leetch
1989–90	Darren Turcotte

Season	Winner
1990–91	Mike Richter
1991–92	Tony Amonte
1992–93	Sergei Zubov
1993–94	Alexander Karpovtsev
1999–00	Mike York
2000–01	Tomas Kloucek
2001–02	Dan Blackburn

Season	Winner
2002–03	Jamie Lundmark
2003–04	Jed Ortmeyer
2005–06	Henrik Lundqvist
2006–07	Daniel Girardi
2007–08	Brandon Dubinsky
2008–09	Lauri Korpikoski
2009–10	Michael Del Zotto

== Other awards ==
New York Rangers who have received non-NHL awards
Award	Description	Winner	Season	References
Best NHL Player ESPY Award	Best NHL player of the last calendar year	Mark Messier	1995	
Best NHL Player ESPY Award	Best NHL player of the last calendar year	Jaromir Jagr	2006	
Charlie Conacher Humanitarian Award	For humanitarian or community service projects	Ted Irvine	1974–75	
Golden Hockey Stick	Best Czech ice hockey player	Jaromir Jagr	2005–06	
Golden Hockey Stick	Best Czech ice hockey player	Jaromir Jagr	2006–07	
Golden Hockey Stick	Best Czech ice hockey player	Jaromir Jagr	2007–08	
Lionel Conacher Award	Canada's male athlete of the year	Buddy O'Connor	1948	
Lionel Conacher Award	Canada's male athlete of the year	Wayne Gretzky	1999	
Viking Award	Most valuable Swedish player in NHL	Anders Hedberg	1979–80	
Viking Award	Most valuable Swedish player in NHL	Tomas Sandstrom	1986–87	

== See also ==
- List of National Hockey League awards
