= 1994–95 New York Rangers season =

NHL hockey team season

1994–95 New York Rangers
- Division: 4th Atlantic
- Conference: 8th Eastern
- 1994–95 record: 22–23–3
- Home record: 11–10–3
- Road record: 11–13–0
- Goals for: 139
- Goals against: 134

Team information
- General manager: Neil Smith
- Coach: Colin Campbell
- Captain: Mark Messier
- Alternate captains: Adam Graves; Brian Leetch
- Arena: Madison Square Garden
- Average attendance: 18,194 (99.9%)
- Minor league affiliate: Binghamton Rangers

Team leaders
- Goals: Adam Graves (17)
- Assists: Mark Messier (39)
- Points: Mark Messier (53)
- Penalty minutes: Nick Kypreos (93)
- Plus/minus: Adam Graves (+9)
- Wins: Mike Richter (14)
- Goals against average: Glenn Healy (2.36)

The 1994–95 New York Rangers season was the franchise's 69th season. The season was shortened to 48 games due to the 1994–95 NHL lockout.

For the third time in as many years, the Rangers started the season with a different head coach. Mike Keenan, who had led the team to the Stanley Cup one year earlier, left to become head coach and general manager of the St. Louis Blues under controversial circumstances. Colin Campbell was hired to replace him and the Blues sent Petr Nedved to the Rangers as compensation for Keenan, with Doug Lidster and Esa Tikkanen sent to St. Louis with their former coach.

The Rangers barely qualified for the playoffs in the shortened season, finishing one point ahead of the Florida Panthers for the last spot in the Eastern Conference. The team advanced to the second round of the playoffs, where they fell in a sweep to the Philadelphia Flyers.

== Regular season ==
=== Final standings ===
Atlantic Division
No.	CR		GP	W	L	T	GF	GA	Pts
1	2	**Philadelphia Flyers**	48	28	16	4	150	132	60
2	5	**New Jersey Devils**	48	22	18	8	136	121	52
3	6	**Washington Capitals**	48	22	18	8	136	120	52
4	8	**New York Rangers**	48	22	23	3	139	134	47
5	9	Florida Panthers	48	20	22	6	115	127	46
6	12	Tampa Bay Lightning	48	17	28	3	120	144	37
7	13	New York Islanders	48	15	28	5	126	158	35

Note: No. = Division rank, CR = Conference rank, W = Wins, L = Losses, T = Ties, GF = Goals For, GA = Goals Against, Pts = Points
Teams that qualified for the playoffs are highlighted in bold.

Eastern Conference
R		Div	GP	W	L	T	GF	GA	Pts
**1**	**Quebec Nordiques**	**NE**	**48**	**30**	**13**	**5**	**185**	**134**	65
**2**	**Philadelphia Flyers**	**AT**	**48**	**28**	**16**	**4**	**150**	**132**	60
**3**	**Pittsburgh Penguins**	**NE**	**48**	**29**	**16**	**3**	**181**	**158**	61
**4**	**Boston Bruins**	**NE**	**48**	**27**	**18**	**3**	**150**	**127**	57
**5**	**New Jersey Devils**	**AT**	**48**	**22**	**18**	**8**	**136**	**121**	52
**6**	**Washington Capitals**	**AT**	**48**	**22**	**18**	**8**	**136**	**120**	52
**7**	**Buffalo Sabres**	**NE**	**48**	**22**	**19**	**7**	**130**	**119**	51
**8**	**New York Rangers**	**AT**	**48**	**22**	**23**	**3**	**139**	**134**	47
9	Florida Panthers	AT	48	20	22	6	115	127	46
10	Hartford Whalers	NE	48	19	24	5	127	141	43
11	Montreal Canadiens	NE	48	18	23	7	125	148	43
12	Tampa Bay Lightning	AT	48	17	28	3	120	144	37
13	New York Islanders	AT	48	15	28	5	126	158	35
14	Ottawa Senators	NE	48	9	34	5	117	174	23

Divisions: AT – Atlantic, NE – Northeast

bold – Qualified for playoffs

== Playoffs ==
The Rangers faced the first-place Quebec Nordiques in the first round of the playoffs. They narrowly lost Game 1, 5–4, as the Nordiques were powered by Joe Sakic's hat-trick. New York came back in game 2, winning 8–3. Sergei Nemchinov and Petr Nedved each scored twice. After edging the Nordiques 4–3 in Game 3, the Rangers found themselves trailing 2–0 in Game 4. They would tie it up on goals by Brian Leetch and Alexei Kovalev. Steve Larmer scored the winner at 8:09 of the first overtime period. Facing elimination, the Nordiques played a determined Game 5 at home and won 4–2 to cut New York's lead in the series to 3–2. The Rangers, at home for Game 6, built up a 4–0 lead and ended up winning 4–2, to eliminate the Nordiques four games to two. The Nordiques moved to Colorado almost immediately, as the announcement came on May 25, 1995.

In the second round, the Rangers faced a determined Philadelphia Flyers team that was led by the "Legion of Doom" line. In Game 1, the Rangers jumped out to a 2–0 lead after the first period on power-play goals by Brian Leetch and Petr Nedved. With the help of John LeClair's hat trick, the Flyers took a 4–3 lead in the third period. With only 19 seconds remaining, Pat Verbeek tied the game at 4–4. However, it was the Flyers who would ultimately win the game, as Eric Desjardins scored at 7:03 of the first overtime period. Game 2 started nearly identically to Game 1, as New York led 2–0 after the first period on power-play goals. Both were scored by Brian Leetch. Philadelphia re-gained control of the game as they had in Game 1, leading 3–2 midway through the third period. With under eight minutes to go, Leetch completed his hat trick to tie the score at 3–3. This game also went into overtime, and the Flyers needed only 25 seconds to win it, as defenseman Kevin Haller scored his 3rd of the playoffs to give Philadelphia a 2–0 lead in the series. The Flyers went on to dominate Games 3 and 4 at Madison Square Garden in New York, winning 5–2 and 4–1 to complete the sweep.

== Schedule and results ==
=== Regular season ===
1994–95 regular season
January: 2–4–0 (home: 2–3–0; road: 0–1–0)

Game	Date	Opponent	Score	Record	Recap
1	January 20, 1995	Buffalo Sabres	2–1	0–1–0	L
2	January 21, 1995	Montreal Canadiens	5–2	1–1–0	W
3	January 23, 1995	Boston Bruins	2–1	1–2–0	L
4	January 25, 1995	Pittsburgh Penguins	3–2	1–3–0	L
5	January 28, 1995	@ Quebec Nordiques	2–0	1–4–0	L
6	January 30, 1995	Ottawa Senators	6–2	2–4–0	W

February: 7–4–3 (home: 1–1–3; road: 6–3–0)

Game	Date	Opponent	Score	Record	Recap
7	February 1, 1995	@ Pittsburgh Penguins	4–3	2–5–0	L
8	February 2, 1995	Tampa Bay Lightning	3–3 OT	2–5–1	T
9	February 4, 1995	@ Ottawa Senators	2–1	3–5–1	W
10	February 8, 1995	Washington Capitals	5–4	4–5–1	W
11	February 9, 1995	@ New Jersey Devils	4–1	4–6–1	L
12	February 11, 1995	@ Tampa Bay Lightning	3–2	5–6–1	W
13	February 15, 1995	@ Buffalo Sabres	2–1	6–6–1	W
14	February 16, 1995	Montreal Canadiens	2–2 OT	6–6–2	T
15	February 18, 1995	@ Montreal Canadiens	5–2	6–7–2	L
16	February 20, 1995	@ Tampa Bay Lightning	3–1	7–7–2	W
17	February 21, 1995	@ Florida Panthers	5–3	8–7–2	W
18	February 24, 1995	Hartford Whalers	2–1	8–8–2	L
19	February 26, 1995	@ Buffalo Sabres	4–2	9–8–2	W
20	February 28, 1995	Florida Panthers	0–0 OT	9–8–3	T

March: 4–8–0 (home: 3–3–0; road: 1–5–0)

Game	Date	Opponent	Score	Record	Recap
21	March 1, 1995	@ Hartford Whalers	5–2	10–8–3	W
22	March 3, 1995	Philadelphia Flyers	5–3	11–8–3	W
23	March 5, 1995	@ Washington Capitals	4–2	11–9–3	L
24	March 6, 1995	Ottawa Senators	4–3	12–9–3	W
25	March 8, 1995	New Jersey Devils	6–4	13–9–3	W
26	March 11, 1995	@ Montreal Canadiens	3–1	13–10–3	L
27	March 15, 1995	Philadelphia Flyers	4–3	13–11–3	L
28	March 18, 1995	@ Washington Capitals	4–1	13–12–3	L
29	March 22, 1995	New Jersey Devils	5–2	13–13–3	L
30	March 23, 1995	@ New York Islanders	1–0	13–14–3	L
31	March 25, 1995	@ Quebec Nordiques	2–1	13–15–3	L
32	March 30, 1995	Quebec Nordiques	5–4	13–16–3	L

April: 9–6–0 (home: 5–2–0; road: 4–4–0)

Game	Date	Opponent	Score	Record	Recap
33	April 1, 1995	@ Boston Bruins	3–2	14–16–3	W
34	April 2, 1995	@ Philadelphia Flyers	4–2	14–17–3	L
35	April 5, 1995	@ Florida Panthers	5–0	15–17–3	W
36	April 7, 1995	New York Islanders	4–3	15–18–3	L
37	April 9, 1995	@ New Jersey Devils	2–0	15–19–3	L
38	April 12, 1995	Buffalo Sabres	3–1	16–19–3	W
39	April 14, 1995	Boston Bruins	5–3	17–19–3	W
40	April 16, 1995	@ New York Islanders	3–2	18–19–3	W
41	April 18, 1995	@ Pittsburgh Penguins	6–5	18–20–3	L
42	April 20, 1995	Hartford Whalers	3–2	19–20–3	W
43	April 23, 1995	@ Boston Bruins	5–4	19–21–3	L
44	April 24, 1995	Washington Capitals	5–4	20–21–3	W
45	April 26, 1995	Tampa Bay Lightning	6–4	21–21–3	W
46	April 28, 1995	New York Islanders	4–2	21–22–3	L
47	April 30, 1995	@ Philadelphia Flyers	2–0	22–22–3	W

May: 0–1–0 (home: 0–1–0; road: 0–0–0)

Game	Date	Opponent	Score	Record	Recap
48	May 2, 1995	Florida Panthers	4–3	22–23–3	L

Legend: W Win (2 points) L Loss (0 points) T Tie (1 point)

=== Playoffs ===
1995 Stanley Cup playoffs
Eastern Conference Quarterfinals vs. (1) Quebec Nordiques – Rangers win 4–2

Game	Date	Opponent	Score	Series	Recap
1	May 6, 1995	@ Quebec Nordiques	5–4	Nordiques lead 1–0	L
2	May 8, 1995	@ Quebec Nordiques	8–3	Series tied 1–1	W
3	May 10, 1995	Quebec Nordiques	4–3	Rangers lead 2–1	W
4	May 12, 1995	Quebec Nordiques	3–2 OT	Rangers lead 3–1	W
5	May 14, 1995	@ Quebec Nordiques	4–2	Rangers lead 3–2	L
6	May 16, 1995	Quebec Nordiques	4–2	Rangers win 4–2	W

Eastern Conference Semifinals vs. (2) Philadelphia Flyers – Flyers win 4–0

Game	Date	Opponent	Score	Series	Recap
1	May 21, 1995	@ Philadelphia Flyers	5–4 OT	Flyers lead 1–0	L
2	May 22, 1995	@ Philadelphia Flyers	4–3 OT	Flyers lead 2–0	L
3	May 24, 1995	Philadelphia Flyers	5–2	Flyers lead 3–0	L
4	May 26, 1995	Philadelphia Flyers	4–1	Flyers win 4–0	L

Legend: W Win L Loss

== Player statistics ==
=== Scoring ===
- Position abbreviations: C = Center; D = Defense; G = Goaltender; LW = Left wing; RW = Right wing
- † = Joined team via a transaction (e.g., trade, waivers, signing) during the season. Stats reflect time with the Rangers only.
- ‡ = Left team via a transaction (e.g., trade, waivers, release) during the season. Stats reflect time with the Rangers only.

No.	Player	Pos	Regular season						Playoffs					
No.	Player	Pos	GP	G	A	Pts	+/-	PIM	GP	G	A	Pts	+/-	PIM
11	Mark Messier	C	46	14	39	53	8	40	10	3	10	13	−11	8
2	Brian Leetch	D	48	9	32	41	0	18	10	6	8	14	−1	8
21	Sergei Zubov	D	38	10	26	36	−2	18	10	3	8	11	−9	2
9	Adam Graves	LW	47	17	14	31	9	51	10	4	4	8	−13	8
28	Steve Larmer	RW	47	14	15	29	8	16	10	2	2	4	−5	6
27	Alexei Kovalev	C	48	13	15	28	−6	30	10	4	7	11	2	10
16	Brian Noonan	RW	45	14	13	27	−3	26	5	0	0	0	0	8
10	Petr Nedved	C	46	11	12	23	−1	26	10	3	2	5	−4	6
17	Pat Verbeek†	RW	19	10	5	15	−2	18	10	4	6	10	−8	20
13	Sergei Nemchinov	LW	47	7	6	13	−6	16	10	4	5	9	6	2
25	Alexander Karpovtsev	D	47	4	8	12	−4	30	8	1	0	1	−1	0
24	Jay Wells	D	43	2	7	9	0	36	10	0	0	0	−4	8
32	Stephane Matteau	LW	41	3	5	8	−8	25	9	0	1	1	−1	10
4	Kevin Lowe	D	44	1	7	8	−2	58	10	0	1	1	−5	12
23	Jeff Beukeboom	D	44	1	3	4	3	70	9	0	0	0	1	10
19	Nick Kypreos	LW	40	1	3	4	0	93	10	0	2	2	3	6
20	Mark Osborne	LW	37	1	3	4	−2	19	7	1	0	1	1	2
12	Eddie Olczyk‡	LW	20	2	1	3	−2	4	—	—	—	—	—	—
26	Joe Kocur	RW	48	1	2	3	−4	71	10	0	0	0	0	8
5	Mattias Norstrom	D	9	0	3	3	2	2	3	0	0	0	−1	0
15	Darren Langdon	LW	18	1	1	2	0	62	—	—	—	—	—	—
30	Glenn Healy	G	17	0	2	2		2	5	0	0	0		0
29	Joby Messier	D	10	0	2	2	2	18	—	—	—	—	—	—
6	Glen Featherstone‡	D	6	1	0	1	0	18	—	—	—	—	—	—
39	Shawn McCosh	C	5	1	0	1	1	2	—	—	—	—	—	—
8	Jean-Yves Roy	RW	3	1	0	1	−1	2	—	—	—	—	—	—
18	Mike Hartman	LW	1	0	0	0	0	4	—	—	—	—	—	—
37	Daniel Lacroix†	C	1	0	0	0	0	0	—	—	—	—	—	—
22	Nathan LaFayette†	C	12	0	0	0	1	0	8	0	0	0	−1	2
14	Troy Loney†	LW	4	0	0	0	−2	0	1	0	0	0	0	0
35	Mike Richter	G	35	0	0	0		2	7	0	0	0		0

=== Goaltending ===
No.	Player	Regular season										Playoffs								
No.	Player	GP	W	L	T	SA	GA	GAA	SV%	SO	TOI	GP	W	L	SA	GA	GAA	SV%	SO	TOI
35	Mike Richter	35	14	17	2	884	97	2.92	.890	2	1993	7	2	5	189	23	3.60	.878	0	384
30	Glenn Healy	17	8	6	1	377	35	2.36	.907	1	888	5	2	1	93	13	3.39	.860	0	230

== Awards and records ==
=== Awards ===
Type	Award/honor	Recipient	Ref
League (annual)	Lester Patrick Trophy	Brian Mullen	
Team	Ceil Saidel Memorial Award	Adam Graves	
Team	"Crumb Bum" Award	Mark Messier	
Team	Frank Boucher Trophy	Mark Messier	
Team	Good Guy Award	Kevin Lowe	
Team	Lars-Erik Sjoberg Award	Mattias Norstrom	
Team	Players' Player Award	Adam Graves	
Team	Rangers MVP	Mark Messier	
Team	Steven McDonald Extra Effort Award	Mark Messier	

=== Milestones ===
Milestone	Player	Date	Ref
First game	Jean-Yves Roy	January 25, 1995	
First game	Darren Langdon	February 18, 1995	
1,000th point	Steve Larmer	March 8, 1995	
1,000th game played	Steve Larmer	April 20, 1995	
1,000th game played	Jay Wells	April 30, 1995	

== Transactions ==
- July 24, 1994 – Doug Lidster was traded by the New York Rangers, along with Esa Tikkanen, to the St. Louis Blues in exchange for Petr Nedved.
- March 23, 1995 – Hartford obtained D Glen Featherstone, D Michael Stewart and a first-round pick in the 1995 Entry Draft (Jean-Sebastien Giguere) and a fourth-round pick in the 1996 Entry Draft in exchange for RW Pat Verbeek.

== Draft picks ==
New York's picks at the 1994 NHL entry draft in Hartford, Connecticut, at the Hartford Civic Center.

Round	#	Player	Position	Nationality	College/Junior/Club team (League)
1	26	Dan Cloutier	G	Canada	Sault Ste. Marie Greyhounds (OHL)
2	52	Rudolf Vercik	LW	Slovakia	Slovan Bratislava (Slovak Extraliga)
3	78	Adam Smith	D	Canada	Tacoma Rockets (WHL)
4	100	Alexander Korobolin	D	Russia	Chelyabinsk Mechel (Rus-1)
4	104	Sylvain Blouin	LW	Canada	Laval Titan (QMJHL)
5	130	Martin Ethier	D	Canada	Beauport Harfangs (QMJHL)
6	135	Yuri Litvinov	C	Russia	PHC Krylya Sovetov (Russia)
6	156	David Brosseau	RW	Canada	Shawinigan Cataractes (QMJHL)
7	182	Alexei Lazarenko	RW	Ukraine	CSKA Moscow (Russia)
8	208	Craig Anderson	D	United States	Park Center Senior High School (USHS-MN)
9	209	Vitali Yeremeyev	G	Kazakhstan	HC Kamenogorsk (Russia)
9	234	Eric Boulton	LW	Canada	Oshawa Generals (OHL)
10	260	Radoslav Kropac	F	Slovakia	Slovan Bratislava (Slovakia)
11	267	Jamie Butt	LW	Canada	Tacoma Rockets (WHL)
11	286	Kim Johnsson	D	Sweden	Malmö IF (SEL)
