= John Halligan =

John or Johnny Halligan may refer to:

- John Halligan Jr. (1876–1934), U.S. admiral
- John Halligan (ice hockey) (c.1942–2010), New York Rangers public relations director and NHL executive
- John Halligan (politician), Irish politician from Waterford, Ireland
- Johnny Halligan, Scottish footballer (Hibernian FC)
