= Ryan Lindgren =

American ice hockey player (born 1998)

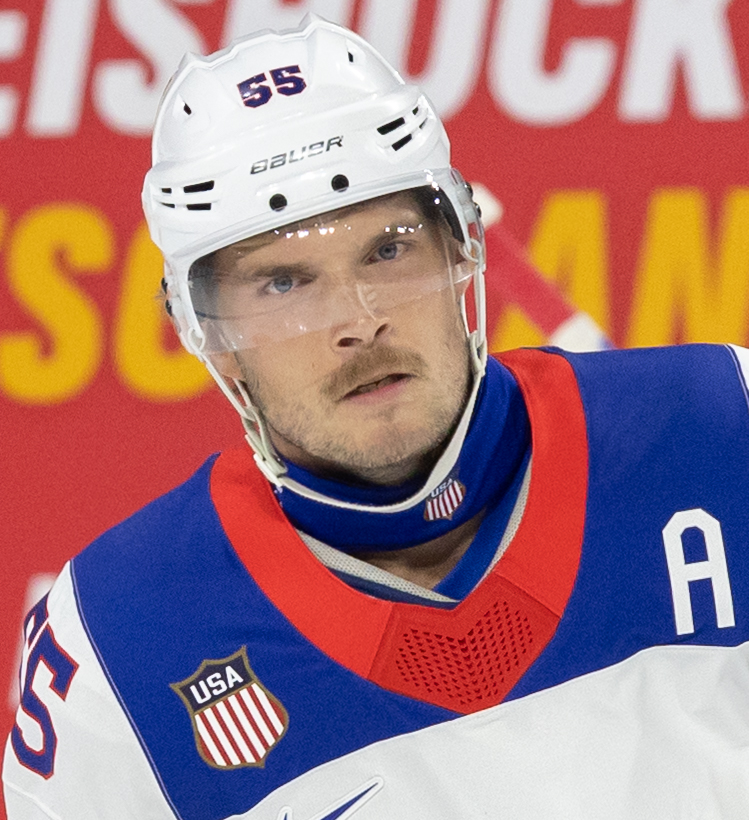
- Lindgren with Team USA in 2026
- Born: February 11, 1998 (age 28) Minneapolis, Minnesota, U.S.
- Height: 6 ft 0 in (183 cm)
- Weight: 194 lb (88 kg; 13 st 12 lb)
- Position: Defense
- Shoots: Left
- NHL team Former teams: Seattle Kraken; New York Rangers; Colorado Avalanche
- National team: United States
- NHL draft: 49th overall, 2016; Boston Bruins
- Playing career: 2018–present

Ryan Lindgren (born February 11, 1998) is an American professional ice hockey player who is a defenseman for the Seattle Kraken of the National Hockey League (NHL). He was picked in the second round (49th overall) of the 2016 NHL entry draft by the Boston Bruins, and has previously played in the NHL for the New York Rangers and Colorado Avalanche.

== Playing career ==
Lindgren is a defensive defenseman who plays physically. He was drafted by the Boston Bruins with the 49th pick in the second round of the 2016 NHL entry draft, a pick they received in exchange for Johnny Boychuk.

=== New York Rangers ===
On February 25, 2018, the New York Rangers acquired Lindgren along with a 2018 first-round pick, forwards Ryan Spooner and Matt Beleskey, and a 2019 seventh-round pick from the Bruins in an exchange for forward Rick Nash. He signed a contract with the Rangers on March 22, and signed an amateur tryout (ATO) contract with their American Hockey League (AHL) affiliate, the Hartford Wolf Pack on March 23, forgoing his junior and senior years of collegiate play with the University of Minnesota.

After spending the first half of the 2018–19 season with the Wolf Pack, he was called up by the Rangers for their January 15, 2019, game against the Carolina Hurricanes. He was returned to Hartford on January 19, after playing three games for the Rangers. On May 10, 2021, Lindgren signed a three-year contract with the Rangers.

During the 2022–23 season, in 63 games played, Lindgren has recorded a career-high in assists (17) and points (18), while tallying a team-high plus-29 rating. He blocked 91 shots, the fifth most on the Rangers and averaged 2:06 minutes of short-handed time on ice per game, the second most on the team. On November 30, 2022, during a game against the Ottawa Senators, Lindgren recorded a career-high three-assist/point game, becoming the fifth Rangers defensemen since the 2015–16 season to record a three-assist game, joining Adam Fox, Ryan McDonagh, Neal Pionk, and Brady Skjei. On April 10, 2023, Lindgren was the recipient of the 2023 Steven McDonald Extra Effort Award, which honors the legacy of New York Police Department detective Steven McDonald, who was shot and injured in the line of duty on July 12, 1986, and died on January 10, 2017. The award is presented annually to the Rangers player who, as chosen by the fans, "goes above and beyond the call of duty." The defenseman was recognized for his "leadership, impact and values that he exemplifies on the ice and throughout the community".

On July 30, 2024, the Rangers re-signed Lindgren to a one-year, $4.5 million contract extension to avoid salary arbitration.

=== Colorado Avalanche ===
On March 1, 2025, the Rangers traded Lindgren, Jimmy Vesey and prospect Hank Kempf, to the Colorado Avalanche in exchange for Calvin de Haan, Juuso Pärssinen, and two conditional draft picks in 2025.

=== Seattle Kraken ===
As a free agent at the conclusion of his contract with the Avalanche, Lindgren was signed to a four-year, $18 million contract with the Seattle Kraken on July 1, 2025.

== International play ==
Medal record

Representing United States

Men's ice hockey

World Junior Championships
Gold medal – first place	2017 United States	
Bronze medal – third place	2018 United States	

IIHF World U18 Championship
Bronze medal – third place	2016 United States	

Lindgren has represented the United States teams in international play. He began his international career as the United States captain at the 2015 World U-17 Hockey Challenge, where he recorded one assist in six games as his team lost in quarterfinals. He captained the under-18 team in the 2016 World U18 Championships, scoring two goals and adding three assists in seven games, helping his team to third place. He was also on the gold-winning junior team in the 2017 World Junior Championships, getting one assist in seven games. During the 2018 World Junior Championships, he was an alternate captain of the bronze-winning junior team, recording an assist in seven games.

Lindgren was ejected from a quarterfinal game at the 2026 World Championship after an illegal check to the head of Canadian defenseman Evan Bouchard.

== Personal life ==
Lindgren is the brother of Charlie Lindgren, a goaltender for the Washington Capitals.

== Career statistics ==
=== Regular season and playoffs ===
			Regular season					Playoffs
Season	Team	League	GP	G	A	Pts	PIM	GP	G	A	Pts	PIM
2014–15	U.S. National Development Team	USHL	35	3	10	13	65	—	—	—	—	—
2015–16	U.S. National Development Team	USHL	25	4	8	12	16	—	—	—	—	—
2016–17	University of Minnesota	B1G	32	1	6	7	65	—	—	—	—	—
2017–18	University of Minnesota	B1G	35	2	7	9	51	—	—	—	—	—
2017–18	Hartford Wolf Pack	AHL	10	2	2	4	23	—	—	—	—	—
2018–19	Hartford Wolf Pack	AHL	65	0	12	12	94	—	—	—	—	—
2018–19	New York Rangers	NHL	5	0	0	0	8	—	—	—	—	—
2019–20	Hartford Wolf Pack	AHL	9	1	1	2	6	—	—	—	—	—
2019–20	New York Rangers	NHL	60	1	13	14	47	3	0	1	1	0
2020–21	New York Rangers	NHL	51	1	15	16	35	—	—	—	—	—
2021–22	New York Rangers	NHL	78	4	11	15	48	17	2	3	5	10
2022–23	New York Rangers	NHL	63	1	17	18	45	7	1	1	2	6
2023–24	New York Rangers	NHL	76	3	14	17	36	16	0	3	3	6
2024–25	New York Rangers	NHL	54	2	17	19	36	—	—	—	—	—
2024–25	Colorado Avalanche	NHL	18	2	1	3	4	7	0	3	3	8
2025–26	Seattle Kraken	NHL	76	2	7	9	60	—	—	—	—	—
NHL totals			481	16	95	111	319	50	3	11	14	30

=== International ===
Year	Team	Event	Result	GP	G	A	Pts	PIM
2014	United States	U17	2nd place, silver medalist(s)	6	0	1	1	4
2016	United States	U18	3rd place, bronze medalist(s)	7	2	3	5	4
2017	United States	WJC	1st place, gold medalist(s)	7	0	1	1	0
2018	United States	WJC	3rd place, bronze medalist(s)	7	0	1	1	2
2026	United States	WC	8th	8	0	1	1	31
Junior totals				27	2	6	8	10
Junior totals				8	0	1	1	31

== Awards and honors ==
Award	Year	Ref
College
B1G All-Rookie Team	2017	
B1G Honorable Mention All-Star Team	2017, 2018	
New York Rangers
Players' Player Award	2021, 2023	
Steven McDonald Extra Effort Award	2023	

== External References ==
- Biographical information and career statistics from NHL.com, or Eliteprospects.com, or ESPN.com, or Eurohockey.com, or Hockey-Reference.com, or The Internet Hockey Database
