= 1998 Česká pojišťovna Cup =

1998 Česká Pojišťovna Cup
Tournament details
- Host country: Czech Republic
- City: Zlín
- Venue: 1 (in 1 host city)
- Dates: 3–6 September 1998
- Teams: 4

Final positions
- Champions: Sweden (1st title)
- Runners-up: Finland
- Third place: Czech Republic
- Fourth place: Russia

Tournament statistics
- Games played: 6
- Goals scored: 19 (3.17 per game)
- Attendance: 21,699 (3,617 per game)
- Scoring leader: (Sweden) Per Eklund (4 points)

The 1998 Česká Pojišťovna Cup was played between 3 and 6 September 1998. The Czech Republic, Finland, Sweden and Russia played a round-robin for a total of three games per team and six games in total. All games were played in Zimní stadion Luďka Čajky in Zlín, Czech Republic. The tournament was won by Sweden. The tournament was part of 1998–99 Euro Hockey Tour.

== Standings ==
| Pos | Team | Pld | W | D | L | GF | GA | GD | Pts |
|---|---|---|---|---|---|---|---|---|---|
| 1 | Sweden | 3 | 2 | 1 | 0 | 7 | 1 | +6 | 7 |
| 2 | Finland | 3 | 2 | 0 | 1 | 5 | 5 | 0 | 6 |
| 3 | Czech Republic | 3 | 0 | 2 | 1 | 4 | 5 | −1 | 2 |
| 4 | Russia | 3 | 0 | 1 | 2 | 3 | 8 | −5 | 1 |

Source: swehockey

== Games ==
All times are local. Zlín – (Central European Time – UTC+1)

| 3 September 1998; 16:00 | Russia | 0-3 (0-0, 0-1, 0-2) | Sweden | Zimní stadion Luďka Čajky, Zlín; Attendance: 1,174 |

Game reference

Oleg Shevtsov
Goalies
Johan Hedberg

| 0-1 | 36:00 – Eklund |
| 0-2 | 44:00 – Lindbom (Prestberg) |
| 0-3 | 54:00 – Eklund (Påhlsson) |

6 min
Penalties
12 min

| 3 September 1998; 20:00 | Czech Republic | 1-2 (0-1, 1-0, 0-1) | Finland | Zimní stadion Luďka Čajky, Zlín; Attendance: 4,946 |

Game reference

Milan Hnilička
Goalies
Vesa Toskala

| | 0-1 | 21:00 – Ikonen (Eloranta) |
| Patera (Procházka) – 13:00 | 1-1 |
| | 1-2 | 48:00 – Ruutu |

18 min
Penalties
24 min

| 4 September 1998; 18:00 | Sweden | 4-1 (0-1, 1-0, 3-0) | Finland | Zimní stadion Luďka Čajky, Zlín; Attendance: 1,982 |

Game reference

Magnus Eriksson
Goalies
Jussi Markkanen

| | 0-1 | 11:00 – Ahlberg (Koivisto, Tarvainen) |
| Påhlsson (Tjärnqvist, Wernblom) – 26:00 | 1-1 |
| Lindbom (Påhlsson, Eklund) – 43:00 | 2-1 |
| Lindbom (Påhlsson, Eklund) – 46:00 | 3-1 |
| Wernblom (Prestberg) – 52:00 | 4-1 |

20 min
Penalties
16 min

| 5 September 1998; 18:00 | Russia | 3-3 (0-1, 2-1, 1-1) | Czech Republic | Zimní stadion Luďka Čajky, Zlín; Attendance: 6,474 |

Game reference

Oleg Shevtsov
Goalies
Roman Čechmánek

| | 0-1 | 09:00 – Dopita (Procházka) |
| Butsayev (Yerofeyev) – 24:00 | 1-1 |
| Afinogenov (Prokopiev) – 29:00 | 2-1 |
| | 2-2 | 31:00 – Hlaváč (Výborný, Dopita) |
| Kudashov (Petrov, Bautin) – 41:00 | 3-2 |
| | 3-3 | 43:00 – Výborný (Hlaváč) |

14 min
Penalties
16 min

| 6 September 1998; 13:30 | Finland | 2-0 (0-0, 1-0, 1-0) | Russia | Zimní stadion Luďka Čajky, Zlín; Attendance: 1,123 |

Game reference
| Vesa Toskala | Goalies | Oleg Shevtsov |
Nummelin (Kauppila) – 24:00 / 1-0; Kapanen (Jääskeläinen, Somervuori) – 55:00 / 2-0
| 12 min | Penalties | 12 min |

| 6 September 1998; 17:30 | Czech Republic | 0-0 (0-0, 0-0, 0-0) | Sweden | Zimní stadion Luďka Čajky, Zlín; Attendance: 6,000 |

Game reference
| Milan Hnilička | Goalies | Johan Hedberg |
| 14 min | Penalties | 22 min |

== Scoring leaders ==
| Pos | Player | Country | GP | G | A | Pts | +/− | PIM | POS |
|---|---|---|---|---|---|---|---|---|---|
| 1 | Per Eklund | Sweden | 3 | 2 | 2 | 4 | +4 | 2 | F |
| 2 | Johan Lindbom | Sweden | 3 | 3 | 0 | 3 | +4 | 2 | F |
| 3 | Samuel Påhlsson | Sweden | 3 | 1 | 2 | 3 | +5 | 0 | F |
| 4 | Jiří Dopita | Czech Republic | 3 | 1 | 1 | 2 | +2 | 2 | F |
| 5 | Jan Hlaváč | Czech Republic | 3 | 1 | 1 | 2 | +2 | 2 | F |

GP = Games played; G = Goals; A = Assists; Pts = Points; +/− = Plus/minus; PIM = Penalties in minutes; POS = Position
Source: quanthockey

== Goaltending leaders ==
| Pos | Player | Country | TOI | GA | GAA | Sv% | SO |
|---|---|---|---|---|---|---|---|
| 1 | Johan Hedberg | Sweden | 120:00 | 0 | 0.00 | 100.00 | 2 |
| 2 | Vesa Toskala | Finland | 120:00 | 1 | X.XX | 98.50 | 1 |
| 3 | Milan Hnilička | Czech Republic | 118:37 | 2 | X.XX | 96.00 | 1 |
| 4 | Magnus Eriksson | Sweden | 60:00 | 1 | X.XX | 94.70 | 0 |
| 5 | Maxim Sokolov | Russia | 60:00 | 2 | X.XX | 92.30 | 0 |
| 6 | Roman Čechmánek | Czech Republic | 60:00 | 3 | X.XX | 89.60 | 0 |

TOI = Time on ice (minutes:seconds); SA = Shots against; GA = Goals against; GAA = Goals Against Average; Sv% = Save percentage; SO = Shutouts
Source: hokej

== Tournament awards ==
The tournament directorate named the following players in the tournament 1998:

- Best goalkeeper: (Sweden) Johan Hedberg
- Best defenceman: (Finland) Petteri Nummelin
- Best forward: (Czech Republic) Jiří Dopita

Media All-Star Team:

- Goaltender: (Finland) Vesa Toskala
- Defence: (Czech Republic) Libor Procházka, (Finland) Petteri Nummelin
- Forwards: (Russia) Maxim Afinogenov, (Czech Republic) Jiří Dopita, (Sweden) Per Eklund
