= Maxim Galanov =

Russian ice hockey player

- Born: 13 March 1974 (age 52) Krasnoyarsk, Soviet Union
- Height: 6 ft 0 in (183 cm)
- Weight: 212 lb (96 kg; 15 st 2 lb)
- Position: Defence
- Shot: Left
- Played for: New York Rangers; Pittsburgh Penguins; Atlanta Thrashers; Tampa Bay Lightning; Lada Togliatti; Severstal Cherepovets; Augsburger Panther; Neftekhimik Nizhnekamsk; Metallurg Novokuznetsk
- National team: Russia
- NHL draft: 61st overall, 1993; New York Rangers
- Playing career: 1992–2013

Maxim Nikolaevich Galanov (Russian: Максим Николаевич Галанов; born 13 March 1974) is a Russian former professional ice hockey player. Galanov was drafted 61st overall by the New York Rangers in the 1993 NHL entry draft and played in the National Hockey League for the Rangers, Pittsburgh Penguins, Atlanta Thrashers and the Tampa Bay Lightning. In all, Galanov played 122 regular season games in the NHL, scoring 8 goals and 12 assists for 20 points and recording 44 penalty minutes. Before and after his time in the NHL Galanov played for several teams in Russia, retiring in 2013. Internationally Galanov played for Russia at the 2000 World Championship.

== Career statistics ==
=== Regular season and playoffs ===
			Regular season					Playoffs
Season	Team	League	GP	G	A	Pts	PIM	GP	G	A	Pts	PIM
1992–93	Lada Togliatti	IHL	41	4	2	6	12	10	1	1	2	12
1993–94	Lada Togliatti	IHL	7	1	0	1	4	12	1	0	1	8
1994–95	Lada Togliatti	IHL	45	5	6	11	54	9	0	1	1	12
1995–96	Binghamton Rangers	AHL	72	17	36	53	24	4	1	1	2	0
1996–97	Binghamton Rangers	AHL	73	13	30	43	30	3	0	0	0	2
1997–98	Hartford Wolf Pack	AHL	61	6	24	30	22	13	3	6	9	2
1997–98	New York Rangers	NHL	6	0	1	1	2	—	—	—	—	—
1998–99	Pittsburgh Penguins	NHL	51	4	3	7	14	1	0	0	0	0
1999–00	Atlanta Thrashers	NHL	40	4	3	7	20	—	—	—	—	—
2000–01	Detroit Vipers	IHL	16	0	3	3	6	—	—	—	—	—
2000–01	Louisville Panthers	AHL	9	4	5	9	11	—	—	—	—	—
2000–01	St. John's Maple Leafs	AHL	17	2	7	9	10	4	0	0	0	2
2000–01	Tampa Bay Lightning	NHL	25	0	5	5	8	—	—	—	—	—
2001–02	Lada Togliatti	RSL	3	0	0	0	0	—	—	—	—	—
2001–02	Severstal Cherepovets	RSL	8	0	0	0	6	—	—	—	—	—
2002–03	Augsburger Panther	DEL	47	4	16	20	34	—	—	—	—	—
2003–04	Severstal Cherepovets	RSL	2	0	0	0	2	—	—	—	—	—
2003–04	Severstal Cherepovets-2	Rus-3	11	3	5	8	48	—	—	—	—	—
2003–04	Neftekhimik Nizhnekamsk	RSL	37	2	8	10	36	5	1	1	2	6
2004–05	Neftekhimik Nizhnekamsk	RSL	59	2	9	11	96	3	0	0	0	2
2005–06	Neftekhimik Nizhnekamsk	RSL	31	1	5	6	32	5	0	0	0	10
2006–07	Metallurg Novokuznetsk	RSL	54	3	4	7	60	3	0	0	0	2
2007–08	Metallurg Novokuznetsk	RSL	35	4	3	7	24	—	—	—	—	—
2008–09	Metallurg Novokuznetsk	KHL	38	0	1	1	20	—	—	—	—	—
2009–10	Metallurg Novokuznetsk	KHL	33	5	3	8	20	—	—	—	—	—
2009–10	Gazovik Tyumen	Rus-2	4	0	0	0	2	8	1	0	1	6
2010–11	Rubin Tyumen	VHL	39	2	7	9	28	16	1	5	6	24
2011–12	Rubin Tyumen	VHL	50	3	11	14	56	20	1	4	5	20
2012–13	Sokol Krasnoyarsk	VHL	45	1	8	9	22	—	—	—	—	—
RSL/KHL totals			393	27	40	67	366	47	3	4	7	52
NHL totals			122	8	12	20	44	1	0	0	0	0

== International statistics ==
Year	Team	Event	GP	G	A	Pts	PIM
1993	Russia	WJC	7	1	0	1	4
2000	Russia	WC	6	0	0	0	0
Junior totals			7	1	0	1	4
Senior totals			6	0	0	0	0
