= Adam Fox =

American ice hockey player (born 1998)

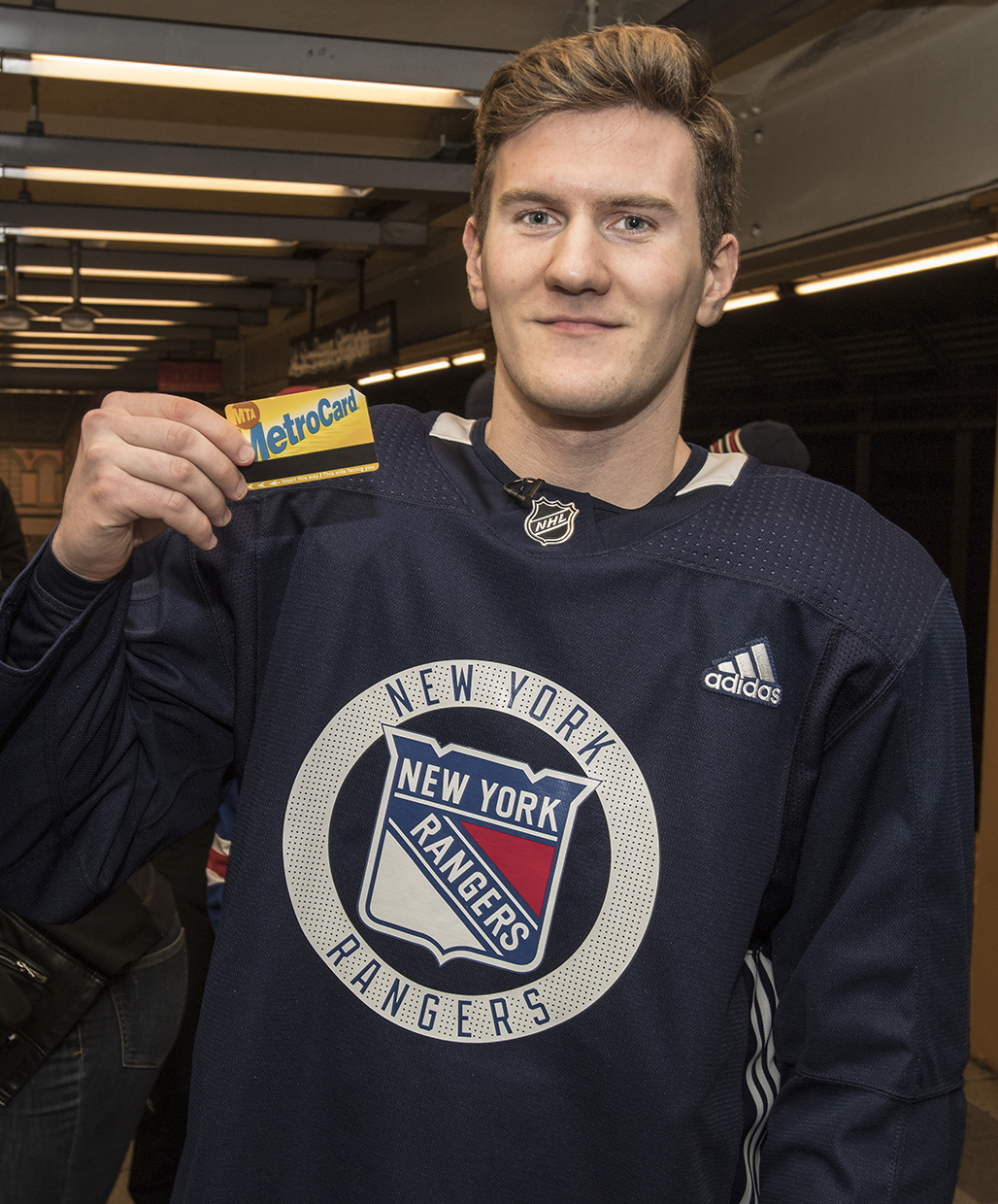
- Fox with the New York Rangers in 2019
- Born: February 17, 1998 (age 28) Jericho, New York, U.S.
- Height: 5 ft 11 in (180 cm)
- Weight: 185 lb (84 kg; 13 st 3 lb)
- Position: Defense
- Shoots: Right
- NHL team: New York Rangers
- National team: United States
- NHL draft: 66th overall, 2016; Calgary Flames
- Playing career: 2019–present

Adam Hunter Fox (born February 17, 1998) is an American professional ice hockey player who is a defenseman and alternate captain for the New York Rangers of the National Hockey League (NHL). Fox was selected by the Calgary Flames, 66th overall, in the 2016 NHL entry draft. In 2021, Fox won the James Norris Memorial Trophy as the NHL's best defenseman, joining Bobby Orr as the only two players in NHL history to win the award before their third NHL season.

He played two seasons in the U.S. National Team Development Program, and finished with the record for the most assists in a single season (in 2015–16) and the most assists in a career (in 2014–2016). He played collegiate ice hockey for Harvard University, leading all NCAA defensemen in the nation in assists and points in his freshman season, and leading all defensemen in the country in points per game and assists in his junior season. In June 2018, Calgary traded Fox's NHL rights to the Carolina Hurricanes, who traded them to the New York Rangers in April 2019. He left college a year early and made his NHL debut for the Rangers in 2019. In his rookie season, he tied for second among all NHL rookie defensemen in goals and was third in assists and points.

== Early life ==
Fox was born in Jericho, New York, to parents Bruce and Tammy Fox and is Jewish. His father was a New York Rangers season ticket holder. He has an older brother, Andrew, who is an investment banker. His nickname is "Foxy". He attended Jericho High School, and then Pioneer High School in Ann Arbor, Michigan, where he played hockey, soccer, and lacrosse.

== Playing career ==
=== Early career ===
Fox grew up playing for the Long Island Gulls of the Atlantic Youth Hockey League.

He played two seasons (2014–16) in the U.S. National Team Development Program (USNTDP) in Plymouth, Michigan. During his final season in the program, he led all under-18 defensemen in goals, assists, and points. He finished his career with the record for the most assists in a single-season (59; in 2015–16), the most assists in a career (86; in 2014–2016), and the third-most points by a defenseman in USNTDP history.

He was named the 2016 IIHF World U18 Championships Best Defenseman, to the 2016 U18 World Hockey Championships Media All-Star Team, and won a bronze medal at the 2016 Championships.

Leading up to the 2016 NHL entry draft, Fox was ranked 50th for North American Skaters in the final ranking by the NHL Central Scouting Bureau. He was drafted 66th overall by the Calgary Flames.

=== College ===
Fox attended Harvard University for three years, majoring in psychology. He had an immediate impact after joining Harvard Crimson men's ice hockey team for the 2016–17 season. He led all NCAA defensemen in the nation, and ranked 4th among NCAA freshmen skaters with 40 points, led all NCAA defensemen and all NCAA freshmen skaters in assists with 34, and led all ECAC skaters in both points and assists, as he played 35 games. He was named 2017 ECAC Rookie of the Year and Ivy League Rookie of the Year after his freshman season. In his freshman season, Fox helped Harvard win the Beanpot for the first time since 1993 by recording a goal and an assist to beat Boston University 6–3. Fox also helped Harvard reach its first Frozen Four series since 1994 and win an Ivy title and ECAC Hockey Championship. In the Frozen Four semifinals against University of Minnesota Duluth, the Crimson lost 2–1.

In his sophomore 2017–18 season, he had 28 points on six goals and 22 assists in 29 games. He was fifth in the nation among defensemen, averaging .97 points per game.

In his junior 2018–19 season, he had 48 points (9 goals, 39 assists) in 33 games for Harvard, and was the top scoring player and defenseman in the country with 1.45 points per game. He led the NCAA in assists and was fourth in points, while also setting school single-season records for assists and points by a defenseman. Fox broke the school record for points by a Harvard defenseman in one season, set by Mark Fusco in 1983. He was named a finalist for the Hobey Baker Award as the top player in college hockey, won the 2019 Walter Brown Award, and was an Academic All-Ivy honoree.

Fox was also named to the NCAA First All-American Team and ECAC First All-Star Team in each of his three seasons (2017–19). In 97 career games, he had 116 points (21 goals, 95 assists). He became the fourth defenseman in Harvard history to reach 100 career points. He left Harvard before his senior year to play in the NHL, when he was five classes short of graduating.

=== Professional ===
On June 23, 2018, the Calgary Flames traded Fox's NHL playing rights (along with Dougie Hamilton and Micheal Ferland) to the Carolina Hurricanes in exchange for Elias Lindholm and Noah Hanifin. Flames general manager Brad Treliving had expressed doubts about the team's chances of signing him.

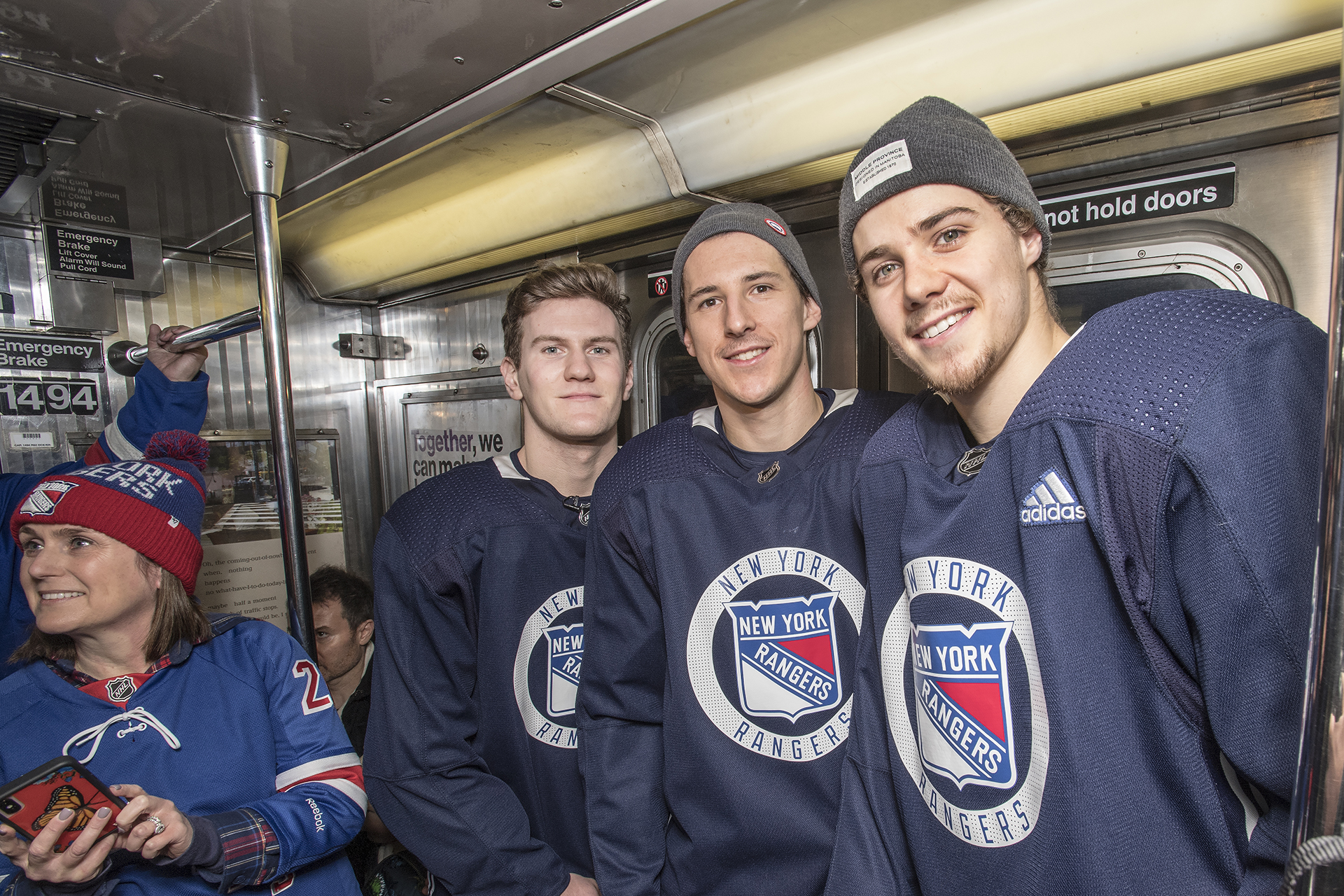
Fox, Ryan Strome, and Brett Howden riding the subway to Lasker Rink in Central Park

The likelihood that Fox would sign with the Hurricanes diminished with the team becoming a playoff contender with a surplus of quality defensemen and a clause in the NHL's collective bargaining agreement (CBA) allowing an NCAA player to return for his senior year and become a free agent upon graduation. Hurricanes owner Thomas Dundon expressed his pessimism over the matter by stating, "We'll try to trade him." On April 30, 2019, Carolina traded Fox's NHL rights to the New York Rangers in exchange for a second-round pick in the 2019 NHL entry draft and what would become a second-round pick in the 2020 NHL entry draft. On May 2, Fox signed an entry-level contract with the Rangers, with a maximum entry-level salary ($925,000 plus bonuses). He won the Lars-Erik Sjoberg Award as the top Ranger rookie in training camp in 2019, and made the Rangers' Opening Night roster.

He made his NHL debut in October 2019, at 21 years of age. He finished the 2019–20 season with 42 points (8 goals, 34 assists) in 70 games. He tied for second among all NHL rookie defensemen in goals, and third in points, assists, and PPP (13). He ranked first among Rangers defensemen in Goals Above Replacement (14.9) and Wins Above Replacement (2.7). He became the fifth rookie defenseman in franchise history to have at least 40 points in a season, joining Ron Greschner, Reijo Ruotsalainen, Brian Leetch, and Mike McEwen. Despite his rookie season success, Fox fell short of a Calder Memorial Trophy nomination.

During the 2020–21 season, on April 6, during a 8–4 win over the Pittsburgh Penguins, Fox became the fourth defenseman in Rangers history to record an 11-game point streak. His point streak ended on April 9 at 12 games. He also became the first Rangers defenseman to assist on 11-straight power play goals. On April 29, Fox was named the recipient of the Steven MacDonald Extra Effort Award. He was given the award for his outstanding defense and consistent play throughout the season. Fox was the first defenseman to win the award since Brian Leetch won in 1997. On June 29, Fox won the James Norris Memorial Trophy for the 2020–21 NHL season. Fox became only the second defenseman in NHL history to win the award before starting his third season. He is the youngest winner since then Montreal Canadiens defenseman P. K. Subban won it at the age of 23 in 2013, and is the first Rangers player to receive the honor since Brian Leetch in 1997. In a shortened 56-game schedule, Fox led all defensemen with 42 assists and was second in points with 47, behind Tyson Barrie of the Edmonton Oilers. In 55 games, he registered five goals, posted a plus-19 rating, averaged 24:42 of ice time per game, and finished with 23 power play points.

On November 1, 2021, Fox signed a seven-year, $66.5 million contract extension with the Rangers. In January 2022, Fox was chosen to his first NHL All-Star Game, which was held at T-Mobile Arena in Paradise, Nevada. After scoring two goals with an assist in a game against the Toronto Maple Leafs on January 19, Fox became the first Rangers defenseman to reach the 40-point mark in 40 games or fewer since Brian Leetch in the 2000–01 season. On November 6, during a game against the Calgary Flames, Fox was heavily booed by Flames fans whenever he touched the puck. He scored a goal at the end of the first period and started mocking fans, but the goal was called back because of an offside, Flames fans throughout the game started chanting "Fox you suck!", which was caused by Fox not wanting to sign an entry-level contract with the Flames, his draft team.

Fox was a Norris Trophy finalist for the second time for the 2022–23 season.

== International play ==
Medal record

Men's ice hockey

Representing the United States

World Junior Championships
Gold medal – first place	2017 Canada	
Bronze medal – third place	2018 United States	

World U18 Championships
Bronze medal – third place	2016 United States	

Fox has represented the United States junior team at both the 2017 and 2018 World Junior Championships.

In 2017, Fox won a gold medal with the United States, while recording four points in seven games. The following year, Fox was named an alternate captain at the 2018 World Junior Championships. He led the United States to a bronze medal, while leading the team's defensemen in assists and points.

Following the conclusion of his collegiate career, on April 19, 2019, Fox was selected to represent the United States senior team at the 2019 World Championship.

== Career statistics ==
=== Regular season and playoffs ===
			Regular season					Playoffs
Season	Team	League	GP	G	A	Pts	PIM	GP	G	A	Pts	PIM
2014–15	US NTDP Juniors	USHL	34	3	14	17	26	—	—	—	—	—
2014–15	US NTDP U17	USDP	54	4	23	27	40	—	—	—	—	—
2015–16	US NTDP Juniors	USHL	25	5	17	22	2	—	—	—	—	—
2015–16	US NTDP U18	USDP	64	9	50	59	12	—	—	—	—	—
2016–17	Harvard University	ECAC	35	6	34	40	6	—	—	—	—	—
2017–18	Harvard University	ECAC	29	6	22	28	12	—	—	—	—	—
2018–19	Harvard University	ECAC	33	9	39	48	14	—	—	—	—	—
2019–20	New York Rangers	NHL	70	8	34	42	32	3	0	0	0	2
2020–21	New York Rangers	NHL	55	5	42	47	14	—	—	—	—	—
2021–22	New York Rangers	NHL	78	11	63	74	26	20	5	18	23	2
2022–23	New York Rangers	NHL	82	12	60	72	34	7	0	8	8	16
2023–24	New York Rangers	NHL	72	17	56	73	36	16	0	8	8	8
2024–25	New York Rangers	NHL	74	10	51	61	32	—	—	—	—	—
2025–26	New York Rangers	NHL	55	9	43	52	20	—	—	—	—	—
NHL totals			486	72	349	421	194	46	5	34	39	28

=== International ===
Year	Team	Event	Result	GP	G	A	Pts	PIM
2014	United States	U17	2nd place, silver medalist(s)	6	0	2	2	0
2016	United States	WJC18	3rd place, bronze medalist(s)	7	1	8	9	0
2017	United States	WJC	1st place, gold medalist(s)	7	0	4	4	2
2018	United States	WJC	3rd place, bronze medalist(s)	7	1	4	5	0
2019	United States	WC	7th	8	0	1	1	0
2025	United States	4NF	2nd	4	0	0	0	4
Junior totals				27	2	18	20	2
Senior totals				12	0	1	1	4

== Awards and honors ==
Award	Year	Ref
College
ECAC Rookie of the Year	2017	
ECAC All-Rookie Team	2017	
ECAC First All-Star Team	2017, 2018, 2019	
ECAC All-Tournament Team	2017	
NCAA First All-American Team	2017, 2018, 2019	
NHL
James Norris Memorial Trophy	2021	
NHL First All-Star Team	2021, 2023	
NHL All-Star Game	2022, 2023	
NHL Second All-Star Team	2024	
International
World U18 Championship All-Star Team	2016	
World U18 Championship Best Defenseman	2016	
New York Rangers
Steven McDonald Extra Effort Award	2021	

== See also ==
- List of select Jewish ice hockey players

Awards and achievements
Preceded by Joe Snively	ECAC Hockey Rookie of the Year; 2016–17	Succeeded by Matthew Galajda
Preceded by Ryan Donato	ECAC Hockey Player of the Year; 2018–19	Succeeded by Morgan Barron
Preceded by Roman Josi	James Norris Memorial Trophy winner 2021	Succeeded by Cale Makar
