= Neil Smith (ice hockey) =

- Born: January 9, 1954 (age 72) Toronto, Ontario, Canada
- Height: 6 ft 2 in (188 cm)
- Weight: 195 lb (88 kg; 13 st 13 lb)
- Position: Defence
- Shot: Left
- Played for: IHL; Kalamazoo Wings; Saginaw Gears; Milwaukee Admirals; Muskegon Mohawks; Dayton Gems; NEHL; Cape Cod Freedoms; EHL; Hampton Aces
- NHL draft: 204th overall, 1974; New York Islanders
- Playing career: 1978–1980

Neil Smith (born January 9, 1954) is a Canadian ice hockey broadcaster, and previously the general manager of both the New York Rangers from 1989–2000 and (briefly) the New York Islanders in 2006. He was also the owner and head coach of the Johnstown Chiefs of the ECHL. He last was the president, general manager, and governor of the Greenville Road Warriors of the ECHL. He now is an on-air analyst for the NHL Network.

== Biography ==
=== Early career ===
Smith played junior hockey before attending Western Michigan University. As a freshman, he was selected to the All-American team as a defenceman, and was named team captain his sophomore season.

=== New York Islanders ===
He was drafted in 1974 by the New York Islanders as the first ever draft pick from WMU. He spent several seasons in the minor leagues before working for the organization as a talent scout. With Smith working in an important capacity for the Islanders minor league system, the Islanders' Central Hockey League affiliate, the Indianapolis Checkers (which at the time was the Islanders most prominent minor league team) won the Adams Cup in 1981–82. While on the Island, he worked closely with the Islanders chief scout and assistant GM, Jim Devellano.

=== Detroit Red Wings ===
When Devellano was contacted by the new owner of the Detroit Red Wings, Mike Ilitch, to become GM in the summer of 1982, Smith moved with Devellano to the Red Wings. Smith won two Calder Cup championships as the general manager of the team's minor league affiliate, the Adirondack Red Wings in 1985–86 and 1988–89.

During the 1988 Stanley Cup Playoffs, Smith and assistant coach Colin Campbell discovered several Red Wings players, including Bob Probert and Petr Klima, out past curfew. The incident occurred at a suburban Edmonton bar called "Goose Loonies", and led to an apology being issued by Red Wings head coach Jacques Demers. Smith would later hire Campbell as head coach of the New York Rangers in 1994.

=== New York Rangers ===
Smith was hired by the Rangers in 1989 to be their general manager, inheriting a team that included future stars Brian Leetch and Mike Richter. Under Smith's watch, the Rangers groomed Tony Amonte. Smith was also responsible for drafting star players such as Sergei Nemchinov, Alexei Kovalev, Doug Weight, and Sergei Zubov before he made his mark in 1991 with a blockbuster trade for superstar Mark Messier, who was immediately given the captaincy by the Rangers organization. Over the next three seasons, Smith continued to shape the team through trades and free-agent signings, acquiring several players from the Edmonton Oilers dynasty of the 1980s, including Kevin Lowe, Adam Graves, Esa Tikkanen, Jeff Beukeboom, Craig MacTavish, Glenn Anderson, Jari Kurri, and Marty McSorley.

Messier became one of the most popular athletes in New York, winning the Hart Memorial Trophy in 1992, and the Rangers grew into an elite team. The Rangers won the Presidents' Trophy as the team with the NHL's best regular season record twice, and in 1994 won their long-awaited fourth Stanley Cup championship. Neil Smith remains the only GM in the modern era to win a Stanley Cup with the Rangers.

==== Decline ====
The next few years saw the team struggle to stay in contention, but having traded away many of its prospects for the Stanley Cup run, the team had to increasingly rely on aging veterans acquired through expensive free agency. A major dispute between Smith and hard-driving coach Mike Keenan ended when Keenan left for the St. Louis Blues after the championship season. Unfortunately, none of the coaches that succeeded Keenan could motivate the highly-paid stars who played for the Rangers in the mid to late 1990s.

Attempting to once more bring in an older superstar to re-ignite the magic of 1994, Smith signed Wayne Gretzky in 1996, reuniting him with his old Oilers teammate Messier. During the 1996–97 playoffs the Rangers earned their way into the Eastern Conference Final, where they were beaten by a bigger and younger Philadelphia Flyers squad. The reunion would last only a year, however, as Messier left amid an acrimonious dispute with the organization.

With Messier's departure the Rangers sank into mediocrity; though Smith acquired a succession of veteran players with expensive contracts and drafted a host of promising young players, the team continued to underperform and miss the playoffs, and Smith was fired before the conclusion of the 1999-2000 season. Smith's replacement as general manager, Glen Sather, also continued Smith's trend of signing numerous aging players who underperformed their high salaries, including bringing back fan favorite Messier. The Rangers did not again reach the playoffs again until 2006, nor did they win another playoff series, or a single postseason game until a decade later when they swept the Atlanta Thrashers during the Eastern Conference Quarterfinals in 2007.

=== New York Islanders (second stint) ===
On June 8, 2006, Smith was introduced as the New York Islanders' general manager, making him the only person in NHL history to serve as general manager with both New York teams. Smith stated, "Knowing that I'll be working in the same office where one of my mentors, Bill Torrey, created a dynasty is an unbelievable feeling. Al Arbour, whom I owe everything to, gave me my first hockey job as an advance scout. I wear my Islanders Stanley Cup ring with immense pride. To be able to come full circle and return home to the Islanders is a dream." On July 18, 2006, before the season began, Smith was fired and replaced by Islanders goaltender Garth Snow, who retired from his playing position on the team upon being hired.

Smith reportedly had grown frustrated with his lack of authority on personnel and staffing decisions, as owner Charles Wang had at that time instituted a setup where decisions were made collectively by a group of advisors rather than by the general manager alone. Wang believed that Smith was incapable of fitting within this model and subsequently fired him. Pat LaFontaine, who had recently been hired by the team as a senior adviser, quit his post the same day in reaction to the firing of Smith. Smith was named as an assistant to Dallas Stars general manager Doug Armstrong shortly after being let go by the Islanders, October 27, 2006.

=== Broadcasting ===
Smith has spent time broadcasting NHL games for various networks, and has also done some studio work. Smith has worked for ESPN, TSN, Versus and NHL Network.

Neil Smith has also served as a guest host on Hockey Night in Canada Radio on Sirius offering his insight alongside host Jeff Marek.

== Honors ==
- 1981–82 Adams Cup Championship (CHL) Indianapolis Checkers
- 1985–86 Calder Cup Championship (AHL) Adirondack Red Wings
- 1988–89 Calder Cup Championship (AHL) Adirondack Red Wings
- In 1991, Smith was inducted into the Western Michigan University Hall of Fame
- 1991–92 Executive of the Year by The Hockey News
- 1993–94 Executive of the Year by The Sporting News
- 1993–94 Stanley Cup Championship New York Rangers

== Present ==
Smith was also the owner and governor of the Johnstown Chiefs hockey team. He also served as the team's head coach. In 2010, Johnstown relocated their franchise to Greenville, SC. The franchise now serves as a Carolina Hurricanes affiliate, the Greenville Swamp Rabbits.

Preceded by Phil Esposito	General Manager of the New York Rangers; 1989–2000	Succeeded by Glen Sather
Preceded by Mike Milbury	General Manager of the New York Islanders; 2006	Succeeded by Garth Snow
Preceded by Jeff Flanagan	Head coach of the Johnstown Chiefs; 2009-2010	Succeeded by final coach
