= John Halligan (ice hockey) =

John Halligan (February 25, 1941 - January 20, 2010) was a public relations director with the New York Rangers (Rangers) and later an executive with the National Hockey League (NHL).

Halligan was a lifelong NHL contributor who received the Lester Patrick Trophy in 2007, an award he helped to create.

"He loved the stories of the game and, over his decades in hockey, told those stories with an abiding respect for the history – and humour – so that future generations of fans could enjoy them as much as he did," NHL commissioner Gary Bettman said at the time of Halligan's death.

Halligan graduated from Fordham Preparatory School in 1959 and Fordham University in 1963, joining the Rangers organization, in Manhattan, in 1963. His duties were aimed at getting as many stories on the team as possible into city newspapers.

Halligan left the Rangers to work in the NHL head offices, also located in Manhattan, in 1983. He returned to the Rangers in 1986, then went back to the NHL in 1990, staying there until his retirement in 2006.

Halligan authored several books on hockey:

- New York Rangers: Seventy-Five Years (Barnes & Noble, 2000)
- The New York Rangers (Images of Sports) (Arcadia Publishing, 2003)
- Game of My Life: New York Rangers (Sports Publishing, 2006)
- 100 Ranger Greats: Superstars, Unsung Heroes and Colorful Characters (2009), co-authored with Russ Cohen and Adam Raider
