= Johan Lindbom =

Swedish ice hockey player

- Born: July 8, 1971 (age 54) Alvesta, Sweden
- Height: 6 ft 2 in (188 cm)
- Weight: 188 lb (85 kg; 13 st 6 lb)
- Position: Right wing
- Shot: Left
- Played for: HV71; New York Rangers
- National team: Sweden
- NHL draft: 134th overall, 1997; New York Rangers
- Playing career: 1994–2001

Johan Stig Mikael Lindbom (born July 8, 1971) is a former Swedish professional ice hockey player who played 38 games in the National Hockey League (NHL) with the New York Rangers.

== Career statistics ==
| | | | Regular season | | | | | Playoffs |
| Season | Team | League | GP | G | A | Pts | PIM | GP | G | A | Pts | PIM |
|---|---|---|---|---|---|---|---|---|---|---|---|---|
| 1988–89 | Alvesta SK | Division 2 | 25 | 3 | 5 | 8 | — | — | — | — | — | — |
| 1989–90 | Alvesta SK | Division 2 | 35 | 22 | 10 | 32 | 42 | — | — | — | — | — |
| 1990–91 | Tyringe SoSS | Division 1 | 25 | 9 | 6 | 15 | 26 | — | — | — | — | — |
| 1991–92 | Tyringe SoSS | Division 1 | 30 | 10 | 11 | 21 | 68 | — | — | — | — | — |
| 1992–93 | IF Troja/Ljungby | Division 1 | 30 | 10 | 16 | 26 | 20 | 10 | 6 | 3 | 9 | 18 |
| 1993–94 | IF Troja/Ljungby | Division 1 | 33 | 16 | 11 | 27 | 30 | 11 | 6 | 6 | 12 | 2 |
| 1994–95 | HV71 | SHL | 39 | 9 | 7 | 16 | 30 | 13 | 2 | 5 | 7 | 12 |
| 1995–96 | HV71 | SHL | 37 | 12 | 14 | 26 | 30 | 4 | 0 | 0 | 0 | 4 |
| 1996–97 | HV71 | SHL | 49 | 20 | 14 | 34 | 26 | 5 | 1 | 0 | 1 | 6 |
| 1997–98 | New York Rangers | NHL | 38 | 1 | 3 | 4 | 28 | — | — | — | — | — |
| 1997–98 | Hartford Wolf Pack | AHL | 7 | 1 | 5 | 6 | 6 | — | — | — | — | — |
| 1998–99 | HV71 | SHL | 49 | 9 | 17 | 26 | 40 | — | — | — | — | — |
| 1999–00 | HV71 | SHL | 31 | 4 | 5 | 9 | 28 | 4 | 1 | 1 | 2 | 2 |
| 2000–01 | HV71 | SHL | 21 | 1 | 5 | 6 | 26 | — | — | — | — | — |
| NHL totals | | | 38 | 1 | 3 | 4 | 28 | — | — | — | — | — |
| SHL totals | | | 226 | 55 | 62 | 117 | 180 | 26 | 4 | 6 | 10 | 24 |
