= Sergei Nemchinov =

Russian ice hockey player (born 1964)

- Born: 14 January 1964 (age 62) Moscow, Soviet Union
- Height: 6 ft 0 in (183 cm)
- Weight: 200 lb (91 kg; 14 st 4 lb)
- Position: Centre
- Shot: Left
- Played for: PHC Krylya Sovetov; HC CSKA Moscow; New York Rangers; Vancouver Canucks; New York Islanders; New Jersey Devils; Lokomotiv Yaroslavl
- National team: Soviet Union and Russia
- NHL draft: 244th overall, 1990; New York Rangers
- Playing career: 1981–2004

Olympic medal record

Representing Russia

Men's ice hockey
Silver medal – second place	1998 Nagano	Team

Sergei Lvovich Nemchinov (Russian: Серге́й Львович Немчинов; born 14 January 1964) is a Russian former professional ice hockey player who played in the National Hockey League (NHL) for the New York Rangers, Vancouver Canucks, New York Islanders and the New Jersey Devils for twelve seasons, bookended by ten seasons in the Soviet Championship League with PHC Krylya Sovetov and HC CSKA Moscow, and two in the Russian Superleague with Lokomotiv Yaroslavl. Nemchinov works in the Admiral Vladivostok.

== Playing career ==
Nemchinov was one of the last picks of the 1990 NHL entry draft when he was selected in the 12th round, 244th overall by the Rangers. He went on to play in 761 regular season games in his NHL career, scoring 152 goals and 193 assists for 345 points, picking up 251 penalty minutes. He won the Stanley Cup with the Rangers in 1994 and again with the Devils in 2000. In 1994, Nemchinov, along with Alexander Karpovtsev, Alexei Kovalev, and Sergei Zubov were the first Russians to have their names engraved on the Stanley Cup. He returned to Russia in 2002 and played there until his retirement in 2004.

== Coaching career ==
Nemchinov was the general manager of HC CSKA Moscow from 2009 to 2011. Nemchinov has also coached the Russia men's national junior ice hockey team. In 2019 he joined the South Korean men's national ice hockey team as an assistant coach.

During his visit to Ashgabat, Turkmenistan Sergei Nemchinov from August 30 to September 7 conducted intensive training with the Turkmenistan men's national ice hockey team. Then he entered the coaching staff of the national team of Turkmenistan and has already drawn up a plan for preparing Turkmen hockey players for the 2020 IIHF World Championship Division III.

In March 2020, he was appointed to the post of sports director of Admiral Vladivostok.

== Awards and achievements ==
- 1993-94 – Stanley Cup champion – New York Rangers
- 1999-00 – Stanley Cup champion – New Jersey Devils
- In the 2009 book 100 Ranger Greats, was ranked No. 46 all-time of the 901 New York Rangers who had played during the team's first 82 seasons

== Career statistics ==
=== Regular season and playoffs ===
			Regular season					Playoffs
Season	Team	League	GP	G	A	Pts	PIM	GP	G	A	Pts	PIM
1981–82	Krylya Sovetov Moscow	USSR	15	1	0	1	0	—	—	—	—	—
1981–82	Lokomotiv Moscow	USSR II	6	1	0	1	0	—	—	—	—	—
1982–83	CSKA Moscow	USSR	11	0	0	0	2	—	—	—	—	—
1983–84	CSKA Moscow	USSR	20	6	5	11	4	—	—	—	—	—
1984–85	CSKA Moscow	USSR	31	2	4	6	4	—	—	—	—	—
1985–86	Krylya Sovetov Moscow	USSR	39	7	12	19	28	—	—	—	—	—
1986–87	Krylya Sovetov Moscow	USSR	40	13	9	22	24	—	—	—	—	—
1987–88	Krylya Sovetov Moscow	USSR	48	17	11	28	26	—	—	—	—	—
1988–89	Krylya Sovetov Moscow	USSR	43	15	14	29	28	—	—	—	—	—
1989–90	Krylya Sovetov Moscow	USSR	48	17	17	34	34	—	—	—	—	—
1990–91	Krylya Sovetov Moscow	USSR	46	21	24	45	30	—	—	—	—	—
1991–92	New York Rangers	NHL	73	30	28	58	15	13	1	4	5	8
1992–93	New York Rangers	NHL	81	23	31	54	34	—	—	—	—	—
1993–94	New York Rangers	NHL	76	22	27	49	36	23	2	5	7	6
1994–95	New York Rangers	NHL	47	7	6	13	16	10	4	5	9	2
1995–96	New York Rangers	NHL	78	17	15	32	38	6	0	1	1	2
1996–97	New York Rangers	NHL	63	6	13	19	12	—	—	—	—	—
1996–97	Vancouver Canucks	NHL	6	2	3	5	4	—	—	—	—	—
1997–98	New York Islanders	NHL	74	10	19	29	24	—	—	—	—	—
1998–99	New York Islanders	NHL	67	8	8	16	22	—	—	—	—	—
1998–99	New Jersey Devils	NHL	10	4	0	4	6	4	0	0	0	0
1999–2000	New Jersey Devils	NHL	53	10	16	26	18	21	3	2	5	2
2000–01	New Jersey Devils	NHL	65	8	22	30	16	25	1	3	4	4
2001–02	New Jersey Devils	NHL	68	5	5	10	10	3	0	0	0	0
2002–03	Lokomotiv Yaroslavl	RSL	27	5	6	11	26	10	0	5	5	10
2003–04	Lokomotiv Yaroslavl	RSL	54	5	19	24	38	3	0	0	0	4
USSR totals			341	99	96	195	180	—	—	—	—	—
NHL totals			761	152	193	345	251	105	11	20	31	24

=== International ===
Year	Team	Event	Place	GP	G	A	Pts	PIM
1982	Soviet Union	EJC	3rd place, bronze medalist(s)	5	4	2	6	4
1983	Soviet Union	WJC	1st place, gold medalist(s)	7	4	3	7	2
1984	Soviet Union	WJC	1st place, gold medalist(s)	7	5	6	11	2
1987	Soviet Union	CC	2nd place, silver medalist(s)	5	0	0	0	6
1989	Soviet Union	WC	1st place, gold medalist(s)	7	2	0	2	2
1990	Soviet Union	WC	1st place, gold medalist(s)	10	5	2	7	4
1991	Soviet Union	WC	3rd place, bronze medalist(s)	10	2	3	5	2
1996	Russia	WCH	SF	5	1	2	3	2
1998	Russia	OG	2nd place, silver medalist(s)	6	1	0	1	0
1998	Russia	WC	5th	6	0	1	1	8
Junior totals				19	13	11	24	8
Senior totals				49	11	8	19	24

== Transactions ==
- Traded by the New York Rangers with Brian Noonan to the Vancouver Canucks for Esa Tikkanen and Russ Courtnall. March 8, 1997.
- Signed as a free agent with the New York Islanders. July 10, 1997.
- Traded by the New York Islanders to the New Jersey Devils for New Jersey's 4th round choice (Daniel Johansson) in the 1999 NHL entry draft. March 22, 1999.
