= Alexander Karpovtsev =

Russian ice hockey player (1970–2011)

- Born: April 7, 1970 Moscow, Russian SFSR, Soviet Union
- Died: September 7, 2011 (aged 41) Yaroslavl, Russia
- Height: 6 ft 2 in (188 cm)
- Weight: 200 lb (91 kg; 14 st 4 lb)
- Position: Defence
- Shot: Right
- Played for: Dynamo Moscow; New York Rangers; Toronto Maple Leafs; Chicago Blackhawks; New York Islanders; Sibir Novosibirsk; Lokomotiv Yaroslavl; Florida Panthers; Avangard Omsk
- National team: Soviet Union and Russia
- NHL draft: 158th overall, 1990; Quebec Nordiques
- Playing career: 1987–2007

Alexander Georgievich Karpovtsev (Russian: Александр Георгиевич Карповцев; April 7, 1970 – September 7, 2011) was a Russian ice hockey player and an assistant coach for Ak Bars Kazan and Lokomotiv Yaroslavl of the Kontinental Hockey League (KHL). In the National Hockey League (NHL), he played for the New York Rangers, Toronto Maple Leafs, Chicago Blackhawks, New York Islanders, and Florida Panthers. He, Alexei Kovalev, Sergei Zubov and Sergei Nemchinov were the first Russian players to have their names engraved on the Stanley Cup, winning it in 1994 with the Rangers. He was traded by the Maple Leafs to the Blackhawks for Bryan McCabe after a contract dispute where Karpovstev was seeking a salary that would have made him the highest paid defender on the team.

Karpovtsev, while an assistant coach for Lokomotiv Yaroslavl, died in the 2011 Lokomotiv Yaroslavl plane crash.

== Personal life ==
Alexander Karpovtsev was married to Janna Karpovtsev. At the time of his death, Karpovtsev was married to Diana; they had a daughter and a son, Egor, born in January 2012.

== Death ==
On September 7, 2011, Karpovtsev was killed when a Yakovlev Yak-42 passenger aircraft, carrying nearly his entire Lokomotiv team, crashed just outside Yaroslavl, Russia. The team was traveling to Minsk to play their opening game of the season, with its coaching staff and prospects. Lokomotiv officials said "'everyone from the main roster was on the plane plus four players from the youth team.'"

== Career statistics ==
=== Regular season and playoffs ===
| | | | Regular season | | | | | Playoffs |
| Season | Team | League | GP | G | A | Pts | PIM | GP | G | A | Pts | PIM |
|---|---|---|---|---|---|---|---|---|---|---|---|---|
| 1987–88 | Dynamo Moscow | USSR | 2 | 0 | 1 | 1 | 0 | — | — | — | — | — |
| 1988–89 | MCOP Moscow | USSR-3 | 11 | 0 | 0 | 0 | 0 | — | — | — | — | — |
| 1989–90 | Dynamo Moscow | USSR | 35 | 1 | 1 | 2 | 27 | — | — | — | — | — |
| 1989–90 | Dynamo–2 Moscow | USSR-3 | 11 | 0 | 1 | 1 | 8 | — | — | — | — | — |
| 1990–91 | Dynamo Moscow | USSR | 40 | 0 | 5 | 5 | 15 | — | — | — | — | — |
| 1990–91 | Dynamo–2 Moscow | USSR-3 | 6 | 0 | 0 | 0 | 2 | — | — | — | — | — |
| 1991–92 | Dynamo Moscow | CIS | 28 | 3 | 2 | 5 | 22 | 7 | 1 | 0 | 1 | 2 |
| 1991–92 | Dynamo–2 Moscow | CIS-3 | 3 | 0 | 1 | 1 | 4 | — | — | — | — | — |
| 1992–93 | Dynamo Moscow | RUS | 36 | 3 | 11 | 14 | 100 | 7 | 2 | 1 | 3 | 0 |
| 1993–94 | Dynamo Moscow | RUS | 3 | 0 | 0 | 0 | 6 | — | — | — | — | — |
| 1993–94 | New York Rangers | NHL | 67 | 3 | 15 | 18 | 58 | 17 | 0 | 4 | 4 | 12 |
| 1994–95 | Dynamo Moscow | RUS | 13 | 0 | 2 | 2 | 10 | — | — | — | — | — |
| 1994–95 | New York Rangers | NHL | 47 | 4 | 8 | 12 | 30 | 8 | 1 | 0 | 1 | 0 |
| 1995–96 | New York Rangers | NHL | 40 | 2 | 16 | 18 | 26 | 6 | 0 | 1 | 1 | 4 |
| 1996–97 | New York Rangers | NHL | 77 | 9 | 29 | 38 | 59 | 13 | 1 | 3 | 4 | 20 |
| 1997–98 | New York Rangers | NHL | 47 | 3 | 7 | 10 | 48 | — | — | — | — | — |
| 1998–99 | New York Rangers | NHL | 2 | 1 | 0 | 1 | 0 | — | — | — | — | — |
| 1998–99 | Toronto Maple Leafs | NHL | 56 | 2 | 25 | 27 | 52 | 14 | 1 | 3 | 4 | 12 |
| 1999–00 | Toronto Maple Leafs | NHL | 69 | 3 | 14 | 17 | 54 | 11 | 0 | 3 | 3 | 4 |
| 2000–01 | Dynamo Moscow | RSL | 5 | 0 | 1 | 1 | 0 | — | — | — | — | — |
| 2000–01 | Chicago Blackhawks | NHL | 53 | 2 | 13 | 15 | 39 | — | — | — | — | — |
| 2001–02 | Chicago Blackhawks | NHL | 65 | 1 | 9 | 10 | 40 | 5 | 1 | 0 | 1 | 0 |
| 2002–03 | Chicago Blackhawks | NHL | 40 | 4 | 10 | 14 | 12 | — | — | — | — | — |
| 2003–04 | Chicago Blackhawks | NHL | 24 | 0 | 7 | 7 | 14 | — | — | — | — | — |
| 2003–04 | New York Islanders | NHL | 3 | 0 | 1 | 1 | 4 | — | — | — | — | — |
| 2004–05 | Sibir Novosibirsk | RSL | 5 | 0 | 1 | 1 | 16 | — | — | — | — | — |
| 2004–05 | Lokomotiv Yaroslavl | RSL | 33 | 2 | 5 | 7 | 45 | 9 | 0 | 0 | 0 | 0 |
| 2004–05 | Lokomotiv–2 Yaroslavl | RUS-3 | 2 | 0 | 2 | 2 | 0 | — | — | — | — | — |
| 2005–06 | Florida Panthers | NHL | 6 | 0 | 0 | 0 | 4 | — | — | — | — | — |
| 2005–06 | Sibir Novosibirsk | RSL | 18 | 2 | 1 | 3 | 39 | 3 | 0 | 0 | 0 | 4 |
| 2006–07 | Sibir Novosibirsk | RSL | 39 | 5 | 12 | 17 | 90 | 7 | 1 | 2 | 3 | 8 |
| 2007–08 | Sibir Novosibirsk | RSL | 6 | 0 | 2 | 2 | 27 | — | — | — | — | — |
| 2007–08 | Avangard Omsk | RSL | 8 | 1 | 0 | 1 | 10 | — | — | — | — | — |
| 2007–08 | Avangard–2 Omsk | RUS-3 | 2 | 2 | 1 | 3 | 0 | — | — | — | — | — |
| NHL totals | | | 596 | 34 | 154 | 188 | 430 | 74 | 4 | 14 | 18 | 52 |

=== International ===
| Year | Team | Event | GP | G | A | Pts | PIM |
|---|---|---|---|---|---|---|---|
| 1988 | Soviet Union | EJC | 6 | 0 | 2 | 2 | 4 |
| 1990 | Soviet Union | WJC | 7 | 0 | 1 | 1 | 8 |
| 1993 | Russia | WC | 8 | 0 | 1 | 1 | 10 |
| 1996 | Russia | WCH | 1 | 0 | 0 | 0 | 0 |
| 2005 | Russia | WC | 8 | 0 | 1 | 1 | 2 |
| Junior totals | | | 13 | 0 | 3 | 3 | 12 |
| Senior totals | | | 17 | 0 | 2 | 2 | 12 |

== Transactions ==
- September 7. 1993– Traded by the Quebec Nordiques to the New York Rangers in exchange for Mike Hurlbut.
- October 14, 1998– Traded by the New York Rangers, along with the Rangers' 1999 fourth-round draft choice, to the Toronto Maple Leafs in exchange for Mathieu Schneider.
- October 2, 2000– Traded by the Toronto Maple Leafs, along with Toronto's 2001 fourth-round draft choice, to the Chicago Blackhawks in exchange for Bryan McCabe.
- March 9, 2004– Traded by the Chicago Blackhawks to the New York Islanders in exchange for New York's 2005 fourth-round draft choice (Niklas Hjalmarsson).
- July 14, 2004– Signed as a free agent with the Florida Panthers.
