= 1994–95 Pittsburgh Penguins season =

NHL team season

1994–95 Pittsburgh Penguins
- Division: 2nd Northeast
- Conference: 3rd Eastern
- 1994–95 record: 29–16–3
- Home record: 18–5–1
- Road record: 11–11–2
- Goals for: 181
- Goals against: 158

Team information
- General manager: Craig Patrick
- Coach: Eddie Johnston
- Captain: Ron Francis
- Alternate captains: Ulf Samuelsson; Kevin Stevens
- Arena: Pittsburgh Civic Arena
- Average attendance: 16,108
- Minor league affiliate: Cleveland Lumberjacks

Team leaders
- Goals: Jaromir Jagr (32)
- Assists: Ron Francis (48)
- Points: Jaromir Jagr (70)
- Penalty minutes: Francois Leroux (114)
- Plus/minus: Ron Francis (+30)
- Wins: Ken Wregget (25)
- Goals against average: Ken Wregget (3.21)

Despite the absence of Mario Lemieux, the 1994–95 Pittsburgh Penguins started the season off strong, by winning their first seven games. They remained undefeated in their first 13 games, going 12–0–1. However, after a dominant start to the season, the Penguins had a mediocre record in their final 35 games, going 17–16–2. Jaromir Jagr won the Art Ross Trophy for most points (70), captain Ron Francis led the league in assists (48) and plus/minus (+30), and goaltender Ken Wregget led the league in wins (25). In a 7–3 Penguins' win over the Florida Panthers on February 7, Joe Mullen recorded an assist and became the first American-born NHL player to reach 1,000 points. Nine days later, Luc Robitaille scored four goals in a 5–2 Penguins win over the Hartford Whalers.

== Regular season ==
The Penguins had the highest shooting percentage in the NHL during the regular season, scoring 181 goals on just 1,400 shots (12.9%).

=== Final standings ===
Northeast Division
No.	CR		GP	W	L	T	GF	GA	Pts
1	1	**Quebec Nordiques**	48	30	13	5	185	134	65
2	3	**Pittsburgh Penguins**	48	29	16	3	181	158	61
3	4	**Boston Bruins**	48	27	18	3	150	127	57
4	7	**Buffalo Sabres**	48	22	19	7	130	119	51
5	10	Hartford Whalers	48	19	24	5	127	141	43
6	11	Montreal Canadiens	48	18	23	7	125	148	43
7	14	Ottawa Senators	48	9	34	5	117	174	23

Eastern Conference
R		Div	GP	W	L	T	GF	GA	Pts
**1**	**Quebec Nordiques**	**NE**	**48**	**30**	**13**	**5**	**185**	**134**	65
**2**	**Philadelphia Flyers**	**AT**	**48**	**28**	**16**	**4**	**150**	**132**	60
**3**	**Pittsburgh Penguins**	**NE**	**48**	**29**	**16**	**3**	**181**	**158**	61
**4**	**Boston Bruins**	**NE**	**48**	**27**	**18**	**3**	**150**	**127**	57
**5**	**New Jersey Devils**	**AT**	**48**	**22**	**18**	**8**	**136**	**121**	52
**6**	**Washington Capitals**	**AT**	**48**	**22**	**18**	**8**	**136**	**120**	52
**7**	**Buffalo Sabres**	**NE**	**48**	**22**	**19**	**7**	**130**	**119**	51
**8**	**New York Rangers**	**AT**	**48**	**22**	**23**	**3**	**139**	**134**	47
9	Florida Panthers	AT	48	20	22	6	115	127	46
10	Hartford Whalers	NE	48	19	24	5	127	141	43
11	Montreal Canadiens	NE	48	18	23	7	125	148	43
12	Tampa Bay Lightning	AT	48	17	28	3	120	144	37
13	New York Islanders	AT	48	15	28	5	126	158	35
14	Ottawa Senators	NE	48	9	34	5	117	174	23

Divisions: AT – Atlantic, NE – Northeast

bold – Qualified for playoffs

== Playoffs ==
Despite finding themselves in a three-games-to-one series deficit against the Washington Capitals in the first round of the playoffs, the Penguins won Game 5 at home in overtime, 6–5, via Luc Robitaille's goal at 4:30 of the first overtime period. Peter Bondra, Dale Hunter, Jaromir Jagr and Kevin Stevens each scored twice in the game. Pittsburgh went on to win Game 6 in Washington, 7–1, and then closed out the series at home with a 3–0 victory in Game 7. It was the second time in four years that the Penguins had come back to defeat the Capitals after being down three games to one. The Penguins faced the New Jersey Devils in the second round, and won the opening game, 3–2. With only 1:15 remaining in Game 2, Jaromir Jagr tied the game at 2–2. The game seemed certain to head to overtime until a breakaway-goal by Devils captain Scott Stevens with just 29 seconds remaining. Claude Lemieux added an empty-net goal and the Devils tied the series with a 4–2 win. In the final three games of the series, the Penguins managed to score only three goals and were ultimately eliminated at home in Game 5, 4–1. The Devils would go on to win their first Stanley Cup.

== Schedule and results ==
=== Regular season ===
1994–95 regular season
January: 5–0–0 (home: 1–0–0; road: 4–0–0), 10 points

#	Date	Visitor	Score	Home	Record	Points	Recap
1	Jan 20	Pittsburgh Penguins	5–3	Tampa Bay Lightning	1–0–0	2	W
2	Jan 23	Pittsburgh Penguins	6–5	Florida Panthers	2–0–0	4	W
3	Jan 25	Pittsburgh Penguins	3–2	New York Rangers	3–0–0	6	W
4	Jan 27	Ottawa Senators	4–5	Pittsburgh Penguins	4–0–0	8	W
5	Jan 29	Pittsburgh Penguins	4–1	Washington Capitals	5–0–0	10	W

February: 9–3–2 (home: 7–1–1; road: 2–2–1), 20 points

#	Date	Visitor	Score	Home	Record	Points	Recap
6	Feb 1	New York Rangers	3–4	Pittsburgh Penguins	6–0–0	12	W
7	Feb 4	Tampa Bay Lightning	3–6	Pittsburgh Penguins	7–0–0	14	W
8	Feb 5	Pittsburgh Penguins	3–3 OT	New Jersey Devils	7–0–1	15	T
9	Feb 7	Florida Panthers	3–7	Pittsburgh Penguins	8–0–1	17	W
10	Feb 9	Pittsburgh Penguins	5–2	New York Islanders	9–0–1	19	W
11	Feb 11	Montreal Canadiens	1–3	Pittsburgh Penguins	10–0–1	21	W
12	Feb 14	Boston Bruins	3–5	Pittsburgh Penguins	11–0–1	23	W
13	Feb 16	Hartford Whalers	2–5	Pittsburgh Penguins	12–0–1	25	W
14	Feb 18	Pittsburgh Penguins	2–4	Hartford Whalers	12–1–1	25	L
15	Feb 19	Buffalo Sabres	3–3 OT	Pittsburgh Penguins	12–1–2	26	T
16	Feb 21	Quebec Nordiques	4–5	Pittsburgh Penguins	13–1–2	28	W
17	Feb 24	Tampa Bay Lightning	4–2	Pittsburgh Penguins	13–2–2	28	L
18	Feb 25	Pittsburgh Penguins	1–3	New York Islanders	13–3–2	28	L
19	Feb 27	Pittsburgh Penguins	7–5	Quebec Nordiques	14–3–2	30	W

March: 8–6–0 (home: 5–1–0; road: 3–5–0), 16 points

#	Date	Visitor	Score	Home	Record	Points	Recap
20	Mar 2	Pittsburgh Penguins	3–6	Buffalo Sabres	14–4–2	30	L
21	Mar 4	Pittsburgh Penguins	4–3 OT	Boston Bruins	15–4–2	32	W
22	Mar 5	Pittsburgh Penguins	2–6	Philadelphia Flyers	15–5–2	32	L
23	Mar 7	Quebec Nordiques	5–4	Pittsburgh Penguins	15–6–2	32	L
24	Mar 9	New York Islanders	2–4	Pittsburgh Penguins	16–6–2	34	W
25	Mar 11	Buffalo Sabres	2–6	Pittsburgh Penguins	17–6–2	36	W
26	Mar 13	Montreal Canadiens	2–4	Pittsburgh Penguins	18–6–2	38	W
27	Mar 15	Pittsburgh Penguins	5–8	Montreal Canadiens	18–7–2	38	L
28	Mar 16	Pittsburgh Penguins	2–3	Quebec Nordiques	18–8–2	38	L
29	Mar 19	Pittsburgh Penguins	4–3	Ottawa Senators	19–8–2	40	W
30	Mar 21	Pittsburgh Penguins	3–2	Buffalo Sabres	20–8–2	42	W
31	Mar 24	New Jersey Devils	2–5	Pittsburgh Penguins	21–8–2	44	W
32	Mar 26	Pittsburgh Penguins	0–2	Florida Panthers	21–9–2	44	L
33	Mar 28	New York Islanders	3–6	Pittsburgh Penguins	22–9–2	46	W

April: 7–5–1 (home: 5–2–0; road: 2–3–1), 15 points

#	Date	Visitor	Score	Home	Record	Points	Recap
34	Apr 1	Philadelphia Flyers	2–3	Pittsburgh Penguins	23–9–2	48	W
35	Apr 5	Hartford Whalers	8–4	Pittsburgh Penguins	23–10–2	48	L
36	Apr 8	Pittsburgh Penguins	1–2	Montreal Canadiens	23–11–2	48	L
37	Apr 10	Pittsburgh Penguins	4–3	Ottawa Senators	24–11–2	50	W
38	Apr 11	Washington Capitals	1–3	Pittsburgh Penguins	25–11–2	52	W
39	Apr 15	Ottawa Senators	2–5	Pittsburgh Penguins	26–11–2	54	W
40	Apr 16	Pittsburgh Penguins	3–4 OT	Philadelphia Flyers	26–12–2	54	L
41	Apr 18	New York Rangers	5–6	Pittsburgh Penguins	27–12–2	56	W
42	Apr 22	Washington Capitals	2–1	Pittsburgh Penguins	27–13–2	56	L
43	Apr 23	Pittsburgh Penguins	4–2	Hartford Whalers	28–13–2	58	W
44	Apr 26	Pittsburgh Penguins	3–3 OT	New Jersey Devils	28–13–3	59	T
45	Apr 28	Boston Bruins	1–4	Pittsburgh Penguins	29–13–3	61	W
46	Apr 30	Pittsburgh Penguins	2–5	Boston Bruins	29–14–3	61	L

May: 0–2–0 (home: 0–1–0; road: 0–1–0), 0 points

#	Date	Visitor	Score	Home	Record	Points	Recap
47	May 2	Pittsburgh Penguins	2–7	Washington Capitals	29–15–3	61	L
48	May 3	Florida Panthers	4–3	Pittsburgh Penguins	29–16–3	61	L

Legend: W Win (2 points) L Loss (0 points) T Tie (1 point)

=== Playoffs ===
1995 Stanley Cup playoffs
Eastern Conference Quarterfinals vs. (6) Washington Capitals – Penguins win 4–3

Game	Date	Visitor	Score	Home	Series	Recap
1	May 6	Washington Capitals	4–5	Pittsburgh Penguins	0–1	L
2	May 8	Washington Capitals	5–3	Pittsburgh Penguins	1–1	W
3	May 10	Pittsburgh Penguins	2–6	Washington Capitals	1–2	L
4	May 12	Pittsburgh Penguins	2–6	Washington Capitals	1–3	L
5	May 14	Washington Capitals	6–5 OT	Pittsburgh Penguins	2–3	W
6	May 16	Pittsburgh Penguins	7–1	Washington Capitals	3–3	W
7	May 18	Pittsburgh Penguins	3–0	Washington Capitals	4–3	W

Eastern Conference Semifinals vs. (5) New Jersey Devils – Devils win 4–1

Game	Date	Visitor	Score	Home	Series	Recap
1	May 20	New Jersey Devils	3–2	Pittsburgh Penguins	1–0	W
2	May 22	New Jersey Devils	2–4	Pittsburgh Penguins	1–1	L
3	May 24	Pittsburgh Penguins	1–5	New Jersey Devils	1–2	L
4	May 26	Pittsburgh Penguins	1–2 OT	New Jersey Devils	1–3	L
5	May 28	New Jersey Devils	1–4	Pittsburgh Penguins	1–4	L

Legend: W Win L Loss

== Suspensions ==
Player	Length	Date
Luc Robitaille	2 games	February 2, 1995

== Injuries ==
Player	Injury	Date
Mario Lemieux	1–year leave for Hodgkin's Lymphoma treatment	August 29, 1994
Wayne McBean	Wrist surgery (Out indefinitely)	October 1, 1994
Tom Barrasso	Wrist surgery (Out indefinitely)	January 20, 1995
Greg Andrusak	Separated shoulder (DTD)	March 15, 1995
Tom Barrasso	Sore wrist (DTD)	May 3, 1995
Drake Berehowsky	Knee surgery (Out indefinitely)	July 1, 1995

== Player statistics ==
Skaters

Regular season
Player	GP	G	A	Pts	+/−	PIM
Jaromir Jagr	48	32	38	70	23	37
Ron Francis	44	11	48	59	30	18
Tomas Sandstrom	47	21	23	44	1	42
Luc Robitaille	46	23	19	42	10	37
Larry Murphy	48	13	25	38	12	18
John Cullen	46	13	24	37	–4	66
Joe Mullen	45	16	21	37	15	6
Kevin Stevens	27	15	12	27	0	51
Shawn McEachern	44	13	13	26	4	22
Ulf Samuelsson	44	1	15	16	11	113
Martin Straka^{‡}	31	4	12	16	0	16
Chris Joseph	33	5	10	15	3	46
Len Barrie	48	3	11	14	–4	66
Mike Hudson	40	2	9	11	–1	34
Norm MacIver^{†}	13	0	9	9	7	6
Kjell Samuelsson	41	1	6	7	8	54
Greg Hawgood	21	1	4	5	2	25
Markus Näslund	14	2	2	4	0	2
Greg Andrusak	7	0	4	4	–1	6
Grant Jennings^{‡}	25	0	4	4	2	36
Jim McKenzie	39	2	1	3	–7	63
Francois Leroux	40	0	2	2	7	114
Chris Tamer	36	2	0	2	0	82
Troy Murray^{†}	13	0	2	2	–1	23
Peter Taglianetti	13	0	1	1	1	12
Rusty Fitzgerald	4	1	0	1	2	0
Richard Park	1	0	1	1	1	2
Drake Berehowsky^{†}	4	0	0	0	1	13
Jeff Christian	1	0	0	0	0	0
Total		181	316	497	—	1,010

Playoffs
Player	GP	G	A	Pts	+/−	PIM
Ron Francis	12	6	13	19	3	4
Larry Murphy	12	2	13	15	3	0
Jaromir Jagr	12	10	5	15	3	6
Luc Robitaille	12	7	4	11	5	26
Kevin Stevens	12	4	7	11	–5	21
Tomas Sandstrom	12	3	3	6	–5	16
Norm MacIver	12	1	4	5	–4	8
Troy Murray	12	2	1	3	–1	12
Joe Mullen	12	0	3	3	–5	4
Chris Joseph	10	1	1	2	–4	12
John Cullen	9	0	2	2	–4	8
Francois Leroux	12	0	2	2	0	14
Ulf Samuelsson	7	0	2	2	2	8
Shawn McEachern	11	0	2	2	–2	8
Kjell Samuelsson	11	0	1	1	–4	32
Len Barrie	4	1	0	1	–6	8
Drake Berehowsky	1	0	0	0	–1	0
Mike Hudson	11	0	0	0	–3	6
Rusty Fitzgerald	5	0	0	0	–1	4
Jim McKenzie	5	0	0	0	0	4
Peter Taglianetti	4	0	0	0	–3	2
Chris Tamer	4	0	0	0	–4	18
Ian Moran	8	0	0	0	0	0
Richard Park	3	0	0	0	–1	2
Total		37	63	100	—	223

Goaltenders

Regular Season
Player	GP	TOI	W	L	T	GA	GAA	SA	SV%	SO	G	A	PIM
Ken Wregget	38	2208:28	25	9	2	118	3.21	1219	0.903	0	0	0	14
Wendell Young	10	496:38	3	6	0	27	3.26	255	0.894	0	0	0	2
Philippe DeRouville	1	60:00	1	0	0	3	3.00	27	0.889	0	0	0	0
Tom Barrasso	2	125:00	0	1	1	8	3.84	75	0.893	0	0	0	0
Total		2890:06	29	16	3	156	3.24	1576	0.901	0	0	0	16

Playoffs
Player	GP	TOI	W	L	GA	GAA	SA	SV%	SO	G	A	PIM
Ken Wregget	11	660:35	5	6	33	3.00	349	0.905	1	0	0	7
Tom Barrasso	2	80:00	0	1	8	6.00	41	0.805	0	0	0	2
Total		740:35	5	7	41	3.32	390	0.895	1	0	0	9

^{†}Denotes player spent time with another team before joining the Penguins. Stats reflect time with the Penguins only.
^{‡}Denotes player was traded mid-season. Stats reflect time with the Penguins only.

== Awards and records ==
=== Awards ===
Type	Award/honor	Recipient	Ref
League (annual)	Art Ross Trophy	Jaromir Jagr	
League (annual)	Frank J. Selke Trophy	Ron Francis	
League (annual)	Lady Byng Memorial Trophy	Ron Francis	
League (annual)	Lester Patrick Trophy	Joe Mullen	
League (annual)	NHL First All-Star team	Jaromir Jagr (Right Wing)	
League (annual)	NHL Second All-Star team	Larry Murphy (Defense)	
League (annual)	NHL Plus-Minus Award	Ron Francis	
Team	A. T. Caggiano Memorial Booster Club Award	Jaromir Jagr	
Team	Aldege "Baz" Bastien Memorial Good Guy Award	Larry Murphy	
Team	Bob Johnson Memorial Badger Bob Award	Ron Francis	
Team	Bob Johnson Memorial Badger Bob Award	Joe Mullen	
Team	Leading Scorer Award	Jaromir Jagr	
Team	Michel Briere Memorial Rookie of the Year Trophy	No winner	
Team	Most Valuable Player Award	Jaromir Jagr	
Team	Players' Player Award	Ron Francis	
Team	The Edward J. DeBartolo Community Service Award	Ron Francis	
Team	The Edward J. DeBartolo Community Service Award	Bryan Trottier	

=== Milestones ===
Milestone	Player	Date	Ref
1,000th point	Joe Mullen	February 7, 1995	
400th goal	Luc Robitaille	February 19, 1995	
First game	Philippe DeRouville	April 10, 1995	
First game	Rusty Fitzgerald	April 15, 1995	
First game	Richard Park	May 3, 1995	
First game	Ian Moran	May 10, 1995	
1,000th game played	Ron Francis	April 16, 1995	

== Transactions ==
The Penguins were involved in the following transactions during the 1994–95 season:

=== Trades ===
July 29, 1994	To Los Angeles Kings Rick Tocchet; 1995 2nd round pick	To Pittsburgh Penguins Luc Robitaille
February 16, 1995	To Tampa Bay Lightning future considerations	To Pittsburgh Penguins Wendell Young
April 7, 1995	To Toronto Maple Leafs Grant Jennings	To Pittsburgh Penguins Drake Berehowsky
April 7, 1995	To Winnipeg Jets Greg Brown	To Pittsburgh Penguins cash
April 7, 1995	To Ottawa Senators Martin Straka	To Pittsburgh Penguins Norm Maciver; Troy Murray

=== Free agents ===
Player	Acquired from	Lost to	Date
Jeff Christian	New Jersey Devils		August 2, 1994
Mike Ramsey		Buffalo Sabres	August 3, 1994
John Cullen	Toronto Maple Leafs		August 3, 1994
Len Barrie	Florida Panthers		August 15, 1994

=== Signings ===
Player	Date
Joe Dziedzic	August 10, 1994
Brian Farrell	September 20, 1994
Ryan Savoia	April 7, 1995

=== Other ===
Name	Date	Details
Allen Pedersen	September 20, 1994	Released
Doug Brown	January 18, 1995	Lost in waiver draft (to Detroit Red Wings)
Chris Joseph	January 18, 1995	Claimed in waiver draft (from Tampa Bay Lightning)
Francois Leroux	January 18, 1995	Claimed in waiver draft (from Ottawa Senators)
Mike Hudson	January 18, 1995	Claimed in waiver draft (from New York Rangers)
Wayne McBean	January 18, 1995	Claimed in waiver draft (from Winnipeg Jets)
Micah Aivazoff	January 18, 1995	Claimed in waiver draft (from Detroit Red Wings)
Micah Aivazoff	January 18, 1995	Lost in waiver draft (to Edmonton Oilers)

== Draft picks ==
Pittsburgh Penguins' picks at the 1994 NHL entry draft.

Round	#	Player	Pos	Nationality	College/Junior/Club team (League)
1	24	Chris Wells	Center	Canada	Seattle Thunderbirds (WHL)
2	50	Richard Park	Right wing	United States	Belleville Bulls (OHL)
3	57^{[a]}	Sven Butenschon	Defense	Germany	Brandon Wheat Kings (WHL)
3	73^{[b]}	Greg Crozier	Left wing	Canada	Lawrence Academy (USHS–MA)
3	76	Alexei Krivchenkov	Defense	Russia	CSKA Moscow (Russia)
4	102	Tom O'Connor	Defense	United States	Springfield Olympics (EJHL)
5	128	Clint Johnson	Left wing	United States	East High School (Duluth) (USHS–MN)
6	154	Valentin Morozov	Center	Russia	CSKA Moscow (Russia)
7	161^{[c]}	Serge Aubin	Center	Canada	Granby Bisons (QMJHL)
7	180	Drew Palmer	Defense	United States	Seattle Thunderbirds (WHL)
8	206	Boris Zelenko	Left wing	Russia	CSKA Moscow (RUssia)
9	232	Jason Godbout	Defense	United States	Hill-Murray School (USHS–MN)
10	258	Mikhail Kazakevich	Center	Russia	Torpedo Yaroslavl (Russia)
11	284	Brian Leitza	Goaltender	United States	Sioux City Musketeers (USHL)

Draft notes

- ^{a} The Hartford Whalers' third-round pick went to the Pittsburgh Penguins as a result of a March 10, 1992, trade that sent Frank Pietrangelo to the Whalers in exchange for a seventh-round pick and this pick.
- ^{b} The Boston Bruins' third-round pick went to the Pittsburgh Penguins as a result of an October 8, 1993, trade that sent Paul Stanton to the Bruins in exchange for this pick.
- ^{c} The Hartford Whalers' seventh-round pick went to the Pittsburgh Penguins as a result of a March 10, 1992, trade that sent Frank Pietrangelo to the Whalers in exchange for a third-round pick and this pick.

== See also ==
- 1994–95 NHL season
