= 1994–95 Ottawa Senators season =

NHL hockey team season

1994–95 Ottawa Senators
- Division: 7th Northeast
- Conference: 14th Eastern
- 1994–95 record: 9–34–5
- Home record: 5–16–3
- Road record: 4–18–2
- Goals for: 117
- Goals against: 174

Team information
- General manager: Randy Sexton
- Coach: Rick Bowness
- Captain: Randy Cunneyworth
- Alternate captains: Chris Dahlquist; Troy Murray
- Arena: Ottawa Civic Centre
- Average attendance: 9,879
- Minor league affiliates: Prince Edward Island Senators; Thunder Bay Senators

Team leaders
- Goals: Alexei Yashin (21)
- Assists: Alexei Yashin (23)
- Points: Alexei Yashin (44)
- Penalty minutes: Randy Cunneyworth (68)
- Plus/minus: Troy Mallette (+6)
- Wins: Don Beaupre (8)
- Goals against average: Don Beaupre (3.36)

The 1994–95 Ottawa Senators season was the third season of the National Hockey League (NHL) club, was cut short due to the NHL lockout, which postponed the start of the season until late January, and teams only played 48 games that season. This was also the team's final full season at the Ottawa Civic Centre before moving to the Palladium the following season.

== Regular season ==
Northeast Division teams

Alexei Yashin once again proved to be the Senators leader on the ice, scoring 21 goals, along with 23 assists for a team leading 44 points. Alexandre Daigle had another strong season also, putting up 37 points (16 goals, 21 assists) to finish second to Yashin in team scoring.

Don Beaupre led the team in net, setting the team record for best GAA average in a season (3.36), best save percentage (.896), won 8 of the 9 games the Senators won during the season and got the first shutout in team history on February 6, when the Senators shutout the Philadelphia Flyers 3–0 at the Civic Centre.

The Sens started slow, going 0–6–2 in their first eight games before their shutout win over Philadelphia. They slumped throughout the first 41 games of the season, as they had a 4–32–5 record but the team finished the year by going 5–2–0 in their last seven games, outscoring their opponents 27-21, to finish the season with a 9–34–5 record but failed to avoid finishing in last place in the NHL for the third straight season.

The Senators finished last in wins (9), losses (34), points (23), even-strength goals against (129), and tied the Florida Panthers and Montreal Canadiens for fewest short-handed goals scored (1).

=== Season standings ===
Northeast Division
No.	CR		GP	W	L	T	GF	GA	Pts
1	1	**Quebec Nordiques**	48	30	13	5	185	134	65
2	3	**Pittsburgh Penguins**	48	29	16	3	181	158	61
3	4	**Boston Bruins**	48	27	18	3	150	127	57
4	7	**Buffalo Sabres**	48	22	19	7	130	119	51
5	10	Hartford Whalers	48	19	24	5	127	141	43
6	11	Montreal Canadiens	48	18	23	7	125	148	43
7	14	Ottawa Senators	48	9	34	5	117	174	23

Eastern Conference
R		Div	GP	W	L	T	GF	GA	Pts
**1**	**Quebec Nordiques**	**NE**	**48**	**30**	**13**	**5**	**185**	**134**	65
**2**	**Philadelphia Flyers**	**AT**	**48**	**28**	**16**	**4**	**150**	**132**	60
**3**	**Pittsburgh Penguins**	**NE**	**48**	**29**	**16**	**3**	**181**	**158**	61
**4**	**Boston Bruins**	**NE**	**48**	**27**	**18**	**3**	**150**	**127**	57
**5**	**New Jersey Devils**	**AT**	**48**	**22**	**18**	**8**	**136**	**121**	52
**6**	**Washington Capitals**	**AT**	**48**	**22**	**18**	**8**	**136**	**120**	52
**7**	**Buffalo Sabres**	**NE**	**48**	**22**	**19**	**7**	**130**	**119**	51
**8**	**New York Rangers**	**AT**	**48**	**22**	**23**	**3**	**139**	**134**	47
9	Florida Panthers	AT	48	20	22	6	115	127	46
10	Hartford Whalers	NE	48	19	24	5	127	141	43
11	Montreal Canadiens	NE	48	18	23	7	125	148	43
12	Tampa Bay Lightning	AT	48	17	28	3	120	144	37
13	New York Islanders	AT	48	15	28	5	126	158	35
14	Ottawa Senators	NE	48	9	34	5	117	174	23

Divisions: AT – Atlantic, NE – Northeast

bold – Qualified for playoffs

== Schedule and results ==
1994–95 regular season
January: 0–3–2 (home: 0–0–1; road: 0–3–1)

Game	Date	Score	Opponent	Record	Attendance	Recap
1	January 22, 1995	3–3 OT	@ New York Islanders (1994–95)	0–0–1	10,311	T
2	January 25, 1995	1–4	@ Hartford Whalers (1994–95)	0–1–1	8,567	L
3	January 27, 1995	4–5	@ Pittsburgh Penguins (1994–95)	0–2–1	17,181	L
4	January 28, 1995	2–2 OT	Buffalo Sabres (1994–95)	0–2–2	10,575	T
5	January 30, 1995	2–6	@ New York Rangers (1994–95)	0–3–2	18,200	L

February: 2–9–1 (home: 1–6–1; road: 1–3–0)

Game	Date	Score	Opponent	Record	Attendance	Recap
6	February 1, 1995	1–2	Hartford Whalers (1994–95)	0–4–2	9,663	L
7	February 2, 1995	4–6	@ Boston Bruins (1994–95)	0–5–2	13,219	L
8	February 4, 1995	1–2	New York Rangers (1994–95)	0–6–2	10,424	L
9	February 6, 1995	3–0	Philadelphia Flyers (1994–95)	1–6–2	9,267	W
10	February 8, 1995	2–4	Montreal Canadiens (1994–95)	1–7–2	10,575	L
11	February 11, 1995	2–5	@ Quebec Nordiques (1994–95)	1–8–2	14,321	L
12	February 15, 1995	0–2	@ Florida Panthers (1994–95)	1–9–2	12,072	L
13	February 17, 1995	2–1	@ Tampa Bay Lightning (1994–95)	2–9–2	16,131	W
14	February 23, 1995	5–5 OT	Washington Capitals (1994–95)	2–9–3	9,357	T
15	February 25, 1995	1–4	Florida Panthers (1994–95)	2–10–3	9,520	L
16	February 27, 1995	0–2	Boston Bruins (1994–95)	2–11–3	10,242	L
17	February 28, 1995	3–6	Hartford Whalers (1994–95)	2–12–3	9,174	L

March: 2–11–1 (home: 2–5–0; road: 0–6–1)

Game	Date	Score	Opponent	Record	Attendance	Recap
18	March 2, 1995	2–3 OT	Tampa Bay Lightning (1994–95)	2–13–3	9,114	L
19	March 5, 1995	3–1	New York Islanders (1994–95)	3–13–3	9,314	W
20	March 6, 1995	3–4	@ New York Rangers (1994–95)	3–14–3	18,200	L
21	March 8, 1995	2–3	@ Florida Panthers (1994–95)	3–15–3	13,609	L
22	March 10, 1995	2–2 OT	@ Washington Capitals (1994–95)	3–15–4	11,927	T
23	March 14, 1995	2–4	@ New Jersey Devils (1994–95)	3–16–4	13,234	L
24	March 16, 1995	1–3	Philadelphia Flyers (1994–95)	3–17–4	10,382	L
25	March 18, 1995	4–3 OT	Buffalo Sabres (1994–95)	4–17–4	9,915	W
26	March 19, 1995	3–4	Pittsburgh Penguins (1994–95)	4–18–4	9,804	L
27	March 21, 1995	0–1	@ Washington Capitals (1994–95)	4–19–4	10,322	L
28	March 25, 1995	1–3	@ Montreal Canadiens (1994–95)	4–20–4	16,897	L
29	March 26, 1995	4–11	Quebec Nordiques (1994–95)	4–21–4	10,276	L
30	March 29, 1995	2–4	New Jersey Devils (1994–95)	4–22–4	9,582	L
31	March 30, 1995	0–7	@ Buffalo Sabres (1994–95)	4–23–4	12,386	L

April: 4–10–1 (home: 2–5–1; road: 2–5–0)

Game	Date	Score	Opponent	Record	Attendance	Recap
32	April 2, 1995	5–7	@ Quebec Nordiques (1994–95)	4–24–4	14,335	L
33	April 3, 1995	4–5	Montreal Canadiens (1994–95)	4–25–4	10,575	L
34	April 5, 1995	0–2	New Jersey Devils (1994–95)	4–26–4	9,251	L
35	April 8, 1995	2–2 OT	Quebec Nordiques (1994–95)	4–26–5	10,575	T
36	April 10, 1995	3–4	Pittsburgh Penguins (1994–95)	4–27–5	10,074	L
37	April 12, 1995	2–4	@ Hartford Whalers (1994–95)	4–28–5	10,509	L
38	April 15, 1995	2–5	@ Pittsburgh Penguins (1994–95)	4–29–5	16,740	L
39	April 16, 1995	1–2	@ Buffalo Sabres (1994–95)	4–30–5	14,273	L
40	April 19, 1995	1–4	@ Montreal Canadiens (1994–95)	4–31–5	16,321	L
41	April 20, 1995	5–6	Boston Bruins (1994–95)	4–32–5	10,575	L
42	April 22, 1995	3–2	@ New York Islanders (1994–95)	5–32–5	10,281	W
43	April 24, 1995	1–5	Florida Panthers (1994–95)	5–33–5	9,164	L
44	April 26, 1995	5–2	@ Philadelphia Flyers (1994–95)	6–33–5	17,380	W
45	April 27, 1995	6–1	Tampa Bay Lightning (1994–95)	7–33–5	9,291	W
46	April 29, 1995	4–3	New York Islanders (1994–95)	8–33–5	10,417	W

May: 1–1–0 (home: 0–0–0; road: 1–1–0)

Game	Date	Score	Opponent	Record	Attendance	Recap
47	May 1, 1995	4–5	@ Boston Bruins (1994–95)	8–34–5	14,448	L
48	May 3, 1995	4–3	@ Tampa Bay Lightning (1994–95)	9–34–5	21,689	W

Legend: W Win (2 points) L Loss (0 points) T Tie (1 point)

== Player statistics ==
=== Scoring ===
- Position abbreviations: C = Centre; D = Defence; G = Goaltender; LW = Left wing; RW = Right wing
- † = Joined team via a transaction (e.g., trade, waivers, signing) during the season. Stats reflect time with the Senators only.
- ‡ = Left team via a transaction (e.g., trade, waivers, release) during the season. Stats reflect time with the Senators only.

No.	Player	Pos	Regular season					
No.	Player	Pos	GP	G	A	Pts	+/-	PIM
19	Alexei Yashin	C	47	21	23	44	−20	20
91	Alexandre Daigle	C	47	16	21	37	−22	14
61	Sylvain Turgeon	LW	33	11	8	19	−1	29
74	Steve Larouche	C	18	8	7	15	−5	6
3	Sean Hill	D	45	1	14	15	−11	30
10	Rob Gaudreau	RW	36	5	9	14	−16	8
33	Troy Murray‡	C	33	4	10	14	−1	16
49	Michel Picard	LW	24	5	8	13	−1	14
26	Scott Levins	RW	24	5	6	11	4	51
17	Dave McLlwain	C	43	5	6	11	−26	22
22	Norm Maciver‡	D	28	4	7	11	−9	10
76	Radek Bonk	C	42	3	8	11	−5	28
7	Randy Cunneyworth	LW	48	5	5	10	−19	68
25	Pat Elynuik	RW	41	3	7	10	−11	51
18	Troy Mallette	LW	23	3	5	8	6	35
6	Chris Dahlquist	D	46	1	7	8	−30	36
29	Phil Bourque	LW	38	4	3	7	−17	20
78	Pavol Demitra	LW	16	4	3	7	−4	0
5	Kerry Huffman	D	37	2	4	6	−17	46
15	Dave Archibald	C	14	2	2	4	−7	19
94	Stan Neckar	D	48	1	3	4	−20	37
21	Dennis Vial	D	27	0	4	4	0	65
11	Evgeny Davydov	LW	3	1	2	3	2	0
20	Bill Huard‡	LW	26	1	1	2	−2	64
24	Daniel Laperriere†	D	13	1	1	2	−4	0
82	Martin Straka†	C	6	1	1	2	−1	0
2	Jim Paek	D	29	0	2	2	−5	28
23	Claude Boivin	LW	3	0	1	1	−1	6
56	Lance Pitlick	D	15	0	1	1	−5	6
35	Mike Bales	G	1	0	0	0		0
33 (Note: Beaupre wore number 31 through April 16.)	Don Beaupre	G	38	0	0	0		10
44	Radim Bicanek	D	6	0	0	0	3	0
1	Craig Billington‡	G	9	0	0	0		2
46	Daniel Guerard	RW	2	0	0	0	0	0
30	Darrin Madeley	G	5	0	0	0		0
4	Brad Shaw	D	2	0	0	0	3	0

=== Goaltending ===
- ‡ = Left team via a transaction (e.g., trade, waivers, release) during the season. Stats reflect time with the Senators only.

No.	Player	Regular season									
No.	Player	GP	W	L	T	SA	GA	GAA	SV%	SO	TOI
33	Don Beaupre	38	8	25	3	1167	121	3.36	.896	1	2161
30	Darrin Madeley	5	1	3	0	147	15	3.53	.898	0	255
35	Mike Bales	1	0	0	0	1	0	0.00	1.000	0	3
1	Craig Billington‡	9	0	6	2	240	32	4.06	.867	0	472

== Awards and records ==
=== Awards ===
Type	Award/honour	Recipient	Ref
Team	Molson Cup	Don Beaupre	

=== Milestones ===
Milestone	Player	Date	Ref
First game	Radek Bonk	January 22, 1995	
First game	Stanislav Neckar	January 22, 1995	
First game	Radim Bicanek	January 27, 1995	
First game	Lance Pitlick	February 27, 1995	
First game	Steve Larouche	February 28, 1995	
First game	Daniel Guerard	April 27, 1995	

== Transactions ==
=== May 1994 ===
May 12	Signed free agent Jean-François Labbé from the PEI Senators of the AHL to a 1-year contract.

=== June 1994 ===
June 14	Signed free agent Bruce Gardiner from the Peoria Rivermen of the IHL to an entry-level contract. Signed free agent Michel Picard from the Portland Pirates of the AHL to a 2-year, $450,000 (CAD) contract.
June 20	Signed free agent Corey Foster from the Hershey Bears of the AHL to a 1-year contract.
June 21	Signed free agent Pat Elynuik from the Tampa Bay Lightning to a 2-year, $1.23 mil (CAD) contract.
June 22	Signed free agent Lance Pitlick from the Hershey Bears of the AHL to a 1-year, $250,000 (CAD) contract.
June 25	Acquired Jim Paek from the Los Angeles Kings for a 7th round pick in the 1995 NHL entry draft - (Benoit Larose).
June 28	Acquired Sean Hill and a 9th round pick in the 1994 NHL entry draft - (Frederic Cassivi from the Mighty Ducks of Anaheim for a 3rd round pick in the 1994 NHL entry draft - Vadim Epanchintsev. Mark Michaud, Andrew McBain, Brad Lauer, Dan Quinn, Gord Dineen, Graeme Townshend and Mark LaForest became unrestricted free agents.

=== July 1994 ===
July 4	Signed free agent Chris Dahlquist from the Calgary Flames to a 2-year, $790,000 contract. Signed free agent Mike Bales from the Providence Bruins to a 1-year contract.
July 15	Signed free agent Randy Cunneyworth from the Chicago Blackhawks to a 3-year, $1.3 mil (CAD) contract.

=== September 1994 ===
September 11	Signed free agent Steve Larouche from the Atlanta Knights of the IHL to a 1-year, $225,000 (CAD) contract.

=== October 1994 ===
October 15	Acquired Jason Zent from the New York Islanders for a 5th round pick in the 1996 NHL entry draft - (Andy Berenzweig).

=== January 1995 ===
January 18	Acquired Don Beaupre from the Washington Capitals for a 5th round pick in the 1995 NHL entry draft - (Benoit Gratton). Claimed Rob Gaudreau from the San Jose Sharks in the 1994 NHL Waiver Draft. Lost François Leroux to the Pittsburgh Penguins in the 1994 NHL Waiver Draft.

=== March 1995 ===
March 30	Lost free agent Jim Kyte to the San Jose Sharks on a 1-year contract.

=== April 1995 ===
April 7	Acquired Martin Straka from the Pittsburgh Penguins for Troy Murray and Norm Maciver. Acquired the rights of Mika Stromberg and a 4th round draft pick in the 1995 NHL entry draft - (Kevin Boyd) from the Quebec Nordiques for Bill Huard. Acquired Daniel Laperrière and a 9th round pick in the 1995 NHL entry draft - (Erik Kaminski) from the St. Louis Blues for a 9th round pick in the 1995 NHL entry draft - (Libor Zabransky). Acquired an 8th round draft pick in the 1995 NHL entry draft - (Ray Schultz) from the Boston Bruins for Craig Billington. Lost free agent Steve Konroyd to the Calgary Flames on a 1-year contract.

== Draft picks ==
Ottawa's draft picks at the 1994 NHL entry draft in Hartford, Connecticut.

Round	#	Player	Nationality	College/junior/club team (league)
1	3	Radek Bonk	Czech Republic	Las Vegas Thunder (IHL)
2	29	Stanislav Neckar	Czech Republic	HC České Budějovice (Czech.)
4	81	Bryan Masotta	United States	Hotchkiss Academy (US HS)
6	131	Mike Gaffney	United States	LaSalle Academy (US HS)
6	133	Daniel Alfredsson	Sweden	Frölunda HC (Elitserien)
7	159	Doug Sproule	United States	Hotchkiss Academy (US HS)
9	210	Frederic Cassivi	Canada	Saint-Hyacinthe Laser (QMJHL)
9	211	Danny Dupont	Canada	Laval Titan (QMJHL)
10	237	Steve MacKinnon	United States	Chelmsford High School (US HS)
11	274	Antti Tormanen	Finland	Jokerit (SM-liiga)
S	3	Steve Guolla	Canada	Michigan State University (CCHA)

== Farm teams ==
=== Prince Edward Island Senators ===
The Prince Edward Island Senators named Dave Allison as their head coach for the 1994–95 season. Under Allison, the club qualified for the post-season for the first time in team history, as PEI finished in first place in the Atlantic Division with a 41–31–8 record, earning 90 points.

Steve Larouche led the league with 50 goals and he finished second in the AHL with 101 points. Larouche won the Les Cunningham Award as the Most Valuable Player in the league, as well as winning the Fred T. Hunt Memorial Award for Sportsmanship/Perseverance. Mike Bales led the Senators with 21 wins and Jean-François Labbé had a team best 3.32 GAA.

In the post-season, PEI defeated the Saint John Flames before losing to the Fredericton Canadiens in the division finals. Jason Zent led the team with six playoff goals and Andy Schneider had a playoff team high 10 points. Bales led the club with six playoff wins and had a team-low 2.72 GAA.

=== Thunder Bay Senators ===
Bill McDonald remained as head coach for the Thunder Bay Senators in the 1994–95 season. Thunder Bay finished the regular season with a 48–22–8 record, earning 104 points, which led the league in points.

Jean Blouin led the club with 70 goals, which placed him in second in the league, and he also led the team with 109 points. Lance Leslie earned a team-high 29 wins and led the club with a 3.22 GAA.

In the playoffs, the Senators won their second consecutive championship, defeating the Saginaw Wheels and Muskegon Fury. Blouin scored a league-high 16 goals in the post-season and Jason Firth had a league-best 28 points.

== See also ==
- 1994–95 NHL season
