= 1994–95 New Jersey Devils season =

Season of play of professional ice hockey team

1994–95 New Jersey Devils
- Stanley Cup champions
- Eastern Conference champions
- Division: 2nd Atlantic
- Conference: 5th Eastern
- 1994–95 record: 22–18–8
- Home record: 14–4–6
- Road record: 8–14–2
- Goals for: 136
- Goals against: 121

Team information
- General manager: Lou Lamoriello
- Coach: Jacques Lemaire
- Captain: Scott Stevens
- Alternate captains: Bruce Driver; John MacLean
- Arena: Brendan Byrne Arena
- Average attendance: 16,379
- Minor league affiliates: Albany River Rats (AHL); Raleigh IceCaps (ECHL); Flint Generals (UHL)

Team leaders
- Goals: Stephane Richer (23)
- Assists: Neal Broten; Scott Stevens (20)
- Points: Stephane Richer (39)
- Penalty minutes: Mike Peluso (167)
- Plus/minus: Scott Niedermayer (+19)
- Wins: Martin Brodeur (19)
- Goals against average: Martin Brodeur (2.45)

The 1994–95 New Jersey Devils season was the 21st season for the National Hockey League (NHL) franchise that was established on June 11, 1974, and 13th season since the franchise relocated from Colorado prior to the 1982–83 NHL season. Although they played an abbreviated 48-game season, shortened by the 1994–95 NHL lockout, the Devils won their first Stanley Cup championship in franchise history.

The Devils entered the 1995 Stanley Cup playoffs as the second seed in the Atlantic Division and the fifth seed in the Eastern Conference. The Devils eventually swept the heavily favored Detroit Red Wings in the Stanley Cup Final.

== Preseason ==
After a 5–2–2 preseason record, the Devils, along with the rest of NHL players, were locked-out from October 1, 1994, to January 11, 1995.

== Regular season ==
During the regular season, the Devils scored the fewest power-play goals (22) and had the fewest power-play opportunities in the NHL, with just 164. They were also the least penalized team, being shorthanded only 149 times.

=== Standings ===
Atlantic Division
No.	CR		GP	W	L	T	GF	GA	Pts
1	2	**Philadelphia Flyers**	48	28	16	4	150	132	60
2	5	**New Jersey Devils**	48	22	18	8	136	121	52
3	6	**Washington Capitals**	48	22	18	8	136	120	52
4	8	**New York Rangers**	48	22	23	3	139	134	47
5	9	Florida Panthers	48	20	22	6	115	127	46
6	12	Tampa Bay Lightning	48	17	28	3	120	144	37
7	13	New York Islanders	48	15	28	5	126	158	35

Note: No. = Division rank, CR = Conference rank, W = Wins, L = Losses, T = Ties, GF = Goals For, GA = Goals Against, Pts = Points
Teams that qualified for the playoffs are highlighted in bold.

Eastern Conference
R		Div	GP	W	L	T	GF	GA	Pts
**1**	**Quebec Nordiques**	**NE**	**48**	**30**	**13**	**5**	**185**	**134**	65
**2**	**Philadelphia Flyers**	**AT**	**48**	**28**	**16**	**4**	**150**	**132**	60
**3**	**Pittsburgh Penguins**	**NE**	**48**	**29**	**16**	**3**	**181**	**158**	61
**4**	**Boston Bruins**	**NE**	**48**	**27**	**18**	**3**	**150**	**127**	57
**5**	**New Jersey Devils**	**AT**	**48**	**22**	**18**	**8**	**136**	**121**	52
**6**	**Washington Capitals**	**AT**	**48**	**22**	**18**	**8**	**136**	**120**	52
**7**	**Buffalo Sabres**	**NE**	**48**	**22**	**19**	**7**	**130**	**119**	51
**8**	**New York Rangers**	**AT**	**48**	**22**	**23**	**3**	**139**	**134**	47
9	Florida Panthers	AT	48	20	22	6	115	127	46
10	Hartford Whalers	NE	48	19	24	5	127	141	43
11	Montreal Canadiens	NE	48	18	23	7	125	148	43
12	Tampa Bay Lightning	AT	48	17	28	3	120	144	37
13	New York Islanders	AT	48	15	28	5	126	158	35
14	Ottawa Senators	NE	48	9	34	5	117	174	23

Divisions: AT – Atlantic, NE – Northeast

bold – Qualified for playoffs

== Schedule and results ==
=== Preseason ===
1994 preseason
Preseason: 5–2–2 (home: 2–0–1; road: 3–2–1)

Game	Date	Visitor	Score	Home	OT	Decision	Attendance	Record	Result
1	September 11	New Jersey	5–4	Philadelphia				1–0–0	W
2	September 12	New Jersey	1–3	Pittsburgh				1–1–0	L
3^{[a]}	September 15	New Jersey	3–2	Boston				2–1–0	W
4	September 16	New Jersey	3–4	N.Y. Rangers				2–2–0	L
5	September 20	New Jersey	4–1	N.Y. Islanders				3–2–0	W
6	September 21	Philadelphia	1–4	New Jersey				4–2–0	W
7	September 23	N.Y. Islanders	1–4	New Jersey				5–2–0	W
8	September 25	New Jersey	3–3	Hartford	OT			5–1–0	T
9	September 27	N.Y. Rangers	2–2	New Jersey	OT			5–2–2	T
Notes:^{a} Game was played at Knickerbocker Arena in Albany, New York.

Legend: W Win (2 points) L Loss (0 points) T Tie (1 point)

=== Regular season ===
1994–95 regular season
January: 1–3–1 (home: 1–1–2; road: 0–3–1)

Game	Date	Visitor	Score	Home	OT	Decision	Attendance	Record	Pts	Recap
1	January 22	New Jersey	2–2	Hartford	OT	Brodeur	12,054	0–0–1	1	T
2	January 25	New Jersey	1–2	Buffalo		Brodeur	16,232	0–1–1	1	L
3	January 26	New Jersey	0–1	Boston	OT	Terreri	13,842	0–2–1	1	L
4	January 28	New Jersey	1–5	Montreal		Brodeur	16,354	0–3–1	1	L
5	January 31	Buffalo	1–2	New Jersey		Brodeur	16,311	1–3–1	3	W

February: 6–4–3 (home: 4–2–3; road: 2–2–0)

Game	Date	Visitor	Score	Home	OT	Decision	Attendance	Record	Pts	Recap
6	February 2	Quebec	4–5	New Jersey		Brodeur	12,096	2–3–1	5	W
7	February 4	New Jersey	0–2	Quebec		Terreri	13,220	2–4–1	5	L
8	February 5	Pittsburgh	3–3	New Jersey	OT	Brodeur	15,280	2–4–2	6	T
9	February 9	N.Y. Rangers	1–4	New Jersey		Brodeur	19,040	3–4–2	8	W
10	February 11	Philadelphia	3–1	New Jersey		Terreri	19,040	3–5–2	8	L
11	February 12	New Jersey	4–2	Florida		Brodeur	14,375	4–5–2	10	W
12	February 15	Washington	2–4	New Jersey		Brodeur	11,970	5–5–2	12	W
13	February 17	N.Y. Islanders	2–2	New Jersey	OT	Brodeur	18,501	5–5–3	13	T
14	February 18	New Jersey	2–3	N.Y. Islanders		Terreri	15,671	5–6–3	13	L
15	February 20	New Jersey	2–0	Washington		Brodeur	10,761	6–6–3	15	W
16	February 23	Boston	3–2	New Jersey		Brodeur	15,411	6–7–3	15	L
17	February 25	Washington	3–3	New Jersey	OT	Brodeur	16,832	6–7–4	16	T
18	February 27	Montreal	1–6	New Jersey		Terreri	14,005	7–7–4	18	W

March: 7–6–2 (home: 3–1–1; road: 4–5–1)

Game	Date	Visitor	Score	Home	OT	Decision	Attendance	Record	Pts	Recap
19	March 2	New Jersey	2–7	Boston		Terreri	14,448	7–8–4	18	L
20	March 4	Florida	1–6	New Jersey		Brodeur	18,005	8–8–4	20	W
21	March 6	New Jersey	3–6	Quebec		Brodeur	13,178	8–9–4	20	L
22	March 8	New Jersey	4–6	N.Y. Rangers		Brodeur	18,200	8–10–4	20	L
23	March 10	New Jersey	3–2	Tampa Bay		Brodeur	23,649	9–10–4	22	W
24	March 12	New Jersey	3–4	Philadelphia		Brodeur	17,380	9–11–4	22	L
25	March 14	Ottawa	2–4	New Jersey		Brodeur	13,234	10–11–4	24	W
26	March 16	Hartford	2–2	New Jersey	OT	Brodeur	16,032	10–11–5	25	T
27	March 18	Tampa Bay	2–1	New Jersey		Brodeur	17,690	10–12–5	25	L
28	March 19	Boston	3–4	New Jersey	OT	Terreri	16,172	11–12–5	27	W
29	March 22	New Jersey	5–2	N.Y. Rangers		Brodeur	18,200	12–12–5	29	W
30	March 24	New Jersey	2–5	Pittsburgh		Brodeur	17,181	12–13–5	29	L
31	March 26	New Jersey	5–5	N.Y. Islanders	OT	Terreri	15,418	12–13–6	30	T
32	March 29	New Jersey	4–2	Ottawa		Brodeur	9,582	13–13–6	32	W
33	March 30	New Jersey	4–3	Philadelphia		Brodeur	17,380	14–13–6	34	W

April: 8–4–2 (home: 5–1–2; road: 3–2–0)

Game	Date	Visitor	Score	Home	OT	Decision	Attendance	Record	Pts	Recap
34	April 1	Montreal	1–4	New Jersey		Brodeur	19,040	15–13–6	36	W
35	April 4	Tampa Bay	1–1	New Jersey	OT	Terreri	13,735	15–13–7	37	T
36	April 5	New Jersey	2–0	Ottawa		Brodeur	9,251	16–13–7	39	W
37	April 9	N.Y. Rangers	0–2	New Jersey		Brodeur	19,040	17–13–7	41	W
38	April 10	New Jersey	1–2	Montreal		Brodeur	16,479	17–14–7	41	L
39	April 12	New Jersey	2–1	Washington		Brodeur	13,248	18–14–7	43	W
40	April 14	N.Y. Islanders	3–6	New Jersey		Brodeur	19,040	19–14–7	45	W
41	April 16	Hartford	2–3	New Jersey		Brodeur	13,613	20–14–7	47	W
42	April 18	New Jersey	2–3	Tampa Bay		Terreri	18,202	20–15–7	47	L
43	April 20	New Jersey	0–1	Florida		Brodeur	14,389	20–16–7	47	L
44	April 22	Philadelphia	4–3	New Jersey	OT	Brodeur	19,040	20–17–7	47	L
45	April 26	Pittsburgh	3–3	New Jersey	OT	Brodeur	17,174	20–17–8	48	T
46	April 28	Florida	1–3	New Jersey		Brodeur	16,676	21–17–8	50	W
47	April 30	Quebec	2–4	New Jersey		Brodeur	16,129	22–17–8	52	W

May: 0–1–0 (home: 0–0–0; road: 0–1–0)

Game	Date	Visitor	Score	Home	OT	Decision	Attendance	Record	Pts	Recap
48	May 3	New Jersey	4–5	Buffalo		Terreri	15,304	22–18–8	52	L

Legend: W Win (2 points) L Loss (0 points) T Tie (1 point)

=== Playoffs ===
1995 Stanley Cup playoffs
Eastern Conference quarterfinals vs. (4) Boston Bruins – Devils win 4–1

Game	Date	Visitor	Score	Home	OT	Decision	Attendance	Series	Recap
1	May 7	New Jersey	5–0	Boston		Brodeur	14,448	Devils lead 1–0	W
2	May 8	New Jersey	3–0	Boston		Brodeur	14,448	Devils lead 2–0	W
3	May 10	Boston	3–2	New Jersey		Brodeur	16,523	Devils lead 2–1	L
4	May 12	Boston	0–1	New Jersey	OT	Brodeur	19,040	Devils lead 3–1	W
5	May 14	New Jersey	3–2	Boston		Brodeur	14,448	Devils win 4–1	W

Eastern Conference semifinals vs. (3) Pittsburgh Penguins – Devils win 4–1

Game	Date	Visitor	Score	Home	OT	Decision	Attendance	Series	Recap
1	May 20	New Jersey	2–3	Pittsburgh		Brodeur	16,643	Penguins lead 1–0	L
2	May 22	New Jersey	4–2	Pittsburgh		Brodeur	16,817	Series tied 1–1	W
3	May 24	Pittsburgh	1–5	New Jersey		Brodeur	18,139	Devils lead 2–1	W
4	May 26	Pittsburgh	1–2	New Jersey	OT	Brodeur	19,040	Devils lead 3–1	W
5	May 28	New Jersey	4–1	Pittsburgh		Brodeur	17,187	Devils win 4–1	W

Eastern Conference finals vs. (2) Philadelphia Flyers – Devils win 4–2

Game	Date	Visitor	Score	Home	OT	Decision	Attendance	Series	Recap
1	June 3	New Jersey	4–1	Philadelphia		Brodeur	17,380	Devils lead 1–0	W
2	June 5	New Jersey	5–2	Philadelphia		Brodeur	17,380	Devils lead 2–0	W
3	June 7	Philadelphia	3–2	New Jersey	OT	Brodeur	19,040	Devils lead 2–1	L
4	June 10	Philadelphia	4–2	New Jersey		Brodeur	19,040	Series tied 2–2	L
5	June 11	New Jersey	3–2	Philadelphia		Brodeur	17,380	Devils lead 3–2	W
6	June 13	Philadelphia	2–4	New Jersey		Brodeur	19,040	Devils win 4–2	W

Stanley Cup Final vs. (W1) Detroit Red Wings – Devils win 4–0

Game	Date	Visitor	Score	Home	OT	Decision	Attendance	Series	Recap
1	June 17	New Jersey	2–1	Detroit		Brodeur	19,875	Devils lead 1–0	W
2	June 20	New Jersey	4–2	Detroit		Brodeur	19,875	Devils lead 2–0	W
3	June 22	Detroit	2–5	New Jersey		Brodeur	19,040	Devils lead 3–0	W
4	June 24	Detroit	2–5	New Jersey		Brodeur	19,040	Devils win 4–0	W

Legend: W Win L Loss

== Player statistics ==
=== Scoring ===
- Position abbreviations: C = Center; D = Defense; G = Goaltender; LW = Left wing; RW = Right wing
- † = Joined team via a transaction (e.g., trade, waivers, signing) during the season. Stats reflect time with the Devils only.
- ‡ = Left team via a transaction (e.g., trade, waivers, release) during the season. Stats reflect time with the Devils only.

No.	Player	Pos	Regular season						Playoffs					
No.	Player	Pos	GP	G	A	Pts	+/-	PIM	GP	G	A	Pts	+/-	PIM
44	Stephane Richer	RW	45	23	16	39	8	10	19	6	15	21	9	2
15	John MacLean	RW	46	17	12	29	13	32	20	5	13	18	8	14
9	Neal Broten†	C	30	8	20	28	9	20	20	7	12	19	13	6
12	Bill Guerin	RW	48	12	13	25	6	72	20	3	8	11	6	30
4	Scott Stevens	D	48	2	20	22	4	56	20	1	7	8	10	24
16	Bobby Holik	C	48	10	10	20	9	18	20	4	4	8	7	22
22	Claude Lemieux	LW	45	6	13	19	2	86	20	13	3	16	12	20
27	Scott Niedermayer	D	48	4	15	19	19	18	20	4	7	11	11	10
17	Tom Chorske	LW	42	10	8	18	−4	16	17	1	5	6	−2	4
14	Brian Rolston	C	40	7	11	18	5	17	6	2	1	3	6	4
19	Bob Carpenter	C	41	5	11	16	−1	19	17	1	4	5	−1	6
23	Bruce Driver	D	41	4	12	16	−1	18	17	1	6	7	13	8
6	Tommy Albelin	D	48	5	10	15	9	20	20	1	7	8	5	2
18	Sergei Brylin	C	26	6	8	14	12	8	12	1	2	3	1	4
21	Randy McKay	RW	33	5	7	12	10	44	19	8	4	12	5	11
8	Mike Peluso	LW	46	2	9	11	5	167	20	1	2	3	4	8
20	Alexander Semak‡	C	19	2	6	8	−4	13	—	—	—	—	—	—
29	Shawn Chambers†	D	21	2	5	7	2	6	20	4	5	9	2	2
10	Corey Millen‡	C	17	2	3	5	2	8	—	—	—	—	—	—
11	Jim Dowd	C	10	1	4	5	−5	0	11	2	1	3	3	8
20	Danton Cole†	LW	12	1	2	3	0	8	1	0	0	0	−1	0
3	Ken Daneyko	D	25	1	2	3	4	54	20	1	0	1	9	22
25	Valeri Zelepukin	LW	4	1	2	3	3	6	18	1	2	3	1	12
7	Chris McAlpine	D	24	0	3	3	4	17	—	—	—	—	—	—
30	Martin Brodeur	G	40	0	2	2		2	20	0	1	1		6
28	Kevin Dean	D	17	0	1	1	6	4	3	0	2	2	0	0
24	David Emma	RW	6	0	1	1	−2	0	—	—	—	—	—	—
2	Viacheslav Fetisov‡	D	4	0	1	1	−2	0	—	—	—	—	—	—
29	Ben Hankinson‡	RW	8	0	0	0	−6	7	—	—	—	—	—	—
5	Jaroslav Modry	D	11	0	0	0	−1	0	—	—	—	—	—	—
33	Reid Simpson	LW	9	0	0	0	−1	27	—	—	—	—	—	—
26	Jason Smith	D	2	0	0	0	−3	0	—	—	—	—	—	—
31	Chris Terreri	G	15	0	0	0		0	1	0	0	0		0

=== Goaltending ===
No.	Player	Regular season											Playoffs									
No.	Player	GP	GS	W	L	T	SA	GA	GAA	SV%	SO	TOI	GP	GS	W	L	SA	GA	GAA	SV%	SO	TOI
30	Martin Brodeur	40	39	19	11	6	908	89	2.44	.902	3	2,184:25	20	20	16	4	463	34	1.67	.927	3	1,221:58
31	Chris Terreri	15	9	3	7	2	309	31	2.53	.900	0	734:00	1	0	0	0	2	0	0.00	1.000	0	7:45

== Awards and records ==
=== Awards ===
Type	Award/honor	Recipient	Ref
League (annual)	Conn Smythe Trophy	Claude Lemieux	
League (in-season)	NHL Player of the Week	Martin Brodeur (April 3–9)	
Team	Devils' Players' Player	Chris Terreri	
Team	Hugh Delano Unsung Hero	Tommy Albelin	
Team	Most Valuable Devil	Stephane Richer	
Team	Three-Star Award	Stephane Richer	

=== Milestones ===
Milestone	Player	Date	Ref
First game	Chris McAlpine	February 2, 1995	
First game	Brian Rolston	February 5, 1995	
First game	Sergei Brylin	February 17, 1995	
First game	Kevin Dean	February 27, 1995	
600th assist	Neal Broten	April 4, 1995	
1,000th game played	Neal Broten	April 28, 1995	

== Transactions ==
The Devils have been involved in the following transactions during the 1994–95 season.

=== Trades ===
Date	Details	
June 29, 1994	To Calgary Flames 1994 3rd-round pick (#77 overall); 1994 VAN pick (#91 overall); 1994 OTT 5th-round pick (#107 overall)	To New Jersey Devils 1994 3rd-round pick (#71 overall)
January 30, 1995	To Chicago Blackhawks Dean Malkoc	To New Jersey Devils Rob Conn
February 27, 1995	To Dallas Stars Corey Millen	To New Jersey Devils Neal Broten
March 14, 1995	To Tampa Bay Lightning Ben Hankinson; Alexander Semak	To New Jersey Devils Shawn Chambers; Danton Cole
April 3, 1995	To Detroit Red Wings Viacheslav Fetisov	To New Jersey Devils 1995 3rd-round pick (#78 overall)

=== Free agents ===
Date	Player	Team
July 10, 1994	Bryan Helmer	
August 26, 1994	Jason Miller	to Detroit Red Wings
January 26, 1995	Kent Nilsson	to Edmonton Oilers

== Draft picks ==
Below are the New Jersey Devils' selections at the 1994 NHL entry draft, which was held on June 28 and 29, 1994.

Round	#	Player	Nationality	Pos	College/Junior/Club team (League)	Notes
1	25	Vadim Sharifijanov	Russia	LW	Salavat Yulaev Ufa (RSL)	
2	51	Patrik Elias	Czech Republic	LW	HC Kladno (Czech Extraliga)	
3	71	Sheldon Souray	Canada	D	Tri-City Americans (WHL)	(Note: The Devils acquired the 1994 third-round pick from Calgary for the Devils' original third-round pick (used on Chris Clark), Vancouver's 1994 fourth-round pick (used on Ryan Duthie) and Ottawa's 1994 fifth-round pick (used on Nils Ekman) on June 29, 1994.)(from Calgary)
4	103	Zdenek Skorepa	Czech Republic	LW	HC Chemopetrol Litvínov (Czech Extraliga)	
5	129	Christian Gosselin	Canada	D	Saint-Hyacinthe Laser (QMJHL)	
6	134	Ryan Smart	United States	F	Meadville High School (Pennsylvania)	(Note: The Devils acquired the 1994 sixth-round pick from Winnipeg for Brent Severyn on September 30, 1993.)(from Winnipeg)
6	155	Luciano Caravaggio	Canada	G	Michigan Technological University (WCHA)	
7	181	Jeff Williams	Canada	LW	Guelph Storm (OHL)	
8	207	Eric Bertrand	Canada	LW	Granby Bisons (QMJHL)	
9	233	Steve Sullivan	Canada	C	Sault Ste. Marie Greyhounds (OHL)	
10	259	Scott Swanjord	United States	G	Waterloo Black Hawks (USHL)	
11	269	Mike Hanson	United States	C	Minot High School (North Dakota)	(Note: The Devils acquired the 1994 eleventh-round pick from Quebec for Stephane Yelle and the Devils' original eleventh-round pick (used on Steven Low) on June 3, 1994.)(from Quebec)

== Media ==
Television coverage of the season was carried on SportsChannel New York and SportsChannel New York Plus, with Mike Emrick and Spencer Ross handling play-by-play duties and Peter McNab providing color commentary. On the radio, the games were broadcast on WABC–AM 770, with Mike Miller describing the play and Sherry Ross providing color commentary.
