= 1994–95 Montreal Canadiens season =

NHL hockey team season

1994–95 Montreal Canadiens
- Division: 6th Northeast
- Conference: 11th Eastern
- 1994–95 record: 18–23–7
- Home record: 15–5–4
- Road record: 3–18–3
- Goals for: 125
- Goals against: 148

Team information
- General manager: Serge Savard
- Coach: Jacques Demers
- Captain: Kirk Muller (Oct.–Apr.); Mike Keane (Apr.–May)
- Alternate captains: J. J. Daigneault; Vincent Damphousse; Mike Keane (Oct.–Apr.)
- Arena: Montreal Forum
- Average attendance: 16,964
- Minor league affiliates: Fredericton Canadiens; Wheeling Thunderbirds

Team leaders
- Goals: Mark Recchi (14)
- Assists: Vincent Damphousse (30)
- Points: Mark Recchi (43)
- Penalty minutes: Lyle Odelein (152)
- Plus/minus: Vincent Damphousse (+15)
- Wins: Patrick Roy (17)
- Goals against average: Patrick Roy (2.97)

The 1994–95 Montreal Canadiens season was the team's 86th season of play and the last full season in the Montreal Forum before moving to the new Molson Centre. For the first time since the 1969–70 season (and only the third time since 1939–40 season, the Canadiens failed to qualify for the Stanley Cup playoffs.

== Off-season ==
In the 1994 NHL entry draft, the Canadiens selected defenceman Brad Brown with their first-round pick, 18th overall. The Canadiens were more fortunate with their second-round pick, selecting Jose Theodore 44th overall.

In August 1994, captain Guy Carbonneau was traded to the St. Louis Blues. Kirk Muller was named his replacement as captain.

== Regular season ==
The season started later and was abbreviated by a lockout of the players by the NHL owners; the regular season was only 48 games. It was a forgettable season for the Canadiens and their fans, as the team missed the playoffs for the first time in 25 years. The Canadiens only won 3 of 24 games on the road. Already gone at the season's debut were several important members of the 1992–93 Stanley Cup champion team, including Guy Carbonneau, Kevin Haller, Stephan Lebeau, and Denis Savard. On February 9, more players from the 1992–93 team departed, as Eric Desjardins, Gilbert Dionne, and John LeClair were traded to the Philadelphia Flyers in exchange for Mark Recchi. Another major trade nearly two months later on April 5 would send Craig Darby, Mathieu Schneider and fan favourite Kirk Muller to the New York Islanders in exchange for Vladimir Malakhov and Pierre Turgeon. The team subsequently named forward Mike Keane as its new captain. After a 7–5–4 start, Montreal won only 11 of its final 32 games, going 11–18–3. It was the first and only season of goaltender Patrick Roy's NHL playing career in which he lost more games than he won, and the only season of his NHL playing career that his team did not make the playoffs.

The Canadiens tied the Florida Panthers and the Ottawa Senators for the fewest shorthanded goals scored during the regular season with one.

=== Final standings ===
Northeast Division
No.	CR		GP	W	L	T	GF	GA	Pts
1	1	**Quebec Nordiques**	48	30	13	5	185	134	65
2	3	**Pittsburgh Penguins**	48	29	16	3	181	158	61
3	4	**Boston Bruins**	48	27	18	3	150	127	57
4	7	**Buffalo Sabres**	48	22	19	7	130	119	51
5	10	Hartford Whalers	48	19	24	5	127	141	43
6	11	Montreal Canadiens	48	18	23	7	125	148	43
7	14	Ottawa Senators	48	9	34	5	117	174	23

Eastern Conference
R		Div	GP	W	L	T	GF	GA	Pts
**1**	**Quebec Nordiques**	**NE**	**48**	**30**	**13**	**5**	**185**	**134**	65
**2**	**Philadelphia Flyers**	**AT**	**48**	**28**	**16**	**4**	**150**	**132**	60
**3**	**Pittsburgh Penguins**	**NE**	**48**	**29**	**16**	**3**	**181**	**158**	61
**4**	**Boston Bruins**	**NE**	**48**	**27**	**18**	**3**	**150**	**127**	57
**5**	**New Jersey Devils**	**AT**	**48**	**22**	**18**	**8**	**136**	**121**	52
**6**	**Washington Capitals**	**AT**	**48**	**22**	**18**	**8**	**136**	**120**	52
**7**	**Buffalo Sabres**	**NE**	**48**	**22**	**19**	**7**	**130**	**119**	51
**8**	**New York Rangers**	**AT**	**48**	**22**	**23**	**3**	**139**	**134**	47
9	Florida Panthers	AT	48	20	22	6	115	127	46
10	Hartford Whalers	NE	48	19	24	5	127	141	43
11	Montreal Canadiens	NE	48	18	23	7	125	148	43
12	Tampa Bay Lightning	AT	48	17	28	3	120	144	37
13	New York Islanders	AT	48	15	28	5	126	158	35
14	Ottawa Senators	NE	48	9	34	5	117	174	23

Divisions: AT – Atlantic, NE – Northeast

bold – Qualified for playoffs

== Schedule and results ==
1994–95 regular season
January: 2–2–1 (home: 2–0–1; road: 0–2–0)

Game	Date	Score	Opponent	Record	Recap
1	January 21, 1995	2–5	@ New York Rangers	0–1–0	L
2	January 25, 1995	2–0	Washington Capitals	1–1–0	W
3	January 28, 1995	5–1	New Jersey Devils	2–1–0	W
4	January 29, 1995	2–2 OT	Philadelphia Flyers	2–1–1	T
5	January 31, 1995	1–4	@ Tampa Bay Lightning	2–2–1	L

February: 5–6–3 (home: 3–1–1; road: 2–5–2)

Game	Date	Score	Opponent	Record	Recap
6	February 2, 1995	1–1 OT	@ Florida Panthers	2–2–2	T
7	February 4, 1995	4–2	New York Islanders	3–2–2	W
8	February 7, 1995	4–7	@ Boston Bruins	3–3–2	L
9	February 8, 1995	4–2	@ Ottawa Senators	4–3–2	W
10	February 11, 1995	1–3	@ Pittsburgh Penguins	4–4–2	L
11	February 13, 1995	2–2 OT	Hartford Whalers	4–4–3	T
12	February 15, 1995	1–4	@ Hartford Whalers	4–5–3	L
13	February 16, 1995	2–2 OT	@ New York Rangers	4–5–4	T
14	February 18, 1995	5–2	New York Rangers	5–5–4	W
15	February 20, 1995	3–2 OT	New York Islanders	6–5–4	W
16	February 23, 1995	5–2	@ Florida Panthers	7–5–4	W
17	February 25, 1995	0–7	Philadelphia Flyers	7–6–4	L
18	February 27, 1995	1–6	@ New Jersey Devils	7–7–4	L
19	February 28, 1995	1–2	@ New York Islanders	7–8–4	L

March: 4–7–1 (home: 4–1–1; road: 0–6–0)

Game	Date	Score	Opponent	Record	Recap
20	March 4, 1995	1–5	@ Washington Capitals	7–9–4	L
21	March 5, 1995	1–4	@ Buffalo Sabres	7–10–4	L
22	March 8, 1995	2–2 OT	Buffalo Sabres	7–10–5	T
23	March 11, 1995	3–1	New York Rangers	8–10–5	W
24	March 13, 1995	2–4	@ Pittsburgh Penguins	8–11–5	L
25	March 15, 1995	8–5	Pittsburgh Penguins	9–11–5	W
26	March 16, 1995	0–6	@ Boston Bruins	9–12–5	L
27	March 18, 1995	5–4	Quebec Nordiques	10–12–5	W
28	March 20, 1995	4–8	@ Philadelphia Flyers	10–13–5	L
29	March 22, 1995	2–3	Florida Panthers	10–14–5	L
30	March 25, 1995	3–1	Ottawa Senators	11–14–5	W
31	March 27, 1995	2–3 OT	@ Tampa Bay Lightning	11–15–5	L

April: 7–6–2 (home: 6–2–1; road: 1–4–1)

Game	Date	Score	Opponent	Record	Recap
32	April 1, 1995	1–4	@ New Jersey Devils	11–16–5	L
33	April 3, 1995	5–4	@ Ottawa Senators	12–16–5	W
34	April 5, 1995	6–5	Quebec Nordiques	13–16–5	W
35	April 6, 1995	2–3	@ Quebec Nordiques	13–17–5	L
36	April 8, 1995	2–1	Pittsburgh Penguins	14–17–5	W
37	April 10, 1995	2–1	New Jersey Devils	15–17–5	W
38	April 12, 1995	2–3	@ Philadelphia Flyers	15–18–5	L
39	April 14, 1995	3–4 OT	@ Hartford Whalers	15–19–5	L
40	April 15, 1995	2–3	Boston Bruins	15–20–5	L
41	April 17, 1995	5–2	Washington Capitals	16–20–5	W
42	April 19, 1995	4–1	Ottawa Senators	17–20–5	W
43	April 22, 1995	3–1	Tampa Bay Lightning	18–20–5	W
44	April 24, 1995	3–4	Hartford Whalers	18–21–5	L
45	April 26, 1995	1–1 OT	@ Quebec Nordiques	18–21–6	T
46	April 29, 1995	3–3 OT	Buffalo Sabres	18–21–7	T

May: 0–2–0 (home: 0–1–0; road: 0–1–0)

Game	Date	Score	Opponent	Record	Recap
47	May 1, 1995	0–2	@ Buffalo Sabres	18–22–7	L
48	May 3, 1995	2–4	Boston Bruins	18–23–7	L

Legend: W Win (2 points) L Loss (0 points) T Tie (1 point)

== Player statistics ==
=== Scoring ===
- Position abbreviations: C = Centre; D = Defence; G = Goaltender; LW = Left wing; RW = Right wing
- † = Joined team via a transaction (e.g., trade, waivers, signing) during the season. Stats reflect time with the Canadiens only.
- ‡ = Left team via a transaction (e.g., trade, waivers, release) during the season. Stats reflect time with the Canadiens only.

No.	Player	Pos	Regular season					
No.	Player	Pos	GP	G	A	Pts	+/-	PIM
8	Mark Recchi†	RW	39	14	29	43	−3	16
25	Vincent Damphousse	C	48	10	30	40	15	42
22	Benoit Brunet	LW	45	7	18	25	7	16
77	Pierre Turgeon†	C	15	11	9	20	12	4
12	Mike Keane	RW	48	10	10	20	5	15
27	Mathieu Schneider‡	D	30	5	15	20	−3	49
49	Brian Savage	LW	37	12	7	19	5	27
11	Kirk Muller‡	LW	33	8	11	19	−21	33
23	Brian Bellows	LW	41	8	8	16	−7	8
43	Patrice Brisebois	D	35	4	8	12	−2	26
29	Yves Racine	D	47	4	7	11	−1	42
24	Lyle Odelein	D	48	3	7	10	−13	152
15	Paul DiPietro‡	C	22	4	5	9	−3	4
48	J. J. Daigneault	D	45	3	5	8	2	40
30	Turner Stevenson	RW	41	6	1	7	0	86
44	Bryan Fogarty	D	21	5	2	7	−3	34
28	Eric Desjardins‡	D	9	0	6	6	2	2
6	Oleg Petrov	RW	12	2	3	5	−7	4
17	John LeClair‡	LW	9	1	4	5	−1	10
38	Vladimir Malakhov†	D	14	1	4	5	−2	14
31	Ed Ronan	RW	30	1	4	5	−7	12
34	Peter Popovic	D	33	0	5	5	−10	8
18	Valeri Bure	RW	24	3	1	4	−1	6
45	Gilbert Dionne‡	LW	6	0	3	3	−3	2
35	Donald Brashear	LW	20	1	1	2	−5	63
14	Craig Darby‡	C	10	0	2	2	−5	0
28	Craig Conroy	C	6	1	0	1	−1	0
17	Mark Lamb†	C	39	1	0	1	−13	18
52	Craig Rivet	D	5	0	1	1	2	5
33	Patrick Roy	G	43	0	1	1		20
26	Yves Sarault	LW	8	0	1	1	−1	0
46	Craig Ferguson	C	1	0	0	0	0	0
36	Gerry Fleming	LW	6	0	0	0	−1	17
26	Jim Montgomery‡	C	5	0	0	0	−2	2
57	Chris Murray	RW	3	0	0	0	0	4
32	Mario Roberge	LW	9	0	0	0	−2	34
20	Pierre Sevigny	LW	19	0	0	0	−5	15
1	Ron Tugnutt	G	7	0	0	0		0
56	David Wilkie	D	1	0	0	0	0	0

=== Goaltending ===
No.	Player	Regular season									
No.	Player	GP	W	L	T	SA	GA	GAA	SV%	SO	TOI
33	Patrick Roy	43	17	20	6	1357	127	2.97	.906	1	2566
1	Ron Tugnutt	7	1	3	1	172	18	3.12	.895	0	346

== Awards and records ==
=== Awards ===
Type	Award/honour	Recipient	Ref
Team	Jacques Beauchamp Molson Trophy	Benoit Brunet	
Team	Molson Cup	Patrick Roy	

=== Milestones ===
Milestone	Player	Date	Ref
First game	Craig Darby	February 8, 1995	
First game	Craig Conroy	February 15, 1995	
First game	Valeri Bure	February 28, 1995	
First game	Yves Sarault	March 25, 1995	
First game	Chris Murray	April 12, 1995	
First game	David Wilkie	April 14, 1995	
First game	Craig Rivet	April 15, 1995	
500th game played	Patrick Roy	February 20, 1995	

== Transactions ==
- February 9, 1995: Montreal traded John LeClair, Eric Desjardins and Gilbert Dionne to the Philadelphia Flyers in exchange for Mark Recchi and Philadelphia's third-round pick in the 1995 NHL entry draft (used to select (Martin Hohenberger). LeClair gelled immediately with new Flyers line-mate Eric Lindros and quickly became one of the NHL's most feared goal-scorers.
- April 5, 1995: Montreal acquired Pierre Turgeon and Vladimir Malakhov from the New York Islanders in exchange for Kirk Muller, Mathieu Schneider and Craig Darby.

== Draft picks ==
Montreal's draft picks at the 1994 NHL entry draft in Hartford, Connecticut.

Round	#	Player	Position	Nationality	College/Junior/Club team
1	18	Brad Brown	Defence	Canada	North Bay Centennials (OHL)
2	44	Jose Theodore	Goaltender	Canada	Saint-Jean Lynx (QMJHL)
3	54	Chris Murray	Right wing	Canada	Kamloops Blazers (WHL)
3	70	Marko Kiprusoff	Defence	Finland	TPS (Finland)
3	74	Martin Belanger	Defence	Canada	Granby Bisons (QMJHL)
4	96	Arto Kuki	Centre	Finland	Espoo Blues (Finland)
5	122	Jimmy Drolet	Defence	Canada	Saint-Hyacinthe Laser (QMJHL)
6	148	Joel Irving	Centre	Canada	Regina Pat Canadiens (Midget AAA)
7	174	Jessie Rezansoff	Right wing	Canada	Regina Pats (WHL)
8	200	Peter Strom	Left wing	Sweden	Frölunda HC (Sweden)
9	226	Tomas Vokoun	Goaltender	Czech Republic	HC Kladno (Czech Republic)
10	252	Chris Aldous	Defence	United States	Northwood School (USHS-NY)
11	278	Ross Parsons	Defence	Canada	Regina Pats (WHL)

== See also ==
- 1994–95 NHL season
