= 1994–95 Quebec Nordiques season =

National Hockey League team season

1994–95 Quebec Nordiques
- Northeast Division champions
- Division: 1st Northeast
- Conference: 1st Eastern
- 1994–95 record: 30–13–5
- Home record: 19–1–4
- Road record: 11–12–1
- Goals for: 185
- Goals against: 134

Team information
- General manager: Pierre Lacroix
- Coach: Marc Crawford
- Captain: Joe Sakic
- Alternate captains: Wendel Clark; Mike Ricci
- Arena: Colisée de Québec
- Average attendance: 14,397 (93.4%)
- Minor league affiliate: Cornwall Aces (AHL)

Team leaders
- Goals: Owen Nolan (30)
- Assists: Joe Sakic (43)
- Points: Joe Sakic (62)
- Penalty minutes: Chris Simon (106)
- Plus/minus: Curtis Leschyshyn (+29)
- Wins: Stephane Fiset (17)
- Goals against average: Jocelyn Thibault (2.34)

The 1994–95 Quebec Nordiques season was the 24th season of operation of the Nordiques and the last season that the team played in Quebec. The Nordiques finished first in the Eastern Conference, but lost in the first round to the New York Rangers. After the season, the club was sold and relocated to Denver, Colorado.

== Regular season ==
The Nordiques exploded out of the gate, winning five-straight games and 12 of their first 13. Although they were terrible on the road, going just 11–12–1, the Nordiques had the best home record in the league: 19–1–4. Quebec's only defeat at home came on February 27 in a 7–5 loss to the Pittsburgh Penguins. Captain Joe Sakic finished fourth in the league in points (62), Owen Nolan tied for third in the league in goals (30) and finished first in the league in game-winning goals (8), while Peter Forsberg led all rookies in points (50). Forsberg went on to win the Calder Memorial Trophy as the NHL's top rookie of the 1994–95 season. The team finished first in scoring in the league with 185 goals and was one of only two Eastern Conference teams to score at least one goal in all of their 48 regular-season games (the Buffalo Sabres were the other team). Quebec went on to finish first in the Eastern Conference with 65 points. The Nordiques tied the Flyers for most hat-tricks scored during the regular season, with six. Owen Nolan had three, while Wendel Clark, Uwe Krupp and Scott Young each had one.

=== Season standings ===
Northeast Division
No.	CR		GP	W	L	T	GF	GA	Pts
1	1	**Quebec Nordiques**	48	30	13	5	185	134	65
2	3	**Pittsburgh Penguins**	48	29	16	3	181	158	61
3	4	**Boston Bruins**	48	27	18	3	150	127	57
4	7	**Buffalo Sabres**	48	22	19	7	130	119	51
5	10	Hartford Whalers	48	19	24	5	127	141	43
6	11	Montreal Canadiens	48	18	23	7	125	148	43
7	14	Ottawa Senators	48	9	34	5	117	174	23

Eastern Conference
R		Div	GP	W	L	T	GF	GA	Pts
**1**	**Quebec Nordiques**	**NE**	**48**	**30**	**13**	**5**	**185**	**134**	65
**2**	**Philadelphia Flyers**	**AT**	**48**	**28**	**16**	**4**	**150**	**132**	60
**3**	**Pittsburgh Penguins**	**NE**	**48**	**29**	**16**	**3**	**181**	**158**	61
**4**	**Boston Bruins**	**NE**	**48**	**27**	**18**	**3**	**150**	**127**	57
**5**	**New Jersey Devils**	**AT**	**48**	**22**	**18**	**8**	**136**	**121**	52
**6**	**Washington Capitals**	**AT**	**48**	**22**	**18**	**8**	**136**	**120**	52
**7**	**Buffalo Sabres**	**NE**	**48**	**22**	**19**	**7**	**130**	**119**	51
**8**	**New York Rangers**	**AT**	**48**	**22**	**23**	**3**	**139**	**134**	47
9	Florida Panthers	AT	48	20	22	6	115	127	46
10	Hartford Whalers	NE	48	19	24	5	127	141	43
11	Montreal Canadiens	NE	48	18	23	7	125	148	43
12	Tampa Bay Lightning	AT	48	17	28	3	120	144	37
13	New York Islanders	AT	48	15	28	5	126	158	35
14	Ottawa Senators	NE	48	9	34	5	117	174	23

Divisions: AT – Atlantic, NE – Northeast

bold – Qualified for playoffs

== Playoffs ==
The Nordiques faced the New York Rangers in the first round of the 1995 NHL playoffs. On paper, the Nordiques were the clear favorite, since they had a much better record and had won the season series against the Rangers. However, New York's players had more playoff experience, since most of them had been members of the 1994 Stanley Cup champion team. This fact, combined with the Nordiques players' playoff inexperience and inability to maintain their effective power play, proved to be the ultimate factors in the series, as New York defeated Quebec in six games. Although each team had allowed only 134 goals during the regular season (tied for 9th in the league), it was an offensive series, as 44 goals were scored (25 by New York, 19 by Quebec) over the six games.

== Schedule and results ==
=== Regular season ===
1994–95 regular season
January: 5–0–0 (home: 3–0–0; road: 2–0–0)

Game	Date	Score	Opponent	Record	Attendance	Recap
1	January 21, 1995	3–1	@ Philadelphia Flyers (1994–95)	1–0–0	17,380	W
2	January 24, 1995	5–1	Washington Capitals (1994–95)	2–0–0	14,277	W
3	January 27, 1995	7–3	@ Buffalo Sabres (1994–95)	3–0–0	16,232	W
4	January 28, 1995	2–0	New York Rangers (1994–95)	4–0–0	14,382	W
5	January 31, 1995	5–2	Philadelphia Flyers (1994–95)	5–0–0	14,141	W

February: 8–4–2 (home: 3–1–2; road: 5–3–0)

Game	Date	Score	Opponent	Record	Attendance	Recap
6	February 2, 1995	4–5	@ New Jersey Devils (1994–95)	5–1–0	12,096	L
7	February 4, 1995	2–0	New Jersey Devils (1994–95)	6–1–0	13,220	W
8	February 5, 1995	3–1	Hartford Whalers (1994–95)	7–1–0	13,207	W
9	February 8, 1995	3–2	@ Hartford Whalers (1994–95)	8–1–0	8,032	W
10	February 9, 1995	4–3	@ Boston Bruins (1994–95)	9–1–0	14,448	W
11	February 11, 1995	5–2	Ottawa Senators (1994–95)	10–1–0	14,231	W
12	February 14, 1995	3–2	@ New York Islanders (1994–95)	11–1–0	10,225	W
13	February 16, 1995	4–2	@ Philadelphia Flyers (1994–95)	12–1–0	17,065	W
14	February 18, 1995	2–4	@ Washington Capitals (1994–95)	12–2–0	13,410	L
15	February 19, 1995	4–1	@ Florida Panthers (1994–95)	13–2–0	14,703	W
16	February 21, 1995	4–5	@ Pittsburgh Penguins (1994–95)	13–3–0	17,181	L
17	February 23, 1995	6–6 OT	Philadelphia Flyers (1994–95)	13–3–1	13,301	T
18	February 25, 1995	1–1 OT	Boston Bruins (1994–95)	13–3–2	14,389	T
19	February 27, 1995	5–7	Pittsburgh Penguins (1994–95)	13–4–2	15,399	L

March: 10–4–1 (home: 7–0–1; road: 3–4–0)

Game	Date	Score	Opponent	Record	Attendance	Recap
20	March 1, 1995	8–2	Tampa Bay Lightning (1994–95)	14–4–2	13,131	W
21	March 4, 1995	1–1 OT	Buffalo Sabres (1994–95)	14–4–3	13,517	T
22	March 6, 1995	6–3	New Jersey Devils (1994–95)	15–4–3	13,178	W
23	March 7, 1995	5–4	@ Pittsburgh Penguins (1994–95)	16–4–3	17,181	W
24	March 9, 1995	1–2	@ Hartford Whalers (1994–95)	16–5–3	8,886	L
25	March 11, 1995	2–1	New York Islanders (1994–95)	17–5–3	14,525	W
26	March 16, 1995	3–2	Pittsburgh Penguins (1994–95)	18–5–3	15,399	W
27	March 18, 1995	4–5	@ Montreal Canadiens (1994–95)	18–6–3	17,959	L
28	March 20, 1995	5–4 OT	Florida Panthers (1994–95)	19–6–3	13,013	W
29	March 22, 1995	6–2	Boston Bruins (1994–95)	20–6–3	14,096	W
30	March 25, 1995	2–1	New York Rangers (1994–95)	21–6–3	15,399	W
31	March 26, 1995	11–4	@ Ottawa Senators (1994–95)	22–6–3	10,171	W
32	March 28, 1995	3–5	@ Buffalo Sabres (1994–95)	22–7–3	14,899	L
33	March 30, 1995	5–4	@ New York Rangers (1994–95)	23–7–3	18,200	W
34	March 31, 1995	4–6	@ Washington Capitals (1994–95)	23–8–3	13,629	L

April: 6–5–2 (home: 5–0–1; road: 1–5–1)

Game	Date	Score	Opponent	Record	Attendance	Recap
35	April 2, 1995	7–5	Ottawa Senators (1994–95)	24–8–3	14,335	W
36	April 5, 1995	5–6	@ Montreal Canadiens (1994–95)	24–9–3	17,469	L
37	April 6, 1995	3–2	Montreal Canadiens (1994–95)	25–9–3	15,399	W
38	April 8, 1995	2–2 OT	@ Ottawa Senators (1994–95)	25–9–4	10,575	T
39	April 12, 1995	4–0	@ Boston Bruins (1994–95)	26–9–4	14,448	W
40	April 14, 1995	5–2	Buffalo Sabres (1994–95)	27–9–4	15,399	W
41	April 16, 1995	4–2	Washington Capitals (1994–95)	28–9–4	15,325	W
42	April 18, 1995	2–5	@ New York Islanders (1994–95)	28–10–4	13,758	L
43	April 20, 1995	2–5	@ Tampa Bay Lightning (1994–95)	28–11–4	17,705	L
44	April 22, 1995	2–4	@ Florida Panthers (1994–95)	28–12–4	14,703	L
45	April 26, 1995	1–1 OT	Montreal Canadiens (1994–95)	28–12–5	15,399	T
46	April 29, 1995	4–1	Tampa Bay Lightning (1994–95)	29–12–5	15,399	W
47	April 30, 1995	2–4	@ New Jersey Devils (1994–95)	29–13–5	16,129	L

May: 1–0–0 (home: 1–0–0; road: 0–0–0)

Game	Date	Score	Opponent	Record	Attendance	Recap
48	May 3, 1995	4–1	Hartford Whalers (1994–95)	30–13–5	15,399	W

Legend: W Win (2 points) L Loss (0 points) T Tie (1 point)

=== Playoffs ===
1995 Stanley Cup playoffs
Eastern Conference Quarterfinals vs. (8) New York Rangers – Rangers win 4–2

Game	Date	Score	Opponent	Series	Recap
1	May 6, 1995	5–4	New York Rangers	Nordiques lead 1–0	W
2	May 8, 1995	3–8	New York Rangers	Series tied 1–1	L
3	May 10, 1995	3–4	@ New York Rangers	Rangers lead 2–1	L
4	May 12, 1995	2–3 OT	@ New York Rangers	Rangers lead 3–1	L
5	May 14, 1995	4–2	New York Rangers	Rangers lead 3–2	W
6	May 16, 1995	2–4	@ New York Rangers	Rangers win 4–2	L

Legend: W Win L Loss

== Player statistics ==
=== Scoring ===
- Position abbreviations: C = Centre; D = Defence; G = Goaltender; LW = Left wing; RW = Right wing
- † = Joined team via a transaction (e.g., trade, waivers, signing) during the season. Stats reflect time with the Nordiques only.
- ‡ = Left team via a transaction (e.g., trade, waivers, release) during the season. Stats reflect time with the Nordiques only.

No.	Player	Pos	Regular season						Playoffs					
No.	Player	Pos	GP	G	A	Pts	+/-	PIM	GP	G	A	Pts	+/-	PIM
19	Joe Sakic	C	47	19	43	62	7	30	6	4	1	5	−4	0
21	Peter Forsberg	C	47	15	35	50	17	16	6	2	4	6	2	4
11	Owen Nolan	RW	46	30	19	49	21	46	6	2	3	5	2	6
48	Scott Young	RW	48	18	21	39	9	14	6	3	3	6	3	2
9	Mike Ricci	C	48	15	21	36	5	40	6	1	3	4	4	8
17	Wendel Clark	LW	37	12	18	30	−1	45	6	1	2	3	−6	6
13	Valeri Kamensky	LW	40	10	20	30	3	22	2	1	0	1	0	0
28	Bob Bassen	C	47	12	15	27	14	33	5	2	4	6	2	0
51	Andrei Kovalenko	RW	45	14	10	24	−4	31	6	0	1	1	−3	2
4	Uwe Krupp	D	44	6	17	23	14	20	5	0	2	2	−2	2
18	Adam Deadmarsh	RW	48	9	8	17	16	56	6	0	1	1	−3	0
7	Curtis Leschyshyn	D	44	2	13	15	29	20	3	0	1	1	−1	4
2	Sylvain Lefebvre	D	48	2	11	13	13	17	6	0	2	2	5	2
47	Claude Lapointe	C	29	4	8	12	5	41	5	0	0	0	−1	8
12	Chris Simon	LW	29	3	9	12	14	106	6	1	1	2	−1	19
25	Martin Rucinsky	LW	20	3	6	9	5	14	—	—	—	—	—	—
6	Craig Wolanin	D	40	3	6	9	12	40	6	1	1	2	5	4
52	Adam Foote	D	35	0	7	7	17	52	6	0	1	1	−3	14
23	Paul MacDermid	RW	14	3	1	4	3	22	3	0	0	0	0	2
15	Bill Huard†	LW	7	2	2	4	2	13	1	0	0	0	−1	0
5	Alexei Gusarov	D	14	1	2	3	−1	6	—	—	—	—	—	—
14	Dwayne Norris	RW	13	1	2	3	1	2	—	—	—	—	—	—
20	Rene Corbet	LW	8	0	3	3	3	2	2	0	1	1	1	0
29	Steven Finn	D	40	0	3	3	1	64	4	0	1	1	−4	2
35	Stephane Fiset	G	32	0	3	3		2	4	0	0	0		0
22	Janne Laukkanen	D	11	0	3	3	3	4	6	1	0	1	−2	2
31	Aaron Miller	D	9	0	3	3	2	6	—	—	—	—	—	—
24	Jon Klemm	D	4	1	0	1	3	2	—	—	—	—	—	—
59	Dave Karpa‡	D	2	0	0	0	−1	0	—	—	—	—	—	—
1	Garth Snow	G	2	0	0	0		0	1	0	0	0		0
41	Jocelyn Thibault	G	18	0	0	0		0	3	0	0	0		0

=== Goaltending ===
No.	Player	Regular season										Playoffs								
No.	Player	GP	W	L	T	SA	GA	GAA	SV%	SO	TOI	GP	W	L	SA	GA	GAA	SV%	SO	TOI
35	Stephane Fiset	32	17	10	3	968	87	2.78	.910	2	1879	4	1	2	115	16	4.60	.861	0	209
41	Jocelyn Thibault	18	12	2	2	423	35	2.34	.917	1	898	3	1	2	76	8	3.24	.895	0	148
1	Garth Snow	2	1	1	0	63	11	5.54	.825	0	119	1	0	0	3	1	6.78	.667	0	9

== Awards and records ==
=== Awards ===
Type	Award/honour	Recipient	Ref
League (annual)	Calder Memorial Trophy	Peter Forsberg	
League (annual)	Jack Adams Award	Marc Crawford	
League (annual)	NHL All-Rookie Team	Peter Forsberg (Forward)	
League (in-season)	NHL Rookie of the Month	Peter Forsberg (April)	
Team	O'Keefe Cup	Joe Sakic	

=== Milestones ===
Milestone	Player	Date	Ref
First game	Adam Deadmarsh	January 21, 1995	
First game	Peter Forsberg	January 21, 1995	
First game	Janne Laukkanen	January 24, 1995	

== Transactions ==
The Nordiques were involved in the following transactions during the 1994-95 season.

=== Trades ===
March 8, 1995	To Anaheim Mighty Ducks Dave Karpa	To Quebec Nordiques Conditional draft pick in 1997
March 23, 1995	To Calgary Flames Ed Ward	To Quebec Nordiques Francois Groleau
April 7, 1995	To Ottawa Senators Mika Stromberg; 4th round pick in 1995 (Kevin Boyd)	To Quebec Nordiques Bill Huard

=== Free agents ===
Player	New Team
Niklas Andersson	New York Islanders
Len Esau	Calgary Flames

== Draft picks ==
Quebec's draft picks at the 1994 NHL entry draft in Hartford, Connecticut.

Round	Pick	Player	Nationality	College/junior/club team
1	12	Wade Belak (RW)	Canada	Saskatoon Blades (WHL)
1	22	Jeff Kealty (D)	United States	Catholic Memorial High School (USHS-MA)
2	35	Josef Marha (C)	Czech Republic	Dukla Jihlava (Czech Republic)
3	61	Sebastien Bety (D)	Canada	Drummondville Voltigeurs (QMJHL)
3	72	Chris Drury (C)	United States	Fairfield College Preparatory School (USHS-CT)
4	87	Milan Hejduk (RW)	Czech Republic	HC Pardubice (Czech Republic)
5	113	Tony Tuzzolino (RW)	United States	Michigan State University (CCHA)
6	139	Nicholas Windsor (D)	Canada	Cornwall Colts (COJHL)
7	165	Calvin Elfring (D)	Canada	Powell River Paper Kings (BCHL)
8	191	Jay Bertsch (RW)	Canada	Spokane Chiefs (WHL)
9	217	Tim Thomas (G)	United States	University of Vermont (Hockey East)
10	243	Chris Pittman (C)	Canada	Kitchener Rangers (OHL)
11	285	Steve Low (D)	Canada	Sherbrooke Faucons (QMJHL)
S	9	Reid Simonton (D)	Canada	Union College (ECAC Hockey)

== Relocation to Denver, Colorado ==
Had the Nordiques stayed in Quebec City instead of heading for Denver, this would have been the franchise's new logo starting in 1995–96.

In the 1994–95 shortened season of 48 games, the Nordiques played well and finished with the best record in the Eastern Conference. The team faltered in the postseason and was eliminated in the first round by the defending Stanley Cup champion New York Rangers.

The playoff loss proved to be Quebec's swan song in the NHL as the team's financial troubles increasingly took center stage, even in the face of renewed fan support over the previous three years. The league's Canadian teams (with the exception of Montreal, Toronto, and to a lesser extent, Vancouver) found it difficult to compete in a new age of rising player salaries without a salary cap. Aubut unsuccessfully petitioned for a bailout from the Government of Quebec. In May 1995, shortly after the Nordiques were eliminated from the playoffs, Aubut chose to sell the team to a group of investors in Denver, Colorado. The franchise was moved to Denver where it was renamed the Colorado Avalanche. The Avalanche won the Stanley Cup in their first season after the move, and added another in 2001, and a third in 2022.

The Nordiques had planned to change their logo, colours, and uniforms for the 1995–96 season, and the new design had already appeared in the Canadian press.
