= Mike Bales =

Canadian ice hockey player (born 1971)

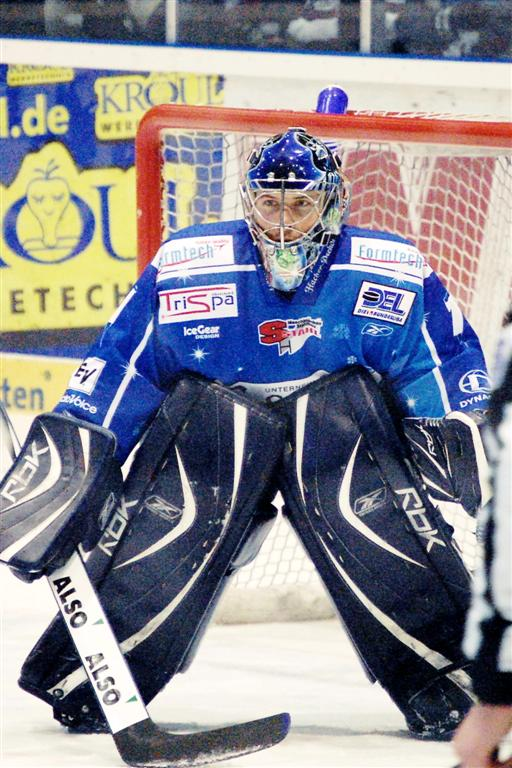
- Bales with the Straubing Tigers in 2007.
- Born: August 6, 1971 (age 55) Saskatoon, Saskatchewan, Canada
- Height: 6 ft 1 in (185 cm)
- Weight: 187 lb (85 kg; 13 st 5 lb)
- Position: Goaltender
- Shot: Left
- Played for: Boston Bruins; Ottawa Senators; Belfast Giants; ERC Ingolstadt; Leksands IF; Straubing Tigers
- NHL draft: 105th overall, 1990; Boston Bruins
- Playing career: 1991–2010

Michael Raymond Bales (born August 6, 1971) is a Canadian former professional ice hockey goaltender. He played in the National Hockey League over four seasons from 1992 to 1997 with the Boston Bruins and the Ottawa Senators, accumulating a record of 2–15–1 and a goals against average of 4.13 in 23 games. He currently serves as goaltending coach for the NHL's Buffalo Sabres.

== Playing career ==
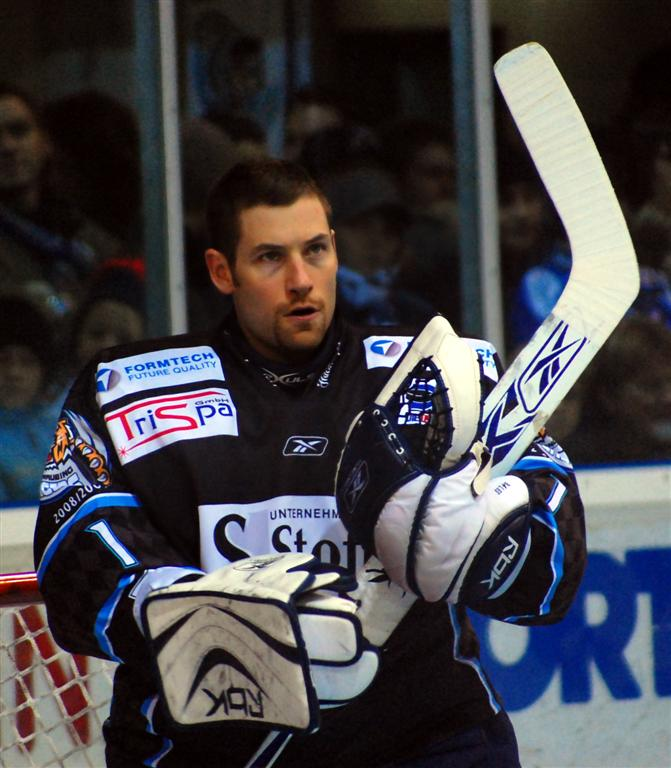
Bales in 2008.

Bales attended Ohio State University, lettering with the Buckeyes from 1990 to 1992, and was drafted by the Boston Bruins in the fifth round, 105th overall, of the 1990 NHL entry draft. Bales' entire career as a Boston Bruin consists of 25 minutes played in one game against the New Jersey Devils on January 9, 1993, during which he gave up one goal. His busiest NHL season was 1995–96, when he appeared in 20 games for Ottawa.

In 2001, Bales moved to play in Europe, beginning with the Belfast Giants in the British Ice Hockey Superleague. He then moved to the Deutsche Eishockey Liga in Germany for ERC Ingolstadt and then to the Elitserien in Sweden for Leksands IF. From 2004 to 2010 he played for the Straubing Tigers where he scored his first career goal during the 2005–06 season with the Tigers. On January 29, 2011, he signed a contract with the Iserlohn Roosters as stand-by-goalie but ultimately never played a game for the team.

== Transactions ==
- Selected by Boston Bruins in fifth round (fourth Bruins pick, 105th overall) of National Hockey League entry draft, June 16, 1990.
- Signed as free agent by Ottawa Senators, July 4, 1994.
- Signed as free agent by Buffalo Sabres, September 9, 1997.
- Signed as free agent by Dallas Stars (two year contract), July 8, 1998.

== Coaching ==
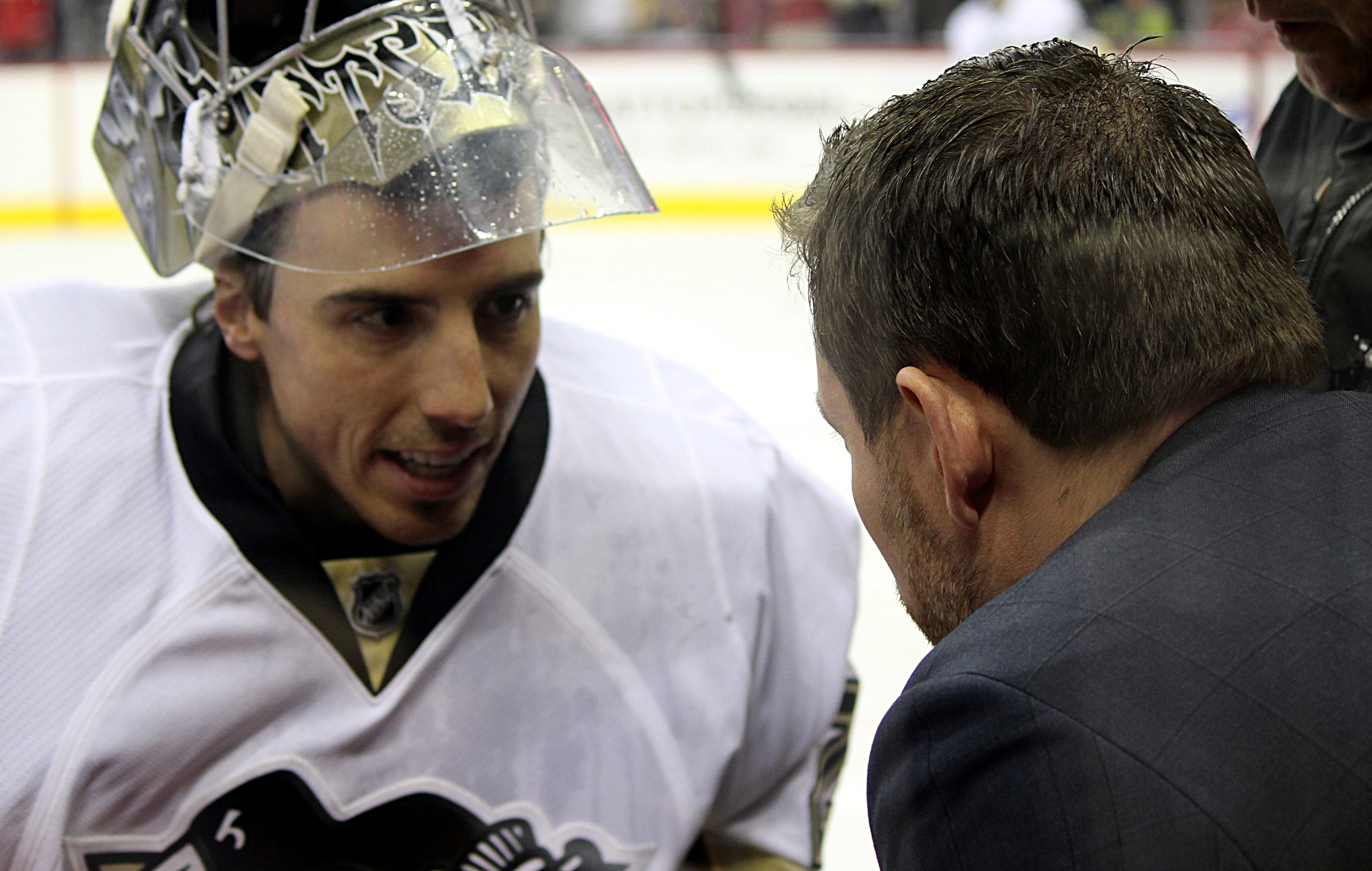
Bales working with Penguins goaltender Marc-Andre Fleury during a game in 2016.

On July 23, 2011, the Pittsburgh Penguins hired Bales as a goaltender development coach and amateur scout.^{1} Bales was promoted to goaltender coach by the Penguins on August 19, 2013. In 2017, he became goaltending coach of the Carolina Hurricanes. On June 12, 2019 Bales resigned from the Hurricanes and became goaltending coach for the Buffalo Sabres.

== Career statistics ==
			Regular season										Playoffs
Season	Team	League	GP	W	L	T	OTL	MIN	GA	SO	GAA	SV%	GP	W	L	T	MIN	GA	SO	GAA	SV%
1988–89	Estevan Bruins	SJHL	44	—	—	—	—	2412	197	1	4.90	—	—	—	—	—	—	—	—	—	—
1989–90	Ohio State University	CCHA	21	6	13	2	—	1117	95	0	5.11	.863	—	—	—	—	—	—	—	—	—
1990–91	Ohio State University	CCHA	39	11	24	3	—	2180	184	0	5.06	.867	—	—	—	—	—	—	—	—	—
1991–92	Ohio State University	CCHA	36	11	20	5	—	2060	180	0	5.24	.853	—	—	—	—	—	—	—	—	—
1992–93	Boston Bruins	NHL	1	0	0	0	—	25	1	0	2.42	.900	—	—	—	—	—	—	—	—	—
1992–93	Providence Bruins	AHL	44	22	17	0	—	2363	166	1	4.21	.872	2	0	2	—	118	8	0	4.07	—
1993–94	Providence Bruins	AHL	33	9	15	4	—	1757	130	0	4.44	.863	—	—	—	—	—	—	—	—	—
1994–95	Ottawa Senators	NHL	1	0	0	0	—	3	0	0	0.00	1.000	—	—	—	—	—	—	—	—	—
1994–95	PEI Senators	AHL	45	25	16	3	—	2649	160	2	3.62	.893	9	6	3	—	530	24	2	2.72	.925
1995–96	Ottawa Senators	NHL	20	2	14	1	—	1040	72	0	4.15	.871	—	—	—	—	—	—	—	—	—
1995–96	PEI Senators	AHL	2	0	2	0	—	118	11	0	5.58	.823	—	—	—	—	—	—	—	—	—
1996–97	Ottawa Senators	NHL	1	0	1	0	—	52	4	0	4.64	.778	—	—	—	—	—	—	—	—	—
1996–97	Baltimore Bandits	AHL	46	13	21	8	—	2544	130	3	3.07	.899	—	—	—	—	—	—	—	—	—
1997–98	Rochester Americans	AHL	39	13	19	5	—	2229	127	0	3.42	.893	—	—	—	—	—	—	—	—	—
1998–99	Michigan K-Wings	IHL	32	11	17	3	—	1773	96	1	3.25	.899	—	—	—	—	—	—	—	—	—
1999–00	Michigan K-Wings	IHL	25	9	9	5	—	1341	56	0	2.50	.920	—	—	—	—	—	—	—	—	—
2000–01	Utah Grizzlies	IHL	50	22	19	3	—	2697	111	5	2.47	.915	—	—	—	—	—	—	—	—	—
2001–02	Belfast Giants	BISL	34	—	—	—	—	1996	77	0	2.31	.920	5	1	2	1	205	10	1	2.93	.913
2002–03	Ingolstadt ERC	DEL	23	—	—	—	—	1323	58	1	2.63	.920	—	—	—	—	—	—	—	—	—
2003–04	Leksands IF	SEL	23	8	14	4	—	1354	66	0	2.92	.904	—	—	—	—	—	—	—	—	—
2004–05	Straubing Tigers	2.GBun	45	—	—	—	—	2741	111	3	2.43	—	13	—	—	—	—	—	—	2.62	—
2005–06	Straubing Tigers	2.GBun	48	—	—	—	—	—	—	—	2.47	—	15	—	—	—	—	—	—	2.08	—
2006–07	Straubing Tigers	DEL	47	—	—	—	—	—	—	—	3.39	.895	—	—	—	—	—	—	—	—	—
2007–08	Straubing Tigers	DEL	47	10	30	—	0	2806	162	1	3.46	.895	—	—	—	—	—	—	—	—	—
2008–09	Straubing Tigers	DEL	32	8	16	—	0	1837	102	1	3.33	.881	—	—	—	—	—	—	—	—	—
2009–10	Straubing Tigers	DEL	33	10	12	—	0	1930	98	1	3.05	.899	—	—	—	—	—	—	—	—	—
NHL totals			23	2	15	1	—	1120	77	0	4.13	.869	—	—	—	—	—	—	—	—	—
