= Greg Andrusak =

Canadian ice hockey player (born 1969)

- Born: November 14, 1969 (age 56) Cranbrook, British Columbia, Canada
- Height: 6 ft 1 in (185 cm)
- Weight: 195 lb (88 kg; 13 st 13 lb)
- Position: Defence
- Shot: Right
- Played for: Pittsburgh Penguins; Toronto Maple Leafs
- National team: Canada
- NHL draft: 88th overall, 1988; Pittsburgh Penguins
- Playing career: 1992–2004

Medal record

Men's ice hockey

Representing Canada

World Championships
Bronze medal – third place	1995 Sweden	

Greg Andrusak (born November 14, 1969) is a Canadian former professional ice hockey player.

Andrusak played 43 games in the National Hockey League for the Pittsburgh Penguins and Toronto Maple Leafs. He scored a goal and scored seven points.

== Career statistics ==
=== Regular season and playoffs ===
			Regular season					Playoffs
Season	Team	League	GP	G	A	Pts	PIM	GP	G	A	Pts	PIM
1986–87	Kelowna Packers	BCJHL	45	10	24	34	95	—	—	—	—	—
1987–88	University of Minnesota-Duluth	WCHA	37	4	5	9	42	—	—	—	—	—
1988–89	University of Minnesota-Duluth	WCHA	35	4	8	12	74	—	—	—	—	—
1988–89	Canadian National Team	Intl	2	0	0	0	0	—	—	—	—	—
1989–90	University of Minnesota-Duluth	WCHA	35	5	29	34	74	—	—	—	—	—
1990–91	Canadian National Team	Intl	53	4	11	15	34	—	—	—	—	—
1991–92	University of Minnesota-Duluth	WCHA	36	7	27	34	125	—	—	—	—	—
1992–93	Cleveland Lumberjacks	IHL	55	3	22	25	78	2	0	0	0	2
1992–93	Muskegon Fury	CoHL	2	0	3	3	7	—	—	—	—	—
1993–94	Pittsburgh Penguins	NHL	3	0	0	0	2	—	—	—	—	—
1993–94	Cleveland Lumberjacks	IHL	69	13	26	39	109	—	—	—	—	—
1994–95	Pittsburgh Penguins	NHL	7	0	4	4	6	—	—	—	—	—
1994–95	Cleveland Lumberjacks	IHL	8	0	8	8	14	—	—	—	—	—
1994–95	Detroit Vipers	IHL	37	5	26	31	50	—	—	—	—	—
1995–96	Detroit Vipers	IHL	58	6	30	36	128	—	—	—	—	—
1995–96	Minnesota Moose	IHL	5	0	4	4	8	—	—	—	—	—
1995–96	Pittsburgh Penguins	NHL	2	0	0	0	0	—	—	—	—	—
1996–97	Eisbären Berlin	DEL	45	5	17	22	170	—	—	—	—	—
1997–98	Eisbären Berlin	DEL	34	3	7	10	65	—	—	—	—	—
1998–99	Pittsburgh Penguins	NHL	7	0	1	1	4	12	1	0	1	6
1998–99	Houston Aeros	IHL	3	0	1	1	2	6	1	4	5	16
1998–99	Eisbären Berlin	DEL	19	2	5	7	12	—	—	—	—	—
1998–99	Genève-Servette HC	NLB	—	3	10	13	0	—	—	—	—	—
1999–00	Toronto Maple Leafs	NHL	9	0	1	1	4	3	0	0	0	2
1999–00	Chicago Wolves	IHL	54	2	23	25	50	11	1	5	6	20
2000–01	Kentucky Thoroughblades	AHL	58	5	14	19	63	2	0	0	0	0
2001–02	Berlin Capitals	DEL	39	4	18	22	78	—	—	—	—	—
2001–02	Lugano	NLA	8	0	4	4	16	—	—	—	—	—
2002–03	Hamburg Freezers	DEL	44	3	19	22	70	5	0	3	3	12
2003–04	EHC Chur	NLB	1	0	0	0	14	—	—	—	—	—
IHL totals			289	29	140	169	439	19	2	9	11	38
NHL totals			28	0	6	6	16	15	1	0	1	8

=== International ===
Year	Team	Event	GP	G	A	Pts	PIM
1995	Canada	WC	5	1	3	4	4
Senior totals			7	0	0	0	12

== Awards and honors ==
Award	Year
All-WCHA First Team	1991–92

== Transactions ==
- On June 11, 1988, the Pittsburgh Penguins selected Greg Andrusak in the fifth-round (#88 overall) of the 1988 NHL draft.
- On July 9, 1999, the Toronto Maple Leafs signed unrestricted free agent Greg Andrusak.
- On August 14, 2000, the San Jose Sharks signed unrestricted free agent Greg Andrusak.
- On January 5, 2002, the HC Lugano (Swiss) signed free agent Greg Andrusak.
