= 1994–95 NHL season =

National Hockey League season

- League: National Hockey League
- Sport: Ice hockey
- Duration: January 20 – June 24, 1995
- Games: 48
- Teams: 26
- TV partner(s): CBC, TSN, SRC (Canada); ESPN, Fox (United States)

Draft
- Top draft pick: Ed Jovanovski
- Picked by: Florida Panthers

Regular season
- Presidents' Trophy: Detroit Red Wings
- Season MVP: Eric Lindros (Flyers)
- Top scorer: Jaromir Jagr (Penguins)

Playoffs
- Playoffs MVP: Claude Lemieux (Devils)

Stanley Cup
- Champions: New Jersey Devils
- Runners-up: Detroit Red Wings

NHL seasons
- 1993–94 1995–96

The 1994–95 NHL season was the 78th regular season of the National Hockey League. The season start was delayed due to a lockout of players imposed by the NHL franchise owners. After a new labour agreement was reached between the owners and the National Hockey League Players' Association (NHLPA), a 48-game season started on January 20. The season ended when the New Jersey Devils swept the heavily favored Detroit Red Wings for their first Stanley Cup win. It was also their first appearance in the finals overall.

== League business ==
=== Entry draft ===
The 1994 NHL entry draft was held on June 28–29, 1994, at the Hartford Civic Center in Hartford, Connecticut. Ed Jovanovski was selected first overall by the Florida Panthers.

=== Lockout ===
On October 1, 1994, the NHL initiated a lockout of the National Hockey League Players' Association (NHLPA). The players had begun training camps a few weeks earlier as if to start the season. However, as these camps came to a close, labour negotiations remained unresolved. The big issue was the implementation of a salary cap. The NHL owners were strongly in favor of the cap while the players were opposed to it. The NHL wanted to levy a luxury tax, a financial penalty that is assigned by the league, on salaries that were higher than the average. However, the National Hockey League Players' Association (NHLPA) viewed that as a variation on a salary cap and refused to accept it. This came right off the heels of the 1992 walkout by players, which interrupted the race for the Stanley Cup. Unlike in the 1992 strike however, it was the owners who wanted to make sure that they got the right deal. Under the leadership of executive director Bob Goodenow, the NHLPA position was that it would be open to a small tax, however the bulk of the financial goals could be achieved through revenue sharing.

After the lockout had dragged on, the talk of salary cap faded and new items entered the debate. Talk of rookie salary cap, changes to the arbitration system, and loosened free agency. However, large market teams such as Toronto, Detroit, the New York Rangers, Dallas, and Philadelphia eventually broke with the league, as they feared that an extended lockout would outweigh the benefits from getting a salary cap and did not want to be the first league in North America to forfeit an entire season just to help out their small-market colleagues.

The lockout ended on January 11, 1995. As a result, the league shortened the season length from 84 games, the length of the previous two seasons, to 48. The regular season would then last from January 20 to May 3, the first time in NHL history that the regular season extended into May. All games were limited to intra-conference play. The NHL and NHLPA agreed to shorten future seasons to 82 games. The NHL All-Star Game, which had been scheduled to take place January 20–21, 1995, in San Jose, California, was canceled; San Jose was then awarded 1997 NHL All-Star Game instead. The lost revenue due to the lockout would eventually contribute in part to three teams relocating: the Quebec Nordiques moved to Denver, Colorado after the 1994–95 season to became the Colorado Avalanche; the Winnipeg Jets relocated to Phoenix, Arizona after the 1995–96 season to became the Phoenix Coyotes; and the Hartford Whalers moved to Greensboro, North Carolina after the 1996–97 season to become the Carolina Hurricanes.

=== Rule changes ===
- Two Zambonis would now be required by every arena for the resurfacing between periods.
- A coach can call for a stick measurement in any overtime period or shootout, but the request must be made before the winning goal is scored.
- Leaving the penalty box to join an altercation on the ice risks automatic three-game ban, plus any other penalties assessed.
- Any severe check from behind risks a major penalty and game misconduct.
- Referees and linesmen would wear numbers instead of nameplates; this restored a practice that had been in use previously from 1955 to 1977.

== Arenas ==
- The Boston Bruins played their final season at the Boston Garden before moving to the FleetCenter.
- The Chicago BlackHawks moved from Chicago Stadium to the United Center.
- The Philadelphia Flyers's home arena, the Spectrum, is renamed the CoreStates Spectrum after CoreStates Financial Corporation acquires the naming rights.
- The St. Louis Blues moved from St. Louis Arena to the Kiel Center.
- The Vancouver Canucks played their last season at Pacific Coliseum before moving to General Motors Place.

== Regular season ==
The lockout delay pushed the start of the 1994–95 season to January 20. The regular season was shortened from 84 games, the length of the previous two seasons, down to 48. Regular season games would be limited to intra-conference play. The shortened regular season ended on May 3, the first time in NHL history that the regular season extended into that month.

The March 10, 1995, Detroit Red Wings–San Jose Sharks game was postponed due to the Guadalupe River flooding, making it impossible for the teams to travel to the San Jose Arena.

This was the first season since 1969–70, that the Montreal Canadiens missed the playoffs.

=== Final standings ===
Atlantic Division
No.	CR		GP	W	L	T	GF	GA	Pts
1	2	**Philadelphia Flyers**	48	28	16	4	150	132	60
2	5	**New Jersey Devils**	48	22	18	8	136	121	52
3	6	**Washington Capitals**	48	22	18	8	136	120	52
4	8	**New York Rangers**	48	22	23	3	139	134	47
5	9	Florida Panthers	48	20	22	6	115	127	46
6	12	Tampa Bay Lightning	48	17	28	3	120	144	37
7	13	New York Islanders	48	15	28	5	126	158	35

Northeast Division
No.	CR		GP	W	L	T	GF	GA	Pts
1	1	**Quebec Nordiques**	48	30	13	5	185	134	65
2	3	**Pittsburgh Penguins**	48	29	16	3	181	158	61
3	4	**Boston Bruins**	48	27	18	3	150	127	57
4	7	**Buffalo Sabres**	48	22	19	7	130	119	51
5	10	Hartford Whalers	48	19	24	5	127	141	43
6	11	Montreal Canadiens	48	18	23	7	125	148	43
7	14	Ottawa Senators	48	9	34	5	117	174	23

Eastern Conference
R		Div	GP	W	L	T	GF	GA	Pts
**1**	**Quebec Nordiques**	**NE**	**48**	**30**	**13**	**5**	**185**	**134**	65
**2**	**Philadelphia Flyers**	**AT**	**48**	**28**	**16**	**4**	**150**	**132**	60
**3**	**Pittsburgh Penguins**	**NE**	**48**	**29**	**16**	**3**	**181**	**158**	61
**4**	**Boston Bruins**	**NE**	**48**	**27**	**18**	**3**	**150**	**127**	57
**5**	**New Jersey Devils**	**AT**	**48**	**22**	**18**	**8**	**136**	**121**	52
**6**	**Washington Capitals**	**AT**	**48**	**22**	**18**	**8**	**136**	**120**	52
**7**	**Buffalo Sabres**	**NE**	**48**	**22**	**19**	**7**	**130**	**119**	51
**8**	**New York Rangers**	**AT**	**48**	**22**	**23**	**3**	**139**	**134**	47
9	Florida Panthers	AT	48	20	22	6	115	127	46
10	Hartford Whalers	NE	48	19	24	5	127	141	43
11	Montreal Canadiens	NE	48	18	23	7	125	148	43
12	Tampa Bay Lightning	AT	48	17	28	3	120	144	37
13	New York Islanders	AT	48	15	28	5	126	158	35
14	Ottawa Senators	NE	48	9	34	5	117	174	23

Divisions: AT – Atlantic, NE – Northeast

bold – Qualified for playoffs

Central Division
No.	CR		GP	W	L	T	GF	GA	Pts
1	1	**Detroit Red Wings**	48	33	11	4	180	117	70
2	2	**St. Louis Blues**	48	28	15	5	178	135	61
3	4	**Chicago Blackhawks**	48	24	19	5	156	115	53
4	5	**Toronto Maple Leafs**	48	21	19	8	135	146	50
5	8	**Dallas Stars**	48	17	23	8	136	135	42
6	10	Winnipeg Jets	48	16	25	7	157	177	39

Pacific Division
No.	CR		GP	W	L	T	GF	GA	Pts
1	2	**Calgary Flames**	48	24	17	7	163	135	55
2	6	**Vancouver Canucks**	48	18	18	12	153	148	48
3	7	**San Jose Sharks**	48	19	25	4	129	161	42
4	9	Los Angeles Kings	48	16	23	9	142	174	41
5	11	Edmonton Oilers	48	17	27	4	136	183	38
6	12	Mighty Ducks of Anaheim	48	16	27	5	125	164	37

Western Conference
R		Div	GP	W	L	T	GF	GA	Pts
**1**	**p – Detroit Red Wings**	**CEN**	**48**	**33**	**11**	**4**	**180**	**117**	**70**
**2**	**x – Calgary Flames**	**PAC**	**48**	**24**	**17**	**7**	**163**	**135**	**55**
**3**	**St. Louis Blues**	**CEN**	**48**	**28**	**15**	**5**	**178**	**135**	**61**
**4**	**Chicago Blackhawks**	**CEN**	**48**	**24**	**19**	**5**	**156**	**115**	**53**
**5**	**Toronto Maple Leafs**	**CEN**	**48**	**21**	**19**	**8**	**135**	**146**	**50**
**6**	**Vancouver Canucks**	**PAC**	**48**	**18**	**18**	**12**	**153**	**148**	**48**
**7**	**San Jose Sharks**	**PAC**	**48**	**19**	**25**	**4**	**129**	**161**	**42**
**8**	**Dallas Stars**	**CEN**	**48**	**17**	**23**	**8**	**136**	**135**	**42**
9	Los Angeles Kings	PAC	48	16	23	9	142	174	41
10	Winnipeg Jets	CEN	48	16	25	7	157	177	39
11	Edmonton Oilers	PAC	48	17	27	4	136	183	38
12	Mighty Ducks of Anaheim	PAC	48	16	27	5	125	164	37

Divisions: CEN – Central, PAC – Pacific

bold – Qualified for playoffs; x – Won division; p – Won Presidents' Trophy

Note: No. = Division rank, CR = Conference rank, W = Wins, L = Losses, T = Ties, GF = Goals For, GA = Goals Against, Pts = Points
Teams that qualified for the playoffs are highlighted in bold.

== Playoffs ==
=== Bracket ===
The top eight teams in each conference made the playoffs, with the two division winners seeded 1–2 based on regular season records, and the six remaining teams seeded 3–8. In each round, teams competed in a best-of-seven series (scores in the bracket indicate the number of games won in each best-of-seven series). The NHL used "re-seeding" instead of a fixed bracket playoff system. During the first three rounds, the highest remaining seed in each conference was matched against the lowest remaining seed, the second-highest remaining seed played the second-lowest remaining seed, and so forth. The higher-seeded team was awarded home-ice advantage. The two conference winners then advanced to the Stanley Cup Finals.

Conference quarterfinals	Conference semifinals
1	Quebec	2
8	NY Rangers	4
2	Philadelphia	4
8	NY Rangers	0
2	Philadelphia	4
7	Buffalo	1
Eastern Conference
3	Pittsburgh	4
6	Washington	3
3	Pittsburgh	1
5	New Jersey	4
4	Boston	1
5	New Jersey	4
1	Detroit	4
8	Dallas	1
1	Detroit	4
7	San Jose	0
2	Calgary	3
7	San Jose	4
Western Conference
3	St. Louis	3
6	Vancouver	4
4	Chicago	4
6	Vancouver	0
4	Chicago	4
5	Toronto	3

Conference finals
2	Philadelphia	2
5	New Jersey	4
1	Detroit	4
4	Chicago	1

Stanley Cup Finals
E5	New Jersey	4
W1	Detroit	0

== Awards ==
The NHL Awards presentation took place on July 6, 1995.

Presidents' Trophy:	Detroit Red Wings
Prince of Wales Trophy: (Eastern Conference playoff champion)	New Jersey Devils
Clarence S. Campbell Bowl: (Western Conference playoff champion)	Detroit Red Wings
Art Ross Trophy:	Jaromir Jagr, Pittsburgh Penguins
Bill Masterton Memorial Trophy:	Pat LaFontaine, Buffalo Sabres
Calder Memorial Trophy:	Peter Forsberg, Quebec Nordiques
Conn Smythe Trophy:	Claude Lemieux, New Jersey Devils
Frank J. Selke Trophy:	Ron Francis, Pittsburgh Penguins
Hart Memorial Trophy:	Eric Lindros, Philadelphia Flyers
Jack Adams Award:	Marc Crawford, Quebec Nordiques
James Norris Memorial Trophy:	Paul Coffey, Detroit Red Wings
King Clancy Memorial Trophy:	Joe Nieuwendyk, Calgary Flames
Lady Byng Memorial Trophy:	Ron Francis, Pittsburgh Penguins
Lester B. Pearson Award:	Eric Lindros, Philadelphia Flyers
NHL Plus-Minus Award:	Ron Francis, Pittsburgh Penguins
Vezina Trophy:	Dominik Hasek, Buffalo Sabres
William M. Jennings Trophy:	Ed Belfour, Chicago Blackhawks

=== All-Star teams ===
First team	Position	Second team
Dominik Hasek, Buffalo Sabres	G	Ed Belfour, Chicago Blackhawks
Paul Coffey, Detroit Red Wings	D	Ray Bourque, Boston Bruins
Chris Chelios, Chicago Blackhawks	D	Larry Murphy, Pittsburgh Penguins
Eric Lindros, Philadelphia Flyers	C	Alexei Zhamnov, Winnipeg Jets
Jaromir Jagr, Pittsburgh Penguins	RW	Theoren Fleury, Calgary Flames
John LeClair, Montreal/Philadelphia	LW	Keith Tkachuk, Winnipeg Jets

== Player statistics ==
=== Scoring leaders ===
Bold depicts leader in category

Regular season

Player	Team	GP	G	A	Pts
Jaromir Jagr	Pittsburgh	48	32	38	70
Eric Lindros	Philadelphia	46	29	41	70
Alexei Zhamnov	Winnipeg	48	30	35	65
Joe Sakic	Quebec	47	19	43	62
Ron Francis	Pittsburgh	44	11	48	59
Theoren Fleury	Calgary	47	29	29	58
Paul Coffey	Detroit	45	14	44	58
Mikael Renberg	Philadelphia	47	26	31	57
John LeClair	Montreal/ Philadelphia	46	26	28	54
Mark Messier	NY Rangers	46	14	39	53
Peter Bondra	Washington	47	34	9	43

Playoffs

Player	Team	GP	G	A	Pts
Sergei Fedorov	Detroit	17	7	17	24
Stephane Richer	New Jersey	19	6	15	21
Neal Broten	New Jersey	20	7	12	19
Ron Francis	Pittsburgh	12	6	13	19
Denis Savard	Chicago	16	7	11	18
Paul Coffey	Detroit	18	6	12	18
John MacLean	New Jersey	20	5	13	18
Claude Lemieux	New Jersey	20	13	3	16
Vyacheslav Kozlov	Detroit	18	9	7	16
Nicklas Lidstrom	Detroit	18	4	12	16

Note: GP = Games Played, G = Goals, A = Assists, Pts = Points

=== Leading goaltenders ===
Bold depicts leader in category Regular season

Player	Team	GP	MIN	GA	SO	GAA	SV%
Dominik Hasek	Buffalo	41	2416	85	5	2.11	.930
Jim Carey	Washington	28	1604	57	4	2.13	.913
Chris Osgood	Detroit	19	1087	41	1	2.26	.917
Ed Belfour	Chicago	42	2450	93	5	2.28	.906
Jocelyn Thibault	Quebec	18	898	35	1	2.34	.917
Dominic Roussel	Philadelphia	19	1075	42	1	2.34	.914
Glenn Healy	New York Rangers	17	888	35	1	2.36	.907
Blaine Lacher	Boston	35	1965	79	4	2.41	.902
Andy Moog	Dallas	31	1770	72	2	2.44	.915
Martin Brodeur	New Jersey	40	2184	89	3	2.45	.902
Patrick Roy	Montreal	43	2566	127	1	2.97	.906

== Milestones ==
=== Debuts ===
The following is a list of players of note who played their first NHL game in 1994–95, listed with their first team (asterisk(*) marks debut in playoffs):

- Paul Kariya, Mighty Ducks of Anaheim
- Cory Stillman, Calgary Flames
- Eric Daze, Chicago Blackhawks
- Jamie Langenbrunner, Dallas Stars
- Manny Fernandez, Dallas Stars
- Ryan Smyth, Edmonton Oilers
- Marek Malik, Hartford Whalers
- Craig Conroy, Montreal Canadiens
- Brian Rolston, New Jersey Devils
- Tommy Salo, New York Islanders
- Adam Deadmarsh, Quebec Nordiques
- Peter Forsberg, Quebec Nordiques
- Adrian Aucoin, Vancouver Canucks
- Jim Carey, Washington Capitals
- Sergei Gonchar, Washington Capitals
- Nikolai Khabibulin, Winnipeg Jets

=== Last games ===
The following is a list of players of note who played their last game in the NHL in 1994–95 (listed with their last team):

- Mats Naslund, Boston Bruins
- Craig Simpson, Buffalo Sabres
- Jim Peplinski, Calgary Flames
- Dirk Graham, Chicago Blackhawks
- Mark Howe, Detroit Red Wings
- Mike Krushelnyski, Detroit Red Wings
- Kent Nilsson, Edmonton Oilers (Last active player to have been a member of the Atlanta Flames)
- Gaetan Duchesne, Florida Panthers
- Steve Larmer, New York Rangers
- Peter Stastny, St. Louis Blues
- Gerard Gallant, Tampa Bay Lightning
- Dave Poulin, Washington Capitals
- Thomas Steen, Winnipeg Jets

== Coaches ==
=== Eastern Conference ===
Team	Coach	Comments
Boston Bruins	Brian Sutter	
Buffalo Sabres	John Muckler	
Florida Panthers	Roger Neilson	
Hartford Whalers	Paul Holmgren	
Montreal Canadiens	Jacques Demers	
New Jersey Devils	Jacques Lemaire	
New York Islanders	Lorne Henning	
New York Rangers	Colin Campbell	
Ottawa Senators	Rick Bowness	
Philadelphia Flyers	Terry Murray	
Pittsburgh Penguins	Eddie Johnston	
Quebec Nordiques	Marc Crawford	
Tampa Bay Lightning	Terry Crisp	
Washington Capitals	Jim Schoenfeld	

=== Western Conference ===
Team	Coach	Comments
Mighty Ducks of Anaheim	Ron Wilson	
Calgary Flames	Dave King	
Chicago Blackhawks	Darryl Sutter	
Dallas Stars	Bob Gainey	
Detroit Red Wings	Scotty Bowman	
Edmonton Oilers	George Burnett	Replaced midseason by Ron Low
Los Angeles Kings	Barry Melrose	Replaced midseason by Rogie Vachon
St. Louis Blues	Mike Keenan	
San Jose Sharks	Kevin Constantine	
Toronto Maple Leafs	Pat Burns	
Vancouver Canucks	Rick Ley	
Winnipeg Jets	John Paddock	Replaced midseason by Terry Simpson

== Broadcasting ==
=== Canada ===
This was the seventh season that the league's Canadian national broadcast rights were split between TSN and Hockey Night in Canada on CBC. This was the first season that HNIC had doubleheaders on every Saturday night of the regular season. TSN continued to televise regular season weeknight games, primarily on Mondays and Thursdays. Coverage of the Stanley Cup playoffs was primarily on CBC, with TSN airing first round all-U.S. series.

=== United States ===
This was the first season of the league's five-year U.S. national broadcast rights deals with Fox and ESPN. Fox's deal marked the NHL's first major American broadcast network agreement since the 1974–75 season. ESPN's original deal that began 1992–93 season was also restructured, as Fox replaced ESPN's brokered deal with its sister broadcast network ABC. Fox had the All-Star Game and weekly regional telecasts on the last five Sunday afternoons of the regular season, while ESPN and ESPN2 had weeknight games.

For playoff coverage, this was the first time that all Conference Finals and Stanley Cup Finals games were exclusive to Fox or ESPN. American regional sports networks could still carry their teams' first and second-round games, but they could no longer televise local coverage beyond those rounds. During the first two rounds, ESPN and ESPN2 televised selected games, while Fox had regional Sunday afternoon telecasts. Fox's Sunday telecasts continued into the Conference Finals, while ESPN had the rest of the Conference Finals games. The Stanley Cup Finals were also split between Fox and ESPN.

== See also ==
- List of Stanley Cup champions
- 1994 NHL entry draft
- 1994-95 NHL transactions
- 1994–95 NHL lockout
- NHL All-Rookie Team
- Lester Patrick Trophy
- 1994 in sports
- 1995 in sports
