= NHL salary cap =

Max amount that NHL teams can pay players

The NHL salary cap is the total amount of money that each National Hockey League (NHL) team is allowed to pay its players collectively. It is a "hard" salary cap, meaning there are no exemptions (and thus no luxury tax penalties are required). The current cap system was introduced in the 2005–06 season.

Like many professional sports leagues, the NHL has a salary cap to keep teams in larger markets (with more revenue) from signing all of the top players and extending their advantage over smaller-market franchises. A notable instance of this was when the Detroit Red Wings stockpiled expensive high-end performers for their Stanley Cup-winning 2001–02 season; the New York Rangers often also used a similar approach, offering massive contracts to marquee, veteran players.

The NHL owners' efforts to include a salary cap had contributed to the 1994–95 NHL lockout, which ended with other issues, but not a salary cap, being worked out between the NHL and the National Hockey League Players' Association (NHLPA). The NHL reintroduced the desire for a salary cap as one of its conditions during the next round of contract negotiations, resulting in the 2004–05 NHL lockout, which was resolved with an agreement including the terms and conditions of a salary cap. The terms of the salary cap have been refined in subsequent NHL Collective Bargaining Agreements.

Overall, the salary cap varies on a year-to-year basis, calculated as a percentage of the NHL's revenue from the previous season. The salary cap was introduced for the 2005-06 season, set at US$39 million per team. Over the next two seasons, the salary cap surpassed the $40 million threshold, then the $50 million threshold. Following those three consecutive thresholds, the salary cap would first surpass $60 million in the 2011–12 season, $70 million in 2015–16, and $80 million in 2019–20. With the impact on sports revenue associated with the COVID-19 pandemic in North America, there has been a "flat cap" of $81.5 million from the 2019–20 through the 2022–23 seasons.

A salary cap existed in the early days of the NHL. During the Great Depression, for example, the league was under financial pressure to lower its salary cap to $62,500 per team, and $7,000 per player, forcing some teams to trade away well paid star players in order to fit the cap.

== Pre-salary cap ==
Prior to the resolution of the 2004–05 lockout, the NHL was the only major North American professional sports league that had no luxury tax, very limited revenue sharing and no salary cap.

During the "Original Six" era through to the early years of the expansion era, the NHL's strict reserve clause negated the need for a salary cap. Player salaries first became an issue in the 1970s, after Alan Eagleson founded the National Hockey League Players' Association (NHLPA) in 1967, and the upstart World Hockey Association (WHA) began competing with the NHL for players in 1971. Not all NHL owners were willing to engage in a bidding war, in particular, Harold Ballard of the Toronto Maple Leafs spent as little as possible, making his team the most profitable. There was little financial incentive for Ballard to spend money on star players to improve the quality of the on-ice product and attract fans, as all Maple Leafs games were sold out regardless of how poorly the team played. The Maple Leafs, which had only ten losing seasons in their history before Ballard took control of the team in 1972, had 12 losing seasons up until his death in 1990.

The 1994–95 NHL lockout was fought over the issue of the salary cap. The 1994–95 season was only partially cancelled, with 48 games and the playoffs eventually being played.

Although at the time six NHL franchises were based in Canada, by the turn of the century, nearly all NHL salaries were being paid in United States dollars. This caused hardship among the small-market Canadian teams at the turn of the 21st century due to the weak Canadian dollar, as their revenues were in Canadian dollars. NHL Commissioner Gary Bettman successfully persuaded the American-based teams to donate towards a pool to mitigate the effect of the exchange rate.

== Salary cap ==
=== 2004–05 negotiations ===
The previous collective bargaining agreement had expired on September 15, 2004. The negotiations for the 2005–12 NHL Collective Bargaining Agreement revolved primarily around players' salaries. The league contended that its clubs spent about 75% of revenues on salaries, a percentage far higher than existed in other North American sports. NHL Commissioner Gary Bettman demanded "cost certainty" and presented the NHLPA with several concepts that the Players' Association considered nothing more than euphemisms for a salary cap, which it had vowed it would never accept.

A lockout ensued, leading to the cancellation of the entire 2004–05 season, the first time a major sports league in North America had lost an entire season to a labor dispute. The lockout was resolved when the NHLPA agreed to a hard salary cap based on league revenues, although the NHL reciprocated by implementing revenue sharing which would allow for a higher cap figure.

The NHL salary cap was formally titled the "Upper Limit of the Payroll Range" in the new collective bargaining agreement. For the 2005–06 season, the salary cap was set at US$39 million per team, with a maximum of US$7.8 million (20% of the team's cap) for a player. The practice of paying all players in U.S. dollars (that had already been adopted prior to the lockout) was made mandatory, to preclude the possibility of payrolls being taken over the USD-denominated cap by exchange rate fluctuations.

Revenues for the seven Canadian teams have all increased significantly since the lockout. Their cost structure has changed favourably as well, largely (but not entirely) due to the fact the Canadian dollar has risen in value significantly, reaching essential parity with its U.S. counterpart for much of 2010 (the Canadian dollar has traded between 93 and 100 U.S. cents throughout that year). As a result, league-wide revenues measured in U.S. dollars have been inflated accordingly and all seven Canadian teams pay into the current revenue sharing plan. Some U.S. teams are said to have been less able to cope with the unexpected increase in salaries and are believed to be losing money. League owners have said that the current revenue sharing plan is designed to provide some protection to small market teams on either side of the border from the effects of future changes in the Canadian dollar's value.

As a result of these factors, the cap has been raised each year to the figure of $59.4 million for the 2010–11 season, with a cap of $11.88 million for a player.

The collective bargaining agreement also contains a "Lower Limit of the Payroll Range", which is the minimum that each team must pay in player salaries. The lower limit was originally set at 55% of the cap, but is now defined to be US$16 million below the cap; therefore the 2011–12 minimum is US$48.3 million. The difference between the salary cap and a team's actual payroll is referred to as the team's "payroll room" or "cap room". Each year of an NHL player contract, the salary earned contributes to the team's "cap hit". The basic cap hit of a contract for each year it is effective is the total money a player will earn in regular salary over the life of the contract divided by the number of years it is effective. This prevents a team from paying a player different amounts each year in order to load his cap hit in years in which the team has more cap room. Teams still use this practice, however, for other reasons.

Notwithstanding the cap and the nominal value of the players' contracts, the collective bargaining agreement stipulates that a fixed percentage of total league revenues (currently 57%) is to be paid to the players each season. To ensure compliance with this provision a percentage of each player's salary is withheld in escrow until the season is over, at which time the funds are divided between the players and owners so as to balance the aggregate league payrolls to the agreed percentage. In the first season of the current collective bargaining agreement, revenues exceeded expectations to such a margin that players received the entire escrow back plus additional funds from the owners, however in subsequent seasons this has not been the case. For example, in the first quarter of the 2010–11 season, the escrow rate was 17%.

Performance bonuses count towards the cap, although there is a percentage that a team is allowed to go over the cap in order to pay bonuses. A team must still factor in possible bonus payments, however, which could go over that percentage. Salary for players sent to the minors, under most circumstances, do not count towards the cap while they are there. If a player has a legitimate long-term injury, his cap hit is still counted; however, the team is permitted to replace him with one or more players whose combined salary is equal to or less than that of the injured player, even if the additional players would put the team over the salary cap (if the team's cap room is larger than the injured player's cap hit, they may take on as much as their cap room); however, the injured player may not return to play until the team is again compliant with the original cap. All salaries still count towards the league-wide share of revenue that the players receive.

The NHL became the first of the major North American leagues to implement a hard cap while retaining "guaranteed player contracts". Guaranteed player contracts in the NHL differ from other sports, notably the National Football League, where teams may opt out of a contract by waiving or cutting a player. NHL teams may buy-out player's contracts, but must still pay a portion of the money still owed which is spread out over twice the remaining duration of the contract. Any player can be bought out for one-third of the remaining salary if younger than age 26 at the time of termination, or two-thirds if age 26 or older, over twice the length of the remainder of their contract. Trading cash for players or agreeing to pay a portion of a player's remaining salary after trading him was forbidden in the 2005 collective bargaining agreement in order to prevent wealthier teams from evading the restrictions of the cap (this provision was eased in the 2013 collective bargaining agreement; see Trades below). It is also prohibited to renegotiate a player's contract in any way. The only way to end a player's contract early is to buy it out, or have the player retire, and then only if the contract took effect prior to a player turning 35 (see the next paragraph).

The collective bargaining agreement also contains a 35-and-over rule. The rule states that if a player signs a multi-year deal when the player is 35 or older, starting in the second year of the contract, that amount will count towards the team's salary cap regardless of whether the player is on the active roster or not (unless the player is on long-term injured reserve); this provision remains in effect for the 2013 collective bargaining agreement. This is designed to keep teams from signing older players to lucrative front-loaded contracts, thus saving cap room, in which there is no expectation the player will actually play in the latter years.

A player who signs a contract at age 35 or older can be bought out as a compliance buyout, or, as a regular buyout. As a regular buyout, the team does not receive cap relief, instead they free a roster position and decrease the salary owed to the player.

Players, agents or employees found to have violated the cap face fines of US$250,000 – US$1 million and/or suspension. Teams found to have violated the cap face fines of up to US$5 million, cancellation of contracts, loss of draft picks, loss of points and/or forfeiture of game(s) determined to have been affected by the violation of the cap.

=== 2012–13 negotiations ===
A new, lower salary cap limit was negotiated for the collective bargaining agreement starting with the 2012–13 season. To transition to the new cap, each team had two amnesty buyout opportunities: after the 2012–13 season and after the 2013–14 season, to release a player (or specify a player already released) that is bought out in full, counting against the players' overall share in revenues, but not counting towards the team's salary cap. The contract also limits salary variance on contracts from year to year to no more than 35% and no year can be less than 50% of the highest year. This was done due to the increasing frequency of teams signing star NHL players signing front-loaded contracts with the intention of lowering the salary's annual average, and thus, lowering the cap hit. One notable incident of this involved Ilya Kovalchuk, who signed a 17-year deal with the New Jersey Devils in July 2010, prompting the NHL to nullify the contract. Other similar incidents have involved Chris Pronger, Roberto Luongo and Marian Hossa.

=== 2020–21 Memorandum of Understanding ===
Following the temporary shutdown of the League in 2020 due to COVID-19 pandemic, the NHL and NHLPA were forced to devise a "Return to Play" policy that would allow for the continuation of play outside of the previously agreed upon terms of operation. The parties used this time to discuss the collective bargaining agreement, which had been in effect since the end of the 2012–13 lockout, and was set to enter its penultimate season in 2020–21.

On July 10, 2020, the league reached an agreement to renew the CBA through the 2025–26 NHL season, including an increase of the minimum player salary to $750,000 from $700,000, increasing the maximum value of entry-level contracts, deferring 10% of player salaries for the 2020–21 season to cover costs associated with the pandemic (to be paid back over three seasons beginning in 2022–23), and doubling of the playoff bonus pool to $32 million, among other items.

As part of the new CBA, the salary cap will remain at $81.5 million for the 2020–21 NHL season. Future increases will occur incrementally until the league recovers from the financial impact of the pandemic.

== Waivers ==
Waivers are discussed in article 13 of the collective bargaining agreement. Unlike other professional leagues, waivers in the NHL do not always mean an unconditional release if a player clears waivers and elects free agency, unless the waivers requested were unconditional waivers. Most NHL players will need to clear waivers before they are assigned to a minor league team; exceptions are listed below. Clearing waivers means every other team in the NHL has the option to "claim" that player off of the "waiver wire", thus assuming his contract (and cap hit; this varies for re-entry waivers), and providing only minor monetary compensation to the originating team (unless the waivers requested were re-entry waivers); financial compensations are listed below. If a player clears waivers, the team has the right to either loan the player to a minor league affiliate which is generally a team in the American Hockey League (AHL), or the team can elect to keep that player with their club. Once a player has cleared waivers, they do not need to again clear them for the shorter of: (1) 30 cumulative days on the NHL roster; or (2) until they have played in ten NHL games. If a player refuses to report to the minors, the team can use that as grounds to suspend the player (i.e., not pay them).

=== Financial compensation ===
Compensation is paid internally between clubs and is not applied to the salary cap. All figures are in US dollars.

Years with a signed SPC	Waiver compensation for goaltenders	Waiver compensation for forwards and defensemen
2	$90,000	$67,500
3	$75,000	$56,250
4	$67,500	$41,250
5	$63,750	$26,250
6	$15,000	
7	$13,125	
8	$11,250	
9	$7,500	
10+	$3,375	
	Waiver compensation for goaltenders, forwards and defensemen on Unconditional Waivers	
$125

=== Exemptions ===
The following players can be assigned to the AHL (or for players on an entry-level contract, the ECHL) as many times as a team wishes without needing to clear waivers, until they have reached the number of NHL games played as indicated in the table below.

Age at which first NHL contract signed	Waiver exemption for goaltenders (whichever comes first)		Waiver exemption for forwards and defensemen (whichever comes first)	
Age at which first NHL contract signed	Years from signing first NHL contract	NHL games played (regular season and postseason)	Years from signing first NHL contract	NHL games played (regular season and postseason)
18	6*	80	5*	160
19	5*	80	4*	160
20	4	80	3	160
21	4	60	3	80
22	4	60	3	70
23	3	60	3	60
24	2	60	2	60
25 or older	1 (No games limit)		1 (No games limit)	
*For these players, the first NHL season is a season in which a player dresses for at least 11 NHL games. The exemption period is then reduced to three years for forwards and defensemen and four years for goalies.

Also exempt from waivers to demote a player are players who are recalled from the AHL or a Canadian Hockey League (CHL) team on an emergency basis. These players must be returned to their AHL or CHL team once the injured player returns, or converted to a regular recall, which can then subject the player to waivers if the service time in the table above is met. Starting with the 2013 collective bargaining agreement, for a player on emergency recall from the AHL, playing 10 or more NHL games while on emergency recall automatically converted the recall to a regular recall.

== Trades and salary retention ==
Prior to the reintroduction of the cap, it was fairly common (especially for wealthier teams) to include cash as part of a trade and/or retain some or most of a player's salary when trading him to another team. This was usually done when the club needed roster space for (an)other player(s) and could afford the extra costs. Under the terms of the 2005 collective bargaining agreement, when a team traded for another player, it assumed the full cap hit and remaining salary obligations of the acquired player. Including cash in a trade was also forbidden. That was partially changed for the 2013 collective bargaining agreement. Including cash in trades is still prohibited, but teams may retain part of a traded player's salary to ease the cap burden on the acquiring team. Provisions on such retention are as follows:

1. The acquiring team must assume at least 50 percent of the remaining salary and cap charge of the SPC.
2. Such a contract can only be traded twice using provision 1 during the lifetime of the SPC.
3. An SPC that has been retained on may not be retained on again within 75 regular season days of the first retention.
4. Retained salary by the trading team cannot be more than 15 percent of the upper salary cap limit.
5. A maximum of 3 such contracts with salary retained in a trade can be on a team's books at any one time.

This provision is included in Article 11 of Summary of Terms the 2013 Collective Bargaining Agreement Memorandum of Understanding. The restriction of the 75 day window was introduced in the 2025 memorandum of understanding.

== Free agency ==
There are several kinds of NHL free agency, but generally the free agent pool in the NHL is split into restricted and unrestricted free agents. All contract signings can be of up to seven years (eight if re-signing with their current club) as long as the averaged annual salary (plus bonuses) will fit under the team's salary cap, and the 50-contract limit is not exceeded.

=== Unrestricted free agency ===
On July 1 of a given year, the following players become unrestricted free agents, free to sign with any team without compensation to the former team.

1. Group 3 free agents: Players who have reached age 27, or have 7 accrued seasons of NHL experience, whose contracts have expired
2. Group 6 free agents (must be elected by the player): Players who have reached age 25, who have 3 accrued years of professional experience (that is, beyond junior or collegiate hockey), and whose contracts have expired, but have played less than:
  1. 80 NHL games played for forwards and defensemen.
  2. 28 NHL games played for goaltenders.
3. Players whose contracts have been bought out by their former team.
4. Players who do not meet either Group 3 or Group 6 requirements, but who have not been tendered a contract offer by the Monday after the NHL Entry Draft or June 25 (whichever is later). All other players are Group 2 restricted free agents. (See the next section.)

For purposes of the above, an accrued season is defined as a player having been on the team's active roster for 40 NHL games (30 in the case of a goaltender), including games missed where the player was injured.

The current NHL collective bargaining agreement also had a Group 5 unrestricted free agency category, but when the age for unrestricted free agents dropped to age 28 after the 2006–07 season, it became moot, as such players would become Group 3 free agents.

Under the 2013 Collective Bargaining Agreement Memorandum of Understanding, teams are allowed to interview players from other teams, but cannot discuss contract terms, following the NHL entry draft until July 1.

=== Restricted free agency ===
All players whose contracts have expired, but who do not qualify as Group 3 or Group 6 free agents become restricted free agents (Group 2) on July 1 of a calendar year, provided that a team has tendered a qualifying offer by June 25 or the first Monday after the NHL Entry Draft, whichever is later. A qualifying offer is a single year contract offer that is either the same amount as the previous year, or a slight raise, according to the previous year's amount, and must be for the following amount as listed in the table below. For purposes of the table, a one-way qualifying offer is an offer that pays the player the same salary if assigned to the NHL or to the AHL, as opposed to a two-way contract, which has a higher NHL salary than an AHL (or for entry-level contracts, an ECHL) salary.

Previous year's salary was:	Qualifying offer must be at least:	And must be a one-way qualifying offer if:
$659,999.99 or less	10 percent increase in salary	A player has played (for goaltenders, dressed for) at least: 1. 180 NHL games (games missed for injury or illness count), AND; 2. 60 NHL games in the previous season (games missed for injury or illness do not count), AND; 3. Not cleared waivers during the previous season.
$660,000.00 to $999,999.99	5 percent increase in salary, but not more than $1 million	A player has played (for goaltenders, dressed for) at least: 1. 180 NHL games (games missed for injury or illness count), AND; 2. 60 NHL games in the previous season (games missed for injury or illness do not count), AND; 3. Not cleared waivers during the previous season.
$1 million or more	Zero percent increase in salary	A player has played (for goaltenders, dressed for) at least: 1. 180 NHL games (games missed for injury or illness count), AND; 2. 60 NHL games in the previous season (games missed for injury or illness do not count), AND; 3. Not cleared waivers during the previous season.
Note: For players who are on expiring contracts that were signed after July 10, 2020, the Qualifying Offer is limited to the lesser of the table above or 120% of their previous contract's average annual value (AAV).

Group 2 free agents that have received a qualifying offer can also be traded, even if contract terms have not been agreed upon. All qualifying offers expire on July 15.

==== Offer sheets ====
The "restricted" part of Group 2 free agency comes into play with the concept of an offer sheet. An offer sheet is a contract that a new team can offer a restricted free agent. If an offer sheet is signed by the player, the originating team has the option of matching that offer, or receiving compensation from the team in the form of draft picks. For the current collective bargaining agreement, the draft picks owed for signing a restricted free agent is as follows. A team must actually have those draft picks to be able to sign the player to an offer sheet, and cannot use draft picks acquired in trades to sign a restricted free agent (unless a team has reacquired its own draft pick in a trade); all draft picks must be available in the next immediate draft, unless multiple picks are owed in the same round, then the team can spread the number of picks over one extra year (for example, two first-round picks would need to be available within the next three years, while four first-round picks would need to be available within the next five years):

2005 Averaged Salary	2026 Averaged Salary	Draft Pick Compensation
$660,000 and below	$1,575,969 and below	No compensation
$660,001 to $1,000,000	$1,575,970 to $2,387,832	Third-round pick
$1,000,001 to $2,000,000	$2,387,833 to $4,775,666	Second-round pick
$2,000,001 to $3,000,000	$4,775,667 to $7,163,498	First- and third-round pick
$3,000,001 to $4,000,000	$7,163,499 to $9,551,332	First-, second-, and third-round pick
$4,000,001 to $5,000,000	$9,551,333 to $11,939,166	Two first-round picks, second-, and third-round pick
$5,000,001 and above	$11,939,167 and above	Four first-round picks

If an offer sheet is matched by the originating team, the player cannot be traded for one calendar year from the date the new contract is finalized. Additionally, starting with the 2013 collective bargaining agreement, the average annual value for purposes of draft pick compensation is determined by the lesser of the number of years of the deal or five. This provision was inserted into the collective bargaining agreement after defenceman Shea Weber signed a 14-year offer sheet after the 2011–12 season.

==== Salary arbitration ====
Some restricted free agents are eligible for salary arbitration, if the following conditions are met

1. For players signing their entry-level contract at age 18 or 19 (but who will not turn 20 in the same calendar year that the entry-level contract was signed), a season of professional experience is at least 10 NHL games played, and at least four such seasons must be accrued for arbitration eligibility.
2. For players signing their entry-level contract at age 20 (or who will turn 20 in the same year that the entry-level contract is signed), a season of professional experience is at least 10 professional (non-collegiate) games played, and at least four such seasons must be accrued for arbitration eligibility.
3. For players signing their entry-level contract at age 21 or older, arbitration eligibility comes at the expiration of a player's first contract.

A player can only be subjected to a team-elected arbitration one time in his career, while a player may elect arbitration as many times as possible, provided that a qualifying offer has been made. After a qualifying offer is made, an eligible player can elect to go through the arbitration process, where the team and the player each make an argument for a certain contract size. An independent arbiter hears the arguments and decides on a fair contract amount. If the player has elected arbitration, and the award is more than a specified threshold (determined by the League and based on the previous years league-wide salaries) a team has 48 hours to "walk away" from the arbitration award, making the player an unrestricted free agent. As of 2021, the threshold is set at $4,538,958 (from 2005–2012, the threshold was $1,042,173 and was 4,084,219 by 2017). If the team has elected arbitration, the arbitrator's award is binding regardless of the amount.

Starting with the 2013 collective bargaining agreement, if a player is subjected to team-elected arbitration, that player may still receive an offer sheet from another team until the close of business on July 5 (prior to 2013, a player subjected to team-elected arbitration could not receive an offer sheet). Additionally, any team-elected salary arbitration must be filed for within 48 hours of the conclusion of the Stanley Cup Finals.

== Contracts and contract limits ==
There are several parameters that each NHL team must consider when comprising a roster. A maximum of 20 players (18 skaters and 2 goaltenders) can dress for a game. Additional restrictions are as follows.

- During the NHL regular season, a team may have a maximum of 23 players on the active roster, except for the period from December 19 to December 27, during which no player may be assigned to the AHL or ECHL, and after the NHL trade deadline.
  - After the NHL trade deadline, an NHL team is limited to five non-emergency callups from their minor league affiliates until their AHL or ECHL affiliate's season has ended (that is, callups from the AHL or ECHL who are not replacing injured players). Additions to the NHL roster, however, can come from players on the reserve list (see below) who leave collegiate, major junior, or European hockey clubs to sign entry-level contracts. Examples of the latter include rookie defenseman Jack Johnson, who left Michigan late in the spring 2007 semester and jumped directly to the Los Angeles Kings for the end of the 2006–07 season; and rookie center Marcus Kruger, who was signed by the newly defending Stanley Cup champion Chicago Blackhawks off of its reserve list; Kruger signed his entry-level contract with the Blackhawks in the 2010 off-season but decided to spend one more season with Djurgårdens IF until eventually leaving following the conclusion of its season and was immediately dressed by Chicago at the end of the 2010–11 season where he made his NHL debut on 23 March 2011 in a 4–0 win over the Florida Panthers and played in seven games in the 2010–11 season along with all seven playoff games in the Blackhawks first round exit at the hands of the Presidents' Trophy-winning Vancouver Canucks.
  - Following the end of a team's AHL or ECHL affiliate's season, unlimited callups are allowed, provided that a player is signed to one of its 50 contract slots.
- A team must have at least 24 players, 3 of whom must be goaltenders, under contract at any given moment during the regular season.
- A team may not have more than 50 players under contract at any point during the season. This limit includes players on injured reserve or long-term injured reserve.
  - Exception: An 18- or 19-year-old player with remaining major junior eligibility, or a player who is drafted from a European team who is then selected in the CHL Import Draft, does not count toward the contract limit until he has played at least 11 NHL games, if the player is assigned to his major-junior team only.
- A team may not have more than 90 players on its reserve lists at any one time during a season. The reserve list includes players under contract, unsigned draft picks who have collegiate or major junior eligibility remaining, and all unsigned draft picks who have been drafted by a team within the last two league years. NHL teams retain exclusive rights to draft picks for two years after a player is drafted, or until NCAA or major junior eligibility has been exhausted.
- Players can only sign a contract for up to six years. If they re-sign with their current team, the maximum length is seven years which can result in possible sign-and-trade deals.

== Buy-outs ==
Guaranteed player contracts in the NHL differ from other leagues, notably the National Football League, where teams may opt out of the salary obligations of a contract by waiving or cutting a player. NHL teams may buy-out player's contracts, but must still pay a portion of the base salary still owed which along with the associated cap hit is spread out over twice the remaining duration of the contract. As further discussed below, buy-outs do not provide a club with either financial or cap relief from any signing bonuses still outstanding, if any. Any player can be bought out for one-third of the remaining base salary if younger than age 26 at the time of termination, or two-thirds if age 26 or older, over twice the length of the remainder of their contract.

A major part of the benefit derived from the buy-out comes from the fact it is paid out over twice the number of years remaining on the contract. Since NHL revenues and the salary cap have both steadily increased since 2005, bought-out contracts typically consume both a smaller portion of a team's revenues and a smaller portion of the cap compared to what would be the case if they were paid out over the original length of the contract.

Also, as is the case with "non-guaranteed" contracts in the NFL, NHL contracts can contain signing bonuses and like in the NFL, signing bonuses must be paid except if the player retires or in other exceptional circumstances. Currently, the only limitation to the proportion of compensation that can be paid as a signing bonus is that the base salary of all NHL contracts must be at least the league minimum. Otherwise, signing bonuses can be payable in any year of a contract's duration. Also, notably, because they are due on July 1 prior to the start of each season (or upon signing in the case of contracts signed after July 1) they must be paid even in the event of a lockout. Signing bonuses may also provide tax advantages to players, depending on the jurisdiction of their team and/or the jurisdiction of their off-season residence.

If a contract with signing bonus(es) is bought out, the remaining signing bonus(es) is/are still paid in full as they are due and their full cap hits are charged in the year(s) they are paid, with only the base salary being paid and charged against the cap at the reduced rate over an extended period of time. If a player retires, any remaining signing bonus(es) is/are no longer payable, although if the contract took effect after the player turned 35 the full cap hit of the contract will still be charged to the team.

Unless a team terminates a contract by mutual consent (which is rare) or attempts to terminate a contract for an alleged violation of the SPC (which is almost as rare, and when attempted invariably triggers a grievance from the NHLPA) then the only way to end a player's contract early is to buy it out, or have the player retire, and even then there will only be salary cap relief if the contract took effect prior to a player turning 35.

At the commencement of the two most recent CBA's, teams were also provided with a limited number of compliance buy-outs. Like regular buy-outs, this mechanism allowed clubs to pay up to two-thirds of remaining salary owed to a player, but unlike regular buy-outs contracts ended by a compliance buy-out did not count towards the cap. They were implemented to allow teams to be in compliance with the cap for the 2005-06 season, and again to allow teams to come under the reduced cap for the 2012-13 season.

== NHL salary cap history ==
Since the NHL salary cap was reintroduced following the ratification of the 2005 collective bargaining agreement, it has risen almost every year, with the exception of the 2012-2013 season, when the 2013 CBA was ratified. When it was introduced in 2005, the lower limit was $8 million under the adjusted midpoint, and the upper limit was $8 million above the adjusted midpoint. Since the 2013 CBA, the lower limit has been set at 85% of the midpoint, while the upper limit (i.e. the salary cap) is accordingly set at 115% of the midpoint. This has carried over to the most recent CBA.

Salary Cap

The lower limit for the 2025–26 season is set at $70.6 million per team.
The lower limit for the 2026–27 season will be set at $76.9 million per team.

== See also ==
- NHL Collective Bargaining Agreement
- Player salaries in the NHL
