= Payroll Room =

The "Payroll Room" is how much money in a National Hockey League (NHL) team's salary cap is left to acquire players, whether such players are signed as free agents or join the team via a trade or waivers. The term originated in 2005 with the NHL Collective Bargaining Agreement (CBA), which was negotiated following a season-long lockout. The new CBA includes a salary cap (formally titled the "Upper Limit" of the Payroll Range in the agreement). Payroll room is often called cap room in the media.

A team can increase its cap room if it trades high-salary players to other teams and gets lower-paid players in their place. A team cannot trade its cap room to another team or defer its cap room to subsequent seasons. Other practices once common in the NHL, such as exchanging cash for players or agreeing to pay a portion of a player's remaining salary after trading him, have been explicitly forbidden in the new CBA to try to prevent wealthier teams from evading the restrictions of the cap.
