= Salary cap =

Agreement that limits athlete salaries

In professional sports, a salary cap (or wage cap) is an agreement or rule that places a limit on the amount of money that a team can spend on players' salaries. It exists as a per-player limit or a total limit for the team's roster, or both. Several sports leagues have implemented salary caps (mostly closed leagues), using them to keep overall costs down, and also to maintain a competitive balance by restricting richer clubs from entrenching dominance by signing many more top players than their rivals. Salary caps can be a major issue in negotiations between league management and players' unions because they limit players' and teams' ability to negotiate higher salaries even if a team is operating at significant profits, and have been the focal point of several strikes by players and lockouts by owners and administrators.

== Adoption ==
Salary caps are used by the following major sports leagues around the world:

- North America
  - The National Basketball Association, National Football League, National Hockey League, Major League Soccer, Major League Rugby, North American Rugby League, Canadian Football League, National Lacrosse League, Women's National Basketball Association, National Women's Soccer League, Professional Women's Hockey League, and minor leagues in various sports.
  - The National Basketball Association uses a soft cap plus luxury tax system, while Major League Baseball has no salary cap and instead implements a luxury tax only (see below).
- United Kingdom:
  - In England, the top-level leagues in both rugby codes—the Gallagher Premiership in rugby union and the Super League in rugby league—have salary caps.
  - The four Welsh regional sides in the rugby union competition now known as the United Rugby Championship unilaterally adopted a salary cap effective with the 2012–13 season.
- Australia and New Zealand: Most major leagues operating in the two countries have salary cap provisions:
  - The Australian Football League (Australian rules football), which operates only in Australia. The AFL Women's league, operated by the (men's) AFL, is also capped.
  - The National Rugby League (rugby league), A-League Men (association football) and National Basketball League, each of which is based in Australia but has one team in New Zealand.
  - The countries' national netball leagues—Super Netball in Australia and the ANZ Premiership in New Zealand—are capped. The trans-Tasman predecessor to both leagues, the ANZ Championship, was also capped.
  - In rugby union, New Zealand's top domestic competition, the National Provincial Championship, is capped. In addition, the Australian teams in the Super Rugby competition operate under a unilaterally adopted cap. New Zealand's Super Rugby sides are not subject to a team cap, but are subject to caps and floors on individual player salaries. During the period in which Argentine, Japanese, and South African sides participated in Super Rugby, teams from those countries were not subject to caps, but South Africa did have caps and floors on individual player salaries. It is unknown at present what limits South African sides are subject to in the United Rugby Championship.
- Eurasia: The Kontinental Hockey League, based in Russia and also including teams in Belarus, China, and Kazakhstan, has operated with a salary cap since its creation in 2008.
- France: The country's top-level rugby union league, Top 14, instituted a salary cap effective with the 2010–11 season.
- Asia: The Chinese Super League in association football instituted a salary cap effective with its 2021 season.

Recently, several European association football leagues have also discussed introducing salary caps. The Union of European Football Associations introduced a set of Financial Fair Play Regulations in 2011, which limits football clubs' spending relative to their income.

== Benefits ==
In theory, there are two main benefits derived from salary caps – promotion of parity between teams, and control of costs.

Primarily, an effective salary cap prevents wealthy teams from certain destructive behaviors such as signing a multitude of high-paid star players to prevent their rivals from accessing these players, and ensuring victory through superior economic power. With an effective salary cap, each club has roughly the same economic power to attract players. This results in roughly equal playing talent in each team in the league, and in turn brings economic benefits to the league and to its individual teams.

Leagues work to ensure a degree of parity between teams so that games are appealing for fans and not a foregone conclusion. This is what American football fans are referring to when they say anyone can win or lose on any given Sunday.

Leagues with salary caps generally believe letting richer teams accumulate talent affects the quality of the sporting product they want to sell: if only one or a few teams can win consistently and challenge for the championship, many contests will be blowouts by the superior team, reducing the sport's attractiveness for fans at the stadium and television viewers. Television is an important revenue source for many leagues worldwide; the more evenly matched and exciting the contests, the more interesting the television product, and the higher the value of the television broadcast rights. An unbalanced league will also threaten its weaker teams' financial viability: fans of the weaker clubs will gravitate to other sports and leagues if their teams have no long-term hope of winning.

One notable example of this occurring was in the Union Association, a baseball league that operated in 1884. The Association was dominated by the St. Louis Maroons, whose owner, Henry Lucas, was also league president (an obvious conflict-of-interest situation which is now banned), and bought all the best players for his own franchise, leaving the Maroons to easily win the pennant with a record of 94–19 (.832 winning percentage), 21 games ahead of their nearest rivals. The league folded at the end of the season.

Another famous example is the All-America Football Conference, which operated between 1946 and 1949. Despite starring many top players and innovative coaches, the AAFC was dominated by one team, the Cleveland Browns, who lost only three games in four years and won every championship in the league's four-year existence, being unbeaten in 1948, and winning three of the championships in blowouts. This resulted in a consistent fall in attendance and heavy losses after the league's second season, for the Browns as well as their rivals, and the league folded at the end of 1949.

The need for parity is more pronounced in leagues that use the franchise system rather than the promotion and relegation system, which is used in European football. The structure of a promotion and relegation system means weaker teams struggle against the threat of relegation, adding importance and excitement to the matches of weaker teams. International club competitions such as the UEFA Champions League also means that the top clubs always have something to play for, even in the most unbalanced of national leagues.

However, as of the 2020s, empirical evidence increasingly pointed to the conclusion that promotion and relegation, standing alone, was insufficient to ensure adequate parity in any given game or the overall financial performance of a sport (as distinguished from individual players or teams). Most importantly, the failure of most association football leagues to adequately regulate individual player compensation had resulted in too many games ending in predictable blowouts, and thereby reduced the financial value of such games in terms of ticket sales and media rights. This explained why in the 2020s, association football leagues were collectively bringing in annually only about two times the revenue of the National Football League (the wealthiest sports league in the world), even though association football had eight times the number of fans worldwide as American football.

A salary cap can also help to control the costs of teams, and prevent situations in which a club will sign high-cost contracts for star players in order to reap the benefits of immediate popularity and success, only to later find themselves in financial difficulty because of these costs. Without caps, there is a risk that teams will overspend for immediate victory at the expense of long-term stability. Team owners who use the same risk-benefit analysis used in business may risk both the fortunes of their own team and the reputation and viability of the whole league. Sports fans often seek to support a team for life, not merely for the short term. If teams regularly go bankrupt or change markets as businesses do, fans may deem the whole sport unstable and lose interest, switching support to a more stable sport in which long-term stability is more likely.

== Hard cap, soft cap and salary floor ==
A salary cap can be defined as a hard cap or a soft cap.

A hard cap represents a maximum amount that may not be exceeded for any reason. Contracts which cause a team to violate a hard cap are subject to major sanctions, including the voiding of violating contracts, and the stripping of championships won while breaching salary cap rules, which happened to the Melbourne Storm in the NRL. Hard caps are designed so that penalties deter breaking the cap, but there are numerous examples of clubs who have occasionally or systematically cheated the cap.

A soft cap represents an amount which may be exceeded in limited circumstances, but otherwise exceeding the cap will trigger a penalty which is known in advance. Typically these penalties are financial in nature; fines or a luxury tax are common penalties used by leagues.

A salary floor is a minimum amount that must be spent on the team as a whole, and this is separate from the minimum player salary that is agreed to by the league. Some leagues, such as the NHL, have a hard salary floor that requires teams to meet the salary floor every year, which helps prevent teams from using the salary cap to minimize costs. This also ensures that money from revenue sharing is used for player salaries instead of being pocketed by owners.

When the salary cap and floor are the same, the result is a standard form contract model of payment, in which each player is paid the same amount, sometimes varying by position. The standard form contract model is used extensively in North American minor leagues.

== Reserve clause ==
Before the implementation of salary caps, the economic influence of clubs on player markets was controlled by the reserve clause, which was long a standard clause in professional sports player contracts in the United States. The clause forbade a player from negotiations with another team without the permission of the team holding that player's rights even after the contract's term was completed. This system began to unravel in the 1970s due largely to the activism of players' unions, and the threat of anti-trust legal actions. St. Louis Cardinal star Curt Flood started the ball rolling when he refused a trade to the Philadelphia Phillies. He had been a player for 12 years and felt he should have a voice in where he played baseball. Even though he lost his case in the Supreme Court, he was the first baseball player to try to end the reserve clause. Although anti-trust actions were not a threat to baseball, which has long been exempt from anti-trust laws, that sport's reserve clause was struck down by a United States arbitrator as a violation of labor laws.

By the 1990s, most players with several years' professional experience became free agents upon the expiry of their contracts and were free to negotiate a new contract with their previous team or with any other team. This situation, called Restricted Free Agency, led to "bidding wars" for the best players—a situation which inherently gave an advantage in landing such players to more affluent teams in larger media markets.

== In North American leagues ==
=== National Football League ===
The new Collective Bargaining Agreement (CBA) formulated in 2011 had an initial salary cap of $120 million. While the previous CBA had a salary floor, the new CBA did not have one until 2013. Starting with that season, each team is required to spend a minimum of 88.8% of the cap in cash on player compensation, and 90% in future years. However, the floor is based on total cash spent over each of two four-year periods, the first running from 2013 to 2016 and the second from 2017 to 2020. A team can be under the floor in one or more seasons in a cycle without violating the CBA, as long as its total spending during the four-year period reaches the required percentage of the cap. This allows for unforeseen circumstances such as career ending injuries or unexpected player retirements to not result in an immediate penalty. As a result, teams are not forced to immediately take on a replacement for missing players which allows them to use more organic approaches such as a trade, free agency acquisition or the draft.

The NFL's cap is a hard cap that the teams have to stay under at all times, and the salary floor is also a hard floor. Penalties for violating or circumventing the cap regulations can include fines of up to $5 million for each violation, cancellation of contracts and loss of draft picks. Violating the salary floor regulations does not result in any fines or competitive penalties; instead, deficiencies are placed into a pool and distributed among all players who were on the regular roster of the offending team during a four-year floor cycle, prorated according to time on the roster in said period.

The cap was first introduced for the 1994 season and was expected to be $32 million, but an unexpectedly high bid from Fox and other networks increased the cap to $34.6 million. Both the cap and the floor are determined by a formula that is the league's revenue multiplied by the CBA percentage of the collective bargaining agreement to determine the player revenue share for the season. That value is then subtracted from the projected cost of player benefits for the season then divided by the total number of teams to determine the salary cap for a given season. Since its introduction the salary cap has increased each season (with the exception of the 2021 season due to a decrease of league revenues in the 2020 season due to the COVID-19 pandemic). In 2009, the final capped year under that agreement, the cap was $128 million per team, while the floor was 87.6% of the cap. Using the formula provided in the league's collective bargaining agreement, the floor in 2009 was $112.1 million. Under the NFL's agreement with the NFLPA, the effects on the salary cap of guaranteed payments such as signing bonuses are, with a few rare exceptions, prorated evenly over the term of the contract. During the offseason and preseason, only the top 51 salary figures are counted towards the cap. Once the 53-man rosters go into effect for the regular season the salaries of all players on the active roster, injured reserve, and practice squad, as well as unpaid bonuses and guarantees for former players count towards the cap.

In transitions, if a player retires, is traded, or is cut before June 1, all remaining bonus is applied to the salary cap for the current season. If the payroll change occurs after June 1, the current season's bonus proration is unchanged, and the next year's cap must absorb the entire remaining bonus. When a player is franchise tagged the salary cap will be affected. When the salary cap can't be met for a tagged player the National Football League will fund the remainder of the contract. Each team may only tag one player per year.

Because of this setup, NFL contracts almost always include the right to cut a player before the beginning of a season. If a player is cut, his salary for the remainder of his contract is neither paid nor counted against the salary cap for that team. A highly sought-after player signing a long-term contract will usually receive a signing bonus, thus providing him with financial security even if he is cut before the end of his contract.

Incentive bonuses require a team to pay a player additional money if he achieves a certain goal. For the purposes of the salary cap, bonuses are classified as either "likely to be earned", which requires the amount of the bonus to count against the team's salary cap, or "not likely to be earned", which is not counted. A team's salary cap is adjusted downward for NLTBE bonuses that were earned in the previous year but not counted against that year's cap. It is adjusted upward for LTBE bonuses that were not earned in the previous year but were counted against that year's cap.

One effect of the salary cap was the release of many higher-salaried veteran players to other teams once their production started to decline from the elite level. On the other hand, many teams have made a practice of using free agents to restock with better personnel more suited to the team. The salary cap prevented teams with superior finances from engaging in the formerly widespread practice of stocking as much talent on the roster as possible by placing younger players on reserve lists with false injuries while they develop into NFL-capable players. In this respect, the cap functions as a supplement to the 55-player roster limit (up from 53 since 2020) and practice squad limits (14 practice players by 2022 up from 10).

Generally, the practice of retaining veteran players who had contributed to the team in the past, but whose abilities have declined, became less common in the era of the salary cap. A veteran's minimum salary was required to be higher than a player with lesser experience, which means teams tended to favor cheaper, less experienced prospects with growth potential, with an aim to having a group of players who quickly develop into their prime while still being on cheaper contracts than their peers. To offset this tendency which pushed out veteran players, including those who became fan favorites, the players' association accepted an arrangement where a veteran player who receives no bonuses in his contract may be paid the veteran minimum of up to $810,000, while accounting for only $425,000 in salary-cap space (a 47.5% discount).

The salary cap also served to limit the rate of increase of the cost of operating a team. This has accrued to the owners' benefit, and while the initial cap of $34.6 million has increased to $123 million (maximum in 2009), this is due to large growths of revenue, including merchandising revenues and web enterprises, which ownership is sharing with players as well.

The owners opted out of the CBA in 2008, leading to an uncapped season in 2010. During the season, most NFL teams spent as if there was a cap in place anyway, with the league warning against teams front-loading contracts during the season. The Dallas Cowboys, New Orleans Saints, Oakland Raiders, and Washington Redskins chose to spend money in the spirit of an uncapped year, and in 2012 the Cowboys and Redskins (the top two NFL teams by revenue in 2011) were deducted $10 million and $36 million respectively from their salary caps, to be spread over the next two seasons. This $46 million was subsequently divided up among the remaining 28 NFL teams ($1.64 million each) as added cap space: this excluded the Raiders and Saints, as they were also over the cap, though to a lesser degree than the Cowboys and Redskins.

The actions of the league to punish those teams that were acting within their legal bounds during the uncapped year led to a lawsuit against them by the NFLPA. The case argued that the rest of the league colluded to keep average player salaries from rising in a year they expected them to skyrocket and unfairly punished teams that did not collude. The NFL settled the lawsuit with the NFLPA.

The impact of effective salary cap management on team success in the NFL

The salary cap is defined as a rule that places a limit on the amount of money a team can spend on players' salaries. Since its implementation, it has had a widespread impact on teams and organizations in the sports industry. It has changed how organizations invest in their players and the future as a whole. It has proven to be an obstacle in the pursuit of sustained success. Since 1994, The National Football League has only experienced a handful of repeat Super Bowl appearances. In one of his most prominent studies, James Carrey researched salary and performance data across the NFL over a 10-year period. Ultimately, his study showed that strategic management of player compensation directly resulted in an increase in wins.

Salary figures across the four major professional sports leagues in the United States can be compared. Doing so better enables one to understand the impact the cap has on a broader scale. Andrew Zimbalist argues that the data collected by revenue analysts across the respective leagues can be misinterpreted. This misinterpretation comes from the disparities in organizational structures across the leagues. In his study, Andrew Zimbalist collects compensation logistics for athletes. He subsequently relates it to overall revenue generated by a sports organization. The concept of adjusted data analytics is used in this study to compare the salary and revenue shares of the National Football League, National Hockey League, National Basketball Association, and Major League Baseball. In all, Zimbalist analyzes how salary caps have impacted controlling player costs. The study shows how the cap has affected the way organizations invest in and compensate their players.

There is a perceived sunk-cost assumption that has arisen from the NFL's salary cap. This assumption underlines an analytical approach on the topic. In one of his studies, Quinn Keefer ran a regression on the structure of the NFL draft. The regression relates playing time amongst players to the regulations that have come from the salary cap. It was concluded that there is a positive correlation between salary and games started. An increase in salary cap value results an increase in games started for the players who were selected in the first two rounds of the draft. Despite no acknowledgeable differences in productivity, the salary cap enables first round selections to receive compensation premiums and signing bonuses. These benefits result in those particular players starting more games than players who weren't selected early on in the draft.

The salary cap, and the regulations that are a part of it, come from the NFL collective bargaining agreement. This is an agreement between the league and its player association that discusses the sharing of revenue and other compensation rules. Quinn Keefer, in his analysis, primarily focusses on the section of the agreement regarding player compensation. He highlights that two major changes came from the 2011 collective bargaining agreement. One major change was rookie wage scale and how their selection in the draft notably affected their compensation and playing time. The second change was a limit placed on the first-year salary for players. Although these changes led to a higher first-year compensation for rookies-especially those selected in the first two rounds–they ultimately resulted in decreased salaries in the years after. Keefer concluded that there were diminishing returns. Overall, the 2011 collective bargaining agreement resulted in a negative effect on player salaries. This effect has led to a restructured management of rookie contracts over the last decade.

Salary dispersion and incentive pay affect team performance across the NFL. Mike Mondello and Joel Maxcy examine this effect through collecting data from the NFL between 2000 and 2007. Mondello and Maxcy performed regression analyses that used both fixed and random effects models. Their study was geared towards establishing a relationship between performance and payroll. A positive relationship between on-field performance and increased payroll was found. Mondello and Maxcy also found a relationship between on-field performance and salary dispersion. Team revenue production, analyzed as a means to measure team performance, was also used in this analysis. Mondello and Maxcy's findings suggest that incentive pay is effective when a pay structure differentiates players based on productivity and quality of performance. The findings in their study have implications that could expand across different sports leagues.

Player compensation across the NFL has been widely examined since 1994. Richard Borghesi analyzed the relationship between player compensation and franchise performance in the league between 1994 and 2004. The evidence gathered from these years shows that team success is dependent on both the actual and perceived fairness of player compensation. The data collected also shows that teams who implement the super-star approach to personnel decisions were worse on average when compared to teams who took a different approach. Borghesi shows how the most successful approach to player compensation and salary cap management is to concentrate on players' salaries on a group level. The super-star approach to player compensation leads to a lack of success on the field due to the dissatisfaction among players who recognize a substantial inequality in salaries.

Year	Maximum team salary
2024	$255.4 million
2023	$224.8 million
2022	$208.2 million
2021	$182.5 million
2020	$198.2 million + $40 million per team in player benefits
2019	$188.2 million
2018	$177.2 million
2017	$167.00 million
2016	$155.27 million
2015	$143.28 million
2014	$133 million
2013	$123 million
2012	$120.6 million
2011	$120 million
2010	Uncapped
2009	$123 million
2008	$116 million
2007	$109 million
2006	$102 million
2005	$85.5 million
2004	$80.582 million
2003	$75.007 million
2002	$71.101 million
2001	$67.405 million
2000	$62.172 million
1999	$57.288 million
1998	$52.388 million
1997	$41.454 million
1996	$40.753 million
1995	$37.1 million
1994	$34.608 million

Year by Year Salary Cap

=== National Hockey League ===
A salary cap existed in the early days of the National Hockey League (NHL). During the Great Depression, the league was under financial pressure to lower its salary cap to $62,500 per team and $7,000 per player, forcing some teams to trade away well-paid star players in order to fit the cap.

==== Pre-salary cap ====
Prior to the resolution of the 2004–05 lockout, the NHL was the only major North American professional sports league that had no luxury tax, very limited revenue sharing and no salary cap.

During the Original Six era through to the early years of the expansion era, the NHL's strict reserve clause negated the need for a salary cap.

Player salaries first became an issue in the 1970s, when Alan Eagleson founded the NHL Players' Association (NHLPA) and the upstart World Hockey Association began competing with the NHL for players. Not all NHL owners were willing to engage in a bidding war, in particular, Harold Ballard of the Toronto Maple Leafs spent as close to the league minimum on rosters as he could. Since Maple Leaf Gardens was consistently sold out no matter how poorly the Maple Leafs played, economically it made more sense for Ballard to spend the least amount of money he could, with his team being by far the most profitable.

The 1994–95 NHL lockout was fought over the issue of the salary cap. The 1994–95 season was only partially cancelled, with 48 games and the playoffs eventually being played.

Eight NHL franchises were based in Canada at the time of the lockout. Until the 1990s, the Canadian teams usually paid player salaries in Canadian dollars, but with the rise of free agency and a decline in the value of Canadian dollar, players and their agents increasingly demanded to be paid in U.S. dollars. Canadian teams' revenues were, then as now, mostly in Canadian dollars, and the effects of the discrepancy were particularly acute for the small market franchises. The financial difficulties and uncertainties of competing in smaller Canadian markets led to two clubs moving to the U.S.; the Quebec Nordiques to Denver, and the Winnipeg Jets to Phoenix. NHL Commissioner Gary Bettman successfully persuaded the US-based teams to donate towards a pool to mitigate the adverse effects of the exchange rate.

==== Negotiations ====
The negotiations for the 2004–05 NHL Collective Bargaining Agreement revolved primarily around players' salaries. The league contended that its clubs spent about 75% of revenues on salaries, a percentage far higher than existed in other North American sports; NHL Commissioner Gary Bettman demanded "cost certainty" and presented the NHLPA with several concepts that the Players' Association considered nothing more than euphemisms for a salary cap, which it had vowed it would never accept. The previous CBA had expired on September 15, 2004, and a lockout ensued, leading to the cancellation of the entire 2004–05 NHL season, the first time a major sports league in North America had lost an entire season to a labor dispute.

==== Current salary cap ====
The lockout was resolved when the NHLPA agreed to a hard salary cap based on league revenues, with the NHL implementing revenue sharing to allow for a higher cap figure. The NHL salary cap is formally titled the "Upper Limit of the Payroll Range" in the new CBA. For the 2005–06 NHL season, the salary cap was set at US$39 million per team, with a maximum of $7.8 million (20% of the team's cap) for a player. The CBA also mandated the payment of salaries in U.S. dollars, codifying what had been a universal practice for more than a decade.

Revenues for the six Canadian teams that were in the league at the time of the lockout have all increased significantly since then, and because the US dollar fell to relative parity with its Canadian counterpart in the early 2010s, league-wide revenues measured in U.S. dollars were inflated accordingly.

As a result of these factors, the cap was raised each year of the 2005–12 CBA to $64.3 million for the 2011–12 season, with a cap of $12.86 million for a player. The CBA also contains a salary floor which is formally titled the "Lower Limit of the Payroll Range", the minimum that each team must pay in player salaries. The lower limit was originally set at 55% of the cap, but is now defined to be $16 million below the cap, therefore the 2011–12 minimum was $48.3 million.

Since the current CBA was approved after a later lockout in 2012–13, league revenues have stagnated due to a significant fall in the value of the Canadian dollar against the U.S. dollar. The cap was $69 million for the 2014–15 season and will be $74 million for 2016–17.

The difference between the salary cap and a team's actual payroll is referred to as the team's "payroll room" or "cap room".

Each year of an NHL player contract, the salary earned contributes to the team's "cap hit". The basic cap hit of a contract for each year it is effective is the total money a player will earn in regular salary over the life of the contract divided by the number of years it is effective. This, in theory, prevents a team from paying a player different amounts each year in order to load his cap hit in years in which the team has more cap room. Teams still use this practice, however, for other reasons. Performance bonuses also count towards the cap, but there is a percentage a team is allowed to go over the cap in order to pay bonuses. A team must still factor in possible bonus payments, however, which could go over that percentage.

Salaries for players sent to the minors, under most circumstances, do not count towards the cap while they are there. If a player has a legitimate long-term injury, his cap hit is still counted; however, the team is permitted to replace him with one or more players whose combined salary is equal to (or less than) that of the injured player, even if the additional players would put the team over the salary cap. If the team's cap room is larger than the injured player's cap hit, they may take on as much as their cap room; however, the injured player may not return to play until the team is again compliant with the original cap.

The NHL has become the first of the major North American leagues to implement a hard cap while retaining guaranteed player contracts. Guaranteed player contracts in the NHL differ from other sports, notably the NFL, where teams may opt out of a contract by waiving or cutting a player. NHL teams may buy out players' contracts, but must still pay a portion of the money still owed which is spread out over twice the remaining duration of the contract. This does not apply for players over 35 at the time of signing; in this case a team cannot buy out the player's contract to reduce salary. Any other player can be bought out for 1/3 of the remaining salary if the player is younger than 28 at the time of termination, or 2/3 of the remaining salary if the player is 28 or older. Trading cash for players or paying a player's remaining salary after trading him have been banned outright in order to prevent wealthier teams from evading the restrictions of the cap.

Players, agents or employees found to have violated the cap face fines between $250,000 to $1 million or suspension. Teams found to have violated the cap can face fines of up to $5 million, cancellation of contracts, forfeiture of draft picks, deduction of points and forfeiture of games determined to have been affected by the violation of the cap.

=== National Basketball Association (soft cap + luxury tax) ===
The NBA had a salary cap in the mid-1940s, but it was abolished after only one season. The league continued to operate without such a cap until the 1984–85 season, when one was instituted in an attempt to level the playing field among all of the NBA's teams and ensure competitive balance for the Association in the future. Before the cap was reinstated, teams could spend whatever amount of money they wanted on players, but in the first season under the new cap, they were each limited to $3.6 million in total payroll. Under the 2005 CBA, salaries were capped at 57 percent of basketball-related income (BRI) and lasted for six years until June 30, 2011. The next CBA, which took effect in 2011–12, set the cap at 51.2 percent of BRI in 2011–12, with a 49-to-51 band in subsequent years. The salary cap for 2016–17 was set at $94.14 million, with the salary floor at 84.73 million and the luxury tax limit at $113.29 million. The current CBA took effect with the 2017–18 season.

The NBA uses a "soft" cap, meaning that teams were allowed to exceed the cap in order to retain the rights to a player who was already on the team. This provision was known as the "Larry Bird" exception, named after the former Boston Celtics great who was retained by that team until his retirement under the provisions of this rule. The purpose of this rule was to address fan unease over the frequent changing of teams by players under the free agency system, as fans became displeased over their favorite player on their favorite team suddenly bolting to another team. The "Larry Bird" provision of the salary cap gave the player's current team an advantage over other teams in free agent negotiations, thus increasing the chances that a player would stay with his current team. The provision tended to result in most teams being over the cap at any given time. Teams that violated the cap rules faced fines of up to $5 million, cancellation of contracts and loss of draft picks, and are prohibited from signing free agents for more than the league minimum. The NBA also has a salary floor, but teams are not penalized as long as their total payroll exceeds the floor at the end of the season.

The NBA also uses a "luxury tax" which is triggered if the average team payroll exceeds a certain amount higher than the cap. In this case, the teams with payrolls exceeding a certain threshold had to pay a tax to the league which is divided amongst the teams with lower payrolls. However, this penalty was levied against teams in violation only if the league average also breached a separate threshold.

The NBA implemented a maximum salary for individual players. This was done following a dramatic increase in player salaries, in spite of the salary cap, in the mid-1990s. Under the CBA, a player's maximum possible salary increased along with his time of service in the league. For a player of five years' experience, the maximum salary threshold began at 25% of the salary cap, with annual increases of up to 10.5% possible beyond that for players re-signed by their original team, or 8% annual increases for free agents that signed with new teams. For players of greater experience, the salary limit was higher – but the 10.5% limit on annual increases remained the same.

The 2011 CBA resulted in several major changes to the salary cap scheme. Most of these changes were retained in the 2017 CBA.

The cap remains a soft cap; the Bird exception remains in place, but teams have less financial room to retain a player with Bird rights than under pre-2011 agreements.

The 2011 CBA also reduced the maximum length of a contract by a year, and reduced allowable annual raises. Bird free agents are entitled to 5-year contracts with 7.5% raises; all other players (including sign-and-trade acquisitions) are limited to 4-year deals with 4.5% raises. Maximum salaries remain at 25, 30, or 35% of the cap, depending on years of service. These provisions remained intact in the 2017 CBA. Under the current CBA, a player coming off his rookie scale contract, who would normally be eligible to receive a salary of 25% of the cap, is eligible to receive 30% if he has been named MVP in any of the previous three seasons; named the Defensive Player of the Year in the immediately preceding season or two of the three most recent seasons; or named to an All-NBA team in the immediately preceding season or two of the three most recent seasons.

These criteria are the same that determine eligibility for a new type of contract introduced with the 2017 CBA—the Designated Veteran Player Extension (DVPE), popularly known as a "supermax" contract. Players entering their eighth or ninth season in the league who meet the aforementioned criteria may be eligible to sign an extension of up to 5 years at 35% of the cap, a salary normally allowed only for players with 10 or more years in the league. Such an extension can only be offered by the team that had the player under contract in the immediately preceding season. A team can use this extension on either a player under contract or its own free agent, but only if the signing team had originally drafted the player or obtained him in a trade during his rookie contract.

Substantial changes were made in 2011 to the luxury tax regime. The dollar-for-dollar tax provisions of the 2005 CBA remained in effect through the 2012–13 season. Starting in 2013–14, the tax changed to an incremental system. Tax is now assessed at different levels based on the amount that a team is over the tax threshold, which remains at a level above the actual cap. The scheme is not cumulative—each level of tax applies only to amounts over that level's threshold. For example, a team that is $8 million over the tax threshold pays $1.50 for each of its first $5 million over the tax threshold, and $1.75 per dollar for the remaining $3 million. In addition, "repeat offenders", subject to additional tax penalties, are defined as teams that paid tax in four of the five previous seasons. As in the previous CBA, the tax revenue is divided among teams with lower payrolls. However, under the new scheme, no more than 50% of the total tax revenue can go exclusively to teams that did not go over the cap; the use of the remaining 50% was not specified in the new agreement.

Amount over tax threshold	Standard tax per excess dollar	Repeat offender tax per excess dollar
$5 million or less	$1.50	$2.50
$5 million to $10 million	$1.75	$2.75
$10 million to $15 million	$2.50	$3.50
$15 million to $25 million	$3.25	$4.25
Each additional $5 million	$3.25 + $0.50 per $5 million	$4.25 + $0.50 per $5 million

Taxpaying teams have additional spending limits under the two most recent agreements (2011 and 2017). They have a smaller "midlevel exception" (another cap provision that allows teams to go over the cap to sign at least one player per season), and can acquire less salary in a trade. Also, since 2013–14, teams that exceed the tax threshold by the so-called "apron", an amount most recently set in the 2017 CBA at $6 million, cannot receive a player in a sign-and-trade deal.

The midlevel exception itself also changed with the 2011 CBA. The maximum duration of midlevel contracts was reduced from 5 years to 4 for non-taxpaying teams and 3 for taxpaying teams, and maximum allowable raises were also reduced. In addition, the midlevel exception was extended to teams under the salary cap for the first time; these teams received a 2-year exception. This exception was retained in the 2017 CBA.

Under the 2011 CBA, teams were allowed to "amnesty" one player before the start of any season, as long as his current contract was signed during the 2005 CBA. The amnestied player was waived from the team; although the player's former team remained obligated to pay his salary under the old contract (with a credit for any salary paid by a future team), that salary was no longer counted for purposes of the cap or luxury tax calculations. This provision could be used only once per team during the duration of the CBA, which was originally a 10-year deal but allowed either side to opt out in 2017. The "amnesty" provision was eliminated in the 2017 CBA, which was agreed to by the owners and players shortly before the opt-out date.

The salary floor, previously 75% of the cap, increased to 85% in 2011–12 and 2012–13, and 90% in future years.

=== Major League Baseball (luxury tax) ===
Instead of a salary cap, Major League Baseball implements a luxury tax (also called a competitive balance tax), an arrangement in which teams whose total payroll exceeds a certain figure (determined annually) are taxed on the excess amount in order to discourage large market teams from having a substantially higher payroll than the rest of the league. The tax was first instituted in 1997 and is paid to the league, which then puts the money into its industry-growth fund.

A team that goes over the luxury tax threshold for the first time in a five-year period pays a penalty of 22.5% of the amount they were over the threshold, second-time violators pay a 30% penalty, and teams that exceed the limit three or more times pay a 50% penalty from 2013 onwards. There is also an incentive to lower payroll; if in any year a team goes under the threshold, the penalty rate decreases to 17.5%, 25% or 40% (depending on prior record over the previous five years) for the next time the tax is paid.

The threshold for 2018 was $197 million, and rose to $206 million in 2019, $208 million in 2020, and $210 million in 2021.

The following teams have been subject to the luxury tax between 2003 and 2017:

Team	Years liable	Total tax paid
New York Yankees	2003–2017	$319.6 M
Los Angeles Dodgers	2013–2017	$149.7 M
Boston Red Sox	2004–2007, 2010–2011, 2015–2016	$25.1 M
Detroit Tigers	2008, 2016–2017	$9.0 M
San Francisco Giants	2015–2017	$8.8 M
Chicago Cubs	2016	$2.96 M
Washington Nationals	2017	$1.45 M
Los Angeles Angels	2004	$927,059

As of 2017, the New York Yankees have paid 61.75% of all luxury tax collected by MLB.

Money collected under the luxury tax is apportioned as follows: The first $2,375,400 and 50% of the remaining total are used to fund player benefits, 25% goes to the Industry Growth Fund, and the remaining 25% is used to defray team's funding obligations from player benefits.

==== Criticism ====
Measuring the success of the luxury tax in bringing the benefits of parity has brought mixed results. A team with a $100 million plus payroll won the World Series 12 times between 2004 and 2018 (the 2009 Yankees; the 2004, 2007, 2013 and 2018 Red Sox; the 2011 St. Louis Cardinals; the 2010, 2012 and 2014 Giants; the 2015 Kansas City Royals; the 2016 Cubs; and the 2017 Houston Astros). While a top tier payroll increases a team's chances of making the playoffs, it does not guarantee they will consistently win championships. On the other hand, the New York Yankees have consistently had the highest total payroll in MLB, and they have appeared in 40 of the 114 World Series for 27 wins as of 2018 (35.1% of all World Series for a 24.6% success rate). In the past 30 years, 18 different teams have won the World Series. In comparison, only 14 different teams won the NFL Super Bowl, 13 won the NHL Stanley Cup and 10 won the NBA championship in that same time frame.

Other pundits, such as Michael Lewis, the author of the bestseller Moneyball, have argued that using World Series championships as an example of parity may be misleading, and playoff appearances may be a better indicator of relative team strength. The playoff system used in baseball comprises a small number of games compared to success over a long season, and has been described as a "crapshoot" by Oakland Athletics general manager Billy Beane (the central figure of Moneyball). In fact, teams with consistently high payrolls, including the Yankees and Red Sox, have secured high numbers of playoff berths (the two teams have combined to win the American League East 19 out of 25 seasons from 1994 to 2018). In contrast, teams with low payrolls are far less likely to make the playoffs: for example, the Pittsburgh Pirates went 20 years without a winning season before making the 2013 playoffs.

A number of the small market teams, notably the Milwaukee Brewers, have called for the introduction of a salary cap, but any introduction has been opposed by the MLB players' union and the Yankees' ownership group; the latter have threatened legal action if such a cap is implemented.

Although some saw the success of NHL owners in their 2004–05 lockout as an opportunity for MLB to reform its collective bargaining agreement, baseball owners agreed to a new five-year deal in October 2006 that did not include a salary cap. Unlike the other three major North American sports, MLB also has no team salary floor: the only minimum limits for team payrolls are based on the minimum salaries for individual players of various levels of experience that are written into MLB's collective bargaining agreement. The players' union has also historically been vehemently opposed to a team salary floor, considering any floor proposal to be a prelude to a later request for a cap.

=== Major League Soccer ===
Here are some major points of the MLS rules and regulations for the 2017 season.

- A team's roster can be made up of up to 30 players. They are eligible to be selected to the 18-player team for each game.
- The salary cap is $4.035 million per team in 2018, not counting the extra salary of designated players. Players in the first 20 roster spots will count against the cap.
- Roster spots 19 and 20 are not required to be filled, and teams may spread their salary budget across only 18 players. A minimum salary budget charge ($67,500 in 2018) will be imputed against a team's salary budget for each unfilled senior roster spot below 18.
- The maximum salary for any non-designated player is $504,375.
- A designated player counts $504,375 against a team's cap. However, if a player joins his team in the middle of the season, the charge against the budget will be $252,187.
- Players who are in the roster spots from 21 to 30 will not count against a team's cap. They will be known as off-budget players.
  - Those in roster slots 21–24 must be a senior minimum salary player ($65,000 base salary – will increase to $67,500 in 2018) or Generation adidas player.
  - Those in slots 25–30 must be a reserve minimum salary player ($53,000 base salary – will increase to $54,500 in 2018). Additionally, those who earn the lowest possible league salary must be 24 or younger during the 2017 calendar year.
  - Those in slots 29–30 must also be homegrown players.
- In addition to the salary cap, each MLS team can also spend additional funds on a player in the form of allocation money and homegrown player subsidy.

Since the 2012 season, the cap number for designated players has depended on the players' ages. Since the 2013 season, players 20 or younger have counted $150,000 against the cap and those age 21 to 23 have counted $200,000, with older players remaining at the standard cap number ($368,750 for 2013, $387,500 for 2014, $436,250 for 2015, $457,500 for 2016, $480,625 for 2017, and $504,375 for 2018). For the purpose of determining a cap number, the player's age is determined solely by his year of birth.

=== Canadian Football League ===
On June 13, 2006, a proposed salary management system featuring a Maximum Salary Expenditure Cap (SEC) was ratified at the Canadian Football League board of governors meeting in Winnipeg, Manitoba. The CFL began enforcing strict salary cap regulation for the 2007 season and the cap was initially set at $4.05 million. The cap will be $6,062,365 for the 2025 season or an average salary of $131,791 per active roster player. However, most clubs spend more than the salary cap amount per season on salaries due to injury exemptions allowed under the cap. For instance, the Edmonton Eskimos spent $8.6 million on salaries in 2018, $8.8 million in 2017 season and $7.9 million in 2016, while still compliant with the then salary caps of between $5 million to $5.2 million.

Penalties for teams found to have breached the salary cap or salary floor regulations are:

Amount involved in breach	Penalty for each $1	Draft picks forfeited
First $100,000	$1	None
$100,000 to $300,000	$2	First Round
More than $300,000	$3	First and Second Round

The following breaches of the salary cap have occurred (no team has yet been penalized for violating salary floor regulations):

- In 2007, the Montreal Alouettes were fined $116,570 and forfeited a first-round draft pick after a CFL investigation found that they had exceeded the salary cap by $108,285 during the season.
- The Saskatchewan Roughriders were also fined in 2007 ($76,552) for a string of minor breaches in relation to benefit payments to injured players.
- In 2008, the Saskatchewan Roughriders were fined $87,147 for exceeding the salary cap by that amount.
- In 2009, the Winnipeg Blue Bombers were fined $44,687 for minor breaches in relation to player bonuses.
- In 2010, the Saskatchewan Roughriders were fined $26,677 for exceeding the salary cap by that amount.
- In 2013, the Saskatchewan Roughriders were fined $17,975 for exceeding the salary cap by that amount.

=== Major League Rugby ===
The current team salary cap in the Major League Rugby is $500,000.

=== Other North American leagues ===
Salary caps are common in other leagues.

The salary cap of the first Arena Football League was $1.82 million per team in its final season in 2008. In 2005, the Tampa Bay Storm were fined $125,000 for salary cap violations and their head coach Tim Marcum was suspended for four games (last two of the 2005 season and first two of the 2006 season) and fined $25,250; Marcum was suspended for a fifth game the next day for criticizing the decision at a press conference.

When the Arena Football League returned in 2010, it instituted a standard salary of $400 per game and a salary cap of $1.5 million, considerably lower than that paid by teams in the previous AFL; given that the new AFL had a 16-game season in 2010, this effectively means that its players are semi-professional.

The National Women's Soccer League, launched in 2013, was initially planned to have a team cap of $500,000, but that was later lowered to $200,000. However, the sport's three North American national federations—the United States Soccer Federation, which ran the league through the 2020 season; the Canadian Soccer Association (CSA); and the Mexican Football Federation (FMF)—committed to paying the league salaries of many national team players. For the league's first season, 23 US players, plus 16 players each from Canada and Mexico, had their salaries paid by their respective federations; these players' salaries originally did not count against the team cap. Mexican players have not been allocated since FMF launched Liga MX Femenil in 2017, but the CSA continued to allocate players to the league through the 2021 season, after which the national team allocation system was abolished.

For 2021, the NWSL team salary cap was $682,500, with a cap of $52,500 and a floor of $22,000 for individual player salaries. In a practice similar to that of MLS, "allocation money" can be used to supplement salaries of selected players. Although the salaries of U.S. and Canada national team players allocated to league rosters were paid by the USSF or CSA, these players remained subject to a modified form of the cap. U.S. federation players had a specified cap value of $33,000, with Canadian federation players having a cap value of $27,500 or their actual salary, whichever is lower. The national team allocation system was eliminated after the 2021 season. The league and its players' union entered into their first collective bargaining agreement during the 2021–22 offseason. For 2022, the team cap was raised to $1.1 million, with standard player salaries limited to between $35,000 and $75,000. However, in a system similar to that of MLS, each team is also entitled to use $500,000 per year in "allocation money" (which can be traded) to supplement the salaries of select players. For 2023, the team cap was further raised to $1.375 million, and allocation money increased to $600,000. Also, the maximum salary was redefined as a "maximum cap charge", which includes all team-provided compensation in the player's contract, excluding benefits provided to all league players. The maximum cap charge was set for 2023 at $200,000.

The cap does not include healthcare, which is funded fully by the team; housing, provided by the team either directly or via a stipend of up to $3,000 per month; or transportation, specifically by allowing teams to provide each player with a car with a maximum value of $50,000.

After the 2024 season, the league and its players' union entered into a new CBA that will run through the 2030 season. The new CBA has no individual salary caps, but retains the "maximum cap charge" concept and a team salary cap, with the team cap initially set at $3.3 million for the 2025 season and increasing annually to $5.1 million for 2030. Depending on league revenues, stated cap figures are subject to increase.

The Premier Hockey Federation, which had been the main women's professional ice hockey league in the US and Canada before it was shuttered in 2023 and effectively replaced by the Professional Women's Hockey League, had a team salary cap of US$750,000 and a floor of $562,500 in its 2022–23 season. This was a dramatic increase from the $300,000 cap in the 2021–22 season. In the PWHL's inaugural 2023–24 season (played entirely in calendar 2024), the team salary cap was US$1.265 million.

== In Europe ==
Salary caps are rarely used in Europe. However, several European rugby competitions, as well as ice hockey leagues, have successfully instituted salary caps. Rugby league's Super League, mainly in England with a team also in France (and formerly one in Wales), is capped. The league has used promotion and relegation for most of its history, though from 2009 through 2014 it operated on a licensing system with some similarities to the North American franchising model. Promotion and relegation returned to Super League in the 2015 season. In rugby union, two of the continent's three main domestic/regional leagues—the English Premiership and the French Top 14—instituted caps despite both being at the top of extensive pyramid structures with promotion and relegation throughout. The most notable European ice hockey league with a salary cap is the Kontinental Hockey League (which uses the franchising model), and that league implemented a cap despite currency issues.

=== Rugby union ===
==== English Premiership ====
The Premiership's salary cap has been in place since the late 1990s. By 2007–08, the cap reached £2.2 million. In the following season, it nearly doubled to £4 million, and remained at that amount through the 2011–12 season. A provision applicable only in seasons that run up against the quadrennial Rugby World Cup, such as 2015–16, gives teams a credit for each player in the squad participating in the competition, helping them to manage their reduced squads in the season's early weeks. This credit was £30,000 in the 2011–12 season, and rose to £35,000 for 2015–16. In addition, each club has a separate salary cap for its academy players (£200,000 prior to 2015–16, reduced to £100,000 thereafter, but with home-grown players no longer counting under this cap), and is allowed to provide an unlimited educational fund to enable its players to pursue university or vocational training. Finally, each club has a separate cap of £400,000 for use in signing replacements for players lost to long-term injuries (12 weeks or more).

Through 2011–12, the cap remained at £4 million. However, academy credits were introduced that season. Teams received a £30,000 credit for each home-grown player in their senior squads who was under age 24 at the start of the season and earned more than £30,000, with a maximum of eight such credits. This increased the effective cap to a maximum of £4.24 million (not counting World Cup roster credits).

Two substantial changes took effect for 2012–13. First, the cap increased to £4.26 million before academy credits and up to £4.5 million with credits. The most significant change was that each team could now sign one player whose salary did not count against the cap, similar to the Designated Player Rule in MLS. The player so designated, which the Premiership calls an "excluded player", had to meet one of the following three criteria:

- Played at least two full seasons with his current club before his designation.
- Played outside the Premiership in the season before his designation.
- Included in the official squad of any participant in the 2011 Rugby World Cup final tournament.

For the 2014–15 season, the cap increased to £4.76 million before academy credits and up to £5 million with credits. Other features of the cap remained unchanged.

Several significant changes were introduced for the 2015–16 season:

- The base cap increased to £5.1 million.
- The maximum possible number of academy credits per club remained at eight, but the per-player credit increased to £50,000. In turn, this means that the effective cap for a club that uses all of its academy credits was increased by £400,000 (instead of £240,000 in past seasons).
- Clubs may now have two excluded players instead of one. Unlike the first slot, which can be used for a player on a team's current roster, the new slot can only be filled by a player who had not been in the Premiership in the 12 months preceding the start of his initial contract with his Premiership club. A player's inclusion in, or exclusion from, a Rugby World Cup roster is no longer relevant to his status as an excluded player.

The cap later increased to a base of £6.5 million with maximum academy credits of £600,000 for the 2016–17 season, and is now at a base of £7 million with the same maximum for academy credits. Additionally, each team receives a credit of £80,000 for each member of the England national team on the roster, and a luxury tax (which the Premiership calls an "overrun tax") is imposed on clubs that exceed the salary cap by more than 5%. The base value of the cap will remain at £7 million through the end of the 2019–20 season.

==== French Top 14 ====
In December 2009, Ligue Nationale de Rugby (LNR), operator of the Top 14, announced it would impose a cap of €8 million, effective with the 2010–11 season. Previously, the only restrictions on team salaries were that wage bills were limited to 50% of turnover and that 10% of the salary budget had to be held in reserve. Along with the announcement of the cap, LNR also declared that the reserve requirement would be raised to 20%, with the previous limitation of 50% of turnover remaining in effect.

The new cap was slightly higher than the highest official wage bill in the 2009–10 season. Also, due to the complex nature of French club administration, clubs were seen as likely to find creative ways to skirt the cap. This was publicly admitted in 2014 by Mourad Boudjellal, owner of then-current Top 14 power Toulon. Boudjellal found a loophole that allowed him to set up a separate company to supplement the salary of star Jonny Wilkinson by a six-figure amount while staying under the cap.

The Top 14 salary cap was set at €9.5 million for 2012–13. For 2013–14, the cap was increased to €10 million, and in addition youth players are excluded from the cap unless their salaries are more than €50,000. The €10 million total cap remained in place for three seasons (through 2015–16); the agreement allowed for the threshold for exclusion of youth players to be adjusted before any of those seasons, but no such adjustment was made. The €10 million cap was later extended through the 2018–19 season. Additionally, each club that has a member of the France national team on its roster (more specifically, one of the 30 players named by the French Rugby Federation to the so-called "elite squad") is allowed to exceed the cap by a set amount per national team member. This amount was fixed at €100,000 through the 2015–16 season, and increased to €200,000 starting in 2016–17.

The cap rules were further tweaked for the 2015–16 season. Player bonus payments that amount to more than 10% of a player's salary are now counted against the cap.

==== Welsh rugby union ====
On 20 December 2011, the four Welsh regional sides that participate in the competition then known as Pro12, later as Pro14, and now as the United Rugby Championship announced that they would impose a salary cap of £3.5 million, effective with the 2012–13 season. The cap covers only the registered squad for European competitions—at the time of announcement, the Heineken Cup and European Challenge Cup, and from 2014 to 2015 the European Rugby Champions Cup and European Rugby Challenge Cup. It does not cover players in the regions' academies.

This cap was unilaterally instituted only on the Welsh teams. The URC is uncapped, and none of the other three European countries involved in the URC (Ireland, Italy, and Scotland) are known to have formally instituted such a system. South Africa maintains a cap and floor on individual player salaries but does not impose a separate team cap.

The operation of the cap was modified for select Wales national team players in 2014 by agreement between the Welsh Rugby Union and the Welsh professional players' trade union. This agreement introduced "National Dual Contracts", which make signatories available for all Wales national team matches regardless of whether they fall within an official World Rugby window for Test matches. The WRU funds 60% of the salary of NDC players, with the region covering the other 40%, with only the latter amount included in the salary cap.

=== Kontinental Hockey League ===
When the Russian Superleague was dissolved to make way to the modern-day KHL, the Kontinental Hockey League Players' Trade Union (KHLPTU) agreed to the implementation of a salary cap. When first implemented there was a salary cap, as well as a salary floor. For the 2009-10 KHL season, the salary cap was 620 million rubles ($US 18.3 million) and the salary floor was 200 million rubles ($US 5.9 million).

The KHL's cap operates despite the KHL's multinational nature, with teams in Belarus, China, Finland, Kazakhstan, and Latvia, in addition to its primary base of Russia. The five non-Russian countries use four different currencies (two countries use the euro), with most floating against the ruble.

From 2011 to 2012, each team can sign up to two "designated players" whose salaries are not counted against the cap. Up until 2011, the KHL salary cap was a soft cap, with a luxury tax amounting to 30% of the payroll that is over the cap paid to the special stabilization account, which helps KHL teams facing financial hardship. From the 2012–13 KHL season onward, the KHL began using a hard cap, set at 1.25 billion rubles (at the time $US 36.5 million). The 2020–21 season was the first which used a hard cap and a hard salary floor; in that season. the cap was 900 million rubles ($US 12.0 million at then-prevailing exchange rates) and the floor was 270 million rubles (roughly $US 3.5 million)

=== In European football ===
Several European association football leagues have considered introducing salary caps in the early 21st century. In 2002, the BBC reported that the G14 group of 18 leading European football teams would cap their payrolls at 70% of team's income, starting from the 2005/2006 season, however this did not occur. Serie A, the leading Italian football league, and the English Football League (consisting of England's second through fourth levels) have also considered salary caps.

These measures would be implemented to ensure clubs spend responsibly rather than as a tool to create parity. Top executives in European football have acknowledged that a number of challenges not present in North America would confront anyone who tried to implement an effective cap across European football or even across a single league with a view to creating competitive balance:

- The various national leagues are in competition with each other for the best players because there is free movement of players between the leagues. Football leagues in European Union countries have been forbidden from prohibiting the signing of EU players from other nations, or even from limiting their numbers. Therefore, if one league imposed a strict cap on its teams, the best players from the country in question would still be free to move to uncapped rival leagues.
- The existence of lucrative and prestigious international club competitions encourage clubs to ensure dominance of their national leagues in order to play in the higher-level European leagues. For many top clubs, the domestic league is little more than a stepping stone to the European league. Success in European club competitions is not only a matter of national pride, as the number of places allocated to each country for these competitions is determined by that country's teams' past performances in Europe. Salary capped clubs in a franchise structure do not have to compete with teams in rival leagues where there is no salary cap.
- Different governing bodies have authority over domestic and international competitions. For example, UEFA governs European football and organizes the prestigious Champions League, Europa League, and Conference League, but its authority over the domestic leagues is very limited. Although UEFA could, in theory, impose a salary cap, it would only apply to UEFA's club competitions and to the portion of each team's payroll paid to players registered with UEFA. A wealthy Champions League team could then sign players who would play exclusively in domestic competitions. In other sports that have a single governing body which oversees a single premier competition, the power to enforce salary cap rules is much greater.
- The pyramid structure of European leagues means the number of small clubs in the various lower divisions can run into the thousands. The promotion and relegation system which allows transfers between these divisions presents challenges to a cap system. A club that is relegated to a lower league after a poor season may find themselves significantly over the lower division cap. Similarly, a promoted club might have to face the challenge of hastily finding players who it could then pay under a higher cap. A salary cap exacerbates the problem of players switching clubs along with the clubs' movement between tiers.
- European tax systems and rates vary greatly from country to country. One prominent club, AS Monaco, plays in Monaco, a principality with no income tax at all. A flat payroll limit would therefore equate to aggregate take home pay that varied greatly from one club to the next, which would make it difficult for teams in countries with higher taxation to attract the best players. By comparison, the differences between the tax systems and tax rates of Canada, the US and between their respective provinces and states are not nearly as great.
- Europeans use multiple currencies and football wages are usually paid in the local currency. Although the countries hosting all but one of the most prominent European leagues now use the euro, the one exception, England, has the richest league. Even if a hypothetical UEFA-wide cap were denominated in Euros, fluctuating exchange rates would make it difficult for the cap to be fairly administered in the United Kingdom since its salaries are paid in pounds sterling. By comparison, most player salaries paid to players on Canadian major sports teams are paid in U.S. dollars; in fact this is now mandated in the NHL to ensure that payrolls do not fluctuate with exchange rates. On the other hand, prior to Brexit, trying to force British clubs to pay wages in Euros so that their payrolls could not exceed a cap would have met with opposition from clubs since their revenues are collected in pounds, and could have provoked political opposition from Britons determined to prevent the Euro from replacing the pound.

== In Australia and New Zealand ==
=== Australian rules football ===
The Australian Football League has implemented a salary cap on its clubs since 1987, when Brisbane and West Coast were admitted, as part of its equalization policy designed to neutralize the ability of the richest and most successful clubs, Carlton, Collingwood and Essendon, to perennially dominate the competition.

The cap was set at A$1.25 million for 1987–1989 as per VFL agreement, with the salary floor set at 90% of the cap or $1.125 million; the salary floor was increased to 92.5% of the cap in 2001, and to 95% of the cap for 2013 onwards due to increased revenues. The salary cap, known officially as Total Player Payments, is A$13,165,950 for the 2020 season with a salary floor of $12,507,652.50.

Both the salary cap and salary floor has increased substantially since the competition was re-branded as the AFL in 1990 to assist in stemming the dominance of other high membership clubs, such as Adelaide, Hawthorn and the West Coast Eagles.

Certain payments are excluded from the cap, and concessions are available for some players, in particular "veteran" players (those who have completed 10 seasons with their current club) and "nominated" rookie list players, who are discounted by 50% for purposes of the cap, depending on the number of these players at each club.

The AFL Players Association negotiates for players with the AFL on the topic of average salary.

==== Breaches ====
The breaches of the salary cap and salary floor regulations are exceeding the TPP, falling below the salary floor, not informing the AFL of payments, late or incorrect lodgement or loss of documents relating to player financial and contract details, or engaging in draft tampering. Trading cash for players and playing coaches, formerly common practices, are also prohibited to prevent wealthier clubs from circumventing the restrictions of the salary cap and salary floor.

Penalties for players, club officials or agents could include fines of up to one and a half times the amount involved and suspension. Penalties for clubs include fines of up to triple the amount involved, forfeiture of draft picks or deduction of premiership points. As of 2022, no club has been penalised for breaches of the salary floor regulations, and no punishment has included the deduction of premiership points.

==== Success of the cap ====
The VFL/AFL's salary cap has been quite successful in terms of parity: since the cap was introduced in 1987, 17 of the 18 teams have reached the Grand Final, and 14 teams have won the premiership.

Another major statistic in regards to the success of the VFL/AFL's cap is that the three richest and most successful clubs, Carlton, Collingwood and Essendon, who won 41 of the premierships between them from 75 Grand Finals in the 90 seasons between 1897 and 1986 (83.3% of all Grand Finals for a 45.6% premiership success rate), have only won six of the premierships between them from twelve Grand Finals since (32.4% of all Grand Finals for a 16.2% premiership success rate).

Of note in this regard is that the Sydney Swans, playing as South Melbourne until 1981, mostly struggled in the 50 seasons between 1946 and 1995, and made the finals on just four occasions in that time (a finals success rate of 8%). They had not won a premiership since 1933 and had not appeared in a Grand Final since 1945, but since 1996, have qualified for the finals in 23 of 27 seasons (a finals success rate of 83%) and played in six Grand Finals, winning the premiership in 2005 and 2012.

==== Football department cap ====
Originally, the cap was only for the Total Player Payments of each club and not the club's football department. This has caused concern in recent years; for instance, three of the four top-spending clubs played in the Preliminary Finals in 2012 and 2013, and the last team to win the premiership outside the top eight spending teams was North Melbourne in 1999.

There had been calls for a separate cap for the football department, or to reform the salary cap to include football department spending, but these had been opposed by the wealthier clubs, with Sydney CEO Andrew Ireland saying that the AFL needed to examine the gap between football department spending for these teams.

In 2014, the AFL and its clubs accepted a luxury tax on football department spending (excluding the salary cap) to take effect in 2015 and an overall revenue tax to take effect by 2017. Clubs that exceed the football department cap will pay the AFL the lesser of $1 million or 37.5% of the excess, and repeat offenders will pay the lesser of 75% of the excess or $2 million.

==== State and regional leagues ====
Apart from the AFL, several regional leagues also have salary caps which although widening between them and the AFL and overall less than national competitions, are substantial enough to dictate the movement of semi-professional and professional players between states and the overall playing quality and spectator attendance of the state leagues.

==== AFL Women's ====
In 2017, the AFL launched a semi-professional women's national league, known as AFL Women's: all of its teams are fielded by AFL clubs. The salary cap (Total Player Payments or TPP per club) rose from $474,800 in 2019 to $717,122 in 2023 with the total competition cap increasing more than 10 times in 6 years from $2.3 million in 2017 to $32.3 million in 2023.

=== Rugby league ===
The National Rugby League has a salary cap of A$9.6 million in 2018, with a salary floor of A$9.12 million (95% of the cap). The salary cap keeps average annual player salaries at around A$364,800.

The National Rugby League adopted a hard salary cap model in its first season in 1998. The NRL's stated purposes for having a salary cap are "to assist in spreading the playing talent" and "ensure that clubs are not put into positions where they are forced to spend more money than they can afford in terms of player payments, just to be competitive."

Before the 2012 season, the NRL's then Chief executive David Gallop said "The cap's there to make sure that pure purchasing power cannot dominate the sport... It means we can genuinely say that all 16 teams ... have a chance. For the fan every week, every game is a contest. That's at the core of why rugby league is so successful."

The breaches of the salary cap and salary floor regulations outlined by the NRL are exceeding the salary cap, falling below the salary floor, not informing the NRL of payments, late or incorrect lodgement or loss of documents relating to player financial and contract details or engaging in contract tampering. Trading cash for players is also prohibited to prevent wealthier clubs from evading the salary cap and salary floor regulations.

Penalties for players, club officials and agents could include fines of the one and a half times of the amount involved and suspension. Penalties for clubs could include fines of up to triple the amount involved ($10,000 for each document that is late or incorrectly lodged or lost) and deduction of premiership points.

The NRL is one of the few major leagues to implement a salary cap in a sport that has competing leagues in other countries where there is either no salary cap or a much higher cap per club. As a result, at times there has been a tradition of players from Australia moving to Europe where salaries for the elite, and even for average players, were considerably higher. This is often dependent on exchange rates or the rise and fall in the fortunes of international rugby league or union competitions.

The NRL chooses to continue with the cap, believing that any reduction in quality of the sporting product due to the loss of these players is less than allowing richer clubs to dominate. In practice, the goal of parity has been quite successful, with 12 different clubs winning the 19 premierships between 1998 and 2019.

However, since 2020 parity has been elusive. In 2024 the Penrith Panthers won their fourth title in a row, demonstrating that talented coaching and superior recruitment can still result in dynastic achievement in a salary cap environment.

=== Rugby union ===
==== Australia: Super Rugby ====
Through the 2017 southernhemisphere season, the five Australian teams then playing in rugby union's Super Rugby competition were subjected to an A$5 million salary cap for a squad of 30 full-time players per Australian team. The Australian Rugby Union, now known as Rugby Australia, decided in 2011 to introduce the salary cap because of financial pressures. Originally starting in 2012 as a cap of A$4.1 million, it was later raised to $4.5 million for the 2013 and 2014 seasons to take pressure off the teams' ability to recruit and retain players. The salary cap has been key component of negotiations between Rugby Australia and the Rugby Union Players' Association (RUPA) over the collective bargaining agreement. The fact that the Australian teams in Super Rugby face a salary cap has been attributed as a factor that makes it more difficult for Australian teams to win the title.

The cap regulations had some small concessions:

- Five players on each team could be paid $30,000 each per season by team sponsors; this amount was not included in the team cap.
- The maximum cap charge for a non-Australian player was $137,000, regardless of his actual wages.

Rugby Australia and RUPA later negotiated a new bargaining agreement, running from 2018 to 2020, that made significant changes to previous cap schemes. The 2018 season, coinciding with the transition from five Australian Super Rugby sides to four, was uncapped, but the salary cap returned for 2019 and 2020, at A$5.5 million. Prior concessions for sponsor payments and non-Australian players were removed, while a salary floor was added at 90% of the cap.

==== New Zealand: NPC ====
The 14 teams participating in New Zealand's top domestic competition, now known once again by its historic name of the National Provincial Championship, faced a salary cap in 2013 that was the lesser of $NZ 1.35 million or 36% of the union's commercial revenue. Maximum player salaries are $55,000, and minimum salaries are $18,000. In August 2013, it was announced that the cap would be further reduced, with the team cap for the 2015 season set to $1.025 million.

New Zealand first implemented the salary cap in the 2006 season. The purpose of the salary cap was to ensure an even spread of players to produce competitive matches and higher television audiences for the new, fully professional competition.

The salary cap had been as high as $2 million in 2008. However, the competition had generated losses of approximately $9.6m in 2007, and salary payments had increased by 75% in the previous four years. Some teams were reported to be in dire financial position, with four teams having payrolls of $1.75 million or more. The salary cap was cut in 2008, converting what was then known as the ITM Cup into a semi-professional competition, with players not under national team or Super Rugby contracts needing to find other part-time jobs.

=== Association football ===
==== A-League ====
Both national senior association football (soccer) competitions operating under the A-League banner, A-League Men and A-League Women, have salary caps.

A-League Men had a salary cap of A$2.5 million in the 2021–22 season, with the cap set to rise by $50,000 in each of the next two seasons. This value had reached $3.2 million in 2019–20, but was reduced to $2.1 million in 2020–21 due to financial fallout from COVID-19. However, the cap has numerous exceptions. First, then-current player contracts were honoured at their full values and not subjected to the cap. In the 2020–21 season, the league's two newest teams, Western United (which debuted in 2019–20) and Macarthur (which debuted in 2020–21), were allowed a higher cap of $2.433 million. The league also has a salary floor, set at 90% of the cap. The Salary Cap applies to the 20 to 23 Players that Clubs have registered to their A-League Men Player Roster. Unless specifically exempt, all payments and benefits (e.g. cars, accommodation, etc.) provided by a Club to a Player are included in the club's Salary Cap.

Each team can sign two "marquee players" and one "guest player", the latter of whom can only play for a maximum of 14 matches in a season, whose salaries are excluded from the team's salary cap. A-League Men has also introduced a "junior marquee" for eligible under-23-year-old players with the aim of keeping young talented players in Australia (or New Zealand for the Wellington Phoenix) for a longer period, similar to the Designated Player Rule in Major League Soccer in North America. Each team can also exclude the salaries of up to four "homegrown players", defined as under-23 players who have come from the club's youth system. Finally, once a player has been with a club for 4 consecutive years as a professional, he is considered a "loyalty player", and as long as he remains with that club, part of his salary is excluded from the cap. The percentage of exclusion starts at 12.5% in his fourth season with the club, increases to 25% in his fifth, and increases by 5% in each subsequent season until reaching its maximum value of 50% in his tenth season.

The breaches of the salary cap and salary floor regulations outlined by the A-League are exceeding the salary cap, falling below the salary floor, not informing the A-League of payments, late or incorrect lodgement or loss of documents relating to player financial and contract details or engaging in contract tampering.

Penalties for players, club officials or agents could include fines of up to one and one half times the amount involved and suspension. Penalties for clubs could include fines of up to triple the amount involved ($7,500 for each document that is late or incorrectly lodged or lost) and deduction of competition points.

In the 2006–07 season, Sydney FC were fined $174,000 and deducted three competition points after it was found that they had exceeded the salary cap by $110,000 and failed to declare third-party payments during the 2005–06 season in which they were premiers.

In 2014–15, Perth Glory were fined $269,000, deducted nine points and ruled ineligible to compete in the finals series after it was found that they had exceeded the salary cap by $400,000 during the season.

A-League Women had a cap of $450,000 and floor of $315,000 in the 2021–22 season. The floor is set to rise to $390,000 by 2025–26, with the cap level to be reviewed annually.

=== National Basketball League ===
The National Basketball League has a salary cap of A$1.1 million for each of its eight teams as of the 2016–17 season. In addition, from 2003–04 through 2015–16, the NBL used a "points cap" to encourage spread of talent: players were assigned points on a 1–10 basis each season "based on their performance in the NBL or based on the league they have participated in for the season just concluded", and each team's player roster (of between 10 and 12 players) had to fall within a "Total Team Points" limit.

On May 9, 2014, in order to help attract high-calibre imports or offer financial incentive for local stars considering overseas opportunities, the NBL introduced a marquee player rule. It originally allowed a team to nominate one player whose salary was paid outside the cap, with a 25% Marquee Player levy applied to any payment made above the salary cap. The levy still applies to non-local marquee players (i.e., players who are neither Australians nor New Zealanders), with one exception introduced in 2016–17.

Effective with the 2016–17 season, several significant changes were made to the cap scheme. First, the cap was changed from a hard cap of A$1 million to a soft cap of $1.1 million. Teams exceeding the cap are required to pay "salary equalisation" (effectively a luxury tax) equal to the amount above the cap. Additionally, players' values for purposes of the cap are not based on their publicised salaries, but are instead determined by an NBL panel. Also, the points system in place for the previous 13 seasons was scrapped; in its place, a salary cap provision was added requiring that all teams have at least one group of five players with a collective cap value of no more than A$400,000. Second, the Marquee Player rule was modified with regard to "non-restricted" players; the cap charge for a qualifying player who fills the marquee player slot is now $150,000, regardless of his actual salary. Since that season, "non-restricted" players have been defined as all Australians and New Zealanders, plus one player per team from another country that is a member of either FIBA Asia or FIBA Oceania.

The 2018–19 season saw another significant change to the cap scheme with the introduction of the NBL's "Next Stars" initiative, targeted mainly at young American players seeking an alternative to U.S. college basketball, plus Australians and New Zealanders considering U.S. college basketball. The league identifies young prospects preparing to graduate from secondary school and offers them NBL contracts at a first-year salary of A$100,000, plus housing and transport allowances. Players who sign "Next Stars" contracts are then allocated among the league's teams, with each team receiving an extra import roster slot intended to be filled by a "Next Star". As these slots are funded by the NBL, they do not count against the salary cap.

=== Netball ===
In netball's now-defunct ANZ Championship, which featured five teams each from Australia and New Zealand, each franchise was restricted to a NZ$380,000 salary cap (as of 2013) from which player salaries were paid. Salary amounts varied among players, but each player received a retainer of at least NZ$12,000 per season; high-profile players were expected to earn up to NZ$50,000.

Following the 2016 season, Australia's national governing body of Netball Australia broke away from the trans-Tasman championship and launched its own national league, Super Netball. The initial team salary cap in the new league was A$675,000, with minimum player salaries of A$27,375. This latter figure was more than double the minimum wage of A$13,250 in the final season of the ANZ Championship. New Zealand rebranded its now-domestic league as the ANZ Premiership, presumably retaining its prior salary cap provisions.

Since then, Super Netball's salary cap has risen modestly. The original team cap of A$675,000 had been structured with a $500,000 cap on playing payments, plus an additional $150,000 for club-related employment, educational, and ambassadorial roles, and the balance for health insurance and technology allowances. For the 2019 season, the minimum player wage (not including the health insurance allowance, set at $1,635 for that season) rises to $30,000, and the team cap on playing payments rises to $515,000.

== Chinese Super League ==
Following a 2020 season financially rocked by COVID-19, the Chinese Super League saw major turmoil. In February 2021 alone, the reigning champions Jiangsu F.C. folded; Shandong Taishan were expelled from the AFC Champions League for "overdue payables"; and Tianjin Jinmen Tiger were reportedly at risk of collapsing, with Chinese media reporting that the club had not paid players in 10 months. In 2020, then-current Super League member Tianjin Tianhai folded, as did Liaoning F.C., which had been the first Chinese club to win the AFC Champions League before dropping to the country's lower levels.

In December 2020, the Chinese Football Association imposed a salary cap on the Super League. Effective in 2021, total player wages are capped at RMB 600 million (US$91.7 million at March 2021 exchange rates), with a separate cap of €10 million (US$12.1 million) on total wages of foreign players. Individual player salaries are also capped at RMB 5 million (US$765,000) before tax for Chinese players and €3 million (US$3.63 million) for foreign players.

== In rugby union ==
Salary caps and currency conversions accurate as of July 2020.

Comparison of Salary Caps
Country	Competition	Cap (in euros)	Cap (local currency)	Cap Introduced	Exclusions from cap
France	Top 14	10.0m	10.0m (Note: Does not include €200,000 "bonus" per France national team member on the roster.)	2010–11	Youth players earning no more than €50,000
England	Premiership	8.7m	7.6m (Note: Maximum possible cap after academy credits. Base value of cap in local currency, before credits, is 7.0m. Does not include separate caps for academy players and injury replacements, credits for Rugby World Cup squad members in World Cup seasons, or £80,000 "bonus" per England national team member on the roster.)	1999–2000	Two players per club
Wales; Ireland; Italy; Scotland; South Africa	URC (Note: The other European countries in the URC – Ireland, Scotland, and Italy – do not impose a salary cap. South Africa, which joined the league in 2017–18, imposes a cap on individual player salaries, but does not impose a separate team cap.)	3.9m	3.5m	2012–13	Academy players Cap charge for National Dual Contract players is 40% of total salary
Australia; New Zealand	Super Rugby (Note: As of 2021, these are the only countries involved in Super Rugby; Argentina, Japan, and South Africa no longer participate in the league. New Zealand imposes a cap on individual player salaries, but does not impose a separate team cap. Two teams that draw players from Pacific Islands will join in 2022. One team will represent and draw its players from Fiji, but will be based in Australia for at least the 2022 season. The other, representing the Pacific islands as a whole, will be based in New Zealand.)	3.6m	5.5m (from 2019)	2011	None
New Zealand	NPC	0.6m	1.0m	2006	None
US; Canada	Major League Rugby		0.5m	2018	None

== In cricket ==
Salary caps and currency conversions accurate as of January 2018.

Comparison of Salary Caps
Country	Competition	Cap (in local currency)	Cap (adjusted to USD)	Cap Introduced	Exclusions from cap
Australia	Big Bash League	$1.86m	$1.37m	2011–2012	19th marquee player
Bangladesh	Bangladesh Premier League	৳125,182,771	$1.5m	2012	
India	Indian Premier League	₹90 Crore	$12m	2008	
West Indies	Caribbean Premier League	US$350,000	$350,000	2013	

== 2026 season ==
Competition	Sport	Country	Hard cap (US$)	Hard cap (original currency)	Soft cap (US$)	Soft cap (original currency)	Ref
National Football League	American football	United States	301.2 + $77.6 million per team in player benefits	-	-	-	
Major League Baseball	Baseball	United States; Canada	-	-	244 mil	-	
National Basketball Association	Basketball	United States; Canada	154.6m	-	139.2m	-	
National Hockey League	Ice hockey	United States; Canada	95.5m	-	70.6m	–	
Chinese Super League	Association football	China	91.7m	¥ 600m	-		
Top 14	Rugby union	France	-	-	12.7m	€11.0m	
Indian Premier League	Cricket	India	12.4m	₹ 800m	-	-	
Kontinental Hockey League	Ice hockey	Russia	12.0 m	₽ 900m	–	–	
Australian Football League	Australian football	Australia	-	-	9.7m	AU$12.45m	
Premiership Rugby	Rugby union	England	-	-	8.3m	£6.4m (Note: Credits of up to £600K for homegrown players, £400K to cover player absences on international duty, and £400K for long-term injured players are available, bringing maximum possible spending to £7.8m. Also, each team may designate one "marquee player" whose salary is not counted against the cap.)	
National Rugby League	Rugby league	Australia; New Zealand	7.4m	AU$9.4m	-	-	
Women's National Basketball Association	Basketball	United States; Canada	7.0m	-			
Major League Soccer	Association football	United States; Canada	-	-	6.4m + Designated Player Rule exception	-	
Canadian Football League	Canadian football	Canada	-	-	4.0m	CA$5.2m	
National Women's Soccer League	Association football	United States	3.7m + 1.0m exception for "High Impact Players" (Note: $3.5 million base amount plus $200,000 from revenue sharing. The "High Impact Players" rule allows teams to exceed the cap to sign players who meet designated high performance criteria.)	-			
Indian Super League	Association football	India	-	-	2.7m	₹ 175m	
Professional Women's Hockey League	Women's ice hockey	United States; Canada	1.34m				
Major League Rugby	Rugby union	United States; Canada	0.5m				
North American Rugby League	Rugby league	United States; Canada	0.3m				

== See also ==
- List of largest sports contracts
- Maximum wage
- Minimum wage
