= NHL Collective Bargaining Agreement =

NHL player/management agreement

The NHL Collective Bargaining Agreement (CBA) is the basic contract between the National Hockey League (NHL; 32 team owners and NHL commissioner) and the NHL Players' Association (NHLPA), designed to be arrived at through the typical labour–management negotiations of collective bargaining. On January 6, 2013, an agreement was tentatively reached after a labour dispute cancelled 510 regular season games of the 2012–13 season, and was ratified by the league's Board of Governors on January 9, 2013, as well as by the NHLPA membership three days later on January 12, 2013. As originally signed, the 2013 CBA was a 10-year deal, longest in NHL history, expiring after the 2021–22 season. On July 10, 2020, the NHL and NHLPA announced the extension of the CBA through the 2025–26 NHL season. On June 27, 2025, the CBA was extended again through the 2029–30 NHL season.

== History ==
=== 1994–1995 lockout ===
The previous agreement was signed in 1995 following a lockout which shortened the 1994–95 NHL season to 48 games, a loss of 34 games from what had originally been an 82-game schedule. None of the games scheduled for the 1994 segment of the season was ever played, the lockout lasting until after the beginning of 1995. The collective bargaining agreement was initially to last for six seasons and be open to re-negotiation in 1998, but was eventually extended to last until September 15, 2004 (one day after the World Cup of Hockey final in Toronto).

=== 2004–2005 lockout ===
On the expiration date of the old agreement, the NHL Board of Governors, representing ownership, met and unanimously decided that the 2004–05 NHL season would be delayed until a new collective bargaining agreement was in place. The owners' lockout of players began at 12:01 a.m. on September 16, 2004, the day most NHL training camps would have opened had the NHLPA and the NHL come to an agreement. By November 2004 it became apparent that the entire 2004–05 season was in jeopardy and supposedly "last-ditch" efforts were undertaken to avoid this, but little, if any, progress was seen during the last few months of 2004. The general consensus of many sportswriters and other knowledgeable observers was that, if the entire 2004–05 season were cancelled, the owners would attempt to open training camps in September 2005 for the 2005–06 NHL season using "replacement players," who are either not members of the NHLPA or were willing to resign their memberships.

On February 13, 2005, the U.S. Federal Mediation and Conciliation Service called a meeting between the two sides to negotiate a new deal. Three days later, NHL commissioner Gary Bettman officially cancelled the season. There was some hope that a season could have been salvaged, as hockey legends Wayne Gretzky and Mario Lemieux, both now part-owners of NHL teams, brought the owners and players together for talks on February 19. However, the two sides failed to reach an agreement.

Once the possibility of losing a second season to the dispute became real and the two sides realized that the dispute had alienated a large portion of the league's fan base, the league and the NHLPA resumed negotiations again in June 2005. Many pundits thought that the two sides wished to come to an agreement in early July, to coincide with the Canada Day (July 1) and United States Independence Day (July 4) holiday season. While July 4 passed without an agreement, momentum for a settlement was clearly building, with the two sides meeting daily between July 5 and July 13. Reportedly, the July 12 session lasted until 6 a.m. local time (1000 UTC) on July 13, at which time talks recessed for five hours. The sides announced a tentative agreement at 12:30 p.m. Eastern Time (1630 UTC) on the 13th.

The most important provision of the new collective bargaining agreement was an overall salary cap for all NHL teams, tied to league revenues. The agreement also phased in a reduced age for free agency, which would eventually give players unrestricted rights to negotiate with any team at age 27 or after 7 years of play in the NHL, whichever came first.

On September 4, 2010, the NHL and NHLPA ratified an agreement to alter how the salary cap hit of long-term contracts would be calculated. The new salary cap accounting system would see two distinct changes. First, long-term contracts remain valid, but contracts that include years when a player aged 40 or older will only have the portion of their salaries before they turn 40 included in cap hit calculation. Second, if the average value of the three highest seasons is $5.75 million or more, then the value of years 36 through 39 will have a minimum cap "charge" of $1 million.

These changes came shortly after Ilya Kovalchuk's contract extension with the New Jersey Devils was voided, due to "cap circumvention". Other long-term contracts, such as Marc Savard, Roberto Luongo and Marian Hossa, were grandfathered and their respective cap hits calculated under the old accounting system. However, any long-term contracts signed on or after September 5, 2010 would be subject to the new system.

=== 2012–2013 lockout ===
The 2005–12 CBA expired on September 15, 2012. The 2011–12 NHL season was the final year of the then-current collective bargaining agreement, as the NHL Players' Association would no longer have the option to extend the current CBA. The players' association could not move the expiration date to June 30 in order to avoid a repeat of the lockout that cancelled the 2004–05 season.

Just after 5 AM on January 6, 2013, after approximately 16 continuous hours of negotiating, a tentative deal was reached on a new collective bargaining agreement to end the lockout. It was ratified by the league's Board of Governors on January 9, as well as by the NHLPA membership three days later on January 12. The deal was also officially signed that day.

=== Present status ===
Originally, the 2013 CBA was on a ten–year deal, and would have expired on September 15, 2022. The NHL and NHLPA had a choice to opt out of the CBA on September 1 and September 16, 2019, but they chose not to. The NHL paused play in its 2019–20 season on March 12 due to the COVID-19 pandemic. On July 10, 2020, the NHL and NHLPA announced the extension of the CBA through the 2025–26 season. Various elements of the "Return to Play" plan were announced the same day.

=== Future ===
On June 27, 2025, the NHL and NHLPA agreed on a new four-year agreement that would begin for the 2026–27 season. The new agreement will see the regular season extended to 84 games from 82, a reduction of one year in the maximum length of a contract, the elimination of negotiated deferred salary, reductions in salary bonuses, a playoff salary cap system, and the relaxation of player dress codes.

== See also ==
- NHL salary cap
- List of player salaries in the NHL
