= List of highest-paid NHL players by season =

Here are several lists of National Hockey League players' salaries since the 1989–90 NHL season. This list does not include income from corporate endorsements or salaries before 1988–89.

== Top salaries in the NHL since 1989 ==
This is an unofficial list of the twenty NHL players who have earned the most in total salary from the 1989–90 through the 2023–24 seasons.

These figures have been gleaned from certain financial sites dedicated to professional sports, and so may not be perfectly accurate. This is merely an estimation that, for the most part, does not take into account bonuses nor sponsor contracts. They do not take into account inflation, nor the growth in the popularity of the game allowing league revenue, and thus player salaries, to grow faster than inflation over the decades. For example, the highest salary in 1989–90 was Mario Lemieux's US$2 million (equivalent to $4.9 million in 2025), while the salary cap for any single player in the 2024–25 season was $17.6 million.

These totals take into account players missing an entire season due to illness or injury, such as Jonathan Toews missing all of 2020–21 due to illness. These totals do not take into account reductions for partial seasons played, due to injuries or suspensions, for which a player would only receive a partial salary.

The list counts no salary for any player during the 2004–05 NHL lockout, when the 2004–05 season was cancelled in its entirety. It is not apparent, from the notes left here, if there has been an adjustment for the reduction in salaries paid when the 1994–95 NHL lockout shortened the 1994–95 season by 42.9% (48 games played of a scheduled 84), or when the 2012–13 NHL lockout shortened the 2012–13 season by 41.5% (48 games played of a scheduled 82), or when the COVID-19 pandemic shortened the 2019–20 season by varying amounts, with teams having played anywhere from 68 to 71 of their scheduled 82 games when the season was halted.

Key
†	Became a Stanley Cup champion during their playing career

Top 20 NHL salary-earners from 1989–90 to 2023–24
Rank	Player name	Salary (USD)	Total seasons (Note: Excludes the 2004–05 season, as the entire NHL schedule was cancelled that year.)	Years active
1	Sidney Crosby†	$141,340,243	19	2005–present
2	Alexander Ovechkin†	$138,220,892	19	2005–present
3	Shea Weber	$129,030,338	16	2005–2021
4	Jaromir Jagr†	$128,139,753	24	1990–2008; 2011–2018
5	Evgeni Malkin†	$126,720,892	18	2006–present
6	Anze Kopitar†	$120,454,878	18	2006–present
7	Vincent Lecavalier†	$116,266,608	17	1998–2016
8	Patrick Kane†	$115,637,195	17	2007–present
9	Jonathan Toews†	$115,562,195	13	2007–2023
10	Chris Pronger†	$111,379,268	18	1993–2012
11	Ryan Suter	$111,193,397	19	2005–present
12	Joe Thornton	$110,637,195	24	1997–present
13	Zach Parise	$110,243,397	19	2005–2024
14	Carey Price	$105,944,368	15	2007–2022
15	Brad Richards†	$105,567,467	15	2000–2016
16	Henrik Lundqvist	$102,783,390	15	2005–2020
17	Drew Doughty†	$99,929,878	16	2008–present
18	Steven Stamkos†	$99,551,829	16	2008–present
19	Zdeno Chara†	$99,538,695	24	1997–2022
20	Erik Karlsson	$99,346,046	15	2009–present

== Top five contracts by season ==
=== 1989–90 season ===
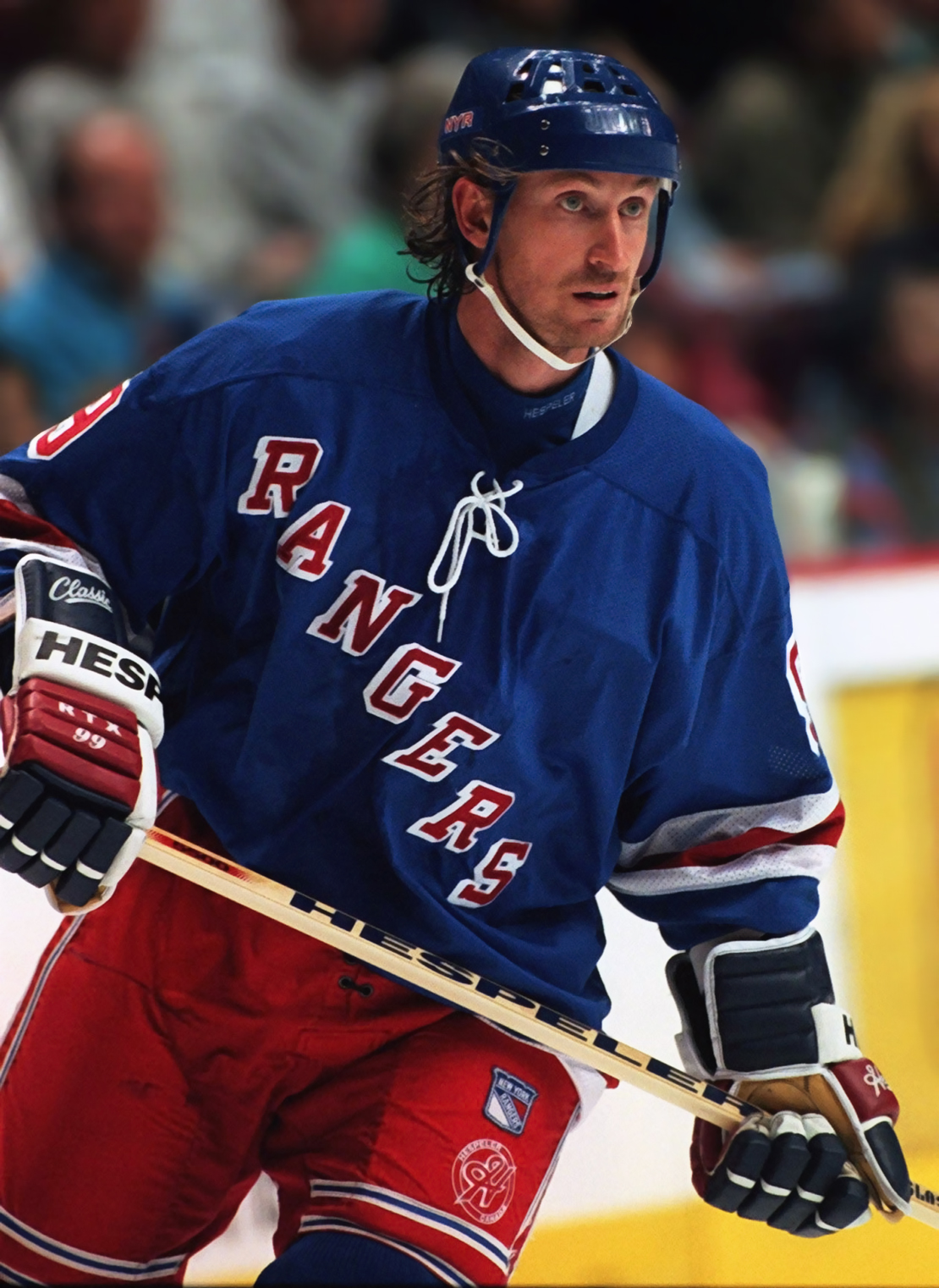
Although Wayne Gretzky is considered one of the greatest hockey players of all time, and his annual salary was in the top five for eight of his last ten seasons (including five seasons at No. 1), he retired before the end of the 20th century, so his total salaries have long ago fallen off the list of top 20 salary earners of all time.

1. Mario Lemieux (Pittsburgh Penguins) US$2 million (equivalent to $4.9 million in 2025)
2. Wayne Gretzky (Los Angeles Kings) $1.72 million ($4.2 million in 2025)
3. Mark Messier (Edmonton Oilers) $0.86 million ($2.1 million in 2025)
4. Steve Yzerman (Detroit Red Wings) $0.7 million ($1.7 million in 2025)
5. Bryan Trottier (New York Islanders) $0.575 million ($1.4 million in 2025)

=== 1990–91 season ===
1. Wayne Gretzky (Los Angeles Kings) $3 million
2. Mario Lemieux (Pittsburgh Penguins) $2.18 million
3. Steve Yzerman (Detroit Red Wings) $1.3 million
4. Ray Bourque (Boston Bruins) $1.19 million
5. Brett Hull (St. Louis Blues) $1.12 million

=== 1991–92 season ===
1. Wayne Gretzky (Los Angeles Kings) US$3 million (equivalent to $7.1 million in 2025)
2. Mario Lemieux (Pittsburgh Penguins) $2.34 million ($5.5 million in 2025)
3. Brett Hull (St. Louis Blues) $1.5 million ($3.5 million in 2025)
4. (tie) Pat LaFontaine (Buffalo Sabres) $1.4 million ($3.3 million in 2025)
  (tie) Steve Yzerman (Detroit Red Wings) $1.4 million ($3.3 million in 2025)

=== 1992–93 season ===
1. Eric Lindros (Philadelphia Flyers) US$3.5 million (equivalent to $7.8 million in 2025)
2. Wayne Gretzky (Los Angeles Kings) $3 million ($6.7 million in 2025)
3. Mario Lemieux (Pittsburgh Penguins) $2.41 million ($5.4 million in 2025)
4. Mark Messier (New York Rangers) $2.39 million ($5.3 million in 2025)
5. Pat LaFontaine (Buffalo Sabres) $1.78 million ($4.0 million in 2025)

=== 1993–94 season ===
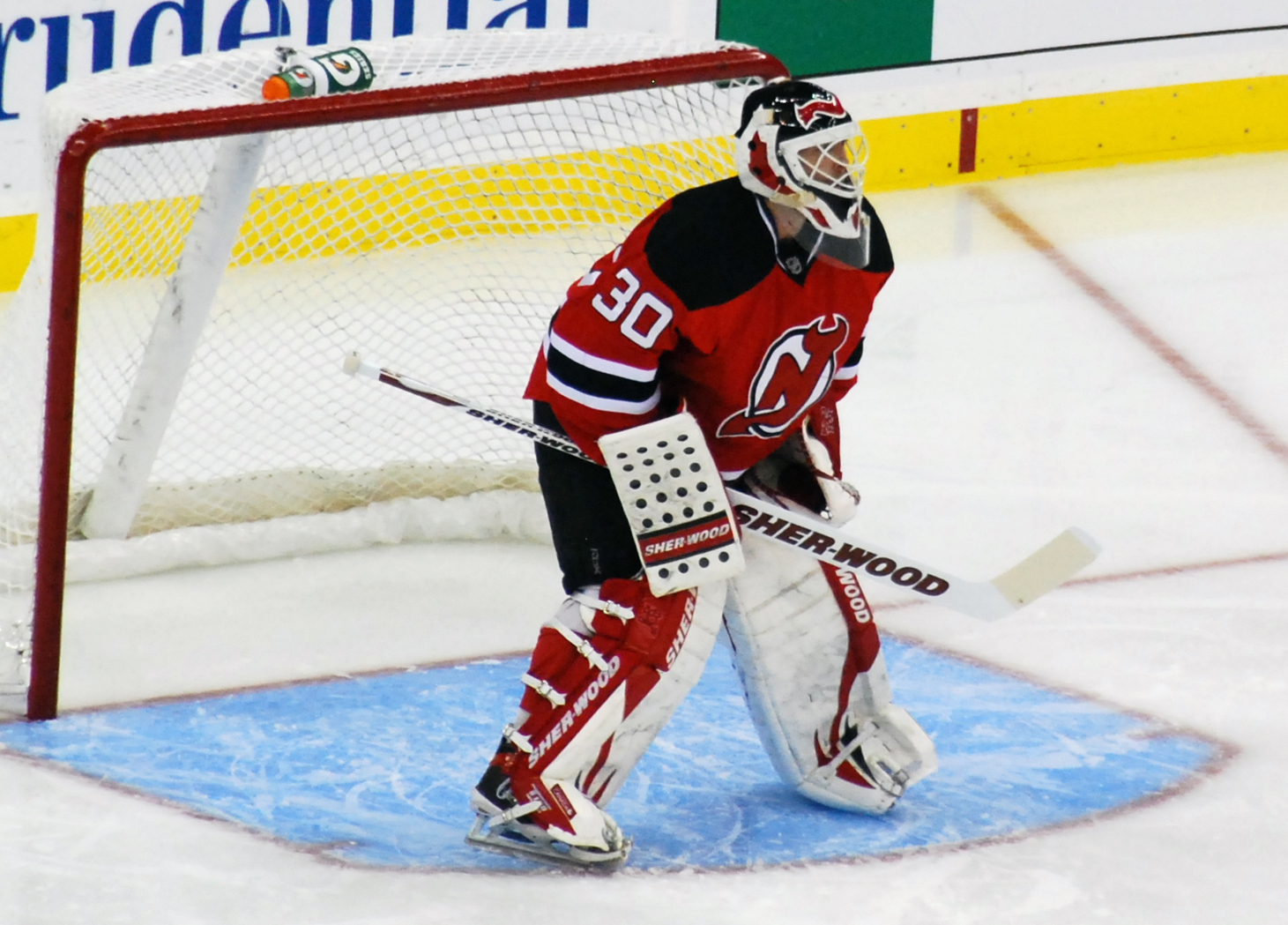
As of July 2014, Martin Brodeur was the highest-paid goaltender of all time, with approximately $82 million earned in salaries alone.

1. Eric Lindros (Philadelphia Flyers) US$3.35 million (equivalent to $7.3 million in 2025)
2. Steve Yzerman (Detroit Red Wings) $3.2 million ($7.0 million in 2025)
3. (tie) Mario Lemieux (Pittsburgh Penguins) $3 million ($6.5 million in 2025)
  (tie) Wayne Gretzky (Los Angeles Kings) $3 million ($6.5 million in 2025)
5. Patrick Roy (Montreal Canadiens) $2.66 million ($5.8 million in 2025)

=== 1994–95 season ===
After the 1994–95 NHL season was shortened to 48 games due to a lockout, players earned only about 56% of their predicted salary.

1. Wayne Gretzky (Los Angeles Kings) $3.66 million (Predicted salary of $6.54 million)
2. Mark Messier (New York Rangers) $3.45 million (Predicted salary of $6.29 million)
3. Scott Stevens (New Jersey Devils) $3.24 million (Predicted salary of $5.8 million)
4. Pavel Bure (Vancouver Canucks) $2.61 million (Predicted salary of $4.5 million)
5. Mario Lemieux (Pittsburgh Penguins) $2.36 million (Predicted salary of $4.07 million)

=== 1995–96 season ===
1. Wayne Gretzky (Los Angeles Kings/St. Louis Blues) $6.54 million
2. Mark Messier (New York Rangers) $6.29 million
3. Keith Tkachuk (Winnipeg Jets) $6 million
4. Mario Lemieux (Pittsburgh Penguins) $4.57 million
5. Pavel Bure (Vancouver Canucks) $4.5 million

=== 1996–97 season ===
1. Mario Lemieux (Pittsburgh Penguins) $11.35 million
2. Mark Messier (New York Rangers) $6 million
3. Pavel Bure (Vancouver Canucks) $5 million
4. Pat LaFontaine (Buffalo Sabres) $4.6 million
5. Patrick Roy (Colorado Avalanche) $4.57 million

=== 1997–98 season ===
1. Joe Sakic (Colorado Avalanche) $16.45 million
2. Chris Gratton (Philadelphia Flyers) $10.15 million
3. Wayne Gretzky (New York Rangers) $6.25 million
4. Mark Messier (New York Rangers) $6 million
5. Pavel Bure (Vancouver Canucks) $5.5 million

=== 1998–99 season ===
1. Sergei Fedorov (Detroit Red Wings) $14.5 million
2. Paul Kariya (Anaheim Ducks) $8.25 million
3. Eric Lindros (Philadelphia Flyers) $8 million
  Dominik Hasek (Buffalo Sabres) $8 million
5. Mats Sundin (Toronto Maple Leafs) $6.35 million

=== 1999–00 season ===
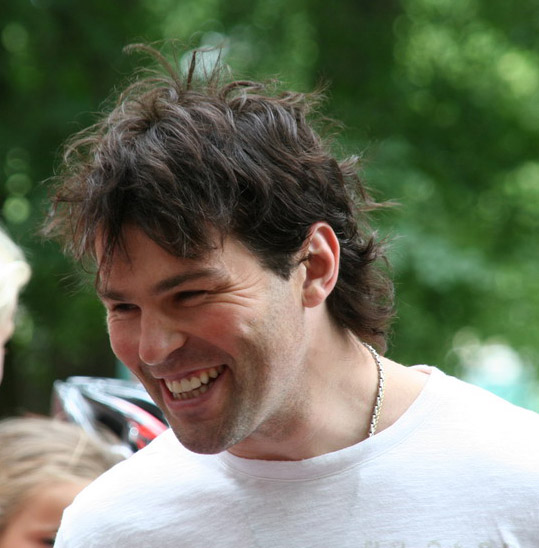
When Jaromir Jagr left the NHL for the Czech 1.liga at the end of the 2017–18 season, he had earned more in salary than any other NHL hockey player, with $128 million. As of completion of the 2023–24 season, he stands fourth on the all time list.

1. Jaromir Jagr (Pittsburgh Penguins) $11.7 million
2. Paul Kariya (Anaheim Ducks) $11 million
3. Peter Forsberg (Colorado Avalanche) $9 million
4. Theoren Fleury (New York Rangers) $8.5 million
  Eric Lindros (Philadelphia Flyers) $8.5 million

=== 2000–01 season ===
1. Peter Forsberg (Colorado Avalanche) $10 million
  Paul Kariya (Anaheim Ducks) $10 million
3. Jaromir Jagr (Pittsburgh Penguins) $9.8 million
4. Pavel Bure (Florida Panthers) $9 million
5. Keith Tkachuk (St. Louis Blues) $7.3 million

=== 2001–02 season ===
1. Jaromir Jagr (Washington Capitals) $11 million
2. Pavel Bure (Florida Panthers/New York Rangers) $10 million
  Paul Kariya (Anaheim Ducks) $10 million
4. Joe Sakic (Colorado Avalanche) $9.83 million
5. Chris Pronger (St. Louis Blues) $9.5 million
  Teemu Selanne (San Jose Sharks) $9.5 million

=== 2002–03 season ===
1. Jaromir Jagr (Washington Capitals) $11.48 million
2. Keith Tkachuk (St. Louis Blues) $11 million
3. Nicklas Lidstrom (Detroit Red Wings) $10.5 million
4. Pavel Bure (New York Rangers) $10 million
  Paul Kariya (Mighty Ducks of Anaheim) $10 million

=== 2003–04 season ===
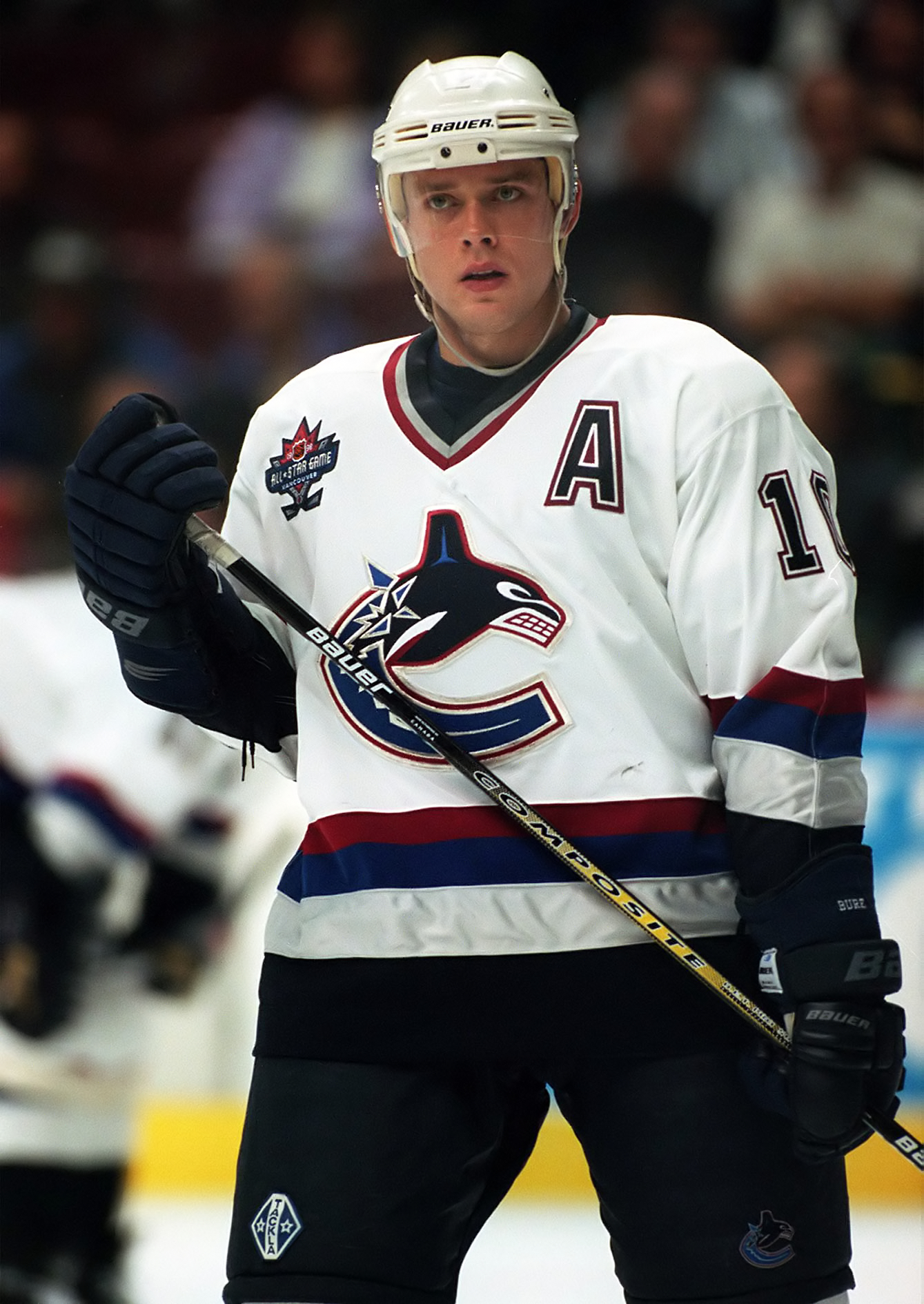
Pavel Bure amassed $56.37 million in his twelve-year career. He would have earned $10 million in 2003–04, but due to injuries, he was forced to retire early, having played his final game around the time of his 32nd birthday.

1. Peter Forsberg (Colorado Avalanche) $11 million
  Jaromir Jagr (Washington Capitals) $11 million
3. Sergei Fedorov (Mighty Ducks of Anaheim) $10 million
  Nicklas Lidstrom (Detroit Red Wings) $10 million
  Keith Tkachuk (St. Louis Blues) $10 million

=== 2004–05 season ===
Season cancelled (see 2004–05 NHL lockout).

=== 2005–06 season ===
The team salary cap was $39 million. Under the latest NHL Collective Bargaining Agreement, no player could earn more than 20 percent of the team salary cap ($7.8 million).

1. Jaromir Jagr (New York Rangers) $8.36 million
2. Nicklas Lidstrom (Detroit Red Wings) $7.6 million
  Keith Tkachuk (St. Louis Blues) $7.6 million
  Alexei Yashin (New York Islanders) $7.6 million
5. Jarome Iginla (Calgary Flames) $7 million

=== 2006–07 season ===
The team salary cap was $44 million. No player could earn more than $8.8 million.

1. Jaromir Jagr (New York Rangers) $8.36 million
2. Brad Richards (Tampa Bay Lightning) $7.8 million
3. Nicklas Lidstrom (Detroit Red Wings) $7.6 million
  Mats Sundin (Toronto Maple Leafs) $7.6 million
  Alexei Yashin (New York Islanders) $7.6 million

=== 2007–08 season ===
The team salary cap was $50.3 million. No player could earn more than $10.06 million.

1. Daniel Briere (Philadelphia Flyers) $10 million
  Scott Gomez (New York Rangers) $10 million
  Thomas Vanek (Buffalo Sabres) $10 million
4. Jaromir Jagr (New York Rangers) $8.36 million
5. Kimmo Timonen (Philadelphia Flyers) $8 million

=== 2008–09 season ===
The team salary cap was $56.7 million. No player could earn more than $11.34 million.

1. Dany Heatley (Ottawa Senators) $10 million
2. Sidney Crosby (Pittsburgh Penguins) $9 million
  Alexander Ovechkin (Washington Capitals) $9 million
4. Mats Sundin (Vancouver Canucks) $8.6 million
5. Miikka Kiprusoff (Calgary Flames) $8.5 million

=== 2009–10 season ===
The team salary cap was $56.8 million. No player could earn more than $11.36 million.

1. Vincent Lecavalier (Tampa Bay Lightning) $10 million
2. Sidney Crosby (Pittsburgh Penguins) $9 million
  Evgeni Malkin (Pittsburgh Penguins) $9 million
  Alexander Ovechkin (Washington Capitals) $9 million
5. Chris Drury (New York Rangers) $8.05 million

=== 2010–11 season ===
The team salary cap was $59.4 million. No player could earn more than $11.88 million.

1. Vincent Lecavalier (Tampa Bay Lightning) $10 million
  Roberto Luongo (Vancouver Canucks) $10 million
2. Sidney Crosby (Pittsburgh Penguins) $9 million
  Evgeni Malkin (Pittsburgh Penguins) $9 million
  Alexander Ovechkin (Washington Capitals) $9 million

=== 2011–12 season ===
The team salary cap was $64.3 million. No player could earn more than $12.86 million.

1. Brad Richards (New York Rangers) $12 million
2. Ilya Bryzgalov (Philadelphia Flyers) $10 million
  Christian Ehrhoff (Buffalo Sabres) $10 million
  Vincent Lecavalier (Tampa Bay Lightning) $10 million
3. Sidney Crosby (Pittsburgh Penguins) $9 million

=== 2012–13 season ===
The team salary cap was $70.2 million. No player could earn more than $14.04 million.

1. Shea Weber (Nashville Predators) $14 million
2. Tyler Myers (Buffalo Sabres) $12 million
  Zach Parise (Minnesota Wild) $12 million
  Brad Richards (New York Rangers) $12 million
  Ryan Suter (Minnesota Wild) $12 million

=== 2013–14 season ===
The team salary cap was $64.3 million. No player could earn more than $12.86 million.

1. Shea Weber (Nashville Predators) $14 million
2. Sidney Crosby (Pittsburgh Penguins) $12 million
  Zach Parise (Minnesota Wild) $12 million
  Ryan Suter (Minnesota Wild) $12 million
3. Eric Staal (Carolina Hurricanes) $9.25 million

=== 2014–15 season ===
The team salary cap was $69 million. No player could earn more than $13.8 million.

1. Shea Weber (Nashville Predators) $14 million
2. Sidney Crosby (Pittsburgh Penguins) $12 million
3. Henrik Lundqvist (New York Rangers) $11 million
  Zach Parise (Minnesota Wild) $11 million
  Ryan Suter (Minnesota Wild) $11 million

=== 2015–16 season ===
The team salary cap was $71.4 million. No player could earn more than $14.28 million.

1. Shea Weber (Nashville Predators) $14 million
2. Patrick Kane (Chicago Blackhawks) $13.8 million
  Jonathan Toews (Chicago Blackhawks) $13.8 million
3. Sidney Crosby (Pittsburgh Penguins) $12 million
4. Phil Kessel (Pittsburgh Penguins) $10 million

=== 2016–17 season ===
The team salary cap was $73 million. No player could earn more than $14.6 million.

1. Anze Kopitar (Los Angeles Kings) $14 million
2. Patrick Kane (Chicago Blackhawks) $13.8 million
  Jonathan Toews (Chicago Blackhawks) $13.8 million
3. Shea Weber (Montreal Canadiens) $12 million
4. Ryan O'Reilly (Buffalo Sabres) $11 million

=== 2017–18 season ===
The team salary cap was $75 million. No player could earn more than $15 million.

1. Patrick Kane (Chicago Blackhawks) $13.8 million
  Jonathan Toews (Chicago Blackhawks) $13.8 million
2. Jamie Benn (Dallas Stars) $13 million
  Anze Kopitar (Los Angeles Kings) $13 million
3. Shea Weber (Montreal Canadiens) $12 million

=== 2018–19 season ===
The team salary cap was $79.5 million. No player could earn more than $15.9 million.

1. John Tavares (Toronto Maple Leafs) $15.9 million
2. Connor McDavid (Edmonton Oilers) $15 million
  Carey Price (Montreal Canadiens) $15 million
3. Jamie Benn (Dallas Stars) $13 million
4. John Carlson (Washington Capitals) $12 million

=== 2019–20 season ===
The team salary cap was $81.5 million. No player could earn more than $16.3 million.

1. Mitch Marner (Toronto Maple Leafs) $16 million
2. Auston Matthews (Toronto Maple Leafs) $15.9 million
  John Tavares (Toronto Maple Leafs) $15.9 million
3. Connor McDavid (Edmonton Oilers) $15 million
  Carey Price (Montreal Canadiens) $15 million

=== 2020–21 season ===
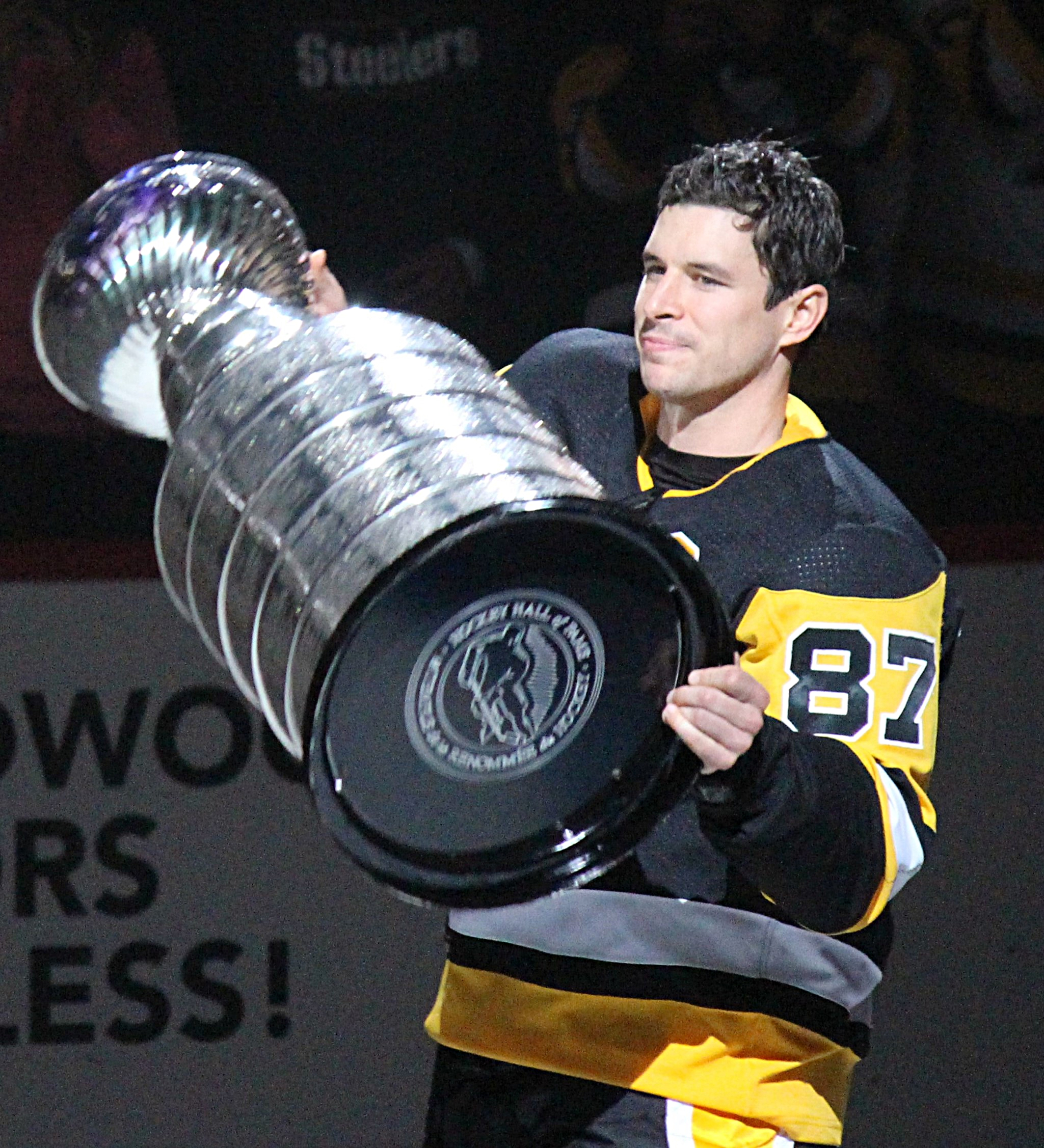
As of 2025, Sidney Crosby has topped the list of lifetime salary since completion of the 2020–21 season.

The team salary cap was $81.5 million. No player could earn more than $16.3 million.

1. Auston Matthews (Toronto Maple Leafs $15.9 million
2. Mitch Marner (Toronto Maple Leafs) $15 million
3. Connor McDavid (Edmonton Oilers) $14 million
4. Artemi Panarin (New York Rangers) $13 million
5. Sergei Bobrovsky (Florida Panthers) $12 million

=== 2021–22 season ===
The team salary cap was $81.5 million. No player could earn more than $16.3 million.

1. Erik Karlsson (San Jose Sharks) $14.5 million
2. Connor McDavid (Edmonton Oilers) $13 million
  Artemi Panarin (New York Rangers) $13 million
  Carey Price (Montreal Canadiens) $13 million
  Tyler Seguin (Dallas Stars) $13 million

=== 2022–23 season ===
The team salary cap was $82.5 million. No player could earn more than $16.5 million.

1. Tyler Seguin (Dallas Stars) $13 million
2. Artemi Panarin (New York Rangers) $12.5 million
3. Aleksander Barkov (Florida Panthers) $12 million
  Sergei Bobrovsky (Florida Panthers) $12 million
  Connor McDavid (Edmonton Oilers) $12 million

=== 2023–24 season ===
The team salary cap was $83.5 million. No player could earn more than $16.7 million.

1. Nathan MacKinnon (Colorado Avalanche) $16.5 million
2. David Pastrnak (Boston Bruins) $13 million
3. Dougie Hamilton (New Jersey Devils) $12.6 million
4. Seth Jones (Chicago Blackhawks) $12.5 million
5. Kirill Kaprizov (Minnesota Wild) $12.5 million

=== 2024–25 season ===
The team salary cap was $88 million. No player could earn more than $17.6 million.

1. Auston Matthews (Toronto Maple Leafs) $16.7 million
2. Nathan MacKinnon (Colorado Avalanche) $16.5 million
3. Elias Pettersson (Vancouver Canucks) $14.5 million
4. William Nylander (Toronto Maple Leafs) $13.5 million
5. Jake Guentzel (Tampa Bay Lightning) $13.26 million

=== 2025–26 season ===
The team salary cap was $95.5 million. No player could earn more than $19.1 million.

1. Leon Draisaitl (Edmonton Oilers) $16.5 million
2. Nathan MacKinnon (Colorado Avalanche) $16.05 million
3. Igor Shesterkin (New York Rangers) $15.825 million
4. Auston Matthews (Toronto Maple Leafs) $15.2 million
5. Mitch Marner (Vegas Golden Knights) $15 million

=== 2026–27 season ===
The team salary cap is $104 million. No player can earn more than $20.8 million.

1. Leo Carlsson (Anaheim Ducks) $20.8 million salary ($18 million AAV and cap hit)
2. Kirill Kaprizov (Minnesota Wild) $19.1 million salary ($17 million AAV and cap hit)
3. Jack Eichel (Vegas Golden Knights) $17.7 million salary ($13.5 million AAV and cap hit)
4. Connor Bedard (Chicago Blackhawks) $17 million salary ($15 million AAV and cap hit)
5. Leon Draisaitl (Edmonton Oilers) $16.5 million salary ($14 million AAV and cap hit)

=== 2027-28 season (projected) ===
The team salary cap is projected to rise to $113.5 million, with the final number expected to be announced jointly by the NHL and NHLPA in or around May 2027. No player can earn more than 20% of that projection, which is therefore likely to be $22.7 million.

1. Cale Makar (Colorado Avalanche) $20.8 million salary ($20.4 million AAV and cap hit)
  Macklin Celebrini (San Jose Sharks) $20.8 million salary ($18.8 million AAV and cap hit)
2. Kirill Kaprizov (Minnesota Wild) $19.1 million salary ($17 million AAV and cap hit)
3. Leo Carlsson (Anaheim Ducks) $19 million salary ($18 million AAV and cap hit)
4. Jack Eichel (Vegas Golden Knights) $17.7 million salary ($13.5 million AAV and cap hit)
5. Leon Draisaitl (Edmonton Oilers) $16.5 million salary ($14 million AAV and cap hit)

=== 2028-29 season (projected) ===
The team salary cap is tentatively projected to rise to $127.5 million, based on the report made at the September 2026 NHL Board of Governors meeting. This would be the largest season-to-season jump in the NHL's salary cap era, a roughly 12% increase. No player can earn more than 20% of that projection, which would tentatively set the maximum salary at $25.5 million.

== Sample salaries from earlier seasons ==
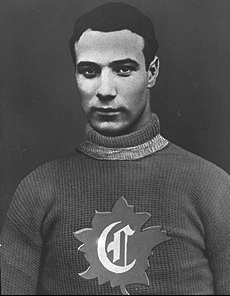
Newsy Lalonde was earning CAN $1,300 during the 1917–18 NHL season, which is equivalent to approximately $25,000 CAD in today's funds.

Salary figures prior to the 1989–90 season are not readily available. The following table presents a sample of salaries from various seasons; the players listed were not necessarily the highest paid that year.

Season	Player name	Salary
1917–18	Newsy Lalonde	CAN $1,300
1921–22	Newsy Lalonde	CAN $2,000
1923–24	Howie Morenz	CAN $3,500
1925–26	Frank Fredrickson	CAN $3,500
1942–43	Ronnie Rowe (Note: Ronnie Rowe was offered a rookie contract of $2,900 plus $100 as a signing bonus. The contract was declined, and Rowe stayed in juniors to play with the OHA's Toronto Marlboros)	CAN $3,000
1953–54	Jean Beliveau	CAN $21,000
1954–55	Jean Beliveau	CAN $21,000
1955–56	Jean Beliveau	CAN $21,000
1956–57	Jean Beliveau	CAN $21,000
1957–58	Jean Beliveau	CAN $21,000
1959–60	Doug Harvey	CAN $25,000
1959–60	Maurice Richard	CAN $25,000
1962–63	Frank Mahovlich	CAN $25,000
1963–64	(NHL minimum salary)	CAN $7,000
1963–64	Phil Esposito	US $54,990
1965–66	Gump Worsley	CAN $28,000
1966–67	Bobby Orr	US $35,000
1967–68	Bobby Orr	US $35,000
1967–68	Derek Sanderson	US $10,000
1969–70	Derek Sanderson	US $13,000
1974–75	Mario Tremblay	CAN $80,000
1977–78	Bobby Hull (Note: Bobby Hull was playing the World Hockey Association at this time, a short-lived rival to the NHL.)	US $1,000,000
1977–78	Bernie Parent	US $1,000,000
1977–78	Derek Sanderson	US $1,000,000
1982–83	Brian Hayward	US $65,000

== See also ==
- Salary cap
- NHL Players Association
- List of highest-paid NBA players by season
- List of highest-paid Major League Baseball players
- List of salaries
