= National Football Conference =

One of two conferences in the National Football League

- National Football Conference logo (2010–present)
- Formerly: National Football League (NFL), pre–merger
- League: National Football League
- Sport: American football
- Founded: 1970
- No. of teams: 16
- Most recent champion: Seattle Seahawks (4th title) (2025)
- Most titles: Dallas Cowboys; San Francisco 49ers (8 titles)

The National Football Conference (NFC) is a conference of the National Football League (NFL), the highest level of professional American football in the United States. The NFC and its counterpart, the American Football Conference (AFC), each have 16 teams organized into four divisions. Both conferences were created as part of the 1970 NFL merger with the rival American Football League (AFL). All ten of the former AFL teams and three NFL teams formed the AFC while the remaining thirteen NFL clubs formed the NFC. A series of league expansions and division realignments have occurred since the merger, thus making a total of 16 clubs in each conference.

The defending champions of the NFC are the Seattle Seahawks, who defeated the Los Angeles Rams in the 2025 season's NFC Championship Game for their fourth conference championship in the team's history.

As of 2026, the NFC only has one defined officer, the president, which is essentially an honorary position with few powers and mostly ceremonial duties, including awarding the conference championship trophy.

== Teams ==
Since 2002, like the AFC, the NFC has 16 teams that are organized into four divisions each with four teams: East, North, South, and West.

Division	Team	Stadium	Location
East	Dallas Cowboys	AT&T Stadium	Arlington, Texas
East	New York Giants	MetLife Stadium	East Rutherford, New Jersey
East	Philadelphia Eagles	Lincoln Financial Field	Philadelphia, Pennsylvania
East	Washington Commanders	Northwest Stadium	Landover, Maryland
North	Chicago Bears	Soldier Field	Chicago, Illinois
North	Detroit Lions	Ford Field	Detroit, Michigan
North	Green Bay Packers	Lambeau Field	Green Bay, Wisconsin
North	Minnesota Vikings	U.S. Bank Stadium	Minneapolis, Minnesota
South	Atlanta Falcons	Mercedes-Benz Stadium	Atlanta, Georgia
South	Carolina Panthers	Bank of America Stadium	Charlotte, North Carolina
South	New Orleans Saints	Caesars Superdome	New Orleans, Louisiana
South	Tampa Bay Buccaneers	Raymond James Stadium	Tampa, Florida
West	Arizona Cardinals	State Farm Stadium	Glendale, Arizona
West	Los Angeles Rams	SoFi Stadium	Inglewood, California
West	San Francisco 49ers	Levi's Stadium	Santa Clara, California
West	Seattle Seahawks	Lumen Field	Seattle, Washington

== Season structure ==
POS	AFC East	AFC North	AFC South	AFC West
1st	Bills	Ravens	Texans	Chiefs
2nd	Dolphins	Steelers	Colts	Chargers
3rd	Jets	Bengals	Jaguars	Broncos
4th	Patriots	Browns	Titans	Raiders
POS	NFC East	NFC North	NFC South	NFC West
1st	Eagles	Lions	Buccaneers	Rams
2nd	Commanders	Vikings	Falcons	Seahawks
3rd	Cowboys	Packers	Panthers	Cardinals
4th	Giants	Bears	Saints	49ers

This chart of the 2024 season standings displays an application of the NFL scheduling formula. The Eagles in 2024 finished in first place in the NFC East. Thus, in 2025, the Eagles (highlighted in green) will play two games against each of its division rivals (highlighted in light blue), one game against each team in the NFC North and AFC West (highlighted in yellow), and one game each against the first-place finishers in the NFC South, NFC West (highlighted in orange), and AFC East (highlighted in pink).

The fourteen opponents each team faces over the 17-game regular season schedule are set using a predetermined formula:

Each NFC team plays the other teams in their respective division twice (home and away) during the regular season, in addition to eleven other games assigned to their schedule by the NFL: three games are assigned on the basis of a particular team's final divisional standing from the previous season, and the remaining eight games are split between the roster of two other NFL divisions. This assignment shifts each year and will follow a standard cycle. Using the 2023 regular season schedule as an example, each team in the NFC East plays against every team in the NFC West and AFC East. In this way, non-divisional competition will be mostly among common opponents – the exception being the three games assigned based on the team's prior-season divisional standing.

At the end of each season, the four division winners and three wild cards (non-division winners with best regular season record) in the NFC qualify for the playoffs. The NFC playoffs culminate in the NFC Championship Game with the winner receiving the George S. Halas Trophy. The NFC champion then plays the AFC champion in the Super Bowl. As of 2026, the NFC representative team has won the Super Bowl 29 out of the 55 total editions with the Philadelphia Eagles being the most recent to do so in 2025. The Dallas Cowboys and San Francisco 49ers are currently both tied for the most NFC conference championships with 8 and the most Super Bowls won by a member of the NFC with 5.

== History ==
Both the AFC and NFC were created after the NFL merged with the American Football League (AFL) in 1970. When the AFL began play in 1960 with eight teams, the NFL consisted of 13 clubs. By 1969, the AFL had expanded to ten teams and the NFL to 16 clubs. In order to balance the merged league, all ten of the former AFL teams along with the NFL's Cleveland Browns, Pittsburgh Steelers, and Baltimore Colts formed the AFC, while the remaining 13 NFL teams formed the NFC.

While the newly formed AFC had already agreed upon and set up their divisional alignment plan along almost purely geographic lines, team owners could not agree to a plan on how to align the clubs in the NFC. The alignment proposals were narrowed down to five finalists (each one sealed in an envelope), and then the plan that was eventually selected was picked out of a glass bowl by then-NFL commissioner Pete Rozelle's secretary, Thelma Elkjer, on January 16, 1970.

The five alignment plans for the NFC in 1970 were as follows, with Plan 3 eventually selected:

- Plan 1
  - Eastern – Atlanta Falcons, Minnesota Vikings, New York Giants, Philadelphia Eagles, Washington Redskins
  - Central – Chicago Bears, Detroit Lions, Green Bay Packers, New Orleans Saints
  - Western – Dallas Cowboys, Los Angeles Rams, St. Louis Cardinals, San Francisco 49ers
- Plan 2
  - Eastern – Minnesota, New York, Philadelphia, Washington
  - Central – Atlanta, Dallas, New Orleans, St. Louis
  - Western – Chicago, Detroit, Green Bay, Los Angeles, San Francisco
- Plan 3
  - Eastern – Dallas, New York, Philadelphia, St. Louis, Washington
  - Central – Chicago, Detroit, Green Bay, Minnesota
  - Western – Atlanta, Los Angeles, New Orleans, San Francisco
- Plan 4
  - Eastern – Minnesota, New York, Philadelphia, St. Louis, Washington
  - Central – Atlanta, Chicago, Detroit, Green Bay
  - Western – Dallas, New Orleans, Los Angeles, San Francisco
- Plan 5
  - Eastern – Detroit, Minnesota, New York, Philadelphia, Washington
  - Central – Chicago, Dallas, Green Bay, St. Louis
  - Western – Atlanta, Los Angeles, New Orleans, San Francisco

Three expansion teams have joined the NFC since the merger, thus making the total 16. When the Seattle Seahawks and the Tampa Bay Buccaneers joined the league in 1976, they were temporarily placed in the NFC and AFC, respectively, for one season before they switched conferences. The Seahawks returned to the NFC as a result of the 2002 realignment. The Carolina Panthers joined the NFC in 1995.

Parity is generally greater among NFC teams than AFC teams. The only NFC team that has never made a Super Bowl appearance is the Detroit Lions. Since the 2002 division realignment, the NFC has sent 12 different teams to the Super Bowl—all except the Lions, Vikings, Cowboys, and Commanders—whereas the AFC has only sent 8: Baltimore Ravens, Cincinnati Bengals, Las Vegas Raiders, Kansas City Chiefs, Denver Broncos, Indianapolis Colts, Pittsburgh Steelers, and New England Patriots. The only NFC team to make back to back Super Bowls since 2002 is the Seattle Seahawks.

As of 2025, the only pre-merger team that does not play in its 1969 market is the St. Louis Cardinals, who moved in 1988 to the Phoenix suburb of Tempe (they moved to Glendale in 2006). The Los Angeles Rams moved to St. Louis in 1995, but moved back to Los Angeles in 2016. None of the expansion teams added after 1970 have relocated.

With the exception of the aforementioned relocations since that time, the divisional setup established in 2002 has remained static ever since.

== Logo ==
Original National Football Conference logo (1970–2009)

The original NFC logo, in use from 1970 to 2009, depicted a blue 'N' with three stars across it. The new logo was similar to that of the AFC (which itself was similar to the AFL logo) in that unlike the NFL logo it consisted of a single letter instead of a full abbreviation. The three stars represented the three divisions that were used from 1970 to 2001 (Eastern, Central and Western). The 2010 NFL season brought an updated NFC logo. Largely similar to the old logo, the new logo has a fourth star, representing the four divisions that have composed the NFC since 2002, with the AFC logo being simultaneously updated in a similar manner.

== Television ==
After the 1970 merger was officially completed, the combined league retained the services of CBS and NBC, who were the primary broadcasters of the NFL and the AFL, respectively. It was originally decided that CBS would televise all NFC teams (the "NFC package") and NBC would be responsible for all AFC teams (the "AFC package"). For interconference games, CBS would broadcast them if the visiting team was from the NFC, and NBC if the visitors were from the AFC. A deal was also signed for ABC to televise Monday Night Football (MNF), a marquee game regardless of the conference of the two opponents. The league would eventually carve out additional marquee packages such as Sunday Night Football (SNF) on ESPN in 1987 and Thursday Night Football (TNF) on NFL Network in 2006.

These packages shifted between broadcasters. The NFC package moved from CBS to Fox in 1994, CBS took over the AFC package from NBC in 1998, and then the league introduced "cross-flexing" in 2014 to assign CBS and Fox select games from the other conference. ESPN in 1987 originally only televised SNF for the second half of the season, TNT began televising SNF for the first half of the season in 1990, ESPN took over SNF throughout the entire season in 1998, and the entire package moved to NBC in 2006. ESPN then took over MNF from ABC in 2006 before letting its sister network to air select games (either simulcast or exclusive) in 2020. TNF games also were simulcast on CBS or NBC (2014–2017), Fox (2018–2021), and Amazon Prime Video (2017–2021) before Prime Video acquired exclusive rights to the package in 2022.

For the playoffs, it was originally decided in 1970 that the holder of the AFC package (then NBC, now CBS) would televise all AFC games, the holder of the NFC package (then CBS, now Fox) would televise all NFC games, and the Super Bowl would rotate annually between NBC for odd-numbered games and CBS for even-numbered games. ABC was added to the Super Bowl rotation in the 1984 season and then would start airing the two Wild Card games (regardless of conference) that were added when the playoffs expanded to 12 teams in 1990. ABC's postseason rights moved to NBC in 2006 when the former lost MNF and the latter won SNF. 2014 saw ESPN take away the rights to one Wild Card game from NBC, and NBC a Divisional playoff game from CBS in even-years and Fox in odd-years. The 2020 playoff expansion to a 14-team system then gave the league two extra games to offer short-term deals to interested broadcasters.

== See also ==
- NFC Championship Game
- American Football Conference
