= Forbes list of the world's highest-paid female athletes =

Wikimedia list-Article

This is a list of the highest-paid female athletes in the world as ranked by Forbes magazine.

== 2025 list ==
The 2025 list:

Rank	Name	Sport	Country	Total	Salary/winnings	Endorsements
1	Coco Gauff	Tennis	United States	$33.0 million	$8 million	$25 million
2	Aryna Sabalenka	Tennis	Belarus	$30.0 million	$15 million	$15 million
3	Iga Świątek	Tennis	Poland	$25.1 million	$10.1 million	$15 million
4	Eileen Gu	Freestyle skiing	China	$23.1 million	$0.1 million	$23 million
5	Zheng Qinwen	Tennis	China	$22.6 million	$1.6 million	$21 million
6	Madison Keys	Tennis	United States	$13.4 million	$4.4 million	$9 million
7	Nelly Korda	Golf	United States	$13.0 million	$3 million	$10 million
8	Naomi Osaka	Tennis	Japan	$12.5 million	$2.5 million	$10 million
8	Elena Rybakina	Tennis	Kazakhstan	$12.5 million	$8.5 million	$4 million
10	Jessica Pegula	Tennis	United States	$12.3 million	$5.3 million	$7 million

No female athlete was featured on the Forbes 2025 list of highest-paid athletes in the world, which lists the 50 highest paid athletes regardless of gender.

== 2024 list ==
The 2024 list:

Rank	Name	Sport	Country	Total	Salary/winnings	Endorsements
1	Coco Gauff	Tennis	United States	$34.4 million	$9.4 million	$25 million
2	Iga Świątek	Tennis	Poland	$23.8 million	$8.8 million	$15 million
3	Eileen Gu	Freestyle skiing	China	$22.1 million	$0.1 million	$22 million
4	Zheng Qinwen	Tennis	China	$20.6 million	$5.6 million	$15 million
5	Aryna Sabalenka	Tennis	Belarus	$18.7 million	$9.7 million	$9 million
6	Naomi Osaka	Tennis	Japan	$12.9 million	$0.9 million	$12 million
6	Emma Raducanu	Tennis	United Kingdom	$12.9 million	$0.9 million	$12 million
8	Nelly Korda	Golf	United States	$12.5 million	$4.5 million	$8 million
9	Venus Williams	Tennis	United States	$12.1 million	$0.1 million	$12 million
10	Simone Biles	Gymnastics	United States	$11.2 million	$0.2 million	$11 million

No female athlete was features on the Forbes 2024 list of highest-paid athletes in the world, which lists the 50 highest paid athletes regardless of gender.

== 2023 list ==
The 2023 list:

Rank	Name	Sport	Country	Total	Salary/winnings	Endorsements
1	Iga Świątek	Tennis	Poland	$23.9 million	$9.9 million	$14 million
2	Eileen Gu	Freestyle skiing	China	$22.1 million	$0.1 million	$22 million
3	Coco Gauff	Tennis	United States	$21.7 million	$6.7 million	$15 million
4	Emma Raducanu	Tennis	United Kingdom	$15.2 million	$0.2 million	$15 million
5	Naomi Osaka	Tennis	Japan	$15.0 million	$0 million	$15 million
6	Aryna Sabalenka	Tennis	Belarus	$14.7 million	$8.2 million	$6.5 million
7	Jessica Pegula	Tennis	United States	$12.5 million	$6 million	$6.5 million
8	Venus Williams	Tennis	United States	$12.2 million	$0.2 million	$12 million
9	Elena Rybakina	Tennis	Kazakhstan	$9.5 million	$5.5 million	$4 million
10	Leylah Fernandez	Tennis	Canada	$8.8 million	$1.8 million	$7 million

Forbes reported that American tennis player Serena Williams was featured on its 2023 list of highest-paid athletes in the world, which lists the 50 highest paid athletes regardless of gender, but she was excluded from the list of highest-paid female athletes following her retirement from sports. Her gross earnings were reportedly $45.3 million, placing her 49th on the list.

== 2022 list ==
The 2022 list:

Rank	Name	Sport	Country	Total	Salary/winnings	Endorsements
1	Naomi Osaka	Tennis	Japan	$51.1 million	$1.1 million	$50 million
2	Serena Williams	Tennis	United States	$41.3 million	$0.3 million	$41 million
3	Eileen Gu	Freestyle skiing	China	$20.1 million	$0.1 million	$20 million
4	Emma Raducanu	Tennis	United Kingdom	$18.7 million	$0.7 million	$18 million
5	Iga Świątek	Tennis	Poland	$14.9 million	$9.9 million	$5 million
6	Venus Williams	Tennis	United States	$12.1 million	$0.1 million	$12 million
7	Coco Gauff	Tennis	United States	$11.1 million	$3.1 million	$8 million
8	Simone Biles	Gymnastics	United States	$10.0 million	$0 million	$10 million
9	Jessica Pegula	Tennis	United States	$7.6 million	$3.6 million	$4 million
10	Minjee Lee	Golf	Australia	$7.3 million	$4.8 million	$2.5 million

Forbes reported that Japanese tennis player Naomi Osaka was ranked 19th and American tennis player Serena Williams was ranked 31st on its 2022 list of highest-paid athletes in the world, which lists the 50 highest paid athletes regardless of gender.

== 2021 list ==
The 2021 list:

Rank	Name	Sport	Country	Total	Salary/winnings	Endorsements
1	Naomi Osaka	Tennis	Japan	$57.3 million	$2.3 million	$55 million
2	Serena Williams	Tennis	United States	$45.9 million	$0.9 million	$45 million
3	Venus Williams	Tennis	United States	$11.3 million	$0.3 million	$11 million
4	Simone Biles	Gymnastics	United States	$10.1 million	$0.1 million	$10 million
5	Garbiñe Muguruza	Tennis	Spain	$8.8 million	$6 million	$2.8 million
6	Ko Jin-young	Golf	South Korea	$7.5 million	$3.5 million	$4 million
7	P. V. Sindhu	Badminton	India	$7.2 million	$0.2 million	$7 million
8	Ashleigh Barty	Tennis	Australia	$6.9 million	$3.9 million	$3 million
9	Nelly Korda	Golf	United States	$5.9 million	$2.4 million	$3.5 million
10	Candace Parker	Basketball	United States	$5.7 million	$0.2 million	$5.5 million

Forbes reported that Japanese tennis player Naomi Osaka was ranked 12th and American tennis player Serena Williams was ranked 29th on its 2021 list of highest-paid athletes in the world, which lists the 50 highest paid athletes regardless of gender.

== 2020 list ==
The 2020 list:

Rank	Name	Sport	Country	Total	Salary/winnings	Endorsements
1	Naomi Osaka	Tennis	Japan	$37.4 million	$3.4 million	$34 million
2	Serena Williams	Tennis	United States	$36.0 million	$4 million	$32 million
3	Ashleigh Barty	Tennis	Australia	$13.1 million	$10.1 million	$3 million
4	Simona Halep	Tennis	Romania	$10.9 million	$6.9 million	$4 million
5	Bianca Andreescu	Tennis	Canada	$8.9 million	$4.9 million	$4 million
6	Garbiñe Muguruza	Tennis	Spain	$6.6 million	$2.1 million	$4.5 million
7	Elina Svitolina	Tennis	Ukraine	$6.4 million	$5.4 million	$1 million
8	Sofia Kenin	Tennis	United States	$5.8 million	$4.8 million	$1 million
9	Angelique Kerber	Tennis	Germany	$5.3 million	$1.3 million	$4 million
10	Alex Morgan	Association football	United States	$4.6 million	$0.4 million	$4.2 million

Forbes reported that Japanese tennis player Naomi Osaka was ranked 29th and American tennis player Serena Williams was ranked 33rd on its 2020 list of highest-paid athletes in the world, which lists the 100 highest paid athletes regardless of gender.

== 2019 list ==
The 2019 list:

Rank	Name	Sport	Country	Total	Salary/winnings	Endorsements
1	Serena Williams	Tennis	United States	$29.2 million	$4.2 million	$25 million
2	Naomi Osaka	Tennis	Japan	$24.3 million	$8.3 million	$16 million
3	Angelique Kerber	Tennis	Germany	$11.8 million	$5.3 million	$6.5 million
4	Simona Halep	Tennis	Romania	$10.2 million	$6.2 million	$4 million
5	Sloane Stephens	Tennis	United States	$9.6 million	$4.1 million	$5.5 million
6	Caroline Wozniacki	Tennis	Denmark	$7.5 million	$3.5 million	$4 million
7	Maria Sharapova	Tennis	Russia	$7.0 million	$1 million	$6 million
8	Karolina Pliskova	Tennis	Czech Republic	$6.3 million	$4.6 million	$1.7 million
9	Elina Svitolina	Tennis	Ukraine	$6.1 million	$4.6 million	$1.5 million
10	Venus Williams	Tennis	United States	$5.9 million	$0.9 million	$5 million
10	Garbiñe Muguruza	Tennis	Spain	$5.9 million	$2.4 million	$3.5 million

Forbes reported that American tennis player Serena Williams was ranked 63rd on its 2019 list of highest-paid athletes in the world, which lists the 100 highest paid athletes regardless of gender.

== 2018 list ==
The 2018 list:

Rank	Name	Sport	Country	Total	Salary/winnings	Endorsements
1	Serena Williams	Tennis	United States	$18.1 million	$0.06 million	$18 million
2	Caroline Wozniacki	Tennis	Denmark	$13.0 million	$7 million	$6 million
3	Sloane Stephens	Tennis	United States	$11.2 million	$5.7 million	$5.5 million
4	Garbiñe Muguruza	Tennis	Spain	$11.0 million	$5.5 million	$5.5 million
5	Maria Sharapova	Tennis	Russia	$10.5 million	$1 million	$9.5 million
6	Venus Williams	Tennis	United States	$10.2 million	$4.2 million	$6 million
7	P. V. Sindhu	Badminton	India	$8.5 million	$0.5 million	$8 million
8	Simona Halep	Tennis	Romania	$7.7 million	$6.2 million	$1.5 million
9	Danica Patrick	Auto racing	United States	$7.5 million	$3 million	$4.5 million
10	Angelique Kerber	Tennis	Germany	$7.0 million	$3 million	$4 million

No female athlete was features on the Forbes 2018 list of highest-paid athletes in the world, which lists the 100 highest paid athletes regardless of gender.

== 2017 list ==
The 2017 list:

Rank	Name	Sport	Country	Total	Salary/winnings	Endorsements
1	Serena Williams	Tennis	United States	$27.0 million	$8 million	$19 million
2	Angelique Kerber	Tennis	Germany	$12.6 million	$7.6 million	$5 million
3	Danica Patrick	Auto racing	United States	$12.2 million	$7.2 million	$5 million
4	Ronda Rousey	Mixed martial arts	United States	$11.0 million	$8 million	$3 million
5	Venus Williams	Tennis	United States	$10.5 million	$3.5 million	$7 million
6	Garbiñe Muguruza	Tennis	Spain	$7.7 million	$4.2 million	$3.5 million
7	Caroline Wozniacki	Tennis	Denmark	$7.5 million	$2.5 million	$5 million
8	Agnieszka Radwanska	Tennis	Poland	$7.3 million	$3.3 million	$4 million
9	Eugenie Bouchard	Tennis	Canada	$7.1 million	$0.6 million	$6.5 million
10	Simona Halep	Tennis	Romania	$6.2 million	$4.7 million	$1.5 million

Forbes reported that American tennis player Serena Williams was ranked 51st on its 2017 list of highest-paid athletes in the world, which lists the 100 highest paid athletes regardless of gender.

== 2016 list ==
The 2016 list:

Rank	Name	Sport	Country	Total	Salary/winnings	Endorsements
1	Serena Williams	Tennis	United States	$28.9 million	$8.9 million	$20 million
2	Maria Sharapova	Tennis	Russia	$21.9 million	$1.9 million	$20 million
3	Ronda Rousey	Mixed martial arts	United States	$14.0 million	$10 million	$4 million
4	Danica Patrick	Auto racing	United States	$13.9 million	$7.9 million	$6 million
5	Agnieszka Radwanska	Tennis	Poland	$10.2 million	$5.2 million	$5 million
6	Caroline Wozniacki	Tennis	Denmark	$8.0 million	$1 million	$7 million
7	Garbiñe Muguruza	Tennis	Spain	$7.6 million	$4.6 million	$3 million
8	Ana Ivanovic	Tennis	Serbia	$7.4 million	$1.9 million	$5.5 million
9	Victoria Azarenka	Tennis	Belarus	$6.6 million	$3.6 million	$3 million
10	Eugenie Bouchard	Tennis	Canada	$6.2 million	$0.7 million	$5.5 million

Forbes reported that American tennis player Serena Williams was ranked 40th and Russian tennis player Maria Sharapova was ranked 88th on its 2016 list of highest-paid athletes in the world, which lists the 100 highest paid athletes regardless of gender.

== 2015 list ==
The 2015 list:

Rank	Name	Sport	Nation	Total	Salary/Winnings	Endorsements
1	Maria Sharapova	Tennis	Russia	$29.7 million	$6.7 million	$23 million
2	Serena Williams	Tennis	United States	$24.6 million	$11.6 million	$13 million
3	Caroline Wozniacki	Tennis	Denmark	$14.6 million	$3.6 million	$11 million
4	Danica Patrick	Auto racing	United States	$13.9 million	$7.9 million	$6 million
5	Ana Ivanovic	Tennis	Serbia	$8.3 million	$1.8 million	$6.5 million
6	Petra Kvitová	Tennis	Czech Republic	$7.7 million	$5.9 million	$1.8 million
7	Simona Halep	Tennis	Romania	$7.6 million	$5.3 million	$1.5 million
8	Ronda Rousey	Mixed martial arts	United States	$6.5 million	$3 million	$3.5 million
9	Stacy Lewis	Golf	United States	$6.4 million	$2.4 million	$4 million
10	Agnieszka Radwanska	Tennis	Poland	$6.0 million	$2 million	$4 million

Forbes reported that Russian tennis player Maria Sharapova was ranked 26th and American tennis player Serena Williams was ranked 47th on its 2015 list of highest-paid athletes in the world, which lists the 100 highest paid athletes regardless of gender.

== 2014 list ==
The 2014 list:

Rank	Name	Sport	Nation	Total	Salary/Winnings	Endorsements
1	Maria Sharapova	Tennis	Russia	$24.4 million	$2.4 million	$22 million
2	Li Na	Tennis	China	$23.6 million	$5.6 million	$18 million
3	Serena Williams	Tennis	United States	$22.0 million	$11 million	$11 million
4	Kim Yuna	Figure Skating	South Korea	$16.3 million	$0.3 million	$16 million
5	Danica Patrick	Auto racing	United States	$15.0 million	$7 million	$8 million
6	Victoria Azarenka	Tennis	Belarus	$11.1 million	$3.6 million	$7.5 million
7	Caroline Wozniacki	Tennis	Denmark	$10.8 million	$1.3 million	$9.5 million
8	Agnieszka Radwanska	Tennis	Poland	$6.8 million	$3.8 million	$3 million
9	Ana Ivanovic	Tennis	Serbia	$6.4 million	$1.4 million	$5 million
10	Paula Creamer	Golf	United States	$5.5 million	$1 million	$4.5 million

Forbes reported that Russian tennis player Maria Sharapova was ranked 34th, Chinese tennis player Li Na was ranked 41st, and American tennis player Serena Williams was ranked 55th on its 2014 list of highest-paid athletes in the world, which lists the 100 highest paid athletes regardless of gender.

== 2013 list ==
The 2013 list:

Rank	Name	Sport	Nation	Total	Salary/Winnings	Endorsements
1	Maria Sharapova	Tennis	Russia	$29.0 million	$6 million	$23 million
2	Serena Williams	Tennis	United States	$20.5 million	$8.5 million	$12 million
3	Li Na	Tennis	China	$18.2 million	$3.2 million	$15 million
4	Victoria Azarenka	Tennis	Belarus	$15.7 million	$6.7 million	$9 million
5	Danica Patrick	Auto racing	United States	$15.0 million	$6 million	$9 million
6	Kim Yuna	Figure Skating	South Korea	$14.0 million	$0 million	$14 million
7	Caroline Wozniacki	Tennis	Denmark	$13.6 million	$2.6 million	$11 million
8	Agnieszka Radwanska	Tennis	Poland	$7.4 million	$4.9 million	$2.5 million
9	Ana Ivanovic	Tennis	Serbia	$7.0 million	$1 million	$6 million
10	Paula Creamer	Golf	United States	$5.5 million	$1 million	$4.5 million

Forbes reported that Russian tennis player Maria Sharapova was ranked 22nd, American tennis player Serena Williams was ranked 68th, and Chinese tennis player Li Na was ranked 85th on its 2013 list of highest-paid athletes in the world, which lists the 100 highest paid athletes regardless of gender.

== 2012 list ==
The 2012 list:

Rank	Name	Sport	Nationality	Total earnings	Salary/winnings^{1}	Endorsements^{1}
1	Maria Sharapova	Tennis	Russia	$27.1 million	-	-
2	Li Na	Tennis	China	$18.4 million	-	-
3	Serena Williams	Tennis	United States	$16.3 million	-	-
4	Caroline Wozniacki	Tennis	Denmark	$13.7 million	-	-
5	Danica Patrick	Auto racing	United States	$13.0 million	-	-
6	Victoria Azarenka	Tennis	Belarus	$9.7 million	-	-
7	Kim Yuna	Figure Skating	South Korea	$9.0 million	-	-
8	Ana Ivanovic	Tennis	Serbia	$7.2 million	-	-
9	Agnieszka Radwanska	Tennis	Poland	$6.9 million	-	-
10	Yani Tseng	Golf	Taiwan	$5.5 million	-	-
Notes:^{1} Earnings were not broken down between salary/winnings and endorsements in the 2012 list.

Forbes reported that Russian tennis player Maria Sharapova was ranked 26th and Chinese tennis player Li Na was ranked 81st on its 2012 list of highest-paid athletes in the world, which lists the 100 highest paid athletes regardless of gender.

== Statistics ==
=== Most No. 1 appearances ===
Rank	Name	Sport	Nationality	Winner
1	Maria Sharapova	Tennis	Russia	4 (2012, 2013, 2014, 2015)
1	Serena Williams	Tennis	United States	4 (2016, 2017, 2018, 2019)
3	Naomi Osaka	Tennis	Japan	3 (2020, 2021, 2022)
4	Coco Gauff	Tennis	United States	2 (2024, 2025)
5	Iga Świątek	Tennis	Poland	1 (2023)

=== Most Top 10 appearances ===
Rank	Name	Sport	Nationality	Top 10
1	Serena Williams	Tennis	United States	11
2	Caroline Wozniacki	Tennis	Denmark	8
3	Maria Sharapova	Tennis	Russia	7
3	Naomi Osaka	Tennis	Japan	7
3	Danica Patrick	Auto racing	United States	7
6	Venus Williams	Tennis	United States	7
6	Agnieszka Radwanska	Tennis	Poland	6
6	Garbiñe Muguruza	Tennis	Spain	6
9	Ana Ivanovic	Tennis	Serbia	5
9	Simona Halep	Tennis	Romania	5

== See also ==
- Forbes list of the world's highest-paid athletes
- Gender pay gap in sports
- List of professional sports leagues by revenue
- List of salaries
