= List of highest-paid NBA players by season =

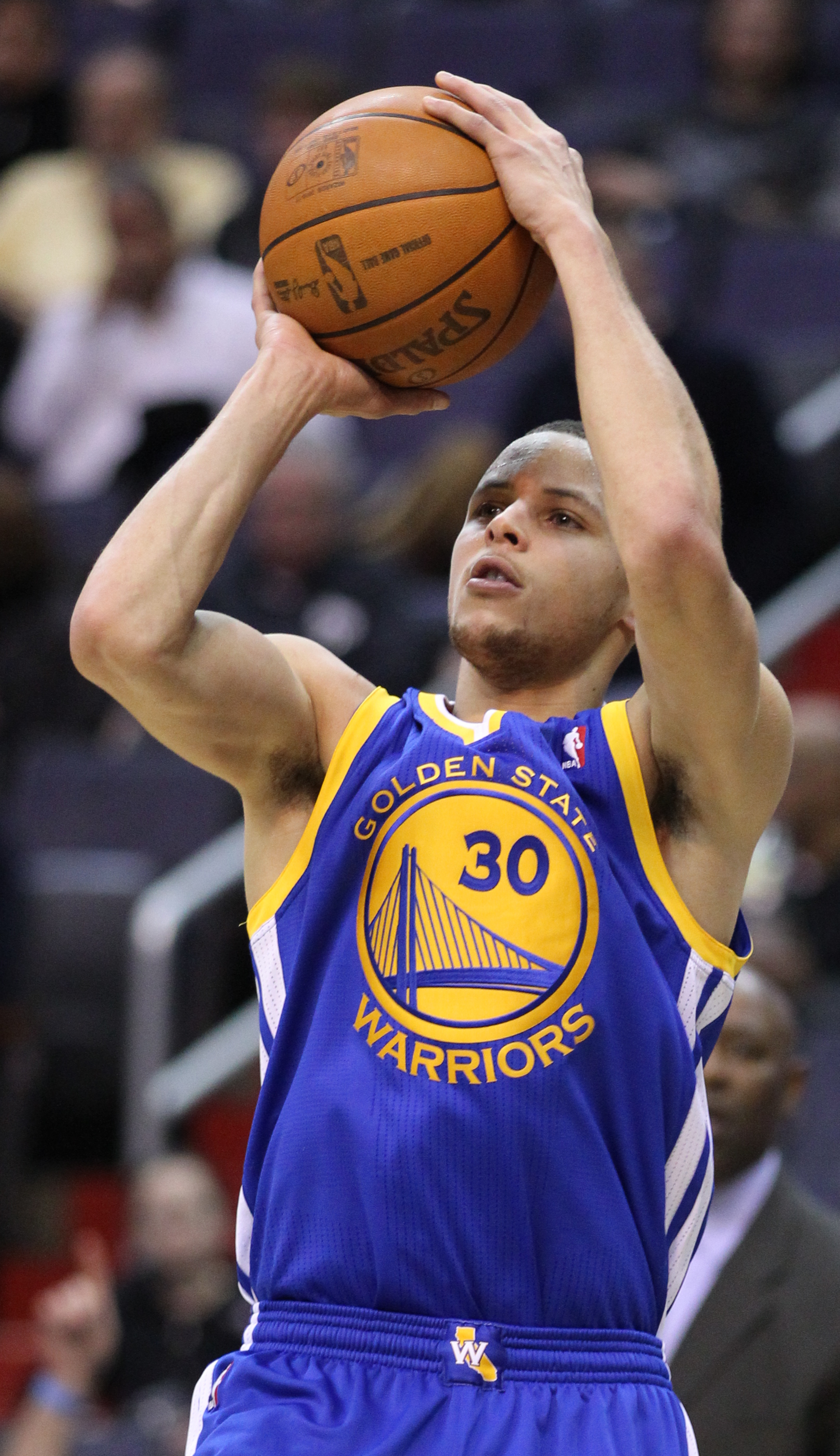
Stephen Curry, the highest-paid player in the NBA, attempting a jump shot in the 2010–11 NBA season.

The highest-paid NBA players by season has recently eclipsed $40 million. Stephen Curry has the most seasons leading the league with 9. Michael Jordan holds the largest 1-year contract in NBA history, LeBron James is the highest career earner, and Stephen Curry is the highest season earner as well as the largest multi-year contract holder in NBA history.

During the 1946–47 NBA season Joe Fulks was the highest paid player ($8,000) in the Basketball Association of America and Bob Davies was the highest paid player ($12,500) of the National Basketball League.

George Mikan became the first player to earn $15,000 per season in the 1948–49 NBA season.

Wilt Chamberlain was the first player to receive $100,000 in the 1965–66 NBA season. That same season, Bill Russell became just the second player to receive over $100,000.

Moses Malone & Bill Walton were the first players to earn $1 million in a season, they were paid exactly $1,000,000 in the 1979–80 NBA season.

Larry Bird became the first player to earn $5 million or more with a salary of $7,070,000 in the 1991–92 NBA season.

Magic Johnson became the first player to earn $10 million or more in the 1994–95 NBA season with a salary of $14,660,000.

Patrick Ewing became the first player to earn $15 million or more in the 1995–96 NBA season with a salary of $18,724,000.

Michael Jordan became the first NBA player to sign a contract worth over $20 million and $30 million in a season (1996–97) and earned $33,140,000 in the 1997–98 NBA season, setting the record for the largest 1-year contract in NBA history, and held the overall record for over 20 years. Kobe Bryant became just the second player to eclipse $30 million when the 2013–14 NBA season began. LeBron James became the third in the 2016–17 NBA season.

Stephen Curry signed a record 5-year contract worth $201 million in 2017 with a starting payout of $34,682,550 in the 2017–18 NBA season, setting a new single-season record in earnings. He became the first player to eclipse $40 million in the 2019–20 NBA season. After signing a 4-year contract extension worth $215 million in 2021, Curry went on to become the first player to eclipse $50 million in the 2023–24 NBA season and is expected to be the first NBA player to eclipse $60 million in the 2026–27 NBA season, having signed a contract worth $62,587,158.

Starting from the 1984–85 NBA season, the NBA's first salary cap was introduced. The NBA salary cap is the maximum dollar amount each NBA team can spend on its players for the season. However, the NBA uses a "soft" salary cap, which allow NBA teams to exceed their allotted amount in order to sign players through significant "salary exceptions". The salary cap is determined during the offseason, but is liable to change.

An exception is necessary to sign a player for a contract that would exceed the salary cap threshold of the "soft cap". The Larry Bird exception, more commonly known as Bird Rights, allows teams to re-sign a current player only if he has played for that particular team for a minimum of three years. Another exception, known as the mid-level exception, allows for teams that are over the salary cap to sign one or more players as long as they do not exceed the total amount of the average NBA salary. Next, the bi-annual exception can be used by teams every other year to sign a free agent(s) for up to two years at an amount set by the NBA. Finally, the rookie player exception allows any NBA team to sign their first-round draft pick to a contract based upon a scale previously set forth by the NBA. Another option for teams would be to assign players to a league-assigned minimum salary contract for a maximum of two years.

== Highest-paid player by season ==
Year	Player	Team	Salary
1946–47	Joe Fulks	Philadelphia Warriors	$8,000
1947–48	George Mikan	Minneapolis Lakers	$12,500
1948–49	George Mikan	Minneapolis Lakers	$15,000
1949–50	George Mikan	Minneapolis Lakers	$15,000
1950–51	George Mikan Harry Boykoff	Minneapolis Lakers Tri-Cities Blackhawks	$15,000
1951–52	George Mikan	Minneapolis Lakers	$15,000
1952–53	George Mikan	Minneapolis Lakers	$20,000
1953–54	George Mikan	Minneapolis Lakers	$20,000
1955–56	Bob Cousy	Boston Celtics	$25,000
1956–57	Bob Cousy	Boston Celtics	$25,000
1957–58	Bob Cousy	Boston Celtics	$25,000
1958–59	Bob Cousy	Boston Celtics	$25,000
1959–60	Wilt Chamberlain	Philadelphia 76ers	$30,000
1960–61	Wilt Chamberlain	Philadelphia 76ers	$65,000
1961–62	Wilt Chamberlain	Philadelphia 76ers	$65,000
1962–63	Wilt Chamberlain	Philadelphia 76ers	$65,000
1963–64	Wilt Chamberlain	Philadelphia 76ers	$65,000
1964–65	Wilt Chamberlain	Philadelphia 76ers	$65,000
1965–66*	Bill Russell	Boston Celtics	$100,001
1966–67	Bill Russell	Boston Celtics	$100,001
1967–68	Bill Bradley	New York Knicks	$125,000
1968–69	Wilt Chamberlain	Los Angeles Lakers	$250,000
1969–70	Wilt Chamberlain Kareem Abdul-Jabbar (then Lew Alcindor)	Los Angeles Lakers Milwaukee Bucks	$250,000
1970–71	Pete Maravich	Atlanta Hawks	$380,000
1971–72	Pete Maravich	Atlanta Hawks	$380,000
1972–73	Pete Maravich	Atlanta Hawks	$380,000
1973–74	Ernie DiGregorio	Buffalo Braves	$500,000
1974–75	Ernie DiGregorio Kareem Abdul-Jabbar	Buffalo Braves Milwaukee Bucks	$500,000
1975–76	Kareem Abdul-Jabbar	Los Angeles Lakers	$650,000
1976–77	Kareem Abdul-Jabbar	Los Angeles Lakers	$650,000
1977–78	Kareem Abdul-Jabbar	Los Angeles Lakers	$650,000
1978–79	David Thompson	Denver Nuggets	$800,000
1979–80	Moses Malone Bill Walton	Philadelphia 76ers San Diego Clippers	$1,000,000
1980–81	Julius Erving Moses Malone Bill Walton Kareem Abdul-Jabbar	Philadelphia 76ers Philadelphia 76ers San Diego Clippers Los Angeles Lakers	$1,000,000
1981–82	Otis Birdsong Julius Erving Moses Malone Bill Walton Kareem Abdul-Jabbar	New Jersey Nets Philadelphia 76ers Philadelphia 76ers San Diego Clippers Los Angeles Lakers	$1,000,000
1982–83	Moses Malone	Philadelphia 76ers	$2,200,000
1983–84	Moses Malone	Philadelphia 76ers	$2,200,000
1984–85	Magic Johnson	Los Angeles Lakers	$2,500,000
1985–86	Magic Johnson	Los Angeles Lakers	$2,500,000
1986–87	Magic Johnson	Los Angeles Lakers	$2,500,000
1987–88	Patrick Ewing	New York Knicks	$2,750,000
1988–89	Patrick Ewing	New York Knicks	$3,250,000
1989–90	Patrick Ewing	New York Knicks	$3,750,000
1990–91	Patrick Ewing	New York Knicks	$4,250,000
1991–92	Larry Bird	Boston Celtics	$7,070,000
1992–93	David Robinson	San Antonio Spurs	$5,720,000
1993–94	David Robinson	San Antonio Spurs	$5,740,000
1994–95	Magic Johnson	Los Angeles Lakers	$14,660,000
1995–96	Patrick Ewing	New York Knicks	$18,724,000
1996–97	Michael Jordan	Chicago Bulls	$30,140,000
1997–98	Michael Jordan	Chicago Bulls	$33,140,000
1998–99	Patrick Ewing	New York Knicks	$18,500,000
1999–00	Shaquille O'Neal	Los Angeles Lakers	$17,142,000
2000–01	Kevin Garnett	Minnesota Timberwolves	$19,600,000
2001–02	Kevin Garnett	Minnesota Timberwolves	$22,400,000
2002–03	Kevin Garnett	Minnesota Timberwolves	$25,200,000
2003–04	Kevin Garnett	Minnesota Timberwolves	$28,000,000
2004–05	Shaquille O'Neal	Miami Heat	$27,696,430
2005–06	Shaquille O'Neal	Miami Heat	$20,000,000
2006–07	Kevin Garnett	Minnesota Timberwolves	$21,000,000
2007–08	Kevin Garnett	Boston Celtics	$23,751,934
2008–09	Kevin Garnett	Boston Celtics	$24,751,934
2009–10	Kobe Bryant	Los Angeles Lakers	$23,034,375
2010–11	Kobe Bryant	Los Angeles Lakers	$24,806,250
2011–12	Kobe Bryant	Los Angeles Lakers	$25,244,493
2012–13	Kobe Bryant	Los Angeles Lakers	$30,453,805
2013–14	Kobe Bryant	Los Angeles Lakers	$30,453,805
2014–15	Kobe Bryant	Los Angeles Lakers	$23,500,000
2015–16	Kobe Bryant	Los Angeles Lakers	$25,000,000
2016–17	LeBron James	Cleveland Cavaliers	$30,963,450
2017–18	Stephen Curry	Golden State Warriors	$34,682,550
2018–19	Stephen Curry	Golden State Warriors	$37,457,154
2019–20	Stephen Curry	Golden State Warriors	$40,231,758
2020–21	Stephen Curry	Golden State Warriors	$43,006,362
2021–22	Stephen Curry	Golden State Warriors	$45,780,966
2022–23	Stephen Curry	Golden State Warriors	$48,070,014
2023–24	Stephen Curry	Golden State Warriors	$51,915,615
2024–25	Stephen Curry	Golden State Warriors	$55,761,216
2025–26	Stephen Curry	Golden State Warriors	$59,606,817
Upcoming Seasons (including Player Options)
2026–27	Stephen Curry	Golden State Warriors	$62,587,158
2027–28	Nikola Jokić	Denver Nuggets	$62,841,702
2028–29	Joel Embiid	Philadelphia 76ers	$67,396,000
2029–30	Jayson Tatum	Boston Celtics	$71,446,914
2030–31	Shai Gilgeous-Alexander	Oklahoma City Thunder	$75,646,200

== Highest career earners ==
Rank	Player	Start	End	Salary
1	LeBron James	2003–04	Present	$581,375,548
2	Kevin Durant	2007–08	Present	$501,135,653
3	Stephen Curry	2009–10	Present	$470,141,507
4	James Harden	2009–10	Present	$411,406,674
5	Paul George	2010–11	Present	$406,203,976
6	Chris Paul	2005–06	Present	$404,526,572
7	Kawhi Leonard	2011–12	Present	$375,772,011
8	Jimmy Butler	2011–12	Present	$366,174,318
9	Damian Lillard	2012–13	Present	$365,371,691
10	Anthony Davis	2012–13	Present	$364,454,284
Updated through the 2025–26 NBA season

Rank	Player	Start	End	Salary
1	Kevin Durant	2007–08	Present	$591,135,653
2	LeBron James	2003–04	Present	$581,375,548
3	Stephen Curry	2009–10	Present	$532,728,665
4	Devin Booker	2015–16	Present	$520,335,108
5	Paul George	2010–11	Present	$516,917,026
6	Joel Embiid	2014–15	Present	$509,313,851
7	Anthony Davis	2012–13	Present	$485,697,532
8	Damian Lillard	2012–13	Present	$482,940,103
9	Shai Gilgeous-Alexander	2018–19	Present	$469,632,400
10	Jayson Tatum	2017–18	Present	$469,471,035
Updated through end of All Current Contracts, as of 2025–26 NBA season

== 2020s ==
=== 2026–2027 ===
Player	Salary	Team
Stephen Curry	$62,587,158	Golden State Warriors
Nikola Jokić	$59,033,114	Denver Nuggets
Giannis Antetokounmpo	$58,456,566	Miami Heat
Anthony Davis	$58,456,566	Washington Wizards
Jayson Tatum	$58,456,566	Boston Celtics
Joel Embiid	$57,985,752	Philadelphia 76ers
Devin Booker	$57,078,728	Phoenix Suns
Jaylen Brown	$57,078,728	Philadelphia 76ers
Karl-Anthony Towns	$57,078,728	New York Knicks
Jimmy Butler	$56,832,773	Golden State Warriors

=== 2025–2026 ===
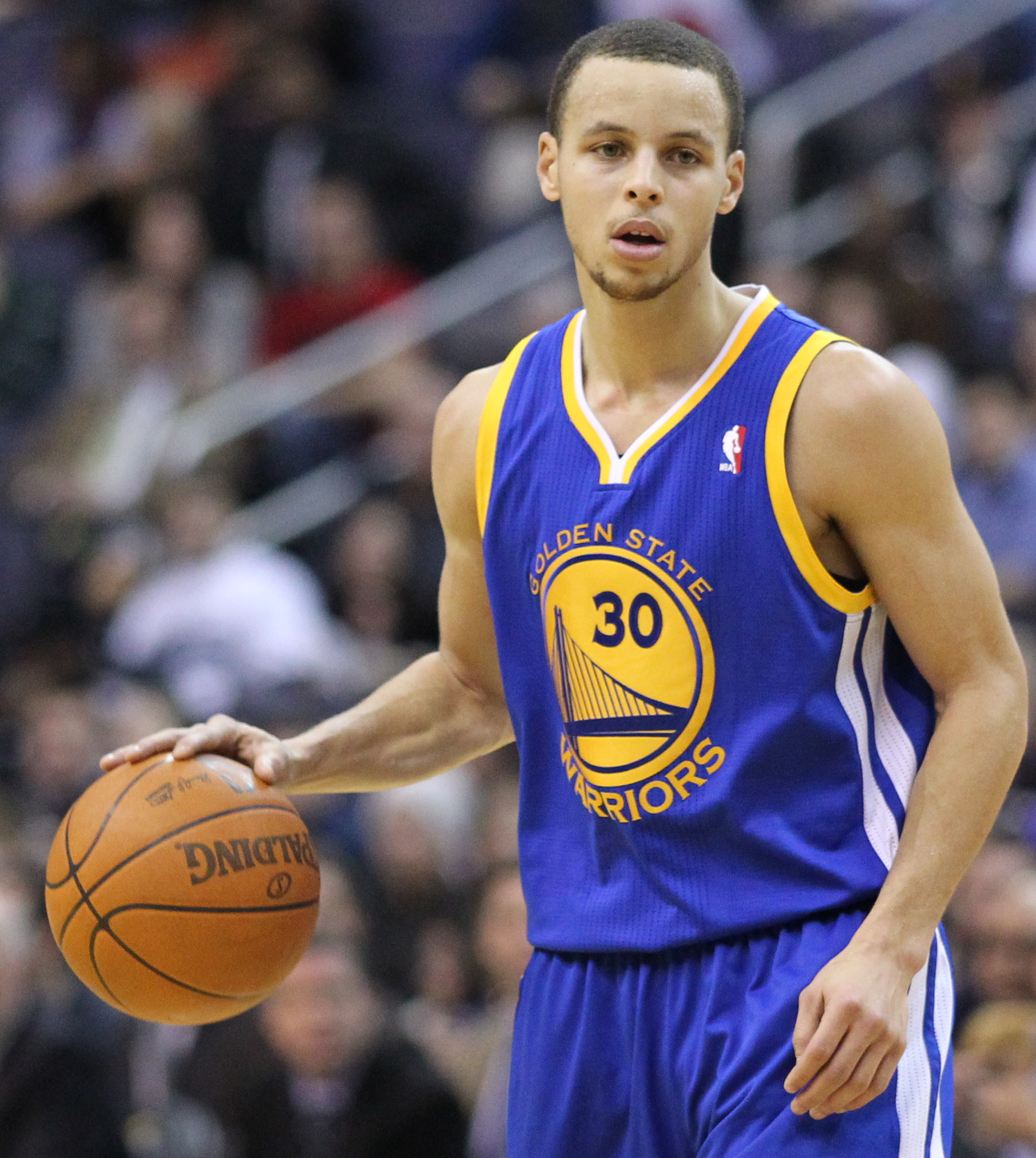
Stephen Curry has served as the highest-paid NBA player since the 2017–18 NBA season and became the first player to sign a contract with earnings of over $40 million, $50 million and $60 million in a season.

Player	Salary	Team
Stephen Curry	$59,606,817	Golden State Warriors
Joel Embiid	$55,224,526	Philadelphia 76ers
Nikola Jokić	$55,224,526	Denver Nuggets
Giannis Antetokounmpo	$54,126,450	Milwaukee Bucks
Jimmy Butler	$54,126,450	Golden State Warriors
Anthony Davis	$54,126,450	Dallas Mavericks/Washington Wizards
Jayson Tatum	$54,126,450	Boston Celtics
Kevin Durant	$53,282,608	Houston Rockets
Devin Booker	$53,142,264	Phoenix Suns
Jaylen Brown	$53,142,264	Boston Celtics
Karl-Anthony Towns	$53,142,264	New York Knicks

=== 2024–2025 ===
Player	Salary	Team
Stephen Curry	$55,761,216	Golden State Warriors
Joel Embiid	$51,415,938	Philadelphia 76ers
Nikola Jokić	$51,415,938	Denver Nuggets
Kevin Durant	$51,179,021	Phoenix Suns
Bradley Beal	$50,203,930	Phoenix Suns
Devin Booker	$49,205,800	Phoenix Suns
Jaylen Brown	$49,205,800	Boston Celtics
Paul George	$49,205,800	Philadelphia 76ers
Kawhi Leonard	$49,205,800	Los Angeles Clippers
Karl-Anthony Towns	$49,205,800	New York Knicks

=== 2023–2024 ===
Player	Salary	Team
Stephen Curry	$51,915,615	Golden State Warriors
Kevin Durant	$47,649,433	Phoenix Suns
Joel Embiid	$47,607,350	Philadelphia 76ers
LeBron James	$47,607,350	Los Angeles Lakers
Nikola Jokić	$47,607,350	Denver Nuggets
Bradley Beal	$46,741,590	Phoenix Suns
Giannis Antetokounmpo	$45,640,084	Milwaukee Bucks
Paul George	$45,640,084	Los Angeles Clippers
Kawhi Leonard	$45,640,084	Los Angeles Clippers
Damian Lillard	$45,640,084	Milwaukee Bucks

=== 2022–2023 ===
Player	Salary	Team
Stephen Curry	$48,070,014	Golden State Warriors
LeBron James	$44,474,988	Los Angeles Lakers
Kevin Durant	$44,124,845	Brooklyn Nets/Phoenix Suns
Bradley Beal	$43,279,250	Washington Wizards
Giannis Antetokounmpo	$42,492,492	Milwaukee Bucks
Paul George	$42,492,492	Los Angeles Clippers
Kawhi Leonard	$42,492,492	Los Angeles Clippers
Damian Lillard	$42,492,492	Portland Trail Blazers
Klay Thompson	$40,600,080	Golden State Warriors
Kyrie Irving	$39,060,807	Brooklyn Nets/Dallas Mavericks

=== 2021–2022 ===
Player	Salary	Team
Stephen Curry	$45,780,966	Golden State Warriors
James Harden	$44,310,840	Brooklyn Nets/Philadelphia 76ers
John Wall	$44,310,840	Houston Rockets
Russell Westbrook	$44,211,146	Los Angeles Lakers
Kevin Durant	$42,018,900	Brooklyn Nets
LeBron James	$41,180,544	Los Angeles Lakers
Giannis Antetokounmpo	$39,344,900	Milwaukee Bucks
Paul George	$39,344,900	Los Angeles Clippers
Kawhi Leonard	$39,344,900	Los Angeles Clippers
Damian Lillard	$39,344,900	Portland Trail Blazers

=== 2020–2021 ===
Player	Salary	Team
Stephen Curry	$43,006,362	Golden State Warriors
Chris Paul	$41,358,814	Phoenix Suns
Russell Westbrook	$41,358,814	Washington Wizards
James Harden	$41,254,920	Houston Rockets/Brooklyn Nets
John Wall	$41,254,920	Houston Rockets
Kevin Durant	$40,108,950	Brooklyn Nets
LeBron James	$39,219,566	Los Angeles Lakers
Paul George	$35,450,412	Los Angeles Clippers
Klay Thompson	$35,361,360	Golden State Warriors
Mike Conley	$34,502,132	Utah Jazz

=== 2019–2020 ===
Player	Salary	Team
Stephen Curry	$40,231,758	Golden State Warriors
Chris Paul	$38,506,482	Oklahoma City Thunder
Russell Westbrook	$38,506,482	Houston Rockets
Kevin Durant	$38,199,000	Brooklyn Nets
James Harden	$38,199,000	Houston Rockets
John Wall	$38,199,000	Washington Wizards
LeBron James	$37,436,858	Los Angeles Lakers
Kyle Lowry	$34,996,296	Toronto Raptors
Blake Griffin	$34,449,964	Detroit Pistons
Paul George	$33,005,556	Los Angeles Clippers

== 2010s ==
=== 2018–2019 ===
Player	Salary	Team
Stephen Curry	$37,457,154	Golden State Warriors
Russell Westbrook	$35,665,000	Oklahoma City Thunder
Chris Paul	$35,654,150	Houston Rockets
LeBron James	$35,654,150	Los Angeles Lakers
Kyle Lowry	$32,700,000	Toronto Raptors
Blake Griffin	$31,873,932	Detroit Pistons
Gordon Hayward	$31,214,295	Boston Celtics
James Harden	$30,570,000	Houston Rockets
Paul George	$30,560,700	Oklahoma City Thunder
Mike Conley Jr.	$30,521,115	Memphis Grizzlies

=== 2017–2018 ===
Player	Salary	Team
Stephen Curry	$34,682,550	Golden State Warriors
LeBron James	$33,285,709	Cleveland Cavaliers
Paul Millsap	$30,769,231	Denver Nuggets
Gordon Hayward	$29,727,900	Boston Celtics
Blake Griffin	$29,512,900	Los Angeles Clippers/Detroit Pistons
Kyle Lowry	$28,903,704	Toronto Raptors
Mike Conley Jr.	$28,530,608	Memphis Grizzlies
Russell Westbrook	$28,299,399	Oklahoma City Thunder
James Harden	$28,299,399	Houston Rockets
DeMar DeRozan	$27,739,975	Toronto Raptors

=== 2016–2017 ===
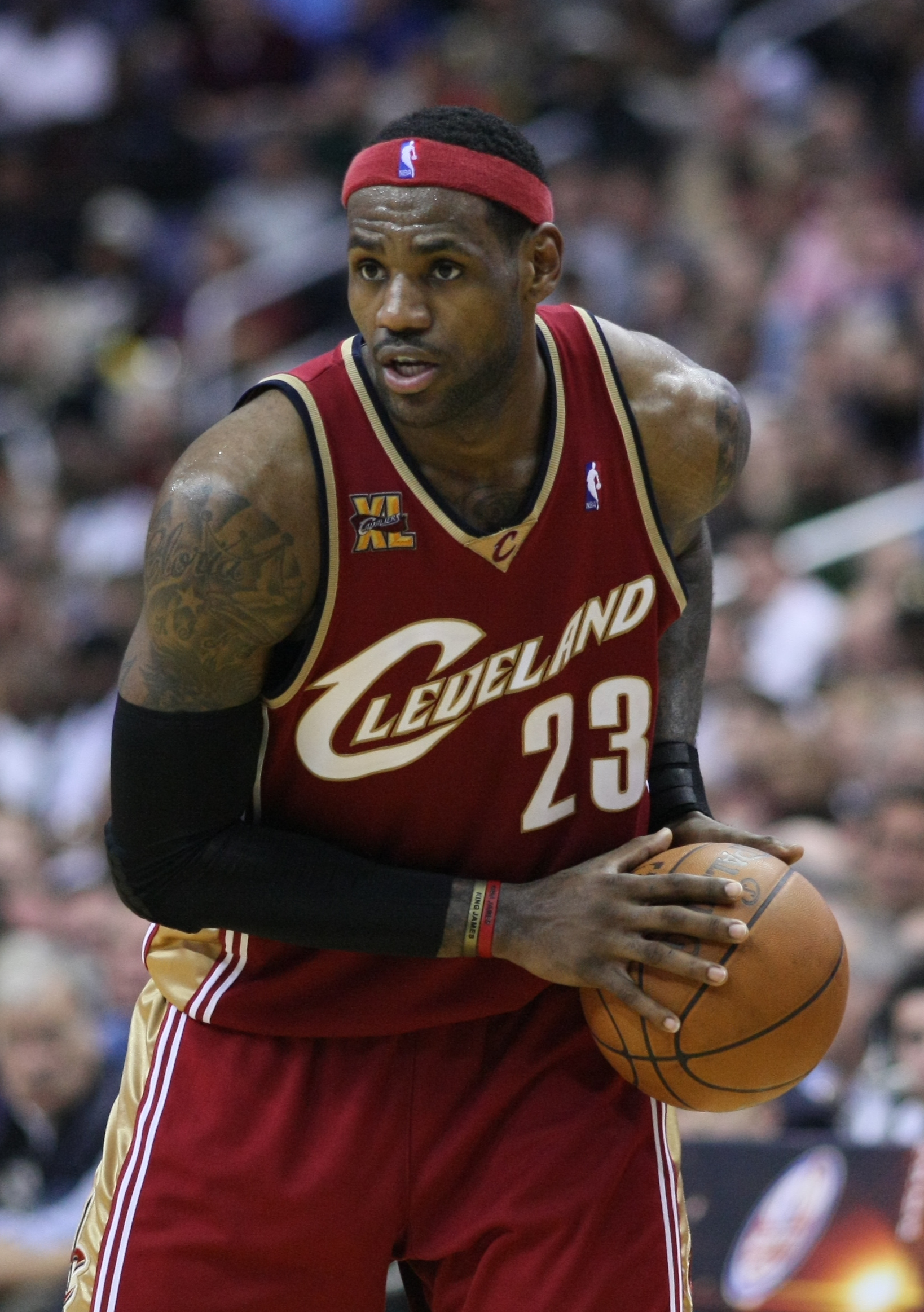
LeBron James became the third player to sign a contract worth over $30 million in a season, after Michael Jordan and Kobe Bryant.

Player	Salary	Team
LeBron James	$30,963,450	Cleveland Cavaliers
Al Horford	$26,540,100	Boston Celtics
DeMar DeRozan	$26,540,100	Toronto Raptors
James Harden	$26,540,100	Houston Rockets
Kevin Durant	$26,540,100	Golden State Warriors
Russell Westbrook	$26,540,100	Oklahoma City Thunder
Mike Conley Jr.	$26,540,100	Memphis Grizzlies
Dirk Nowitzki	$25,000,000	Dallas Mavericks
Carmelo Anthony	$24,559,380	New York Knicks
Damian Lillard	$24,328,425	Portland Trail Blazers

=== 2015–2016 ===
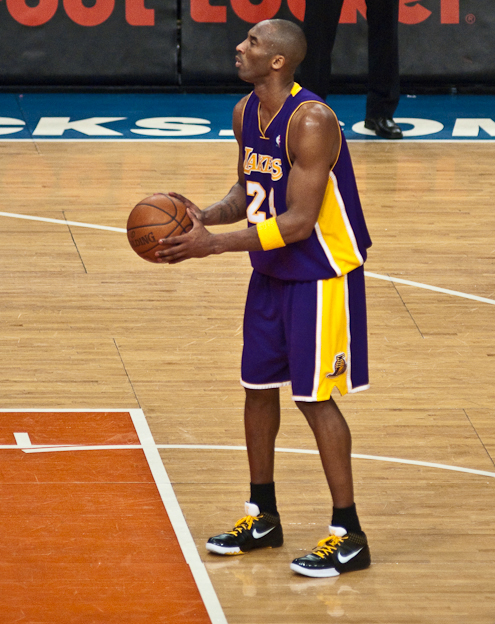
Kobe Bryant, who spent his entire 20 years career in a Los Angeles Lakers uniform, was the highest-paid player in the league from the 2009–10 NBA season until his retirement at the conclusion of the 2015–16 NBA season.

Player	Salary	Team
Kobe Bryant	$25,000,000	Los Angeles Lakers
LeBron James	$22,970,500	Cleveland Cavaliers
Carmelo Anthony	$22,875,000	New York Knicks
Dwight Howard	$22,359,364	Houston Rockets
Chris Bosh	$22,192,730	Miami Heat
Chris Paul	$21,468,695	Los Angeles Clippers
Kevin Durant	$20,158,622	Oklahoma City Thunder
Derrick Rose	$20,093,064	Chicago Bulls
Dwyane Wade	$20,000,000	Miami Heat
LaMarcus Aldridge	$19,689,000	San Antonio Spurs

=== 2014–2015 ===
Player	Salary	Team
Kobe Bryant	$23,500,000	Los Angeles Lakers
Amar'e Stoudemire	$23,410,988	New York Knicks
Joe Johnson	$23,180,790	Brooklyn Nets
Carmelo Anthony	$22,458,401	New York Knicks
Dwight Howard	$21,436,271	Houston Rockets
Chris Bosh	$20,644,400	Miami Heat
LeBron James	$20,644,400	Cleveland Cavaliers
Chris Paul	$20,068,563	Los Angeles Clippers
Deron Williams	$19,754,465	Brooklyn Nets
Rudy Gay	$19,317,326	Sacramento Kings

=== 2013–2014 ===
Player	Salary	Team
Kobe Bryant	$30,453,805	Los Angeles Lakers
Dirk Nowitzki	$22,721,381	Dallas Mavericks
Amar'e Stoudemire	$21,679,893	New York Knicks
Joe Johnson	$21,466,718	Brooklyn Nets
Carmelo Anthony	$21,388,953	New York Knicks
Dwight Howard	$20,513,178	Houston Rockets
Pau Gasol	$19,285,850	Los Angeles Lakers
Chris Bosh	$19,067,500	Miami Heat
LeBron James	$19,067,500	Miami Heat
Dwyane Wade	$18,673,000	Miami Heat

=== 2012–2013 ===
Player	Salary	Team
Kobe Bryant	$30,453,805	Los Angeles Lakers
Dirk Nowitzki	$20,907,128	Dallas Mavericks
Amar'e Stoudemire	$19,948,799	New York Knicks
Joe Johnson	$19,752,645	Brooklyn Nets
Carmelo Anthony	$19,444,503	New York Knicks
Pau Gasol	$19,285,850	Los Angeles Lakers
Chris Bosh	$19,067,500	Miami Heat
LeBron James	$19,067,500	Miami Heat
Dwyane Wade	$18,673,000	Miami Heat
Chris Paul	$18,668,431	Los Angeles Clippers

=== 2011–2012 ===
Player	Salary	Team
Kobe Bryant	$25,244,493	Los Angeles Lakers
Kevin Garnett	$21,247,044	Boston Celtics
Tim Duncan	$21,164,619	San Antonio Spurs
Rashard Lewis	$21,136,631	Washington Wizards
Dirk Nowitzki	$19,092,873	Dallas Mavericks
Pau Gasol	$18,714,150	Los Angeles Lakers
Carmelo Anthony	$18,518,574	New York Knicks
Amar'e Stoudemire	$18,217,705	New York Knicks
Elton Brand	$18,160,355	Philadelphia 76ers
Dwight Howard	$18,091,770	Orlando Magic

=== 2010–2011 ===
Player	Salary	Team
Kobe Bryant	$24,806,250	Los Angeles Lakers
Rashard Lewis	$19,573,711	Washington Wizards
Tim Duncan	$18,835,381	San Antonio Spurs
Kevin Garnett	$18,832,044	Boston Celtics
Michael Redd	$18,300,000	Milwaukee Bucks
Andrei Kirilenko	$17,823,000	Utah Jazz
Pau Gasol	$17,823,000	Los Angeles Lakers
Gilbert Arenas	$17,730,694	Washington Wizards
Yao Ming	$17,686,100	Houston Rockets
Zach Randolph	$17,666,666	Memphis Grizzlies

=== 2009–2010 ===
Player	Salary	Team
Kobe Bryant	$23,034,375	Los Angeles Lakers
Jermaine O'Neal	$23,016,000	Miami Heat
Tracy McGrady	$22,843,124	New York Knicks
Tim Duncan	$22,183,220	San Antonio Spurs
Shaquille O'Neal	$21,000,000	Cleveland Cavaliers
Dirk Nowitzki	$19,795,714	Dallas Mavericks
Paul Pierce	$19,795,712	Boston Celtics
Ray Allen	$18,776,860	Boston Celtics
Rashard Lewis	$18,010,791	Orlando Magic
Michael Redd	$17,040,000	Milwaukee Bucks

== 2000s ==
=== 2008–2009 ===
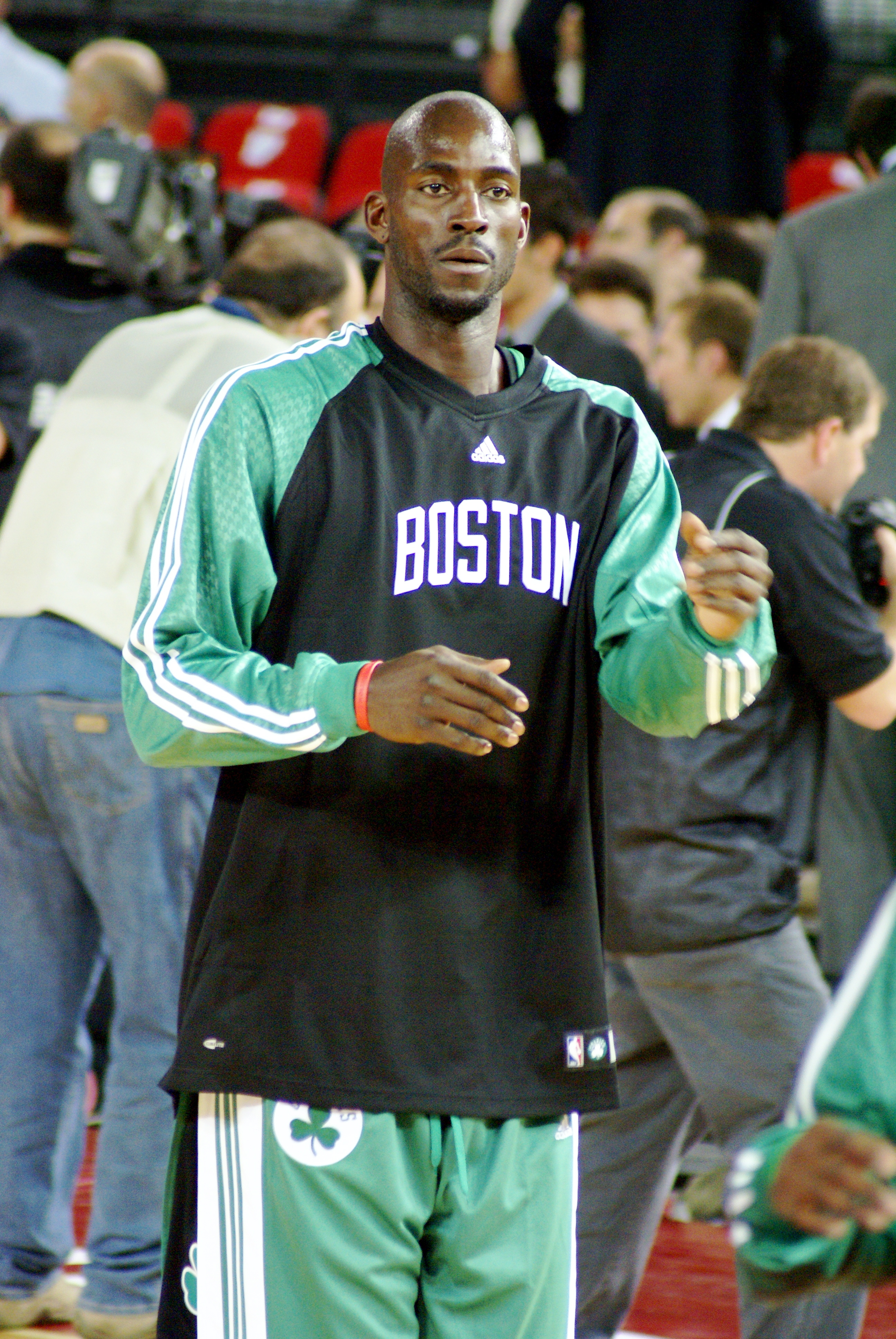
Kevin Garnett was the highest-paid player during the 2008–09 NBA season, 2007–08 NBA season and 2006–07 NBA season; he relinquished that position to Shaquille O'Neal for two seasons, but was also the highest-paid player during the 2003–04 NBA season, 2002–03 NBA season, 2001–02 NBA season and 2000–01 NBA season.

Player	Salary	Team
Kevin Garnett	$24,751,934	Boston Celtics
Jason Kidd	$21,372,000	Dallas Mavericks
Jermaine O'Neal	$21,372,000	Toronto Raptors
Kobe Bryant	$21,262,500	Los Angeles Lakers
Shaquille O'Neal	$21,000,000	Phoenix Suns
Allen Iverson	$20,840,625	Detroit Pistons
Stephon Marbury	$20,840,625	Boston Celtics
Tim Duncan	$20,598,704	San Antonio Spurs
Tracy McGrady	$20,370,437	Houston Rockets
Ray Allen	$18,388,430	Boston Celtics

=== 2007–2008 ===
Player	Salary	Team
Kevin Garnett	$23,751,934	Boston Celtics
Shaquille O'Neal	$21,000,000	Phoenix Suns
Jason Kidd	$19,728,000	New Jersey Nets
Jermaine O'Neal	$19,728,000	Indiana Pacers
Kobe Bryant	$19,490,625	Los Angeles Lakers
Tim Duncan	$19,014,188	San Antonio Spurs
Allen Iverson	$19,012,500	Denver Nuggets
Stephon Marbury	$19,012,500	New York Knicks
Tracy McGrady	$18,257,750	Houston Rockets
Baron Davis	$16,440,000	Golden State Warriors

=== 2006–2007 ===
Player	Salary	Team
Kevin Garnett	$21,000,000	Minnesota Timberwolves
Shaquille O'Neal	$20,000,000	Miami Heat
Jason Kidd	$18,084,000	New Jersey Nets
Jermaine O'Neal	$18,084,000	Indiana Pacers
Kobe Bryant	$17,718,750	Los Angeles Lakers
Tim Duncan	$17,429,673	San Antonio Spurs
Allen Iverson	$17,184,375	Philadelphia 76ers
Stephon Marbury	$17,184,375	New York Knicks
Tracy McGrady	$16,901,500	Houston Rockets
Grant Hill	$16,901,500	Orlando Magic

=== 2005–2006 ===
Player	Salary	Team
Shaquille O'Neal	$20,000,000	Miami Heat
Allan Houston	$19,125,000	New York Knicks
Chris Webber	$19,125,000	Philadelphia 76ers
Kevin Garnett	$18,000,000	Minnesota Timberwolves
Allen Iverson	$16,453,125	Philadelphia 76ers
Stephon Marbury	$16,453,125	New York Knicks
Jason Kidd	$16,440,000	New Jersey Nets
Jermaine O'Neal	$16,440,000	Indiana Pacers
Kobe Bryant	$15,946,875	Los Angeles Lakers
Michael Finley	$15,937,500	Dallas Mavericks

=== 2004–2005 ===
Player	Salary	Team
Shaquille O'Neal	$27,696,430	Miami Heat
Dikembe Mutombo	$19,485,719	New Jersey Nets/Houston Rockets
Allan Houston	$17,531,250	New York Knicks
Chris Webber	$17,531,250	Sacramento Kings
Kevin Garnett	$16,000,000	Minnesota Timberwolves
Jason Kidd	$14,796,000	New Jersey Nets
Jermaine O'Neal	$14,796,000	Indiana Pacers
Shareef Abdur-Rahim	$14,625,000	Portland Trail Blazers
Ray Allen	$14,625,000	Seattle SuperSonics
Penny Hardaway	$14,625,000	New York Knicks
Zydrunas Ilgauskas	$14,625,000	Cleveland Cavaliers
Allen Iverson	$14,625,000	Philadelphia 76ers
Stephon Marbury	$14,625,000	New York Knicks
Latrell Sprewell	$14,625,000	Minnesota Timberwolves
Antoine Walker	$14,625,000	Atlanta Hawks

=== 2003–2004 ===
Player	Salary	Team
Kevin Garnett	$28,000,000	Minnesota Timberwolves
Shaquille O'Neal	$26,571,000	Los Angeles Lakers
Rasheed Wallace	$18,000,000	Portland Trail Blazers
Dikembe Mutombo	$17,895,000	New York Knicks
Allan Houston	$15,937,000	New York Knicks
Chris Webber	$15,937,000	Sacramento Kings
Damon Stoudamire	$14,625,000	Portland Trail Blazers
Penny Hardaway	$13,500,000	Phoenix Suns
Latrell Sprewell	$13,500,000	Minnesota Timberwolves
Antonio McDyess	$13,500,000	Phoenix Suns

=== 2002–2003 ===
Player	Salary	Team
Kevin Garnett	$25,200,000	Minnesota Timberwolves
Shaquille O'Neal	$23,571,000	Los Angeles Lakers
Shawn Kemp	$21,500,000	Orlando Magic
Juwan Howard	$20,625,000	Denver Nuggets
Scottie Pippen	$19,727,000	Portland Trail Blazers
Karl Malone	$19,250,000	Utah Jazz
Rasheed Wallace	$16,200,000	Portland Trail Blazers
Dikembe Mutombo	$16,105,000	New Jersey Nets
Chris Webber	$14,343,000	Sacramento Kings
Damon Stoudamire	$13,500,000	Portland Trail Blazers

=== 2001–2002 ===
Player	Salary	Team
Kevin Garnett	$22,400,000	Minnesota Timberwolves
Shaquille O'Neal	$21,428,000	Los Angeles Lakers
Alonzo Mourning	$18,756,000	Miami Heat
Juwan Howard	$18,750,000	Denver Nuggets
Scottie Pippen	$18,083,000	Portland Trail Blazers
Karl Malone	$17,500,000	Utah Jazz
Rasheed Wallace	$14,400,000	Portland Trail Blazers
Dikembe Mutombo	$14,315,000	Philadelphia 76ers
Gary Payton	$12,926,000	Seattle SuperSonics
Shawn Kemp	$12,770,000	Portland Trail Blazers

=== 2000–2001 ===
Player	Salary	Team
Kevin Garnett	$19,600,000	Minnesota Timberwolves
Shaquille O'Neal	$19,285,000	Los Angeles Lakers
Alonzo Mourning	$16,879,000	Miami Heat
Juwan Howard	$16,875,000	Washington Wizards
Hakeem Olajuwon	$16,685,000	Houston Rockets
Karl Malone	$15,750,000	Utah Jazz
Dikembe Mutombo	$14,422,000	Philadelphia 76ers
Patrick Ewing	$14,000,000	Seattle SuperSonics
David Robinson	$13,196,000	San Antonio Spurs
Scottie Pippen	$13,151,000	Portland Trail Blazers

=== 1999–2000 ===
Player	Salary	Team
Shaquille O'Neal	$17,142,000	Los Angeles Lakers
Kevin Garnett	$16,806,000	Minnesota Timberwolves
Alonzo Mourning	$15,004,000	Miami Heat
Juwan Howard	$15,000,000	Washington Wizards
Scottie Pippen	$14,795,000	Portland Trail Blazers
Karl Malone	$14,000,000	Utah Jazz
Larry Johnson	$11,910,000	New York Knicks
Gary Payton	$11,020,000	Seattle SuperSonics
Rasheed Wallace	$10,800,000	Portland Trail Blazers
Shawn Kemp	$10,780,000	Cleveland Cavaliers

== 1990s ==
=== 1998–1999 ===
Player	Salary	Team
Patrick Ewing	$18,500,000	New York Knicks
Shaquille O'Neal	$17,000,000	Los Angeles Lakers
David Robinson	$14,841,000	San Antonio Spurs
Kevin Garnett	$14,000,000	Minnesota Timberwolves
Alonzo Mourning	$13,130,000	Miami Heat
Juwan Howard	$13,125,000	Washington Wizards
Hakeem Olajuwon	$12,943,000	Houston Rockets
Dikembe Mutombo	$11,218,000	Atlanta Hawks
Jayson Williams	$11,000,000	New Jersey Nets
Scottie Pippen	$11,000,000	Houston Rockets

=== 1997-1998 ===
Player	Salary	Team
Michael Jordan	$33,140,000	Chicago Bulls
Patrick Ewing	$20,500,000	New York Knicks
Horace Grant	$14,285,714	Orlando Magic
Shaquille O'Neal	$12,857,143	Los Angeles Lakers
David Robinson	$12,397,440	San Antonio Spurs
Alonzo Mourning	$11,254,800	Miami Heat
Juwan Howard	$11,250,000	Washington Wizards
Hakeem Olajuwon	$11,156,000	Houston Rockets
Gary Payton	$10,514,688	Seattle SuperSonics
Dikembe Mutombo	$9,615,187	Atlanta Hawks

=== 1996-1997 ===
Player	Salary	Team
Michael Jordan	$30,140,000	Chicago Bulls
Horace Grant	$14,857,000	Orlando Magic
Reggie Miller	$11,250,000	Indiana Pacers
Shaquille O'Neal	$10,714,000	Los Angeles Lakers
Gary Payton	$10,212,000	Seattle SuperSonics
David Robinson	$9,952,000	San Antonio Spurs
Juwan Howard	$9,750,000	Washington Wizards
Hakeem Olajuwon	$9,655,000	Houston Rockets
Alonzo Mourning	$9,380,000	Miami Heat
Dennis Rodman	$9,000,000	Chicago Bulls

=== 1995-1996 ===
Player	Salary	Team
Patrick Ewing	$18,724,000	New York Knicks
Clyde Drexler	$9,810,000	Houston Rockets
David Robinson	$7,700,000	San Antonio Spurs
Chris Webber	$7,000,000	Washington Bullets
Joe Dumars	$6,881,000	Detroit Pistons
Danny Manning	$6,833,000	Phoenix Suns
A.C. Green	$6,473,000	Phoenix Suns
Shaquille O'Neal	$5,700,000	Orlando Magic
Derrick Coleman	$5,476,000	Philadelphia 76ers
Sean Elliott	$5,333,000	San Antonio Spurs

== See also ==
- List of highest paid Major League Baseball players
- List of player salaries in the NHL
- List of salaries
- NBA records
