= List of highest-paid Major League Baseball players =

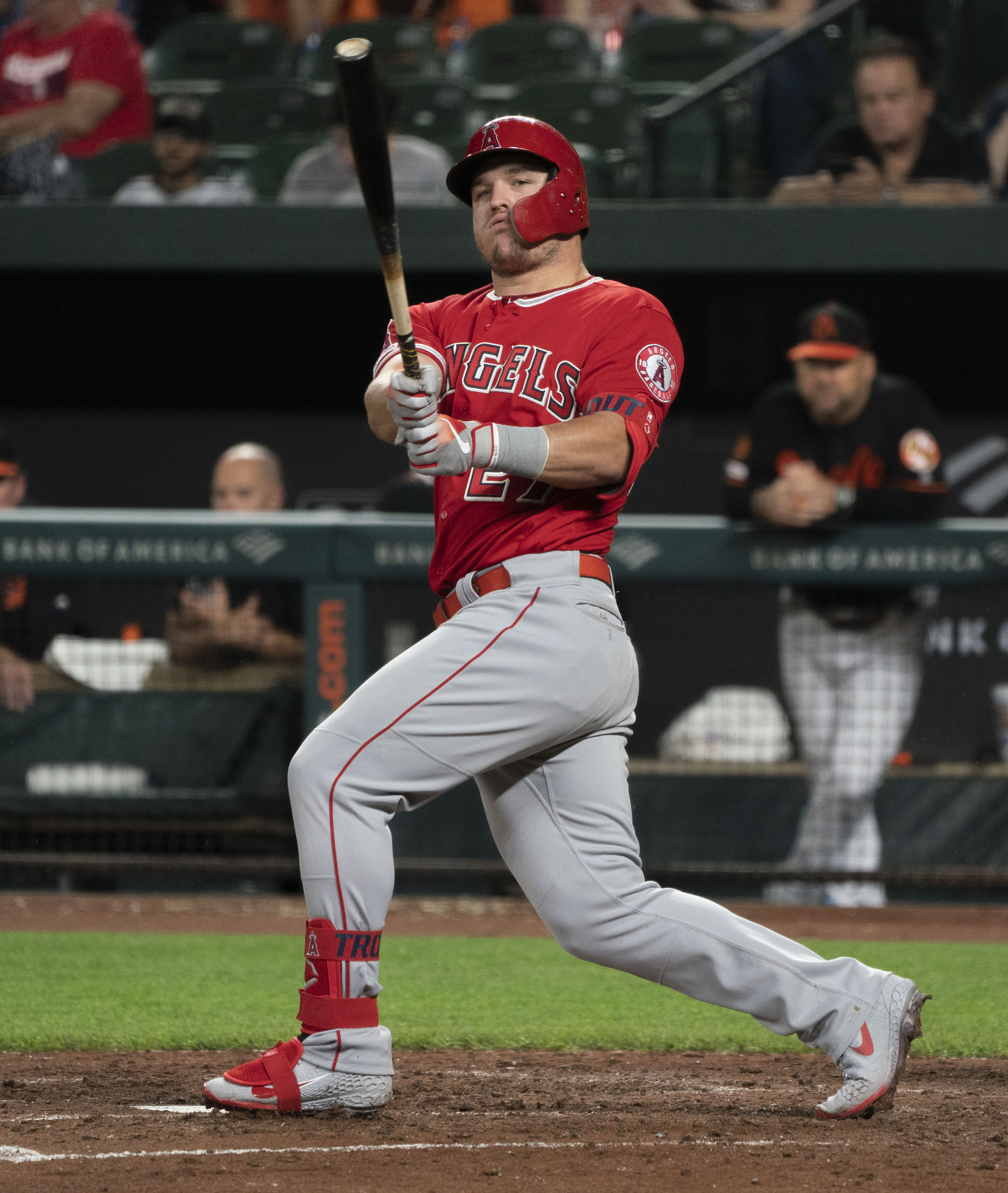
In 2019, Mike Trout signed a 12-year, $426 million contract with the Angels, the richest contract in the history of North American sports at the time.

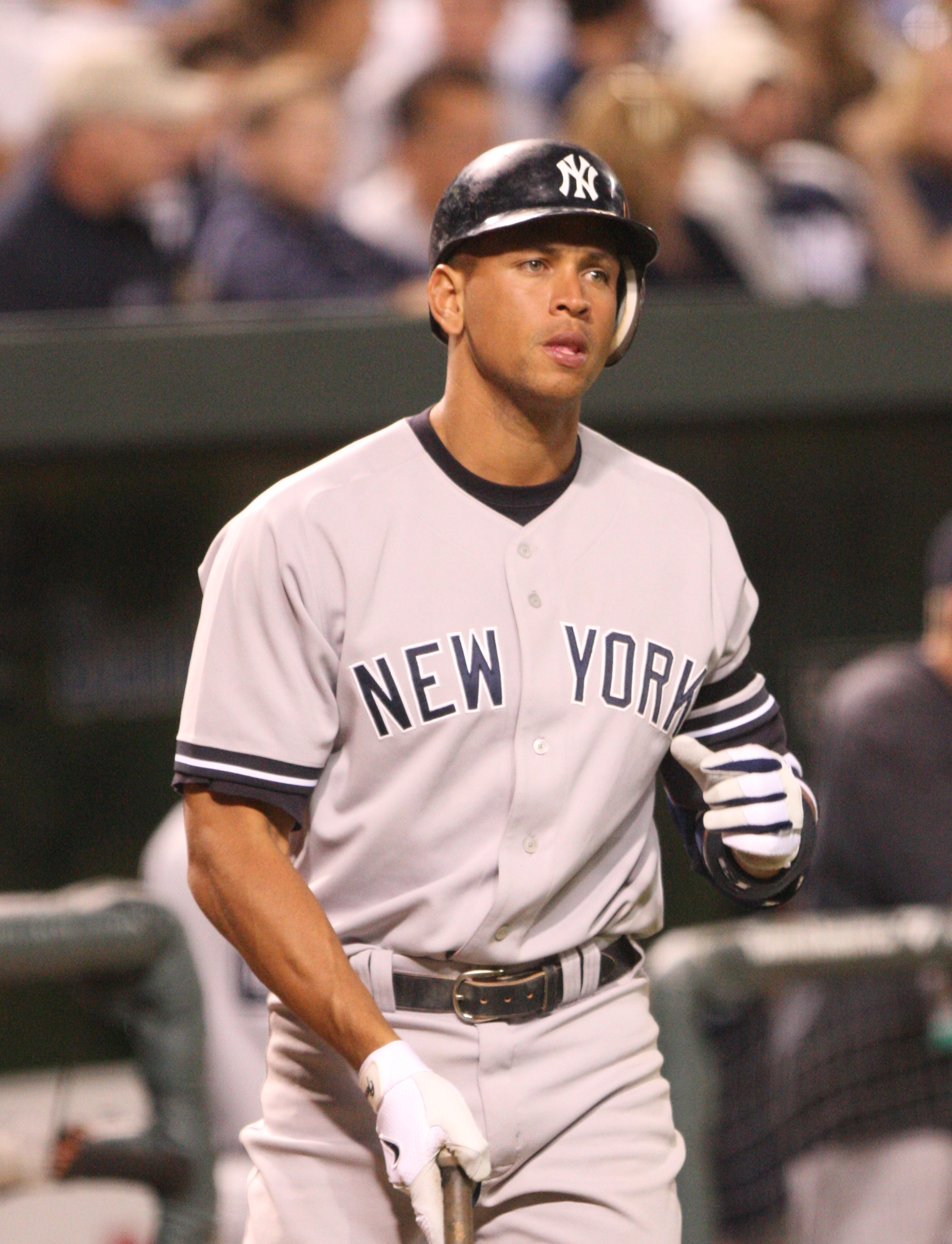
Alex Rodriguez earned the highest salary in MLB in 2013 at $28,000,000. He also has the highest career earnings in MLB history, as well as a record 13 years with the highest AAV.

Major League Baseball (MLB) does not have a hard salary cap, instead employing a luxury tax that applies to teams whose total payroll exceeds certain set thresholds for a given season. Free agency did not exist in MLB prior to the end of the reserve clause in the 1970s, allowing owners before that time to wholly dictate the terms of player negotiations and resulting in significantly lower salaries.

Babe Ruth, widely regarded as one of the greatest baseball players ever, earned an estimated $856,850 ($20,621,950 inflation-adjusted from 1934 dollars) over his entire playing career. When asked whether he thought he deserved to earn $80,000 a year ($1,541,833 inflation-adjusted), while the president, Herbert Hoover, had a $75,000 salary, Ruth famously remarked, "What the hell has Hoover got to do with it? Besides, I had a better year than he did."

Pitcher Nolan Ryan was the first player to earn an annual salary above $1 million, signing a $4.5 million, 4-year contract with the Houston Astros in 1979. Kirby Puckett and Rickey Henderson signed the first contracts which paid an average of $3 million a year in November 1989. In 1990, Jose Canseco signed for 5 years and $23.5 million, making him the first player to earn an average of $4 million a year. It wasn't until 2010 when the average salary for all MLB players exceeded $4 million.

Alex Rodriguez signed two record-breaking contracts during his career. First, he signed a $252 million, 10-year contract with the Texas Rangers in December 2000 ($471,130,435 inflation-adjusted from 2000 dollars). Baseball executive Sandy Alderson called the deal "stupefying," while Sports Illustrated noted that Rodriguez's early salaries under the contract ($21 million) would be greater than the annual payroll of the entire Minnesota Twins team that year ($15.8 million). The deal was the largest sports contract in history, doubling the total value of Kevin Garnett's $126 million National Basketball Association contract (the previous record holder) and more than doubling Mike Hampton's $121 million contract, the previous MLB record which had been signed just days before. The Rangers traded Rodriguez before the 2004 season to the New York Yankees for Alfonso Soriano, though Texas agreed to pay $67 million of the $179 million outstanding on the contract. Rodriguez then opted out of the remainder of his deal after the 2007 season and renegotiated a new $275 million, 10-year agreement with the Yankees, breaking his own record for the largest sports contract.^{[H]}

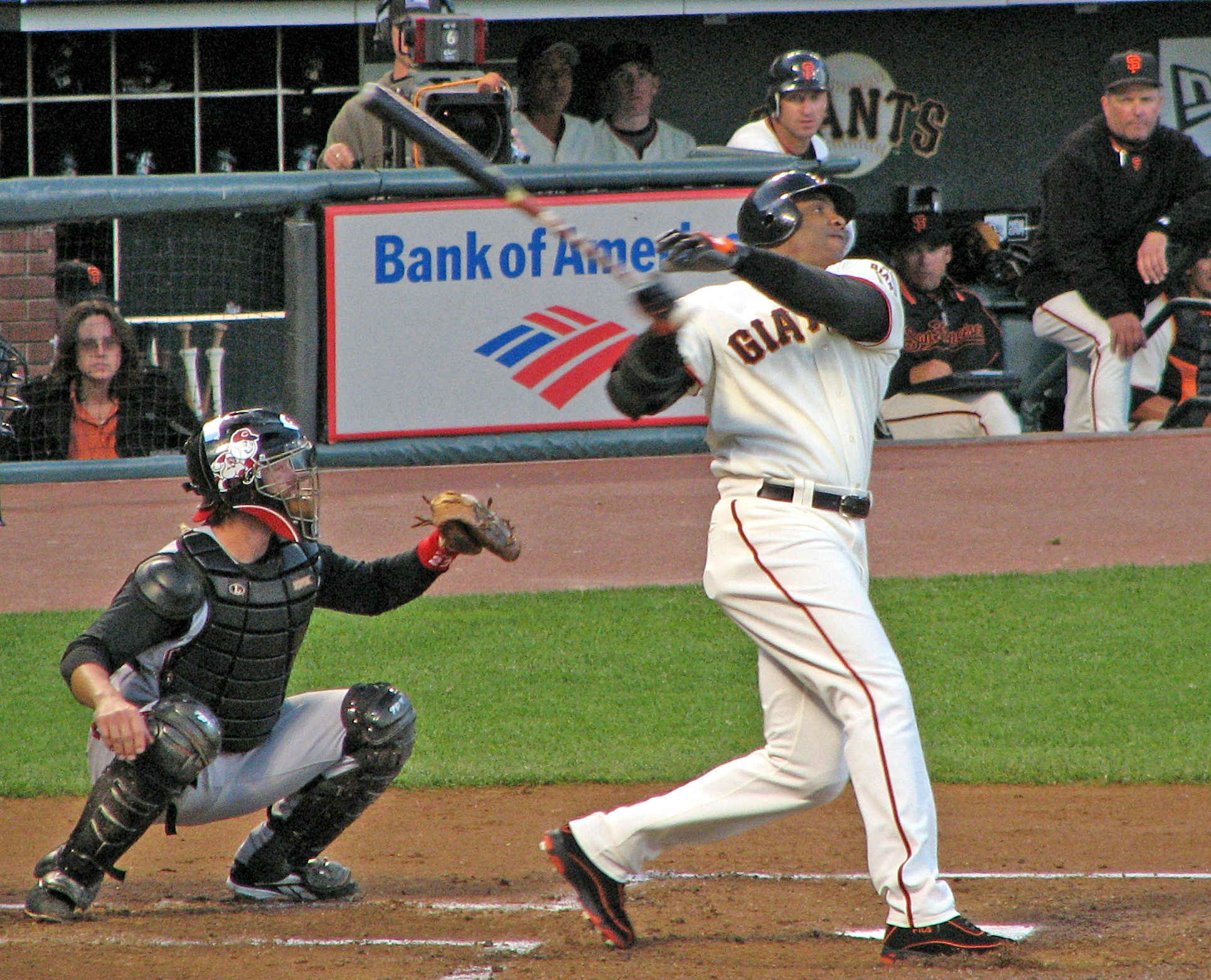
Though retired since 2007, Barry Bonds' career earnings of over $192 million still ranks in the top 50 overall in MLB history.

Five of the 20 highest-paid players in 2013 were members of the Yankees. Their 2013 payroll was $228,835,490, roughly $12 million above the second-largest Los Angeles Dodgers. The Yankees have drawn criticism for their payroll, with some claiming it undermines the parity of MLB. From 2003 to 2024, the Yankees' payroll exceeded the luxury tax threshold every year except 2018 and 2021. Following 2020, the Dodgers and New York Mets have led the majors in payroll. The Dodgers signed Shohei Ohtani to a ten-year, $700 million contract before the 2024 season, though most of that money was deferred. Accounting for net present value, Juan Soto signed a larger contract with the Mets before the 2025 season, a 15-year, $765 million contract with no deferred money.

== Key ==
Key
†	Member of the National Baseball Hall of Fame and Museum
1B	First baseman
2B	Second baseman
3B	Third baseman
SS	Shortstop
LF	Left fielder
CF	Center fielder
RF	Right fielder
C	Catcher
SP	Starting pitcher
RP	Relief pitcher
DH	Designated hitter

== Highest current annual salaries ==
This table refers to the average annual salary for 2026, without considering signing bonuses or deferred payments.

Rank	Name	Position	Team(s)	Salary
1	Shohei Ohtani	DH/SP	Los Angeles Dodgers	$70 million
2	Kyle Tucker	OF	Los Angeles Dodgers	$60 million
3	Juan Soto	OF	New York Mets	$51 million
4	Zack Wheeler	SP	Philadelphia Phillies	$42 million
4	Bo Bichette	3B	New York Mets	$42 million
6	Aaron Judge	OF	New York Yankees	$40 million
7	Framber Valdez	SP	Detroit Tigers	$38.3 million
8	Jacob deGrom	SP	Texas Rangers	$37 million
9	Blake Snell	SP	Los Angeles Dodgers	$36.4 million
10	Gerrit Cole	SP	New York Yankees	$36 million

== Top 10 career earnings ==
Earnings up to date as of the end of the 2026 season.^{[E]}

Name	Team(s)	Position	Years	Earnings
Alex Rodriguez	Seattle Mariners; Texas Rangers; New York Yankees	SS, 3B	1994–2016	$485.2 million
Justin Verlander	Detroit Tigers; Houston Astros; New York Mets; San Francisco Giants	SP	2006–2026	$411.3 million
Miguel Cabrera	Florida Marlins; Detroit Tigers	1B, 3B, DH	2003–2023	$393.2 million
Max Scherzer	Arizona Diamondbacks; Detroit Tigers; Washington Nationals; Los Angeles Dodgers; New York Mets; Texas Rangers; Toronto Blue Jays	SP	2008–present	$365.1 million
Albert Pujols	St. Louis Cardinals; Los Angeles Angels; Los Angeles Dodgers	1B, 3B, OF, DH	2001–2022	$341.8 million
Zack Greinke	Kansas City Royals; Milwaukee Brewers; Los Angeles Angels; Los Angeles Dodgers; Arizona Diamondbacks; Houston Astros	SP	2004–2023	$341.0 million
Mike Trout	Los Angeles Angels	OF	2011–present	$338.6 million
Clayton Kershaw	Los Angeles Dodgers	SP	2009–2025	$314.7 million
Stephen Strasburg	Washington Nationals	SP	2010–2022	$267.2 million
Derek Jeter†	New York Yankees	SS	1995–2014	$266.3 million

== Salary progression ==
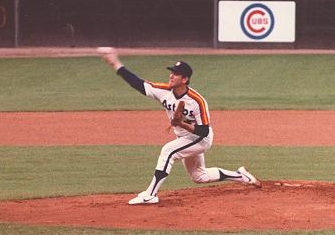
Nolan Ryan (pictured) became the first player to earn an average salary above $1 million in 1979. 17 years later, Albert Belle became the first player to average above $10 million a year.

This list documents the progression of the highest average annual value contracts/contract extensions.^{[P]}

Average annual salary	Date signed	Name	Team	Position	Contract duration (Years)	Ref(s)
$166,667	February 17, 1971	Carl Yastrzemski†	Boston Red Sox	OF	3	
$250,000	February 27, 1973	Dick Allen †	Chicago White Sox	1B	3	
$640,000	December 31, 1974	Catfish Hunter†	New York Yankees	SP	5	
$800,000	February 3, 1979	Rod Carew†	California Angels	1B	5	
$1,170,000	November 19, 1979	Nolan Ryan†	Houston Astros	SP	3	
$2,500,000^{[a]}	December 15, 1980	Dave Winfield†	New York Yankees	RF	10	
$2,600,000	September 4, 1985	Eddie Murray†	Baltimore Orioles	1B	5	
$2,633,333^{[b]}	February 16, 1989	Orel Hershiser	Los Angeles Dodgers	SP	3	
$2,970,000	November 17, 1989	Bret Saberhagen	Kansas City Royals	SP	3	
$3,000,000^{[c]}	November 22, 1989	Kirby Puckett†	Minnesota Twins	CF	3	
$3,200,000	December 1, 1989	Mark Langston	California Angels	SP	5	
$3,250,000	December 11, 1989	Mark Davis	Kansas City Royals	SP	4	
$3,500,000	January 17, 1990	Dave Stewart	Oakland Athletics	SP	2	
$3,750,000	January 22, 1990	Will Clark	San Francisco Giants	1B	4	
$3,860,000	April 9, 1990	Don Mattingly	New York Yankees	1B	5	
$4,700,000	June 28, 1990	Jose Canseco	Oakland Athletics	RF/DH	5	
$5,380,000	February 2, 1991	Roger Clemens	Boston Red Sox	SP	4	
$5,800,000	December 2, 1991	Bobby Bonilla	New York Mets	3B/RF	5	
$7,100,000	March 2, 1992	Ryne Sandberg†	Chicago Cubs	2B	4	
$7,290,000	December 6, 1992	Barry Bonds	San Francisco Giants	LF	6	
$8,500,000	January 31, 1996	Ken Griffey Jr.†	Seattle Mariners	CF	4	
$11,000,000	November 19, 1996	Albert Belle	Chicago White Sox	LF	5	
$11,450,000	March 20, 1997	Barry Bonds	San Francisco Giants	LF	2	
$11,500,000	August 10, 1997	Greg Maddux†	Atlanta Braves	SP	5	
$12,500,000	December 10, 1997	Pedro Martínez†	Boston Red Sox	SP	6	
$13,000,000	October 26, 1998	Mike Piazza†	New York Mets	C	7	
$13,333,333	November 25, 1998	Mo Vaughn	Anaheim Angels	1B	6	
$15,000,000	December 12, 1998	Kevin Brown	Los Angeles Dodgers	SP	7	
$15,450,000^{[d]}	August 11, 2000	Roger Clemens	New York Yankees	SP	2^{[d]}	
$17,000,000	October 20, 2000	Carlos Delgado	Toronto Blue Jays	1B	4	
$25,200,000	December 10, 2000	Alex Rodriguez	Texas Rangers	SS	10	
$27,500,000	December 13, 2007	Alex Rodriguez	New York Yankees	3B	10	
$30,714,285	January 15, 2014	Clayton Kershaw	Los Angeles Dodgers	SP	7	
$31,000,000	March 27, 2014	Miguel Cabrera	Detroit Tigers	1B	8	
$34,400,000	December 8, 2015	Zack Greinke	Arizona Diamondbacks	SP	6	
$35,541,667	March 19, 2019	Mike Trout	Los Angeles Angels	CF	12	
$36,000,000	December 16, 2019	Gerrit Cole	New York Yankees	SP	9	
$43,333,333	November 29, 2021	Max Scherzer	New York Mets	SP	3	
$46,081,476^{[f]}	December 11, 2023	Shohei Ohtani	Los Angeles Dodgers	DH/SP	10	
$51,000,000	December 9, 2024	Juan Soto	New York Mets	OF	15	
$57,180,000^{[g]}	January 15, 2026	Kyle Tucker	Los Angeles Dodgers	OF	4	

== See also ==
- Highest-paid NBA players by season
- List of player salaries in the NHL
- List of highest-paid American television stars
- List of highest-paid film actors
- List of salaries

== Notes ==
- ^{H} Under this deal, Rodriguez would also receive $6 million bonuses when he tied the career home run totals of Willie Mays (660), Babe Ruth (714), Hank Aaron (755), and Barry Bonds (762), as well as for breaking Bonds' record. Rodriguez finished with 696 home runs, only getting a bonus for matching Mays.
- ^{E} "Earnings" as discussed here refers to salaries paid to players under MLB contracts and does not include advertising or other sources of income. All values are listed in nominal dollars.
- ^{P} "Average annual value" is calculated as the total value of a contract (less bonuses) divided by the number of years. A $20 million, 2-year contract would have an average annual value of $10 million, even if the player actually received $9 million one season and $11 million in the other. This also does not include contracts for less than a season prorated in value for a full season such as Roger Clemens' 2006 and 2007 contracts. Contract values are listed in nominal dollars unless they include deferred payments at signing.
- ^{a} Dave Winfield initially negotiated a 10-year deal in 1980 worth a projected $25 million ($2.5 million per year). However, Yankees owner George Steinbrenner reportedly had not fully understood a cost of living adjustment provision in it and the 10-year contract was renegotiated a few months later. The final precise value is unclear, although it fell between $20 and $25 million in total value ($2–2.5 million a year).
- ^{b} Hershiser and Frank Viola both won the 1988 Cy Young Award, and Viola signed an identically sized $7.9 million, 3-year contract two months after Hershiser.
- ^{c} Rickey Henderson signed a $12 million, 4-year contract with the Oakland Athletics on November 28, 1989, 6 days after Puckett signed his $9 million, 3-year contract.
- ^{d} Roger Clemens signed a contract extension during the 2000 season covering 2001 and 2002 along with a player option for 2003. Clemens was paid $10.3 million each year for 2001 and 2002, with the same $10.3 million available if he elected to play in 2003 under his option. However, Clemens also received $10.3 million if he rejected the option. As a result, he could effectively collect the full $30.9 million of contract value for only two years of play ($15.45 million annually). However, the Yankees valued this deal as a $10.3 million annually, three-year deal. He became a free agent after the 2002 season and ultimately re-signed with the Yankees for a new, one-year contract in which they bought out the previous option.
- ^{f} Shohei Ohtani signed a $700 million, 10-year contract with the Dodgers. He will receive $2 million a year for ten years and then $68 million a year for the following ten years. Because of this, the net present value is lower than $70 million per season.
- ^{g} Kyle Tucker signed a $240 million, 4-year contract with the Dodgers. The contract includes $30 million deferred, so the net present value is lower than $60 million per year.
