= List of salaries =

The following articles include lists of salaries:

== General ==
- List of countries by average wage
- List of American countries by average wage
- List of European countries by average wage
- List of $1 salaries
- U.S. average salaries by sector

== Entertainment ==
- Forbes list of the world's highest-paid musicians
- List of highest paid American television stars
- List of highest paid film actors
- Salaries of screenwriters
- Forbes list of the world's highest-paid models
- Forbes list of the world's highest-paid dead celebrities
- List of highest paid comedians

== Government ==
- List of heads of state and government salaries
- Salaries of federal judges in the United States
- Salaries, expenses, and allowances of members of the Scottish Parliament
- Salaries of government officials in India
- Salaries of members of the United Kingdom Parliament
- Salaries of members of the United States Congress
- Salaries of members of the Sri Lankan Parliament

== Sports ==
- Forbes' list of world's highest-paid athletes
- List of highest-paid NBA players by season
- List of highest paid Major League Baseball players
- List of highest-paid NHL players by season
- List of largest sports contracts
- List of professional sports leagues by revenue

== Medical ==
- List of salaries in different medical specialties
