= Division (sport) =

Group of teams who compete against each other for a championship

In sports, a division is a group of teams who compete against each other for a championship.

== League system ==
In sports using a league system (also known as a pyramid structure), a division consists of a group of teams who play a sport at a similar competitive level. Teams can move up to a higher division of play or drop down to a lower one via the process of promotion and relegation, based on their performance in the standings at the end of the season. The existence of divisions based on level of competition ensures that teams at one competitive level can play other teams at a similar competitive level, thus creating parity and more exciting matches.

== Franchise system ==
In North America, where sports usually operate on a franchise system rather than a league system, a division is a group of teams within a league which is organized along geographical lines rather than competitive success. Teams based in cities that are in a particular region of the continent are grouped together in the same division. For instance, in Major League Baseball, both the American and National Leagues have East, Central, and West divisions; the teams in each division are mostly (but not always) located in the eastern, central, and western sections of North America respectively. In a franchise system, teams are not promoted or relegated as are teams in a league system. All teams in the league (and by extension, the divisions of the league) are at the same competitive level and remain so year after year.

North American professional sports leagues often construct their season schedules in a way such that teams in a division play matches against each other more often than other teams in the league. This not only has the effect of reducing travel costs, but also creates exciting rivalries between the teams in the division. Moreover, the top teams in a division qualify for the postseason playoff tournament that crowns the league champion, which heightens the rivalries between the teams in a division.

Geographically-based divisions can become skewed if an expansion team joins the league or if one of the franchises within a division moves to another city, necessitating a shuffling or realignment of the teams in a division. Furthermore, the results of the realignment may not always reflect geographical realities. For instance, in 1995, the Los Angeles Rams of the National Football League (NFL) moved to St. Louis, Missouri and became the St. Louis Rams. The team retained its place in the NFC West division despite the fact that St. Louis is further east than Dallas, Texas, home of the Dallas Cowboys. Although Dallas is located in the south-central United States, the Cowboys are a member of the NFC East division due to their long-standing rivalries with the New York Giants, Philadelphia Eagles, and Washington Commanders, all of whom are located on the Eastern seaboard.

== U.S. college sports ==
In U.S. college sports, a "division" has a meaning different from either sense listed above, although somewhat closer to that of the league system.

The major governing bodies for college sports, the NCAA and NAIA, divide their member schools into large competitive groups. These groups are much larger than divisions in either the league or franchise system—for example, the NCAA's highest competitive level, Division I, has more than 300 member schools. The vast majority of teams are members of conferences, smaller groupings that usually have between 6 and 14 members. Conference champions, plus selected other teams, compete in national championship tournaments (with the exception of schools in the highest level of NCAA (American) football, which have never had an NCAA-recognized national championship).

As an example, the NCAA is split into three divisions:

- Division I – Usually the largest and most prominent schools, with the largest athletic budgets. All Division I member schools are allowed to award athletic scholarships to students, although some schools and conferences voluntarily choose not to award athletic scholarships in some or all sports (most notably the Ivy League, which prohibits such scholarships in all sports).
- Division II – Generally smaller schools that do not choose to take on the sometimes-massive expense of Division I athletics. The NCAA allows D-II schools to award scholarships, but places much more stringent limits on the amount of athletic aid awarded than at the D-I level.
- Division III – Schools, usually but not always small institutions, at which intercollegiate sports is treated more as a regular student activity. In keeping with this philosophy, the NCAA prohibits Division III schools from awarding athletic scholarships.

=== "Division" within conferences ===
The term division is also used in US college sports to indicate the groupings of members of a given conference. However, this usage is more recent. The first conference to divide its teams into divisions was the Southeastern Conference which, upon expanding to 12 members in 1992, divided into Eastern and Western divisions. Other conferences have undergone similar expansion and division. The usage in the section above is still maintained. For example, the Georgia Bulldogs are in Division I, but are also in the Eastern Division of the Southeastern Conference.

== See also ==
- Athletic conference
- List of professional sports leagues
- Group tournaments
