= Salaries of federal judges in the United States =

Aspect of American government

Federal judge salaries in the United States are determined by the United States Congress and are governed in part by the United States Constitution, depending in part on the court on which the judge sits. In particular, United States federal judges confirmed under Article III of the Constitution have compensation that "shall not be diminished during their continuance in office." Other federal judges have salaries that may be adjusted without direct constitutional constraints, however statutory schemes usually govern these salaries. Debates over judicial salaries and their increase and treatment have occurred since the ratification of the Constitution.

Compensation varies based upon the particular judgeship, though it generally increases commensurate with the office.

== Article III judges ==
Article III federal judges are those appointed under Article III, Section 1 of the U.S Constitution. Due to the Compensation Clause, these judges are federal judges that may not have their salaries diminished during their time in office, and are appointed to indefinite terms and may not be removed unless they resign or are impeached.

=== Supreme Court ===
The United States Supreme Court is the highest federal appellate court. Its members are commonly called justices.

The following table lists annual salary increases for the justices from 1789 to present.

Year	Chief Justice	Associate Justices	2025 inflation adjusted figures	
Year	Chief Justice	Associate Justices	Chief Justice	Associate Justice
1789	$4,000	$3,500	Data not available	Data not available
1819	$5,000	$4,500	$105,163	$94,647
1855	$6,500	$6,000	$224,598	$207,321
1871	$8,500	$8,000	$228,438	$215,000
1873	$10,500	$10,000	$282,188	$268,750
1903	$13,000	$12,500	$465,833	$447,917
1911	$15,000	$14,500	$518,304	$501,027
1926	$20,500	$20,000	$372,815	$363,722
1946	$25,500	$25,000	$421,011	$412,756
1955	$35,500	$35,000	$426,661	$420,652
1964	$40,000	$39,500	$415,236	$410,046
1969	$62,500	$60,000	$548,718	$526,770
1975	$65,600	$63,000	$392,505	$376,948
1976	$68,800	$66,000	$389,263	$373,421
1977	$75,000	$72,000	$398,476	$382,537
1978	$79,100	$76,000	$390,455	$375,153
1979	$84,700	$81,300	$375,732	$360,650
1980	$92,400	$88,700	$361,054	$346,596
1981	$96,800	$93,000	$342,804	$329,347
1982	$100,700	$96,700	$335,956	$322,611
1984	$104,700	$100,600	$324,463	$311,757
1985	$108,400	$104,100	$324,496	$311,624
1987	$111,700	$107,200	$316,549	$303,796
1987	$115,000	$110,000	$325,901	$311,731
1990	$124,000	$118,600	$305,578	$292,271
1991	$160,600	$153,600	$379,625	$363,078
1992	$166,200	$159,000	$381,310	$364,791
1993	$171,500	$164,100	$382,230	$365,738
1998	$175,400	$167,900	$346,467	$331,652
2000	$181,400	$173,600	$339,139	$324,557
2001	$186,300	$178,300	$338,743	$324,197
2002	$192,600	$184,400	$344,756	$330,078
2003	$198,600	$190,100	$347,586	$332,709
2004	$203,000	$194,300	$346,023	$331,193
2005	$208,100	$199,200	$343,051	$328,380
2006	$212,100	$203,000	$338,737	$324,204
2008	$217,400	$208,100	$325,092	$311,185
2009	$223,500	$213,900	$335,406	$320,999
2010	$223,500	$213,900	$329,981	$315,807
2011	$223,500	$213,900	$319,876	$306,136
2012	$223,500	$213,900	$313,431	$299,968
2013	$223,500	$213,900	$308,909	$295,640
2014	$255,500	$244,400	$347,479	$335,647
2015	$258,100	$246,800	$350,571	$335,223
2016	$260,700	$249,300	$349,733	$334,439
2017	$263,300	$251,800	$345,836	$330,731
2018	$267,000	$255,300	$342,330	$327,329
2019	$270,700	$258,900	$340,885	$326,026
2020	$277,700	$265,600	$345,474	$330,420
2021	$280,500	$268,300	$333,272	$318,777
2022	$286,700	$274,200	$315,422	$301,670
2023	$298,500	$285,400	$315,420	$301,578
2024	$312,200	$298,500	N/A	N/A
2025	$317,500	$303,600	N/A	N/A

=== Appeals Court ===
The following is a list of salaries for judges on the United States Court of Appeals.

Year	Salary	2025 inflation adjusted figures
1891	$6,000	Data not available
1903	$7,000	$250,833
1919	$8,500	$157,845
1926	$12,500	$227,326
1946	$17,500	$288,929
1955	$25,500	$306,475
1964	$33,000	$342,570
1969	$42,500	$373,128
1975	$44,600	$266,855
1976	$46,800	$264,789
1977	$57,500	$305,498
1978	$60,700	$299,629
1979	$65,000	$288,343
1980	$70,900	$277,043
1981	$74,300	$263,123
1982	$77,300	$257,889
1984	$80,400	$249,158
1985	$83,200	$249,059
1987	$85,700	$242,867
1987	$95,000	$269,222
1990	$102,500	$252,595
1991	$132,700	$313,675
1992	$137,300	$315,005
1993	$141,700	$315,814
1998	$145,000	$286,418
2000	$149,900	$280,248
2001	$153,900	$279,831
2002	$159,100	$284,790
2003	$164,000	$287,030
2004	$167,600	$285,682
2005	$171,800	$283,211
2006	$175,100	$279,646
2008	$179,500	$268,418
2009	$184,500	$276,879
2010	$184,500	$272,400
2011	$184,500	$264,059
2012	$184,500	$258,739
2013	$184,500	$255,005
2014	$211,200	$287,231
2015	$213,300	$289,720
2016	$215,400	$288,962
2017	$217,600	$285,810
2018	$220,600	$282,839
2019	$223,700	$281,700
2020	$229,500	$285,510
2021	$231,800	$275,410
2022	$236,900	$260,633
2023	$246,600	$260,578
2024	$257,900	N/A
2025	$262,300	N/A

=== District Court ===
The following are tables of district judge salaries in the United States from 1789 to present. District judge salaries varied based on the state prior to 1891. They were unified in 1891.

Salaries of US district judges 1789–1867
Year	Minimum	Maximum	2025 inflation adjusted figures	
1789	$800	$1,800	Data not available	Data not available
1812	$800	$3,000	$15,176	$56,912
1816	$800	$3,100	$15,176	$58,809
1817	$800	$3,000	$16,125	$60,469
1830	$1,200	$3,500	$36,281	$105,820
1844	$1,200	$3,800	$41,464	$131,304
1847	$1,200	$3,500	$41,464	$120,937
1852	$1,200	$5,000	$46,440	$193,500
1854	$1,200	$3,500	$43,000	$125,417
1860	$1,200	$6,300	$43,000	$215,000
1862	$1,200	$3,500	$38,700	$112,875
1866	$1,200	$4,500	$26,386	$98,949
1867	$3,500	$5,000	$80,625	$115,179

Salaries of US district judges 1891–present
Year	Salary	2025 inflation adjusted figures
1891	$5,000	$179,167
1903	$6,000	$215,000
1919	$7,500	$139,275
1926	$10,000	$181,861
1946	$15,000	$247,654
1955	$22,500	$270,419
1964	$30,000	$311,427
1969	$40,000	$351,180
1975	$42,000	$251,299
1976	$44,000	$248,947
1977	$54,500	$289,559
1978	$57,500	$283,833
1979	$61,500	$272,816
1980	$67,100	$262,194
1981	$70,300	$248,958
1982	$73,100	$243,877
1984	$76,000	$235,522
1985	$78,700	$235,589
1987	$81,100	$229,831
1987	$89,500	$253,636
1990	$96,600	$238,055
1991	$125,100	$295,710
1992	$129,500	$297,110
1993	$133,600	$297,761
1998	$136,700	$270,023
2000	$141,300	$264,170
2001	$145,100	$263,831
2002	$150,000	$268,501
2003	$154,700	$270,753
2004	$158,100	$269,489
2005	$162,100	$267,221
2006	$165,200	$263,835
2008	$169,300	$253,165
2009	$174,000	$261,121
2010	$174,000	$256,898
2011	$174,000	$249,031
2012	$174,000	$244,014
2013	$174,000	$240,493
2014	$199,100	$270,775
2015	$201,100	$273,149
2016	$203,100	$272,462
2017	$205,100	$269,392
2018	$208,000	$266,684
2019	$210,900	$265,581
2020	$216,400	$269,213
2021	$218,600	$259,727
2022	$223,400	$245,781
2023	$232,600	$245,785
2024	$243,300	N/A
2025	$247,400	N/A

=== Court of International Trade ===
According to the Federal Judiciary Center, Court of International Trade judges receive the same salary as district court judges.

== Non Article III judges ==
=== Magistrate judges ===
Since 1988, the salary of magistrate judges is set by the Judicial Conference of the United States, but may not exceed 92 percent of the salary of district court judges.

=== Bankruptcy judges ===
Since 1988, bankruptcy judges receive compensation equal to 92 percent of the salary of district judges.

=== Administrative Law Judges ===
United States Administrative Law Judges (U.S. ALJs) are individuals appointed under 5 U.S.C. 3105 for administrative proceedings conducted in accordance with 5 U.S.C. 556 and 557. ALJs are paid under 5 U.S.C. 5372.

The ALJ pay system has three levels of basic pay: AL-1, AL-2, and AL-3. The base pay for each step varies according to the location of the position. The rate of basic pay for AL-3, rate A, may not be less than 65 percent of the rate of basic pay for level IV of the Executive Schedule. The rate of basic pay for AL-1 may not exceed the rate for level IV of the Executive Schedule.

ALJs also receive locality payments under 5 U.S.C. 5304. Locality rates for ALJs may not exceed the rate for level III of the Executive Schedule.

An ALJ who is appointed and placed in level AL-3 must be paid at the minimum rate A, unless the ALJ is eligible for a higher rate because of prior service or superior qualifications. Level AL-3 has 5 rates and it takes a total of 7 years to advanced from ALJ-3A to ALJ-3F.

As of 2022, the pay for ALJ-3, including locality adjustments, ranges from $136,651.00 per year to $187,300.00 depending on the particular locality and advancement from rate A to F. As of 2022, pay for ALJ-2 and ALJ-1 is capped at $187,300.00 based on salary compression caused by salary caps based on the Executive Schedule.

=== Tax Court judges ===
Judges of the Tax Court receive the same compensation as district court judges.

=== Court of Federal Claims judges ===
Since 1988, judges of the Court of Federal Claims receive the same compensation as district court judges.

=== Court of Appeals for the Armed Forces ===
Judges of the Court of Appeals for the Armed Forces receive the same compensation as judges of the circuit courts of appeals.

=== Court of Appeals for Veterans Claims ===
Judges of the Court of Appeals for Veterans Claims receive the same compensation as district court judges.

== Territorial judges ==
Territorial Courts are created under Article IV and exist in U.S. Territories. Only three currently exist. Compensation is fixed at the rate of regular district court judges.

== Hybrid courts and others ==
=== United States Commerce Court ===
The United States Commerce Court sat from 1910 to 1913. It had a staggered and limited-term membership, but consisted of Article III Appellate Court judges that would be at-large judges when not on the Court.

=== United States Court of Claims ===
The United States Court of Claims was a court that served from 1855 to 1982. It existed as both an Article I and Article III court (after 1953).

=== Court of Customs and Patent Appeals ===
The Court of Customs and Patent Appeals was a court sitting from 1909 to 1982. Its treatment as an Article I or Article III court is ambiguous; it was originally ruled an Article I court, however it was later ruled an Article III court after Congress amended the law creating it.

== See also ==
- Judicial independence
