= Forbes list of the world's highest-paid athletes =

Compilation of world's most paid athletes

This is a list of the highest-paid athletes in the world as ranked by Forbes magazine.

== 2026 list ==
The 2026 list:

Rank	Name	Sport	Country	Total	Salary/winnings	Endorsements
1	Cristiano Ronaldo	Association football	Portugal	$300 million	$235 million	$65 million
2	Canelo Álvarez	Boxing	Mexico	$170 million	$160 million	$10 million
3	Lionel Messi	Association football	Argentina	$140 million	$70 million	$70 million
4	LeBron James	Basketball	United States	$137.8 million	$52.8 million	$85 million
5	Shohei Ohtani	Baseball	Japan	$127.6 million	$2.6 million	$125 million
6	Stephen Curry	Basketball	United States	$124.7 million	$59.7 million	$65 million
7	Jon Rahm	Golf	Spain	$107 million	$97 million	$10 million
8	Karim Benzema	Association football	France	$104 million	$100 million	$4 million
9	Kevin Durant	Basketball	United States	$103.8 million	$54.8 million	$49 million
10	Lewis Hamilton	Auto racing	United Kingdom	$100 million	$70 million	$30 million

== 2025 list ==
The 2025 list:

Rank	Name	Sport	Country	Total	Salary/winnings	Endorsements
1	Cristiano Ronaldo	Association football	Portugal	$275 million	$225 million	$50 million
2	Stephen Curry	Basketball	United States	$156 million	$56 million	$100 million
3	Tyson Fury	Boxing	England; Republic of Ireland (Note: Fury was born in England to Irish Traveller parents. He has competed for both England and the Republic of Ireland at amateur level and holds both British and Irish nationality.)	$146 million	$140 million	$6 million
4	Dak Prescott	American football	United States	$137 million	$127 million	$10 million
5	Lionel Messi	Association football	Argentina	$135 million	$60 million	$75 million
6	LeBron James	Basketball	United States	$133.8 million	$48.8 million	$85 million
7	Juan Soto	Baseball	Dominican Republic	$114 million	$109 million	$5 million
8	Karim Benzema	Association football	France	$104 million	$100 million	$4 million
9	Shohei Ohtani	Baseball	Japan	$102.5 million	$2.5 million	$100 million
10	Kevin Durant	Basketball	United States	$101.4 million	$51.4 million	$50 million

== 2024 list ==
The 2024 list:

Rank	Name	Sport	Country	Total	Salary/winnings	Endorsements
1	Cristiano Ronaldo	Association football	Portugal	$260 million	$200 million	$60 million
2	Jon Rahm	Golf	Spain	$218 million	$198 million	$20 million
3	Lionel Messi	Association football	Argentina	$135 million	$65 million	$70 million
4	LeBron James	Basketball	United States	$128.2 million	$48.2 million	$80 million
5	Giannis Antetokounmpo	Basketball	Greece	$111 million	$46 million	$65 million
6	Kylian Mbappé	Association football	France	$110 million	$90 million	$20 million
7	Neymar	Association football	Brazil	$108 million	$80 million	$28 million
8	Karim Benzema	Association football	France	$106 million	$100 million	$6 million
9	Stephen Curry	Basketball	United States	$102 million	$52 million	$50 million
10	Lamar Jackson	American football	United States	$100.5 million	$98.5 million	$2 million

== 2023 list ==
The 2023 list:

Rank	Name	Sport	Country	Total	Salary/winnings	Endorsements
1	Cristiano Ronaldo	Association football	Portugal	$136 million	$46 million	$90 million
2	Lionel Messi	Association football	Argentina	$130 million	$65 million	$65 million
3	Kylian Mbappé	Association football	France	$120 million	$100 million	$20 million
4	LeBron James	Basketball	United States	$119.5 million	$44.5 million	$75 million
5	Canelo Álvarez	Boxing	Mexico	$110 million	$100 million	$10 million
6	Dustin Johnson	Golf	United States	$107 million	$102 million	$5 million
7	Phil Mickelson	Golf	United States	$106 million	$104 million	$2 million
8	Stephen Curry	Basketball	United States	$100.4 million	$48.4 million	$52 million
9	Roger Federer	Tennis	Switzerland	$95.1 million	$0.1 million	$95 million
10	Kevin Durant	Basketball	United States	$89.1 million	$44.1 million	$45 million

== 2022 list ==
The 2022 list:

Rank	Name	Sport	Country	Total	Salary/winnings	Endorsements
1	Lionel Messi	Association football	Argentina	$130 million	$75 million	$55 million
2	LeBron James	Basketball	United States	$121.2 million	$41.2 million	$80 million
3	Cristiano Ronaldo	Association football	Portugal	$115 million	$60 million	$55 million
4	Neymar	Association football	Brazil	$95 million	$70 million	$25 million
5	Stephen Curry	Basketball	United States	$92.8 million	$45.8 million	$47 million
6	Kevin Durant	Basketball	United States	$92.1 million	$42.1 million	$50 million
7	Roger Federer	Tennis	Switzerland	$90.7 million	$0.7 million	$90 million
8	Canelo Álvarez	Boxing	Mexico	$90 million	$85 million	$5 million
9	Tom Brady	American football	United States	$83.9 million	$31.9 million	$52 million
10	Giannis Antetokounmpo	Basketball	Greece	$80.9 million	$39.9 million	$41 million

== 2021 list ==
The 2021 list:

Rank	Name	Sport	Country	Total	Salary/winnings	Endorsements
1	Conor McGregor	Mixed martial arts	Republic of Ireland	$180 million	$22 million	$158 million
2	Lionel Messi	Association football	Argentina	$130 million	$97 million	$33 million
3	Cristiano Ronaldo	Association football	Portugal	$120 million	$70 million	$50 million
4	Dak Prescott	American football	United States	$107.5 million	$97.5 million	$10 million
5	LeBron James	Basketball	United States	$96.5 million	$31.5 million	$65 million
6	Neymar	Association football	Brazil	$95 million	$76 million	$19 million
7	Roger Federer	Tennis	Switzerland	$90 million	$0.03 million	$90 million
8	Lewis Hamilton	Auto racing	United Kingdom	$82 million	$70 million	$12 million
9	Tom Brady	American football	United States	$76 million	$45 million	$31 million
10	Kevin Durant	Basketball	United States	$75 million	$31 million	$44 million

== 2020 list ==
The 2020 list:

Rank	Name	Sport	Country	Total	Salary/winnings	Endorsements
1	Roger Federer	Tennis	Switzerland	$106.3 million	$6.3 million	$100 million
2	Cristiano Ronaldo	Association football	Portugal	$105 million	$60 million	$45 million
3	Lionel Messi	Association football	Argentina	$104 million	$72 million	$32 million
4	Neymar	Association football	Brazil	$95.5 million	$70.5 million	$25 million
5	LeBron James	Basketball	United States	$88.2 million	$28.2 million	$60 million
6	Stephen Curry	Basketball	United States	$74.4 million	$30.4 million	$44 million
7	Kevin Durant	Basketball	United States	$63.9 million	$28.9 million	$35 million
8	Tiger Woods	Golf	United States	$62.3 million	$2.3 million	$60 million
9	Kirk Cousins	American football	United States	$60.5 million	$58 million	$2.5 million
10	Carson Wentz	American football	United States	$59.1 million	$55.1 million	$4 million

== 2010–2019 list ==
The 2010–2019 list:

Rank	Name	Sport	Nation	Earnings
1	Floyd Mayweather Jr.	Boxing	United States	$915 million
2	Cristiano Ronaldo	Association football	Portugal	$800 million
3	Lionel Messi	Association football	Argentina	$750 million
4	LeBron James	Basketball	United States	$680 million
5	Roger Federer	Tennis	Switzerland	$640 million
6	Tiger Woods	Golf	United States	$615 million
7	Phil Mickelson	Golf	United States	$480 million
8	Manny Pacquiao	Boxing	Philippines	$435 million
9	Kevin Durant	Basketball	United States	$425 million
10	Lewis Hamilton	Auto racing	United Kingdom	$400 million

== 2019 list ==
The 2019 list:

Rank	Name	Sport	Nation	Total	Salary/Winnings	Endorsements
1	Lionel Messi	Association football	Argentina	$127 million	$92 million	$35 million
2	Cristiano Ronaldo	Association football	Portugal	$109 million	$65 million	$44 million
3	Neymar	Association football	Brazil	$105 million	$75 million	$30 million
4	Canelo Álvarez	Boxing	Mexico	$94 million	$92 million	$2 million
5	Roger Federer	Tennis	Switzerland	$93.4 million	$7.4 million	$86 million
6	Russell Wilson	American football	United States	$89.5 million	$80.5 million	$9 million
7	Aaron Rodgers	American football	United States	$89.3 million	$80.3 million	$9 million
8	LeBron James	Basketball	United States	$89 million	$36 million	$53 million
9	Stephen Curry	Basketball	United States	$79.8 million	$37.8 million	$42 million
10	Kevin Durant	Basketball	United States	$65.4 million	$30.4 million	$35 million

== 2018 list ==
The 2018 list:

Rank	Name	Sport	Nation	Total	Salary/Winnings	Endorsements
1	Floyd Mayweather Jr.	Boxing	United States	$285 million	$275 million	$10 million
2	Lionel Messi	Association football	Argentina	$111 million	$84 million	$27 million
3	Cristiano Ronaldo	Association football	Portugal	$108 million	$61 million	$47 million
4	Conor McGregor	Mixed martial arts	Republic of Ireland	$99 million	$85 million	$14 million
5	Neymar	Association football	Brazil	$90 million	$73 million	$17 million
6	LeBron James	Basketball	United States	$85.5 million	$33.5 million	$52 million
7	Roger Federer	Tennis	Switzerland	$77.2 million	$12.2 million	$65 million
8	Stephen Curry	Basketball	United States	$76.9 million	$34.9 million	$42 million
9	Matt Ryan	American football	United States	$67.3 million	$62.3 million	$5 million
10	Matthew Stafford	American football	United States	$59.5 million	$57.5 million	$2 million

== 2017 list ==
The 2017 list:

Rank	Name	Sport	Nation	Total	Salary/Winnings	Endorsements
1	Cristiano Ronaldo	Association football	Portugal	$93 million	$58 million	$35 million
2	LeBron James	Basketball	United States	$86.2 million	$31.2 million	$55 million
3	Lionel Messi	Association football	Argentina	$80 million	$53 million	$27 million
4	Roger Federer	Tennis	Switzerland	$64 million	$6 million	$58 million
5	Kevin Durant	Basketball	United States	$60.6 million	$26.6 million	$34 million
6	Andrew Luck	American football	United States	$50 million	$47 million	$3 million
6	Rory McIlroy	Golf	Northern Ireland	$50 million	$16 million	$34 million
8	Stephen Curry	Basketball	United States	$47.3 million	$12.3 million	$35 million
9	James Harden	Basketball	United States	$46.6 million	$26.6 million	$20 million
10	Lewis Hamilton	Auto racing	United Kingdom	$46 million	$38 million	$8 million

== 2016 list ==
The 2016 list:

Rank	Name	Sport	Nation	Total	Salary/Winnings	Endorsements
1	Cristiano Ronaldo	Association football	Portugal	$88 million	$56 million	$32 million
2	Lionel Messi	Association football	Argentina	$81.4 million	$53.4 million	$28 million
3	LeBron James	Basketball	United States	$77.2 million	$23.2 million	$54 million
4	Roger Federer	Tennis	Switzerland	$67.8 million	$7.8 million	$60 million
5	Kevin Durant	Basketball	United States	$56.2 million	$20.2 million	$36 million
6	Novak Djokovic	Tennis	Serbia	$55.8 million	$21.8 million	$34 million
7	Cam Newton	American football	United States	$53.1 million	$41.1 million	$12 million
8	Phil Mickelson	Golf	United States	$52.9 million	$2.9 million	$50 million
9	Jordan Spieth	Golf	United States	$52.8 million	$20.8 million	$32 million
10	Kobe Bryant	Basketball	United States	$50 million	$25 million	$25 million

== 2015 list ==
The 2015 list was released on 10 June 2015.

Rank	Name	Sport	Nation	Total	Salary/Winnings	Endorsements
1	Floyd Mayweather Jr.	Boxing	United States	$300 million	$285 million	$15 million
2	Manny Pacquiao	Boxing	Philippines	$160 million	$148 million	$12 million
3	Cristiano Ronaldo	Association football	Portugal	$79.6 million	$52.6 million	$27 million
4	Lionel Messi	Association football	Argentina	$73.8 million	$51.8 million	$22 million
5	Roger Federer	Tennis	Switzerland	$67 million	$9 million	$58 million
6	LeBron James	Basketball	United States	$64.8 million	$20.8 million	$44 million
7	Kevin Durant	Basketball	United States	$54.1 million	$19.1 million	$35 million
8	Phil Mickelson	Golf	United States	$50.8 million	$2.8 million	$48 million
9	Tiger Woods	Golf	United States	$50.6 million	$0.6 million	$50 million
10	Kobe Bryant	Basketball	United States	$49.5 million	$23.5 million	$26 million

== 2014 list ==
The 2014 list was released on 11 June 2014.

Rank	Name	Sport	Nation	Total	Salary/Winnings	Endorsements
1	Floyd Mayweather Jr.	Boxing	United States	$105 million	$105 million	$0
2	Cristiano Ronaldo	Association football	Portugal	$80 million	$52 million	$28 million
3	LeBron James	Basketball	United States	$72.3 million	$19.3 million	$53 million
4	Lionel Messi	Association football	Argentina	$64.7 million	$41.7 million	$23 million
5	Kobe Bryant	Basketball	United States	$61.5 million	$30.5 million	$31 million
6	Tiger Woods	Golf	United States	$61.2 million	$6.2 million	$55 million
7	Roger Federer	Tennis	Switzerland	$56.2 million	$4.2 million	$52 million
8	Phil Mickelson	Golf	United States	$53.2 million	$5.2 million	$48 million
9	Rafael Nadal	Tennis	Spain	$44.5 million	$14.5 million	$30 million
10	Matt Ryan	American football	United States	$43.8 million	$42 million	$1.8 million

== 2013 list ==
The 2013 list was released on 5 June 2013.

Rank	Name	Sport	Nation	Total	Salary/Winnings	Endorsements
1	Tiger Woods	Golf	United States	$78.1 million	$13.1 million	$65 million
2	Roger Federer	Tennis	Switzerland	$71.5 million	$6.5 million	$65 million
3	Kobe Bryant	Basketball	United States	$61.9 million	$27.9 million	$34 million
4	LeBron James	Basketball	United States	$59.8 million	$17.8 million	$42 million
5	Drew Brees	American football	United States	$51 million	$40 million	$11 million
6	Aaron Rodgers	American football	United States	$49 million	$43 million	$6 million
7	Phil Mickelson	Golf	United States	$48.7 million	$4.7 million	$44 million
8	David Beckham	Association football	England	$47.2 million	$5.2 million	$42 million
9	Cristiano Ronaldo	Association football	Portugal	$44 million	$23 million	$21 million
10	Lionel Messi	Association football	Argentina	$41.3 million	$20.3 million	$21 million

== 2012 list ==
The 2012 list was released on 18 June 2012.

Rank	Name	Sport	Nationality	Total earnings	Salary/winnings	Endorsements
1	Floyd Mayweather Jr.	Boxing	United States	$85 million	$85 million	$0
2	Manny Pacquiao	Boxing	Philippines	$62 million	$56 million	$6 million
3	Tiger Woods	Golf	United States	$59.4 million	$4.4 million	$55 million
4	LeBron James	Basketball	United States	$53 million	$13 million	$40 million
5	Roger Federer	Tennis	Switzerland	$52.7 million	$7.7 million	$45 million
6	Kobe Bryant	Basketball	United States	$52.3 million	$20.3 million	$32 million
7	Phil Mickelson	Golf	United States	$47.8 million	$4.8 million	$43 million
8	David Beckham	Association football	England	$46 million	$9 million	$37 million
9	Cristiano Ronaldo	Association football	Portugal	$42.5 million	$20.5 million	$22 million
10	Peyton Manning	American football	United States	$42.4 million	$32.4 million	$10 million

== Statistics ==
=== Most No. 1 appearances ===
Rank	Name	Sport	Nationality	Winner
1	Cristiano Ronaldo	Association football	Portugal	6 (2016, 2017, 2023, 2024, 2025, 2026)
2	Floyd Mayweather Jr.	Boxing	United States	4 (2012, 2014, 2015, 2018)
3	Lionel Messi	Association football	Argentina	2 (2019, 2022)
4	Tiger Woods	Golf	United States	1 (2013)
4	Roger Federer	Tennis	Switzerland	1 (2020)
4	Conor McGregor	Mixed martial arts	Republic of Ireland	1 (2021)

=== Most Top 10 appearances ===
Rank	Name	Sport	Nationality	Top 10
1	Cristiano Ronaldo	Association football	Portugal	15
1	LeBron James	Basketball	United States	15
3	Lionel Messi	Association football	Argentina	13
4	Roger Federer	Tennis	Switzerland	12
5	Kevin Durant	Basketball	United States	10
6	Stephen Curry	Basketball	United States	9
7	Phil Mickelson	Golf	United States	6
7	Neymar	Association football	Brazil	6
9	Tiger Woods	Golf	United States	5
9	Kobe Bryant	Basketball	United States	5

=== Athletes with earnings $100 million or more ===
Rank	Name	Sport	Nationality	$100 million+
1	Cristiano Ronaldo	Association football	Portugal	9 (2018, 2019, 2020, 2021, 2022, 2023, 2024, 2025, 2026)
1	Lionel Messi	Association football	Argentina	9 (2018, 2019, 2020, 2021, 2022, 2023, 2024, 2025, 2026)
3	LeBron James	Basketball	United States	5 (2022, 2023, 2024, 2025, 2026)
4	Floyd Mayweather Jr.	Boxing	United States	3 (2014, 2015, 2018)
4	Canelo Álvarez	Boxing	Mexico	3 (2023, 2024, 2026)
4	Stephen Curry	Basketball	United States	3 (2023, 2025, 2026)
4	Jon Rahm	Golf	Spain	3 (2024, 2025, 2026)
4	Karim Benzema	Association football	France	3 (2024, 2025, 2026)
9	Neymar	Association football	Brazil	2 (2019, 2024)
9	Kylian Mbappé	Association football	France	2 (2023, 2024)
9	Dak Prescott	American football	United States	2 (2021, 2025)
9	Shohei Ohtani	Baseball	Japan	2 (2025, 2026)
9	Kevin Durant	Basketball	United States	2 (2025, 2026)
14	Manny Pacquiao	Boxing	Philippines	1 (2015)
14	Roger Federer	Tennis	Switzerland	1 (2020)
14	Conor McGregor	Mixed martial arts	Republic of Ireland	1 (2021)
14	Dustin Johnson	Golf	United States	1 (2023)
14	Phil Mickelson	Golf	United States	1 (2023)
14	Giannis Antetokounmpo	Basketball	Greece	1 (2024)
14	Lamar Jackson	American football	United States	1 (2024)
14	Joe Burrow	American football	United States	1 (2024)
14	Tyson Fury	Boxing	England; Republic of Ireland	1 (2025)
14	Juan Soto	Baseball	Dominican Republic	1 (2025)
14	Oleksandr Usyk	Boxing	Ukraine	1 (2025)
14	Lewis Hamilton	Auto racing	United Kingdom	1 (2026)

== See also ==
- List of professional sports leagues by revenue
- List of salaries
