= Parity (sports) =

Balance of talent between competing teams

In sports, parity refers to when participating teams have roughly equivalent levels of talent. In such a league, the "best" team is not significantly better than the "worst" team. This leads to more competitive contests in which the winner cannot be easily predicted. The opposite condition, which could be considered "disparity" between teams, is a condition in which the elite teams are so much more talented that the lesser teams are hopelessly outmatched.

In team sports, maintaining parity is considered to be essential to maintaining the overall financial performance of such sports. It is widely believed that fans enjoy watching games with uncertain outcomes, and conversely, they will tend to lose interest in a sport when they realize that the vast majority of the games are ending in predictable blowouts. Economists call this idea the uncertainty of outcome hypothesis (UOH), and it has been the subject of extensive research in behavioral economics.

== Methods ==
Different major governing organizations attempt to achieve financial and/or competitive parity in different ways. For example, the National Football League (NFL) in the US has established the shared revenue plan in which all teams equally benefit from television revenue and sales of NFL franchised goods. All major leagues of North America use a draft system to ensure that the best prospects are allocated to the teams that are the most in need of them. Ensuring parity is what American football fans are referring to when they often say that anyone can win or lose on any given Sunday.

In much of the world outside North America, parity is enforced through promotion and relegation: the weakest teams in a league are forcibly expelled from the league and switch places with the best teams in a lower league. An example of this is the B.League in Japan, which has two divisions, B1 and B2.

As of the 2020s, empirical evidence increasingly pointed to the conclusion that promotion and relegation, standing alone, was insufficient to ensure adequate parity in any given game. In the 2020s, because their lack of salary caps was causing too many games to end in blowouts, association football leagues were collectively bringing in annually only about two times the revenue of the National Football League (the wealthiest sports league in the world), even though association football had eight times the number of fans worldwide as American football.

Many consider the NFL to be the most "fair" or competitive league, with many different teams having a chance to win each year. In the NFL, complete parity would be a state in which on any given game, any given team can win any given game. The appearance of parity in the NFL over the course of the entire season may be something of an illusion; the New England Patriots, in particular, were noted for a prolonged dynasty in the 21st century under starting quarterback Tom Brady and head coach Bill Belichick, which league policies failed to break up, while their division rivals, the Buffalo Bills, simultaneously suffered through a 17-season playoff drought but may also have been harmed by Buffalo's small market, high taxes, and poor reputation as a destination city. A franchise may struggle because of ineptitude in talent evaluation, coaching, player development, organizational structure, or overall team and player operations. A league with parity would, in theory, allow such struggling teams to identify and fix those issues and ensure that a dynasty cannot take hold.

In 2023, NBA team owners and players agreed on a collective bargaining agreement (CBA) that introduced salary aprons and basketball-related penalties for violating them. This has led to less star players leaving in free agency for bigger markets and teams acquiring multiple stars. As of 2025, different NBA teams have won the championship since 2019 due to these rules, including teams from smaller markets. One downside to this however, is that NBA television ratings have declined.

== Expansion teams ==
Expansion teams are among the most difficult to bring to parity. Especially in sports for which team chemistry is an important factor in success, expansion team players, who consist mostly of cast-offs from other teams, must learn to work as a team before success happens, a process that can take years. Other times, expansion teams trade their best players to stronger teams while getting weaker players in return, as is the case with the Terrafirma Dyip and the Blackwater Bossing in the PBA. Two notable exceptions were the Baltimore Stallions, which reached the Grey Cup in both their seasons in the Canadian Football League and won in their latter appearance, and the Vegas Golden Knights, which reached the Stanley Cup Final in their inaugural season in the National Hockey League.

== Disparity ==
Examples of disparity in club football include the Portuguese Liga, the top-flight professional football (soccer) league in Portugal, in which three clubs have accounted for 75 of the 77 championships in league history, and the Scottish Premiership, where either Rangers F.C. and Celtic F.C. (described as the Old Firm) have won the championship for forty straight seasons, with either team taking the Premiership 86% of the time since its first season; only nineteen years have been won by another team, with Celtic dominating even in several recent seasons where Rangers were out of the league and relegated due to financial issues.

Salary cap limits set a maximum amount of money that may be spent on athletes' contracts. These limits exist to different extents in several other leagues as well. For example, Major League Baseball (MLB) in the U.S. does not have a cap but charges a luxury tax beyond a certain level.

Another example of disparity would be demonstrated by the NBA from the 2014–15 NBA season to the 2017–18 NBA season in which the Golden State Warriors and the Cleveland Cavaliers were the only franchises to reach the NBA Finals during that specific time span and, during the 2017 NBA Finals and the 2018 NBA Finals, the Warriors won 8 out of the possible 9 finals games. Other examples of NBA disparity include the Los Angeles Lakers and Boston Celtics winning a combined 35 championships, and the Chicago Bulls accomplishing a three-peat twice.

Prolonged disparity can be severely detrimental to a sports league. The All-America Football Conference collapsed in part because one of its teams, the Cleveland Browns, dominated the league throughout its four-year existence.

== See also ==
- List of highest paid Major League Baseball players
- List of largest sports contracts
- Freak show fights in mixed martial arts
- Balance of performance (BoP) in auto racing
