= Stephen Walsh (money manager) =

American fraudster

Stephen Walsh (born 1944) is an American former money manager who pleaded guilty to securities fraud.

Walsh and his business partner Paul Greenwood were arrested on February 24, 2009 for alleged securities fraud of between $550 million and $670 million. Walsh was a principal of Westridge Capital Management Inc. and chief financial executive of WG Trading Company, based in Greenwich, Connecticut. They were charged with scheming to defraud investors of $554 million. The scheme, which lasted from 1996 to 2009, defrauded investors, and involved unauthorized investments and the reporting of "arbitrary return rates" to investors that failed to account for losses. The scheme collapsed after the 2008 financial crisis and a National Futures Association audit that revealed promissory notes used by Greenwood and Walsh to account for losses and withdrawals. From 1991 to 2003, Walsh held a minority stake in the New York Islanders hockey team. Walsh lived in Sands Point on Long Island.

In April 2014, Walsh pleaded guilty in the U.S. District Court for the Southern District of New York with securities fraud, admitting false statements made to his firm's investors. After Judge Miriam Goldman Cedarbaum indicated that she was considering whether to impose a maximum 20-year prison sentence, Walsh considered withdrawing his guilty plea, but ultimately chose not to do so. Later in 2014, Cedarbaum sentenced Walsh to 20 years; Cedarbaum, who had earlier suffered a stroke, mistakenly believed that investors had not been made whole for their losses. On May 8, 2019, Judge Loretta Preska reduced Walsh's sentence by 15 years, granting him immediate release, based on her finding that Walsh had received ineffective assistance of counsel.
