= New York Islanders =

National Hockey League team in Elmont, New York

- 2026–27 New York Islanders season
- Conference: Eastern
- Division: Metropolitan
- Founded: 1972
- History: New York Islanders; 1972–present
- Home arena: UBS Arena
- City: Elmont, New York
- Team colors: Blue, orange, white
- Media: MSG Sportsnet; WEPN; WRHU; Audacy; WRCN-FM
- Owner(s): New York Islanders Hockey Club, L.P. (Scott D. Malkin, governor)
- General manager: Mathieu Darche
- Head coach: Peter DeBoer
- Captain: Bo Horvat
- Minor league affiliates: Hamilton Hammers (AHL); Trenton Ironhawks (ECHL)
- Stanley Cups: 4 (1979–80, 1980–81, 1981–82, 1982–83)
- Conference championships: 6 (1977–78, 1978–79, 1980–81, 1981–82, 1982–83, 1983–84) (Note: Regular season conference champion (1977–78, 1978–79, 1980–81) *Conference champion in playoffs (1981–82, 1982–83, 1983–84))
- Presidents' Trophies: 0 (Note: The Presidents' Trophy was not introduced until 1985–86. Had the trophy existed since league inception, the Islanders franchise would have won three Presidents' Trophies. The winning seasons would have been 1978–79, 1980–81, and 1981–82.)
- Division championships: 6 (1977–78, 1978–79, 1980–81, 1981–82, 1983–84, 1987–88)
- Official website: nhl.com/islanders

The New York Islanders (colloquially known as the Isles) are a professional ice hockey team based in Elmont, New York. The Islanders compete in the National Hockey League (NHL) as a member of the Metropolitan Division in the Eastern Conference. The team plays its home games at UBS Arena. The Islanders are one of three NHL franchises in the New York metropolitan area, along with the New Jersey Devils and New York Rangers, and their fanbase resides primarily on Long Island.

The team was founded in 1972 as part of the NHL's maneuvers to keep a team from rival league World Hockey Association (WHA) out of the newly built Nassau Coliseum in suburban Uniondale, New York. After two years of building up the team's roster, they found almost instant success by securing 14 straight playoff berths starting with their third season. The Islanders won four consecutive Stanley Cup championships between 1980 and 1983, the eighth of nine dynasties recognized by the NHL in its history. Their 19 consecutive playoff series wins between 1980 and 1984 is a feat that remains unparalleled in the history of professional sports. They are the last team in any major professional North American sport to win four consecutive championships, and to date the last NHL team to achieve a three-peat.

Following the team's dynasty era, the franchise ran into problems with money, ownership and management, an aging arena, and low attendance. Their woes were reflected on the ice, as the team has not won a division title since 1987–88, and went 22 seasons without winning a playoff series prior to the 2016 playoffs. After years of failed attempts to rebuild or replace Nassau Coliseum in suburban Long Island, the Islanders relocated to Barclays Center in Brooklyn following the 2014–15 season. In the 2018–19 and 2019–20 seasons, the Islanders split their home games between Barclays Center and Nassau Coliseum. The Islanders played all their home games in the 2020–21 season at Nassau Coliseum. Their new arena near Belmont Park was opened in 2021.

Ten former members of the Islanders have been inducted into the Hockey Hall of Fame, seven of whom—Mike Bossy, Clark Gillies, Denis Potvin, Billy Smith, Bryan Trottier, coach Al Arbour, and general manager Bill Torrey—were members of all four Cup-winning teams. Post-dynasty players Pat LaFontaine, Roberto Luongo, Pierre Turgeon, and Zdeno Chára were also inducted.

== History ==
=== The NHL heads to Long Island (1972–1974) ===
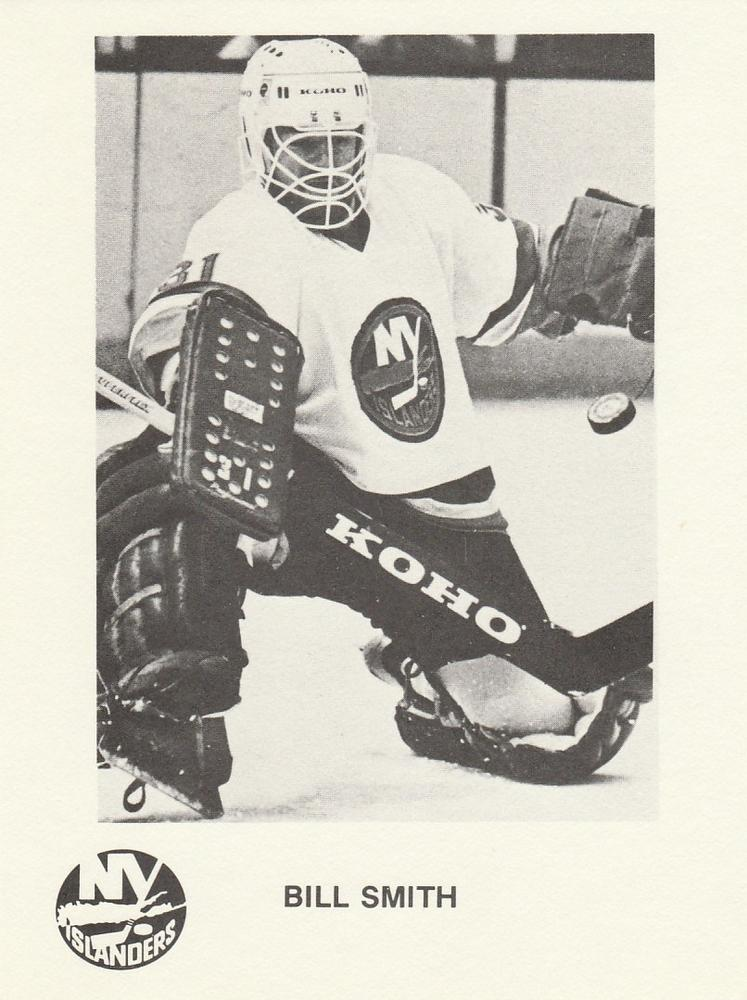
Billy Smith was acquired by the Islanders in the 1972 NHL expansion draft. He would win 304 games for the team as the starting goaltender for a majority of the games from 1972 to 1989, which included being the starting goaltender for 13 straight Stanley Cup playoff runs; he retired as the all-time leader in playoff wins with 88.

In fall 1972, the emerging World Hockey Association (WHA) planned to place its New York team, the New York Raiders, in Nassau County's brand-new Nassau Coliseum. County officials did not consider the WHA a major league and wanted to keep the Raiders out. William Shea, who had helped bring Major League Baseball's New York Mets to the area a decade earlier, was enlisted to bring an NHL team to Long Island. Although Shea had previously worked with upstart rival leagues including the aborted Continental League, the American Football League and the American Basketball Association, his ultimate goal in these efforts had always been to try to persuade the established leagues to grant second franchises to New York as had been the case with the Mets (and also with the New York Jets and New York Nets, as a result of those teams' leagues merging with their established rivals).

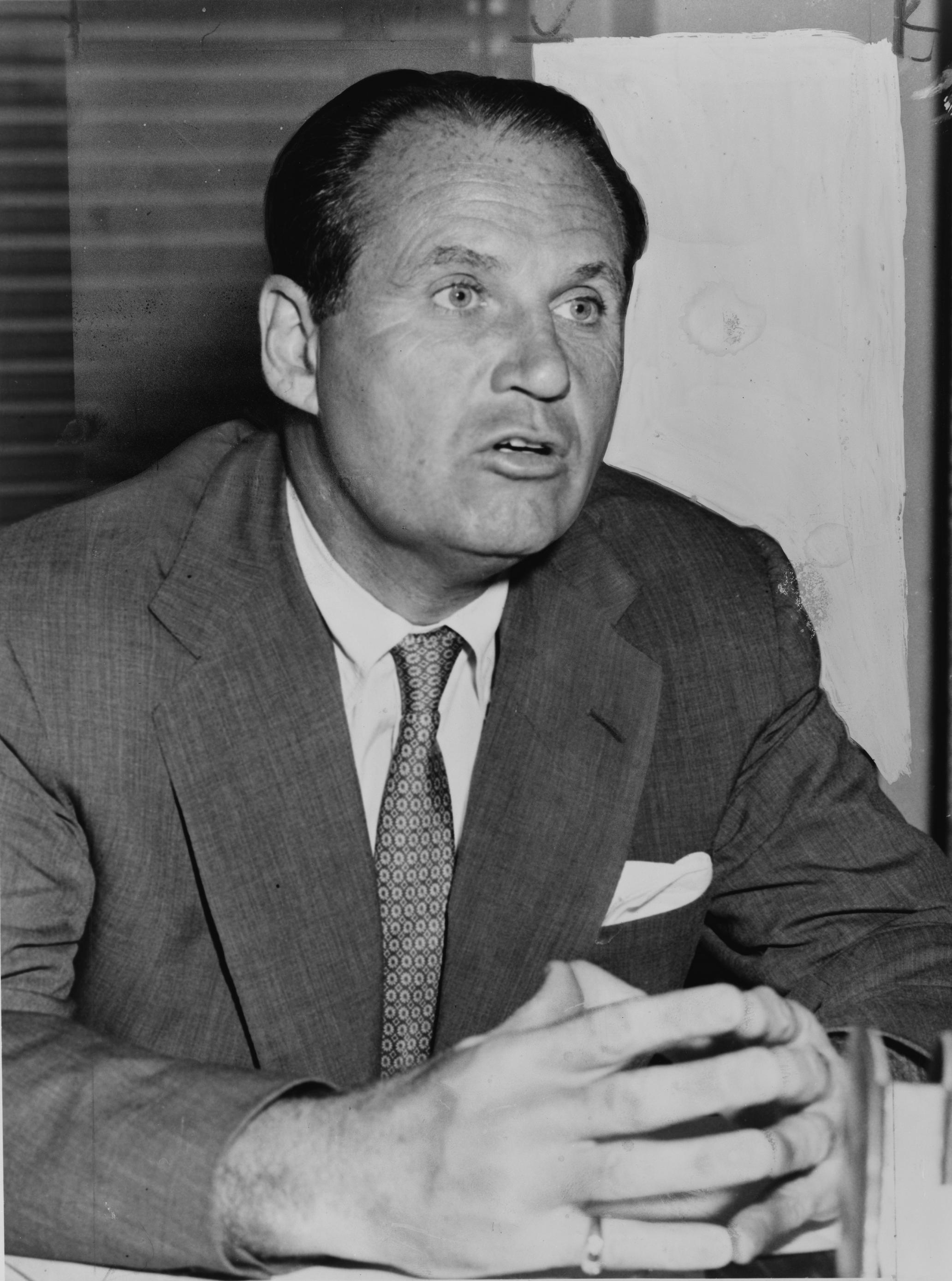
William Shea played a major role in bringing a hockey team to Long Island.

In contrast, Shea decided there was no need to work with the WHA since unlike the initial results of his previous approaches to established leagues in the other major sports, Shea immediately found NHL president Clarence Campbell to be receptive to adding a second team in New York. Nevertheless, the Islanders' bid faced opposition from the New York Rangers, who did not want additional competition in the New York area. Eventually, Campbell and Shea persuaded the Rangers' owners, Madison Square Garden, to reconsider. Rangers' president Bill Jennings weighed pros and cons. Another local NHL team would be compelled to compensate the Rangers for sharing the New York area. On the other hand, a WHA team would owe the Rangers nothing unless it was included in a potential NHL–WHA merger, a prospect to which both Campbell and Jennings were adamantly opposed. Finally, consenting to the establishment of an NHL franchise in suburban Nassau County would help to ensure the vast majority of the Rangers' fanbase within New York City proper would continue to support the older franchise, and reduced the prospect of a rival league eventually establishing a team and fanbase there. Perhaps remembering the crucial role the Jets had played in ensuring the success of the AFL just a few years earlier as a challenger of the National Football League, Jennings decided to help bring a new NHL team to the New York metropolitan area.

Despite expanding to 14 teams just two years prior, the NHL awarded a Long Island-based franchise to clothing manufacturer Roy Boe, owner of the American Basketball Association's New York Nets, on November 8, 1971. The terms included $6 million ($46.18 million in 2025 dollars) franchise fee plus a $5 million ($38.48 million in 2025 dollars) territorial fee to the Rangers. An expansion franchise was also given to Atlanta (the Flames) to keep the schedule balanced and to prevent the WHA from entering the growing market at the newly built Omni Coliseum.

The New York Islanders name was unveiled by the franchise on February 15, 1972, at a press conference held across the street from Roosevelt Raceway at a restaurant owned by Burt Bacharach. Many expected it to use the "Long Island Ducks", after the Eastern Hockey League team that played from 1959 to 1973. The team was soon nicknamed the "Isles" by the local newspapers. The Islanders' arrival effectively doomed the Raiders, who played in Madison Square Garden under difficult lease terms and were forced to move to Cherry Hill, New Jersey in the middle of their second season.

Former California Golden Seals executive vice president Bill Torrey was named as the team's general manager at the same press conference as the franchise's name unveiling. The Islanders secured veteran forward Ed Westfall, defenseman Gerry Hart, and goaltender Billy Smith in the 1972 expansion draft, along with junior ice hockey stars Billy Harris, Lorne Henning, and Bob Nystrom in the 1972 amateur draft. Soon after the draft, Phil Goyette was named as the team's first head coach, but was fired halfway through the season and replaced with Earl Ingarfield and assistant coach Aut Erickson. Unlike most other expansion teams' general managers, Torrey made few trades for veteran players in the early years, as he was committed to building the team through the draft. Torrey stated, "I told the owners that we're not going to beat this team next door by taking the castoffs from others teams. We'd have to develop our own stars." Before the season began, Westfall was named the team's first captain.

By September 1972, the Islanders were waiting for the Nassau Coliseum to be completed as well as their practice facility "The Royal Ice Rink" in Kings Park. The team was forced to practice as late as October 6, the day before their first game, at the Rangers practice rink in New Hyde Park.

The Islanders' first win came on October 12, 1972, in a 3–2 game against the Los Angeles Kings. In the team's first season, young players such as Smith, Nystrom, and Henning (all of whom would be part of the Islanders dynasty of the early 1980s) were given chances to prove themselves in the NHL. The young and inexperienced expansion team, however, posted a record of 12–60–6, setting an NHL record for most losses and worst overall record in a season. A highlight occurred on January 18, 1973, when they defeated the defending Stanley Cup champion Boston Bruins 9–7.

Finishing last in the standings that season, they received the right to select first in the 1973 draft. Off the ice, the Islanders struggled financially, a situation that was exacerbated by the then-unprecedented $11 million in franchise and territorial fees. Montreal Canadiens' general manager Sam Pollock was keen to acquire the Islanders' pick so he could draft French Canadian junior star defenseman Denis Potvin, who had been touted as "the next Bobby Orr" when he was 14 years old. Pollock made several lucrative trade offers including cash to the Islanders, but Torrey turned the Canadiens down and selected Potvin with the first overall pick. During the off-season, Torrey convinced former St. Louis Blues coach Al Arbour to come coach the Islanders. Even with Arbour as the team's head coach and Potvin, who won the Calder Memorial Trophy as NHL Rookie of the Year, the team again finished last in the East Division during the 1973–74 season, but allowed 100 fewer goals than the previous season. The season included their first win against the Rangers, on October 27, 1973, which also happened to be the game where Potvin scored his first NHL goal. Although they failed to make the playoffs, their 56 points represented a 26-point improvement from the previous season.

=== Ascendancy and playoff inability (1974–1979) ===
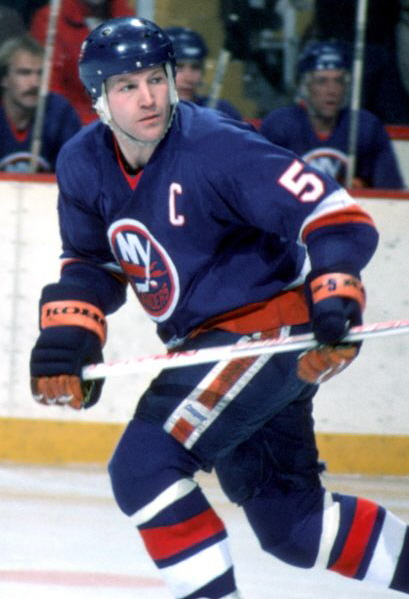
Denis Potvin led the Islanders to playoff success in the 1970s and 1980s.

With the 4th and 22nd picks in the 1974 draft, the Islanders added young forwards Clark Gillies and Bryan Trottier to continue Torrey's building plan. In the 1974–75 season, the Islanders made one of the biggest turnarounds in NHL history. Led by Potvin, forwards Westfall, Harris, Nystrom, Gillies, and goaltenders Smith and Glenn "Chico" Resch, the team earned 88 points, 32 more than the previous season and two more than their first two seasons combined, earning their first playoff berth. They defeated the rival New York Rangers in a best-of-3 first-round series as J. P. Parisé scored just 11 seconds into overtime of the third game. In the next round, down three games to none in a best-of-seven series against the Pittsburgh Penguins, the Islanders rallied to win the next four and take the series-winning game 7 on a late third-period goal by Westfall. Only four other major North American professional sports teams have accomplished this feat (the 1941–42 Toronto Maple Leafs, 2004 Boston Red Sox, the 2009–10 Philadelphia Flyers, and the 2013–14 Los Angeles Kings). They were close but not as lucky in the following round, rallying from another 3–0 deficit to force a seventh game against the defending Stanley Cup champion Philadelphia Flyers before the Flyers took the decisive seventh game at home and went on to win the Cup again. Despite a disappointing playoff finish, Arbour remained complimentary of the team's attitude and maturity, saying "If I called a practice next week, every one of them would show up."

The Islanders continued their climb up the standings in 1975–76, earning 101 points and the fifth-best record in the league. It was the first 100-point season in Islanders history, in only their fourth year of existence. Rookie center Trottier finished the season with 95 points and won the Calder Memorial Trophy; his points and assists (63) totals set a new league record for most in each category by a rookie. It would be the first of four consecutive 100-point seasons, including the first two division titles in franchise history. Despite the emergence of young star players and regular season success between 1976 and 1979 the Islanders suffered a series of playoff disappointments. In 1976 and 1977 Stanley Cup playoffs, the Islanders were knocked out in the semifinals by the eventual Stanley Cup champions, the Montreal Canadiens. The Canadiens posted a 24–3 record in the playoffs during those two seasons with all three losses coming at the hands of the Islanders.

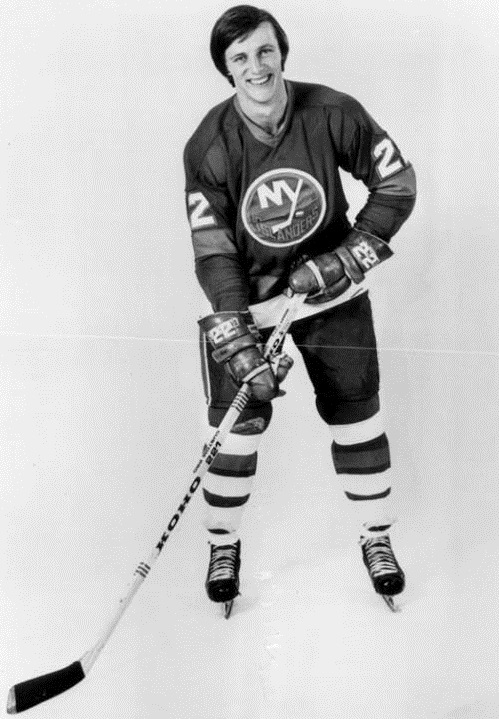
Mike Bossy was selected with the 15th overall pick in 1977 and became the third Islander to win the Calder Memorial Trophy.

In the 1977 draft, Torrey had the 15th overall pick and was deciding between forwards Mike Bossy and Dwight Foster. Bossy was known as an emerging scorer who lacked physicality. Foster was known as a solid checker with marginal offensive ability (despite having led the Ontario Hockey League in scoring). Arbour persuaded Torrey to pick Bossy, arguing it was easier to teach a scorer how to check. In the 1977–78 season, Bossy became the third Islander to win the Calder Trophy, and scored 53 goals that season, a rookie record at the time. The team earned their first Patrick Division and Campbell Conference championships. Six players finished the season with 30 goals scored or more, with five of them Islanders draft picks, showing the success of the draft building process. The season ended with a familiar result in the playoffs, as the team lost in overtime in game 7 of the quarterfinals against the Toronto Maple Leafs.

In 1978–79, the team finished with the best record in the NHL, clinching it with three goals in the third period of the season's final game against the Rangers. Trottier won the Hart Memorial Trophy as league MVP and captured the Art Ross Trophy for the most points, while sophomore Bossy scored 69 goals, which also led the league. Despite their regular season dominance, the Islanders exited the playoffs with another upset playoff loss, this time to the Rangers in the semifinals. As the team was leaving Madison Square Garden following their game 6 elimination, Rangers fans rocked and threw objects at the team's bus. Hockey professionals and journalists generally questioned whether the Islanders were capable of winning the important games needed to win a Stanley Cup championship. Islander players would cite fear of repeating the pain of this loss as spurring their later success. After transferring the captaincy to Gillies the season before, Westfall retired and shortly thereafter became a color commentator on the team's telecasts.

Off the ice, the Islanders were on shaky ground. Boe was losing money on both his franchises, even as the Islanders quickly surged to NHL prominence and the Nets became an ABA power. The Islanders were still far behind on the $10 million they had paid in startup costs, and the expansion and territorial fees associated with moving the Nets to the National Basketball Association threw Boe's finances into a tailspin. Eventually, Boe was forced to sell both his teams. He readily found a buyer for the Nets, but had less luck finding one for the Islanders. Torrey orchestrated a sale to one of the team's limited partners, John Pickett. In return, Pickett promoted Torrey to team president, though Torrey had already been operating head of the franchise before then. Soon after purchasing the team, Pickett signed a very lucrative cable television contract with the fledgling SportsChannel network as their owner, Charles Dolan, thought the up-and-coming Islanders would be a perfect centerpiece for his new network. Dolan gave Pickett a long-term guaranteed contract intended not only to keep the team on Long Island, but give area governments an incentive to renew his cable contracts. The Islanders have remained on the network, now known as MSG Sportsnet, for over four decades.

=== The Dynasty (1979–1983) ===
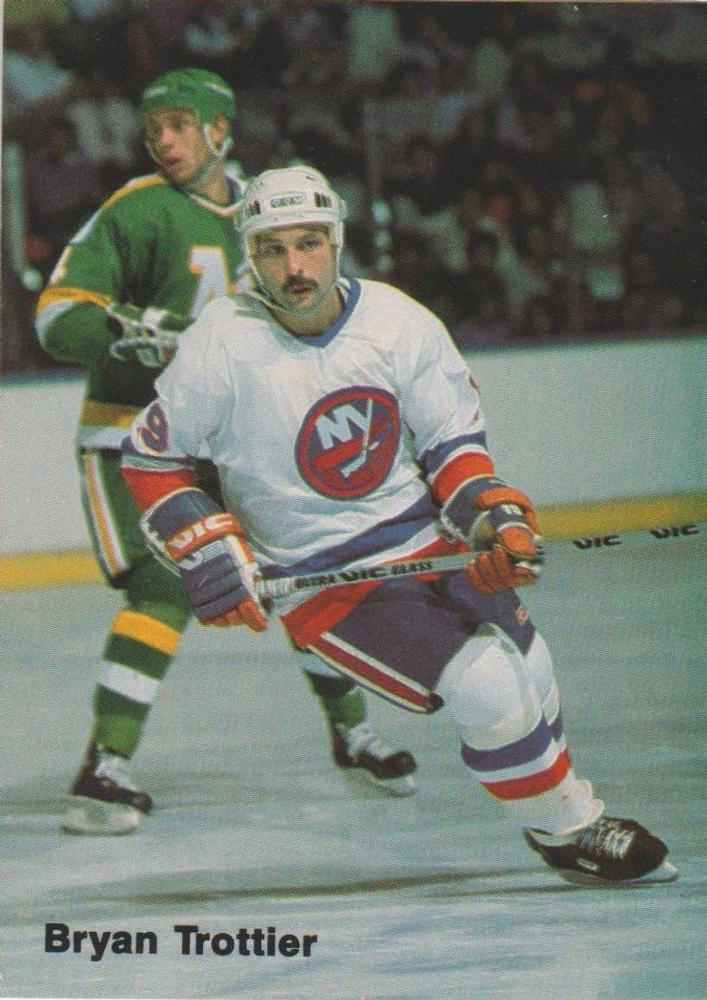
Bryan Trottier won the Conn Smythe Trophy for his postseason play in 1980 as the Islanders won the first of their four Stanley Cup championships. He won each of the following for the Islanders: the Calder Trophy (1976), Art Ross Trophy (1979), Hart (1979), Conn Smythe (1980), and the King Clancy Memorial Trophy (1989); no Islander has won the Art Ross or Hart Memorial Trophy other than Trottier.

After the Islanders' regular season dominance and playoff disappointment in 1979, Arbour decided that he would no longer concern himself too greatly with his team's finish in the regular season. Instead, he focused his team's energy on how they would perform in the playoffs. In 1980, the Islanders dropped below the 100-point mark for the first time in five years, earning only 91 points. However, they finally broke through and won the Stanley Cup.

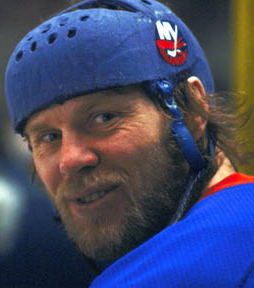
Before the 1980 playoffs, the Islanders acquired Butch Goring from the Los Angeles Kings. Goring's arrival was often called the "final piece of the puzzle."

Before the playoffs, Torrey made the difficult decision to trade longtime and popular veterans Billy Harris and defenseman Dave Lewis to the Los Angeles Kings for second line center Butch Goring. Goring's arrival is often called the "final piece of the puzzle"; a strong two-way player, his presence on the second line ensured that opponents would no longer be able to focus their defensive efforts on the Islanders' first line of Bossy, Trottier and Clark Gillies. Contributions from new teammates, such as wingers Duane Sutter and Anders Kallur and stay-at-home defensemen Dave Langevin, Gord Lane, and Ken Morrow (the latter fresh off a gold medal win at the 1980 Winter Olympics), also figured prominently in the Islanders' playoff success.

In the 1980 playoffs, the Islanders defeated the Los Angeles Kings 3–1 in the preliminary round, then beat the Boston Bruins 4–1 in the quarterfinals. In the semifinals, the Islanders faced the Buffalo Sabres, who had finished second overall in the NHL standings. The Islanders won the first two games in Buffalo, including a 2–1 victory in game two on Bob Nystrom's goal in double overtime. They went on to win the series in six games and reach the Stanley Cup Final for the first time in franchise history, where they would face the NHL's regular season champions, the Philadelphia Flyers, who had gone undefeated for 35 straight games (25–0–10) during the regular season. In game one in Philadelphia, the Islanders won 4–3 on Denis Potvin's power-play goal in overtime. Leading the series 3–2, they went home to Long Island for game six. In that game the Islanders blew a 4–2 lead in the third period but Nystrom continued his overtime heroics, scoring at 7:11 of the extra frame, on assists by John Tonelli and Lorne Henning, to bring Long Island its first Stanley Cup championship. This was the most recent Stanley Cup-clinching game won in overtime by the home team until the Los Angeles Kings did it in 2014. It was also the Islanders' sixth overtime victory of the playoffs. Bryan Trottier won the Conn Smythe Trophy as the most valuable player in the playoffs. Torrey's strategy of building through the draft turned out very well; nearly all of the major contributors on the 1980 champions were home-grown Islanders or had spent most of their NHL careers in the Islanders organization. The Islanders were the first NHL team to win the Stanley Cup with Europeans (Stefan Persson and Kallur) on its roster.

The Islanders dominated the next two seasons. Bossy scored 50 goals in 50 games in 1981 and the Islanders lost only three playoff games en route to defeating the Minnesota North Stars in five games to win the Stanley Cup. Goring won the Conn Smythe Trophy. During their semifinals sweep of the Rangers, Islanders' fans began taunting the Rangers with a chant of "1940!" – referring to the Rangers' last Stanley Cup win in 1940 (the Rangers would not win the cup again until 1994). Fans in other NHL cities soon picked up the chant.

These four banners hung in Nassau Veterans Memorial Coliseum and represent the four Stanley Cup championships the Islanders won from 1980 through 1983.

In 1981–82, the Islanders won a then-record 15 straight games en route to a franchise-record 118 points, while Mike Bossy set a scoring record for right-wingers with 147 points in an 80-game schedule. The Islanders finished with the most points in the league (118), yet once in the playoffs against the Pittsburgh Penguins they found themselves down late in the third period of deciding game 5 before John Tonelli scored both the tying goal and the overtime winner. After defeating the Rangers in six games they swept both the Quebec Nordiques and the Vancouver Canucks in the first-ever coast-to-coast Stanley Cup Final for their third straight championship. During that series Bossy, upended by a check from Tiger Williams and falling parallel to the ice, managed to hook the puck with his stick and score. Bossy netted the Stanley Cup-winning goal and was awarded the Conn Smythe Trophy.

The next year, although the Islanders had won the Stanley Cup three straight times, more attention was being paid to the upstart Edmonton Oilers, whose young superstar Wayne Gretzky had just shattered existing scoring records. In 1982–83 the Oilers had a better regular season, but the Islanders swept them in the Stanley Cup Final to win their fourth straight championship. Billy Smith was named the Conn Smythe Trophy winner after shutting down the Oilers' vaunted scoring machine. Gretzky failed to score a goal during the series. Duane and Brent Sutter scored seven and five points respectively in the first three games, while Bossy again scored the Stanley Cup-winning goal in game four. After that game, the Oilers players walked past the Islanders' dressing room and were surprised to see the champions exhausted. Oilers players such as Gretzky and Mark Messier said that they realized at that moment how much it would actually take to win the Stanley Cup.

=== Post-dynasty and the Easter Epic (1983–1991) ===
The Islanders finished the 1983–84 regular season tied atop the Prince of Wales Conference while successfully defending their Patrick Division title. The "Drive for Five" got off to a tense start. Late in the deciding game of their first-round series against the Rangers, Don Maloney tied the game with a controversial goal as the Islanders believed Maloney's stick was too high. They ultimately eliminated the Rangers for the fourth consecutive year. The team then defeated the Washington Capitals in five games and the Montreal Canadiens in six to set up a Stanley Cup Final rematch with the Oilers. The 1984 Stanley Cup Final featured rookie Pat LaFontaine scoring two third-period goals in 38 seconds. This time, the Oilers dethroned the Islanders to win the first of what would be five Stanley Cup victories in seven years. For the 1984 playoffs, the NHL changed the home and away schedule for the Stanley Cup Final series, which provided the Islanders home-ice advantage in the series based on Wales Conference teams collectively having a winning record in regular season games versus Campbell Conference opponents, despite finishing lower than them in the overall standings. The new format had them play three straight games in Edmonton, where the Oilers managed to lock up the series, after the teams had split the first two games in New York. Bossy cited the team's hard time winning an away game as their downfall in the series. The Oilers also ended the Islanders' 19-series playoff winning streak. It remains the longest streak in the history of professional sports (one more than the 1959–1967 streak by the Boston Celtics of the NBA). Unlike the 1976–1979 Montreal Canadiens, who needed to win three series in the 1976 and 1977 playoffs under the playoff format in place at that time, the Islanders had to win four series in each of their Stanley Cup seasons.

The Islanders remained competitive for the rest of the decade, even as some of the stars from the Cup teams departed. As the decade wore on, Pickett began to keep the money from the team's cable deal rather than reinvest it in the team as he had done in years past. Although it did not become clear immediately, the lack of funds limited Torrey's ability to replace all of the departing talent. In the 1984–85 NHL season, the Islanders slipped to third in their division, followed by similar results in the 1985–86 and 1986–87 seasons. They began facing stiff competition from division rivals, the Philadelphia Flyers, who eliminated the Islanders in the division finals in 1985 and 1987, and the Capitals, who swept the Islanders' 1986 first-round series, the team's first exit without winning a playoff round since 1978.

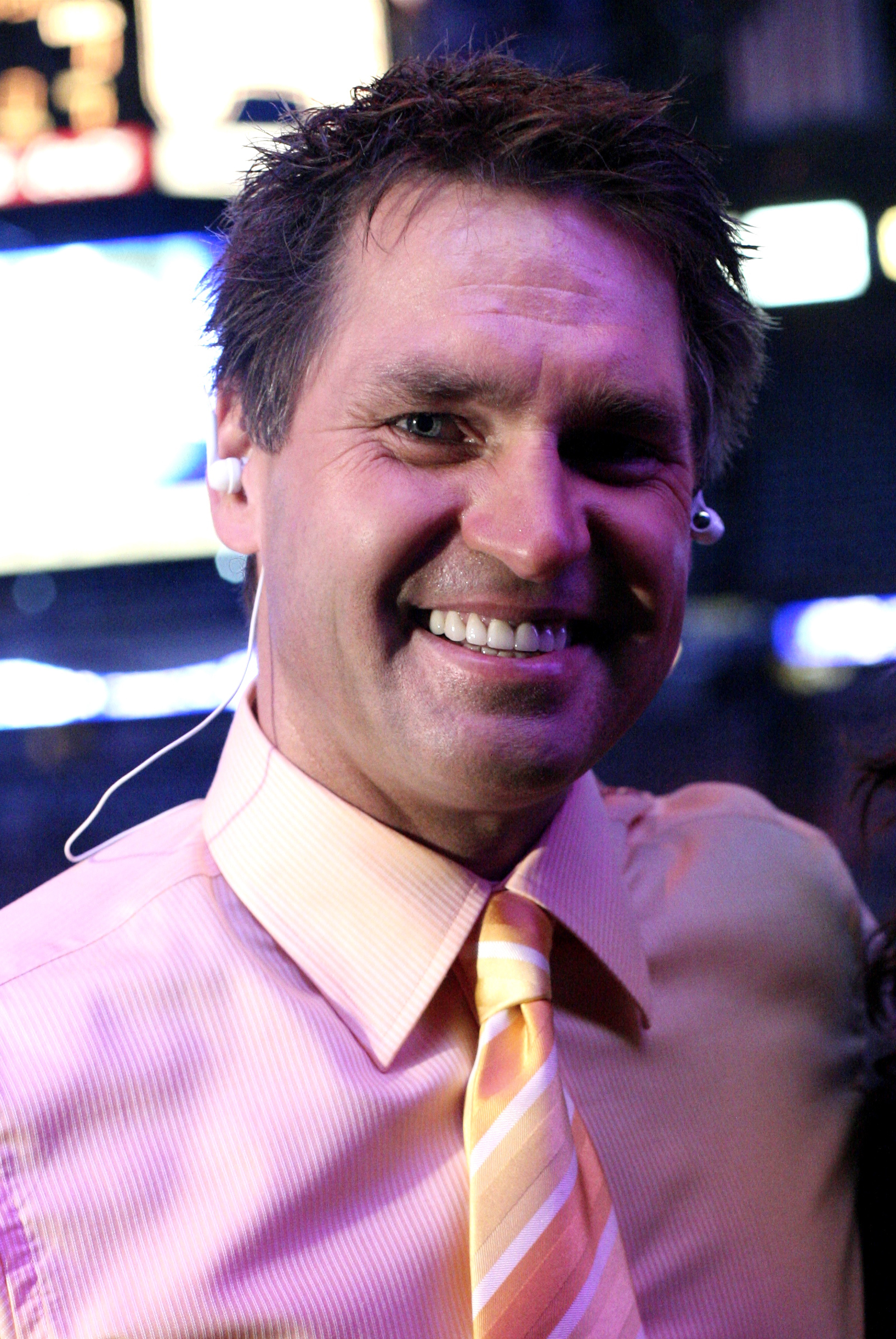
Kelly Hrudey (pictured in 2006) saved 73 of 75 shots in the "Easter Epic" for the Islanders, who came out victorious after four periods of overtime play.

In 1986, Nystrom retired due to a serious injury and Clark Gillies was picked up on waivers by the Buffalo Sabres. Arbour retired as coach following the 1985–86 season and was replaced by longtime junior hockey coach Terry Simpson. During the first round of the 1987 playoffs against the Capitals, the Islanders had fallen behind in the series three games to one but were not eliminated due to a playoff format change from a best-of-5 series to a best-of-7. The Islanders evened the series, which set the stage for one of the most famous games in NHL history: the "Easter Epic". Kelly Hrudey stopped 73 shots on goal while Pat LaFontaine scored at 8:47 of the fourth overtime—and at 1:56 a.m. on Easter Sunday morning. The win came even though the Islanders had been outshot 75–52. They were eliminated in the division finals in seven games by the Flyers. Chronic back pain forced Mike Bossy to retire after the season.

The following season, the Islanders captured another division title, but were defeated in the first round of the playoffs by the upstart New Jersey Devils. Potvin retired after the playoffs, holding records for most career goals (310), assists (742) and points (1052) by a defenseman, though he has since been passed in these categories by Ray Bourque and Paul Coffey. Around this time, the team's run of good luck in the draft began to run out. Of their four top draft picks from 1987 to 1990, they lost one to a freak knee injury and two others never panned out.

The 1988–89 season saw the Islanders win only seven of their first 27 games. Torrey fired Simpson and brought Arbour back. Arbour was unable to turn things around, and the team finished with 61 points, tied with the Quebec Nordiques for the worst record in the league. It was their first losing season and the first time missing the playoffs since their second season. Smith, the last remaining original Islanders player, retired after the season to become the team's goaltending coach. Not long after the end of the season, Pickett moved to Florida and turned day-to-day operations over to a committee of four Long Island entrepreneurs: Ralph Palleschi, Bob Rosenthal, Stephen Walsh, and Paul Greenwood. In return, they each bought a 2.5% interest in the team. In the next season, the Islanders rebounded to get back into the playoffs, but fell to the Rangers in five games of the opening round. The team bought out the remaining years of Bryan Trottier's contract, sending him off with a team record of games played. The 1990–91 season had the team finish well out of the playoffs after winning only 25 games.

=== New faces and the 1993 run (1991–1995) ===
LaFontaine was frustrated with the team's lack of success and the progress of his contract negotiations, and held out rather than report to camp before 1991–92. In response to the holdout, Torrey engineered a rebuilding project with two blockbuster trades on October 25, 1991. He dealt LaFontaine, Randy Wood and Randy Hillier (along with future considerations) to the Buffalo Sabres in return for Pierre Turgeon, Benoît Hogue, Uwe Krupp and Dave McLlwain. He also sent longtime captain Brent Sutter and Brad Lauer to the Chicago Blackhawks for Steve Thomas and Adam Creighton. With these additions and a talented core of players such as Derek King, Ray Ferraro, and Patrick Flatley, along with incoming Soviet players Vladimir Malakhov and Darius Kasparaitis, the Islanders had a new foundation in the early 1990s. The management committee, however, was not nearly as patient as Boe and Pickett had been, and forced Torrey to resign after the Islanders missed the playoffs again that season. Assistant general manager Don Maloney was hired in Torrey's place, while Torrey quickly resurfaced with the expansion Florida Panthers.

In Maloney's first year, 1992–93, the Islanders rebounded to make the playoffs, in the process surpassing the 80-point mark for the first time in five years. The LaFontaine-Turgeon trade proved successful for both the Islanders and Sabres, as both players hit career highs in points and Turgeon won the Lady Byng Trophy.

Ray Ferraro emerged as a playoff hero, scoring a pair of overtime winners in the first-round series against the Capitals. Instead of celebrating after winning game 6 at Nassau Coliseum, however, the Islanders were both irate and despondent. Only seconds after Turgeon, the team's star center and leading scorer, scored an insurance goal in the series-clinching game, Dale Hunter violently checked him from behind, which caused a full scale brawl between both teams. Turgeon was believed to be out for the entire second round, if not longer, with a separated shoulder. He returned only for spot power-play duty in the last game of the second round. Hunter received a 21-game suspension the following season. At the time, it was the longest suspension for on-ice misconduct in modern NHL history.

The Islanders' next opponent, the Pittsburgh Penguins, were twice-defending Stanley Cup champions and full of stars such as Mario Lemieux, Jaromír Jágr, and Ron Francis. The Penguins had roared through the regular season with 119 points, as well as recording a record 17 consecutive wins towards the end of the season, and were overwhelmingly favored to win a third straight championship. Jim Smith of Newsday predicted that with Turgeon on the sidelines, the Penguins would sweep the Islanders out of the playoffs, however on the strength of outstanding goaltending from Glenn Healy and contributions from all four lines, the Islanders achieved a huge upset when David Volek scored at 5:16 of overtime of the deciding seventh game. Newsday's front page the day following the win was a picture of Healy with a headline reading, "It's a Miracle!" This was the last playoff series won by the Islanders for 23 years, until the 2015–16 season. Turgeon returned to the Islanders' top line for the conference finals against the Montreal Canadiens, though he was not in peak form as he had not fully recovered. The Islanders bowed out of the playoffs after a hard-fought five games, two of which went to overtime. After beating the Islanders, the Canadiens went on to win the Cup.

Maloney had avoided making many personnel changes his first year, but on the eve of the 1993 expansion draft he traded backup goaltender Mark Fitzpatrick to the Quebec Nordiques for Ron Hextall. The clubs also exchanged first-round picks in the deal. Able to protect only one netminder in the expansion draft, the Islanders left Healy exposed. He was claimed by the Mighty Ducks of Anaheim, then was claimed by the Tampa Bay Lightning in Phase II of the draft the next day, and finally had his rights traded to the Rangers, where he became the backup.

The Islanders barely squeezed past the Panthers to make the 1994 playoffs before being swept in a lopsided opening series by the first-place Rangers, who went on to win the Cup. It would be the Islanders' last playoff appearance until 2002. Arbour retired for good as coach and was succeeded by longtime assistant Lorne Henning. Hextall, who allowed 16 goals in three games, drew most of the criticism for the failed playoff campaign and was shipped to Philadelphia for Tommy Söderström in September. In the lockout-shortened 1994–95 season, the Islanders not only failed to qualify for the playoffs, they finished ahead of only the third-year Ottawa Senators.

=== Management issues (1995–2000) ===
By the end of the 1994–95 season, Maloney was under considerable heat from the press and fan base for his handling of the team. Since taking over in 1992, the only noticeable attempt he made to upgrade the roster was the acquisition of Hextall. Near the end of the failed 1995 campaign, Maloney decided that the core of players he had left alone for three seasons needed to be revamped, leading to a rebuilding project. He traded Turgeon and Malakhov to the Montreal Canadiens for Kirk Muller and Mathieu Schneider, while Hogue was sent to Toronto for young goaltender Éric Fichaud. Additionally, Maloney allowed the team's leading scorer, Ferraro, to depart as an unrestricted free agent at the conclusion of the season. Fans' displeasure at Maloney for trading the popular Turgeon was magnified when Muller balked at joining a rebuilding team. He played 45 games for the Islanders before being sent to Toronto as well.

Before the 1995–96 season, Maloney fired Henning and named Mike Milbury head coach. The same year, the Islanders' attempt at updating their look resulted in the unveiling of a new team logo of a slicker-clad fisherman holding a hockey stick. Islanders fans disliked it, and rival Rangers' fans mockingly called the Islanders "fishsticks"—mocking how the logo resembled the Gorton's Fisherman. The team reverted to a modified version of the old logo as soon as the league allowed them to do so. (In spite of this, the logo found renewed popularity as a throwback design in the late 2010s and early 2020s, enough so that the team would revive it as their third "Reverse Retro" jersey in 2022 and would use an adjusted version of the logo for their AHL team, the Bridgeport Islanders, beginning in 2024.) The year was a disappointment on the ice as well, as the Islanders finished in last place with a record of 22–50–10. During the season, team management fired Maloney, whom fans blamed for the team's downfall, and gave Milbury full control of hockey operations as both a coach and general manager. Milbury went on to resign as head coach during the following season and elevated assistant Rick Bowness to the position. After another unsuccessful season with little improvement, Milbury took over as coach again during the 1997–98 season. The team improved to fourth place in their division but again failed to make the playoffs. Milbury followed by once again stepping down as coach during the following season while retaining his job as general manager.

During the continued playoff drought, instability in the front office mirrored the Islanders' substandard performance on the ice. Pickett sold the team to Dallas businessman John Spano in 1996. However, three months after the 1997 closing, Spano had only paid Pickett a fraction of the first installment on the cable rights deal. Several Islanders executives tipped off Newsday that something was amiss about their new boss. In July, Newsday exposed Spano as a fraud who did not have the assets required to complete the deal. The investigation showed that Spano had deliberately misled the NHL and the Islanders about his net worth, and also had two lawsuits pending against him. Within days of the report, Spano was forced to relinquish the team to Pickett. Federal prosecutors turned up evidence that Spano had forged many of the documents used to vouch for his wealth and to promise payment to Pickett, going as far as to fax many of the documents from his own office in Dallas. He was sentenced to 71 months in prison for bank and wire fraud. The NHL took additional heat when reports surfaced that the league spent well under $1,000 (depending on the source, the league spent either $525 or $750) to check Spano's background. It subsequently stiffened the process for vetting future owners. The incident and its aftermath were covered in the ESPN 30 for 30 documentary, Big Shot. Pickett finally found a buyer, a group led by Howard Milstein and Phoenix Coyotes co-owner Steven Gluckstern, a deal which almost fell through when Spectacor Management Group, which managed the Coliseum for Nassau County, tried to force Pickett to certify that the Coliseum was safe. Pickett refused, since the Coliseum had fallen into disrepair in recent seasons. SMG backed down under pressure from the Islanders, the NHL, and Nassau County officials.

Initially, the team made numerous trades and increased their payroll in an effort to assemble a better team. In one transaction, young players Todd Bertuzzi and Bryan McCabe were traded for veteran Trevor Linden. After the Islanders finished 12 points short of the playoffs in the 1997–98 season, however, Milstein and Gluckstern decided to run the team on an austere budget in an attempt to make a profit. They also complained about the condition of the Nassau Coliseum and made noises about moving the team elsewhere. They began trading or releasing many popular players to avoid paying their salaries, including star scorer Žigmund Pálffy, team captain Linden, former rookie of the year Bryan Berard, and rugged defenseman Rich Pilon. Losing the highly regarded players, the team finished with similar results the next two seasons. Attendance, which had been in a steady decline over the past few years, decreased even further to under 12,000 per game. Around that time, Milstein bid hundreds of millions of dollars in unsuccessful attempts to purchase the National Football League's Washington Redskins and Cleveland Browns.

=== New ownership and a return to the playoffs (2000–2006) ===
Let's face it, the Coliseum is a dump, and the team, well, they're losers. It's a real shame. We want to see it change because this is our home. We all deserve better.

— Charles Wang

In 2000, Milstein and Gluckstern sold the team to Computer Associates executives Charles Wang and Sanjay Kumar. The sale cost $187.5 million ($350.54 million in 2025 dollars) and gave fans hope for the team to turn its lack of success around. The new owners allowed Milbury to spend money and invest in free agents. His first attempt proved unpopular with fans, as he traded away future star players Roberto Luongo and Olli Jokinen to the Florida Panthers for Oleg Kvasha and Mark Parrish. Milbury then further surprised the hockey world when he took Rick DiPietro with the first selection in the 2000 draft, ahead of consensus picks Dany Heatley and Marián Gáborík. Reporters and fans were alternately confused and enraged by the moves, which Milbury acknowledged, saying, "As dangerous as this may be, we think Mad Mike maybe has something going for him." Establishing a record of controversial decisions, Milbury held onto the "Mad Mike" nickname for years to follow. He remained adamant that his moves were to immediately improve the team, whose poor winning percentage that year was ahead of only the franchise's first season. The team's uninspired play led Milbury to fire head coach and past player Butch Goring. Fans vocalized their dislike of Goring taking the fall rather than Milbury, which was further worsened when Milbury passed on hiring Ted Nolan as Goring's successor; Instead, Boston Bruins assistant coach Peter Laviolette was hired.

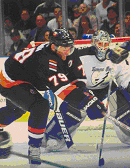
The Islanders acquired Alexei Yashin (left) prior to the 2001–02 season. Yashin would go on to become the team's captain in later years.

Three key personnel acquisitions were made prior to the 2001–02 season, Laviolette's first. Alexei Yashin was acquired from the Ottawa Senators in exchange for forward Bill Muckalt, defenseman Zdeno Chára and the Islanders' second overall pick in the 2001 draft. Next, Islanders prospects Tim Connolly and Taylor Pyatt were traded to the Buffalo Sabres in exchange for Michael Peca, who became the team's captain. By virtue of finishing with the worst record in the previous season, Detroit Red Wings goaltender Chris Osgood was the next addition, taken as the first pick in the September 2001 waiver draft, adding a former Stanley Cup championship goaltender without giving up any players in exchange. The additions proved to be a great help, as the team opened the season with a 9–0–1–1 record, the best in franchise history. They finished the season with new broken records; their 96 points marked the fourth biggest one-year turnaround in the league's history (44 points higher than the previous season), while Osgood's 66 starts surpassed Ron Hextall's previous record of 65. During the 2002 Stanley Cup playoffs, they were seeded fifth and faced the fourth-seeded Toronto Maple Leafs. The Islanders lost in a very physical first-round series in seven games; the home team won every game of the series. Notably, game 5 featured Gary Roberts charging Islander defenseman Kenny Jönsson, and Darcy Tucker submarining Peca with a questionable check that tore the Islander captain's anterior cruciate ligament, sidelining both players for the series' final game. The situation between Tucker and Peca caused a bit of outrage, with speculation that Tucker had intended to injure Peca before the game had begun, which Tucker denied.

Despite the promise shown in the Toronto playoff series, the Islanders had a slow start to the 2002–03 season. They rebounded to make the playoffs, but lost a five-game series in the first round to the top-seeded Ottawa Senators. Milbury continued his controversial move-making by firing Laviolette after the season, citing postseason interviews with the players in which they expressed a lack of confidence in the coach. He was replaced with Steve Stirling, who had previously been coaching the team's top minor league affiliate, the Bridgeport Sound Tigers. In the following season, the Islanders again lost in the first round of the playoffs, this time to the eventual champion Tampa Bay Lightning.

Following the 2004–05 NHL lockout, which eliminated that season of play, the Islanders made several player moves to increase offense for following season. Peca was traded to the Edmonton Oilers for center Mike York, freeing up room under the NHL's new salary cap. The same day, the team signed winger Miroslav Šatan to play alongside Yashin. Milbury also worked on remaking the team's defense, adding Alexei Zhitnik, Brad Lukowich and Brent Sopel to replace the departed Adrian Aucoin and Roman Hamrlík, who left as free agents, and Jonsson, who left the NHL to play in the HockeyAllsvenskan in Sweden. In the aftermath, Yashin was named as the team's new captain. The team's inconsistent play led to Stirling's dismissal midway through the season.

=== Management shake-ups and the DiPietro contract (2006–2009) ===
On the day of Stirling's firing, January 11, 2006, Milbury also announced that he would step down as general manager once a successor was found. He served as vice president of Wang's sports properties for one year before resigning in May 2007. Wang proceeded by hiring Neil Smith as general manager and Ted Nolan as head coach, following a brief stint by Brad Shaw as the team's interim head coach. Smith, however, was fired after approximately one month and quickly replaced by the team's backup goaltender Garth Snow, who retired from his playing career to accept the position. Before his dismissal, Smith made several free agent acquisitions, including defensemen Brendan Witt and Tom Poti, and forwards Mike Sillinger and Chris Simon.

On September 12, 2006, the Islanders signed DiPietro to a 15-year, $67.5 million ($107.8 million in 2025 dollars) contract, which was believed to be the longest contract to date in the NHL and the second-longest in North American sports, behind a 25-year contract for National Basketball Association player Magic Johnson. DiPietro, Wang and Snow all spoke confidently and felt it was the best move for both sides, despite the mixed reactions it received from the rest of the hockey world. Specifically, Wang stated, "This is not a big deal. You have to have a commitment to who you're working with." As speculation began as to whether other teams would follow suit and give lengthy contracts to star players, Atlanta Thrashers' general manager Don Waddell felt that, "It's highly unlikely that you will see teams go beyond that. This is a once-in-a-lifetime contract. Ownership must feel very strongly that he's their guy for the next 15 years."

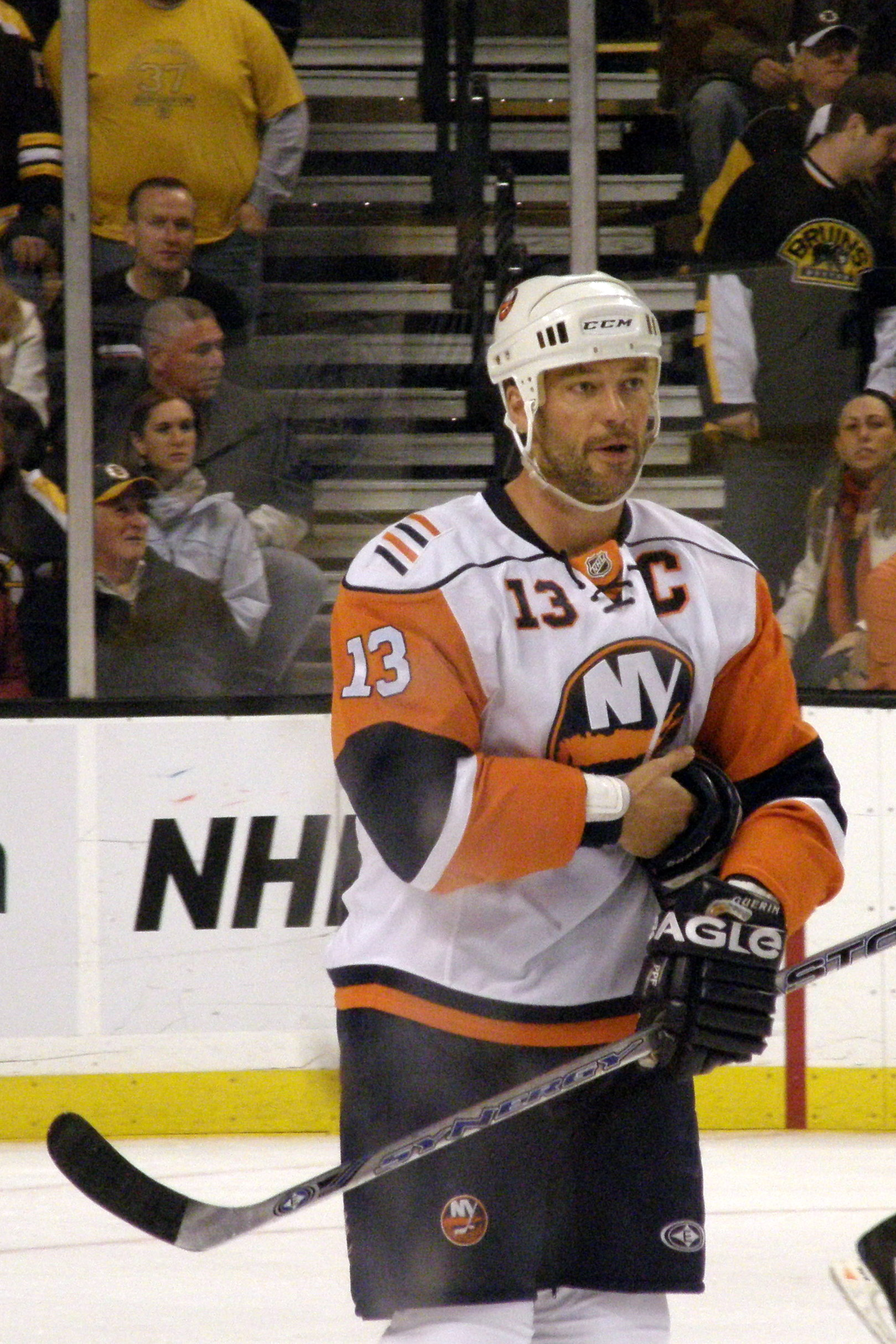
Bill Guerin was the team captain from 2007 to 2009.

The new-look Islanders were picked by most analysts to languish towards the bottom of the standings. Eyeing a playoff spot, Snow traded for forward Ryan Smyth from the Edmonton Oilers at the trade deadline on February 27, 2007. Injuries to DiPietro provided extra setbacks, but not enough to drop the team from playoff contention. They qualified for the playoffs, assisted by a late-season winning streak and a 3–2 shootout victory against the New Jersey Devils in their final regular season game. Despite DiPietro's return to the team in time for the playoffs, the team lost their first round matchup in five games to the Presidents' Trophy-winning Buffalo Sabres.

Management announced in June 2007 that they would buy out captain Alexei Yashin's contract, which had four seasons remaining on it. Free agents Smyth, Poti, Viktor Kozlov, Jason Blake, and Richard Zedník also left in July 2007. During that month, the Islanders signed Bill Guerin to a two-year contract as he immediately assumed team captaincy. Also in the off-season, free agents Mike Comrie, Andy Sutton and Jon Sim joined the team. That summer, it was announced that Nolan extended an invitation to Al Arbour to return as a coach for one game in order to bring his total number of games coached to 1,500. Arbour signed a one-day contract, the shortest in league history, on November 3, 2007; it put him behind the bench the following day as the Islanders defeated the Pittsburgh Penguins 3–2, raising his career coaching win total to 740. The team remained in the playoff hunt through the trade deadline as they re-signed Comrie to a one-year contract and traded away Simon and Marc-André Bergeron. A rash of injuries saw them plummet to the fifth-worst record in the league by the end of the season.

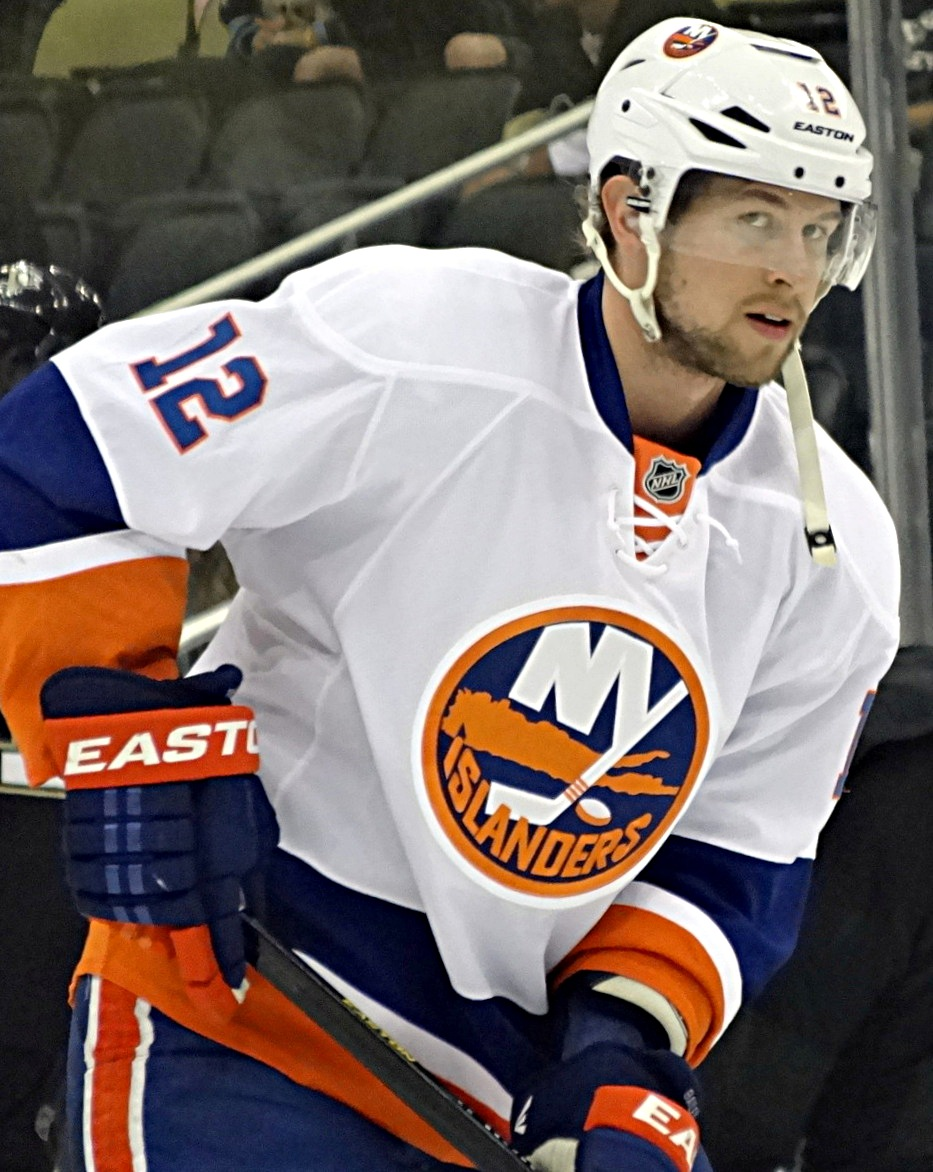
Josh Bailey was drafted by the Islanders in 2008, to provide depth at the wing for the team.

At the 2008 NHL entry draft, the Islanders made two trades to move down from the fifth to the ninth overall pick, with which they selected center Josh Bailey. They also added free agents Mark Streit and Doug Weight. The team dismissed head coach Ted Nolan over alleged philosophy differences, and later that summer replaced him with Scott Gordon. Near the trade deadline, Snow traded Comrie and Chris Campoli to the Ottawa Senators in exchange for forward Dean McAmmond and the San Jose Sharks' first-round draft pick in the 2009 NHL entry draft and sent captain Bill Guerin to the Pittsburgh Penguins in exchange for a conditional draft pick.

In the 2008–09 season, the Islanders finished in last place in the league with a record of 26–47–9, which was the team's worst record since the 2000–01 season. After the conclusion of regular season, they won the draft lottery to retain the first overall pick in the 2009 NHL entry draft.

=== The Tavares era begins (2009–2015) ===
Beginning an effort to rebuild the team with new and young talent, the Islanders selected John Tavares with the first-overall pick of the 2009 NHL entry draft. Tavares went into the draft as the top prospect in the majority of scouting reports, and it was widely expected that the Islanders would select him after they secured the first overall pick by winning the draft lottery, although there was plenty of competition between Tavares, Victor Hedman, and Matt Duchene. NHL Central Scouting Bureau's Chris Edwards spoke highly of him, stating, "[Tavares] is phenomenal at getting the puck through traffic to his linemates, getting to opening. The way he reads the play and can get to where he figures the rebounds will be and bangs in the rebound. He's a real smart player." They traded up twice in the first round to also select defenseman Calvin de Haan with the 12th overall pick, as well as Casey Cizikas and Anders Lee in later rounds, all of whom would go on to play consistently on the main roster by the 2014–15 season.

The 2009–10 season started out slow, with the team winless its first six games. The team continued to play inconsistently due to injuries as many wrote them off as potential playoff contenders. The team hit a mid-season hot streak, however nine losses in 11 games before the Olympic break set them right back. They ultimately ended up at bottom of the standings again, finishing the season 26th in the league. The placement led to a fifth overall pick in 2010. Continuing with their rebuilding process, they used the first round to draft young forwards Nino Niederreiter and Brock Nelson with picks five and 30, respectively. As the 2010–11 season got underway, the team quickly fell into a ten-game losing streak, leading to the firing of head coach Scott Gordon. He was replaced on an interim basis by Jack Capuano, who had been coaching the Bridgeport Sound Tigers. Early in the season, they also acquired Michael Grabner from waivers, who went on to score 34 goals and was selected as a finalist for the Calder Memorial Trophy; he would go on to sign a five-year contract with the team at the end of the season. This year also featured the Penguins–Islanders brawl, which resulted in a combined 346 penalty minutes and a $100,000 fine to the Islanders for "failure to control their players".

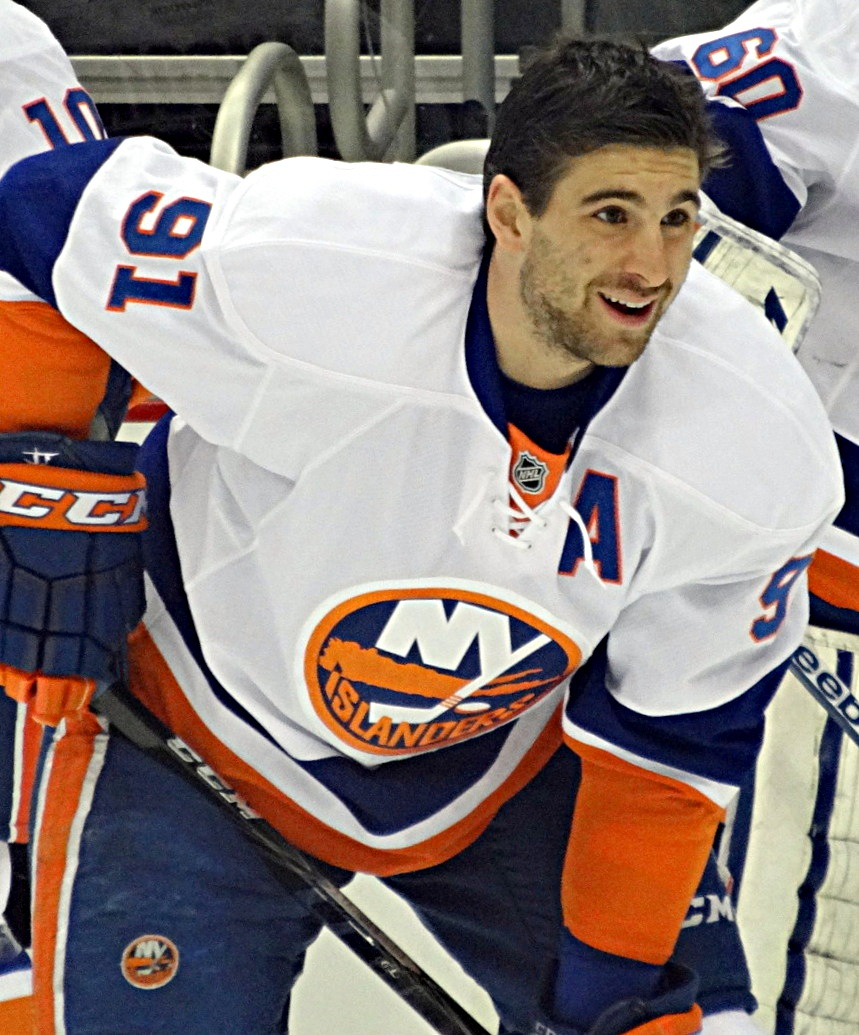
John Tavares, was named an alternate captain for the 2011–12 season. He was later named the team captain in 2013.

The following season was a breakout year for Tavares. The newly named assistant captain gained 31 goals and 50 assists, in addition to being selected to play in the 59th NHL All-Star Game at the age of 21; his 81 points were seventh-best in the league. Tavares' left-winger Matt Moulson also had a strong season, finishing with career highs of 36 goals, 33 assists and 69 points. Despite strong seasons from their top players, the team finished 27th in the league with a record of 34–37–11, continuing their pattern of racking up top prospects with early picks at the drafts. They used the first round of the 2012 draft to select defenseman Griffin Reinhart with the fourth overall pick.

On August 1, 2011, voters in Nassau County rejected a proposal for a new arena to replace Nassau Coliseum. This followed the failed decade-long attempt by owner Charles Wang to build a mixed-use development called The Lighthouse Project, which would have renovated the arena. In the wake of the vote, speculation began that the team would eventually move to Barclays Center in Brooklyn, new arenas in Queens or Suffolk County, the Sprint Center in Kansas City, or the Videotron Centre in Quebec City, the last of which was coincidentally set to open at the same time as the expiration of the Islanders' lease on the Nassau Coliseum in 2015.

On October 24, 2012, the Islanders made the announcement that the franchise would indeed be moving to the Barclays Center in Brooklyn for the 2015–16 NHL season, after signing a lease that would keep the team in the arena until 2040. The team retained its name, logo and colors as part of the move. As part of the deal, the management of Barclays Center took over the team's business operations once the Islanders moved to Barclays Center. The decision to move to Brooklyn didn't require the Rangers' approval. Under a longstanding provision of the agreement that allowed the Islanders to share the New York area with the Rangers, the Islanders are allowed to play their games anywhere on Long Island, including the two city boroughs on the island, Brooklyn and Queens.

Beginning on April 1, 2013, of the 2012–13 season, the team went on a near month-long unbeaten streak in regulation time, posting a 12-game streak of earning points until falling to the Philadelphia Flyers later that month. During that streak, on April 23, 2013, they clinched their first playoff berth since 2007 with a 4–3 shootout loss to the Carolina Hurricanes, ending a six-year playoff drought. Behind goaltender Evgeni Nabokov, the team was ultimately eliminated in six games by the Pittsburgh Penguins in the first round of the playoffs, continuing their winless streak in playoff series.

On September 10, 2013, Tavares was introduced as the 14th captain in New York Islanders history, replacing former Islander Mark Streit of the Philadelphia Flyers, who served as team captain since 2011. After posting a 4–4–3 record in their first 11 games, the Islanders made a trade, sending fan favorite and three-time 30-goal scorer Matt Moulson, their 2014 first-round draft pick and their 2015 second-round draft pick to the Buffalo Sabres in exchange for Thomas Vanek, a highly regarded and dynamic goal scorer. Despite chemistry with linemates Tavares and Kyle Okposo, however, his desire to test free agency and the team's impending move to Barclays Center led to Vanek being dealt to the Montreal Canadiens at the trade deadline for Sebastian Collberg and a 2014 second-round pick. After a season of player swapping and goaltending issues, they failed to qualify for the playoffs, finishing with a record of 34–37–11.

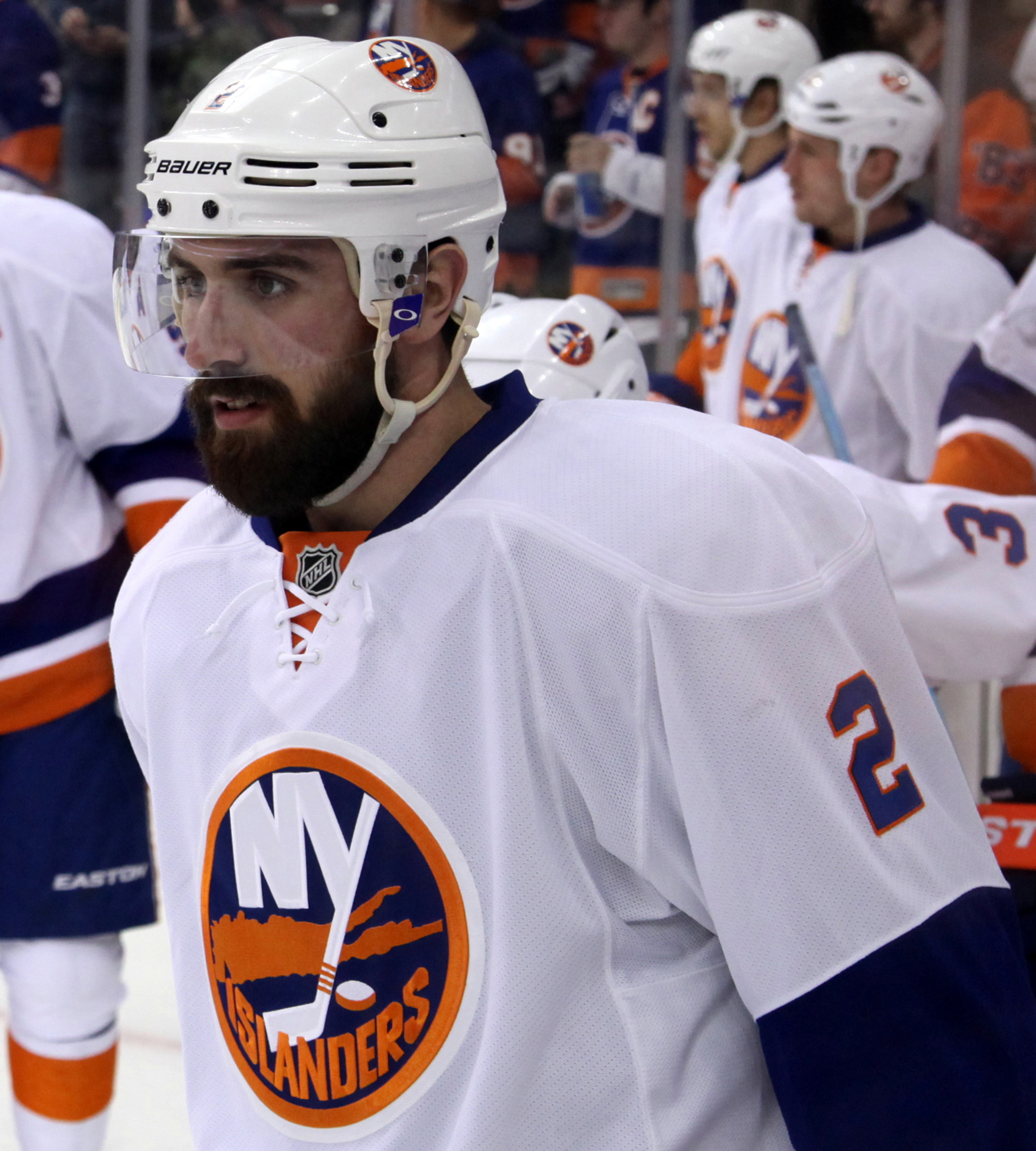
The Islanders acquired Nick Leddy through a trade with the Chicago Blackhawks during the 2014 off-season.

In the 2014 off-season, the Islanders made several moves to improve the team before their final season at Nassau Coliseum. In May, the Islanders acquired the rights to Jaroslav Halák from the Washington Capitals in exchange for a 2014 fourth-round pick. Halak was then signed to a four-year contract. The Islanders also signed Mikhail Grabovski, Nikolai Kulemin and goaltender Chad Johnson as free agents. Additionally, on October 4, the Islanders acquired Johnny Boychuk from the Boston Bruins for two-second round picks in 2014 and 2015 and a conditional 2015 third-round pick, as well as Nick Leddy from the Chicago Blackhawks in exchange for prospect Ville Pokka, T. J. Brennan and the rights to Anders Nilsson.

The NHL Board of Governors approved the Islanders' sale to businessmen Jon Ledecky and Scott D. Malkin in October 2014. Ledecky and Malkin served as minority partners during a two-year transition period. At the end of the 2015–16 season, they formally took majority control from Wang, who retained a share of the franchise.

The Islanders finished the 2014–15 regular season with a record of 47–28–7 for 101 points, and met the Washington Capitals in the first round of the 2015 playoffs. The Capitals held home-ice advantage in the series after the Islanders lost their final regular season game to the Columbus Blue Jackets, 5–4, in a shootout, as the Islanders lost the season series to the Capitals after posting a 2–1–1 record in the season series (Washington went 2–0–2, winning the season series with six points to the Islanders' five). On April 19, 2015, in the third game of their first-round series against Washington, John Tavares scored 15 seconds into overtime to win the game for the Islanders, 2–1. It was the second-shortest overtime playoff game in Islanders history, and was the first overtime, game-winning goal for the Islanders in the playoffs since 1993. The Islanders lost the fourth and fifth games of their series before rebounding in the sixth game to force a seventh game in the series. However, they were denied entry into the second round by a single goal and would ultimately fall to the Capitals in seven games. As a result, game 6 was the Islanders' last game at Nassau Veterans Memorial Coliseum; the Isles' Cal Clutterbuck scored the final NHL goal in the building's first run prior to the Islanders' return in 2018.

=== Move to Barclays Center and playoff series win (2015–2017) ===
In June 2015, the Islanders entered the 2015 draft without a first-round pick, but emerged with two first-rounders in Mathew Barzal and Anthony Beauvillier after a series of draft day trades. The Islanders also selected forward Andong Song in the sixth round of the 2015 draft, making him the first Chinese player to be drafted by an NHL team.

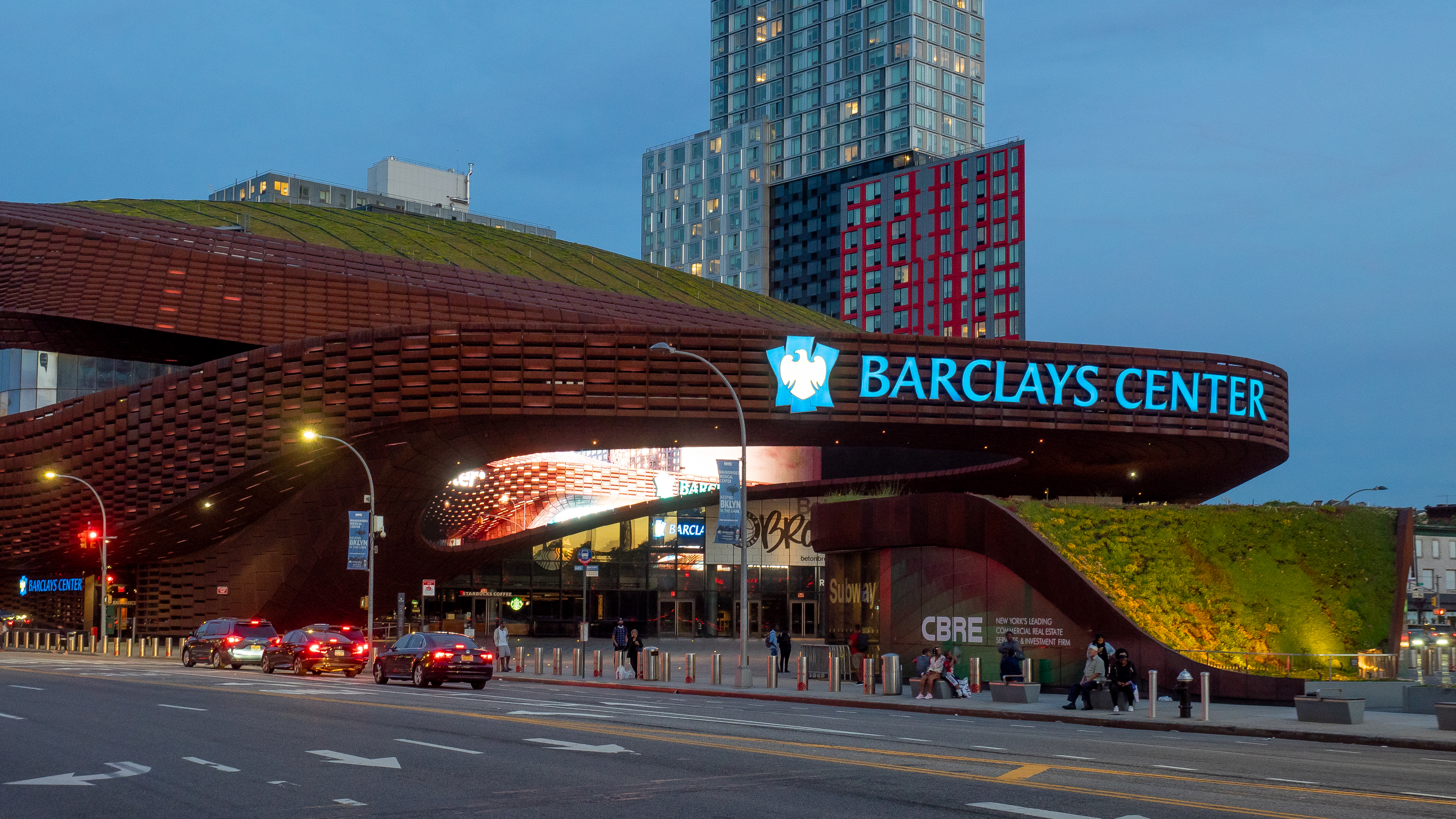
Barclays Center in Brooklyn. The Islanders played their home games there from 2015 to 2020.

The Islanders played their first regular season game at Barclays Center on October 9, 2015, losing 3–2 in overtime to the Chicago Blackhawks. Artem Anisimov scored the first regular season goal, while Tavares scored the first regular season Islanders goal. The Islanders posted the fourth-best penalty kill rate and allowed the fewest power-play goals during the season. However, in the last quarter of the regular season, some players, including Halak and defenseman Travis Hamonic, suffered key injuries. The team finished the regular season fourth in the Metropolitan Division with 100 points, enough to clinch the first wild card spot in the Eastern Conference. In the first round of the playoffs, they faced off against the Florida Panthers; goaltender Thomas Greiss only played in 40 minutes of playoff hockey with the San Jose Sharks prior to this series. Both teams split the first four games of the series. The fifth game of the series proved to be a major turning point, as late season call-up Alan Quine scored the game-winning goal on the power play with four minutes left in double overtime to end the second-longest game in franchise history; that goal gave them a 3–2 series lead and a chance to clinch the series on home ice. In the sixth game, the Islanders trailed 1–0 for much of the game, but Tavares tied it late in the third period. Tavares would score again with the series-clinching goal in double overtime to give the Islanders their first playoff series win since 1993. In the second round of the playoffs, they faced the Tampa Bay Lightning for the first time since 2004. Despite winning the first game of the series, the Islanders lost their series to the Lightning in five games.

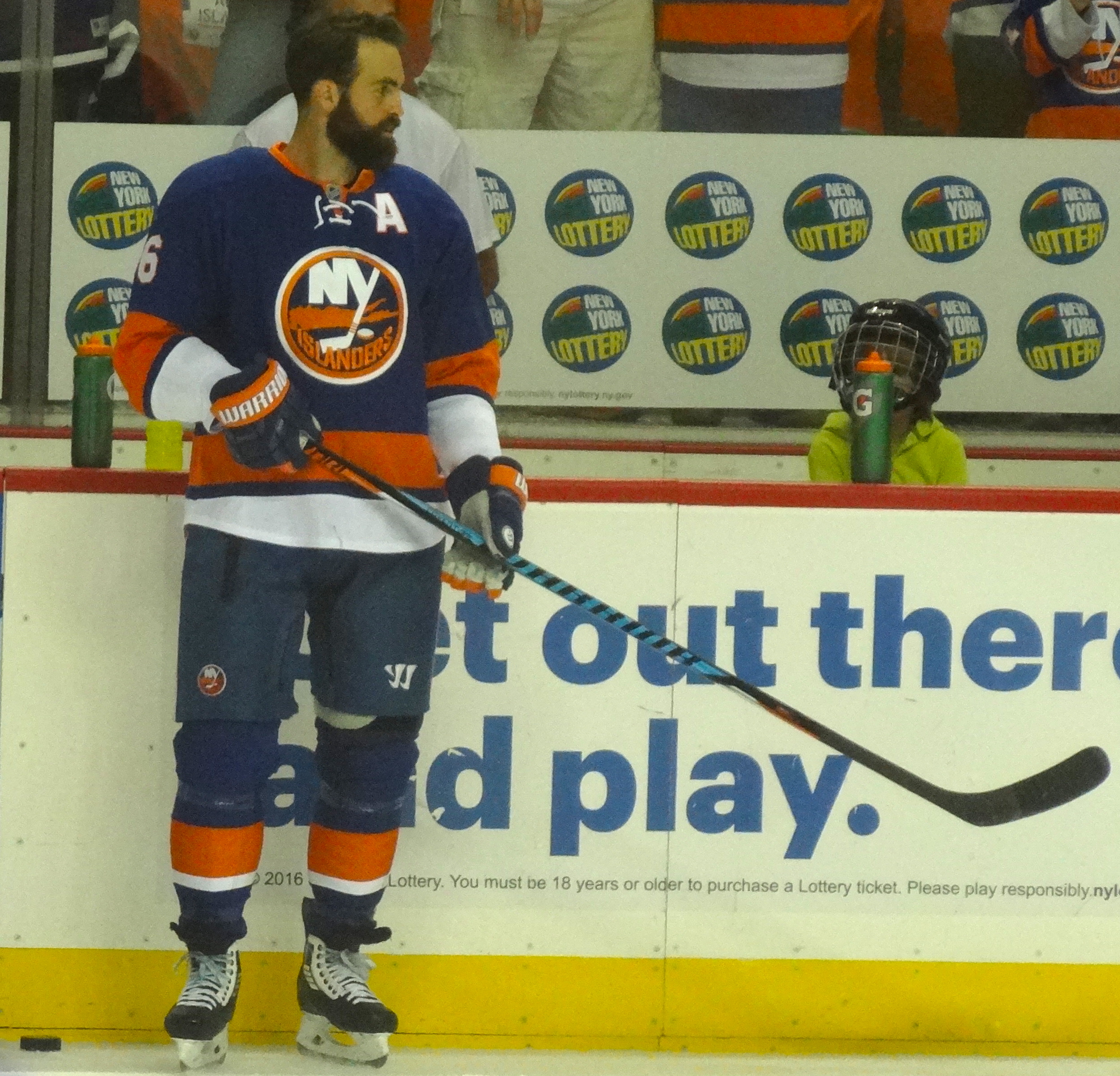
Andrew Ladd prior to a game during the 2016–17 season. Ladd signed with the Islanders as a free agent during the 2016 off-season.

Summer of 2016 saw free agents and longtime Islanders Kyle Okposo, Frans Nielsen, and Matt Martin all depart the team, joining the Buffalo Sabres, Detroit Red Wings, and Toronto Maple Leafs, respectively. Snow signed free agents Andrew Ladd from the Chicago Blackhawks and Jason Chimera from the Washington Capitals to help fill the gaps left behind. After an underwhelming first half of the 2016–17 season, posting a 17–17–8 record through 42 games, head coach Jack Capuano was relieved of duties, with assistant general manager Doug Weight being named interim head coach. Having coached the team since 2010, Capuano was the second-winningest coach in the team's history with 227 wins, also leading the team to their first playoff series win since 1993. Prior to Capuano's release, goaltender Jaroslav Halák was placed on waivers, and eventually sent down to the Bridgeport Sound Tigers. Having carried three goaltenders for the second consecutive season, the decision was made to stick with the tandem of Greiss and back-up Jean-François Bérubé after Halak posted a 6–8–5 record with a .904 save percentage through the beginning of the 2016–17 season.

In late January 2017, following a report by Bloomberg News which speculated that Barclays Center was considering removing the Islanders due to poor attendance and effects on the venue's profit margins (reception to Barclays Center as a hockey venue was mixed partly due to obstructed view seats, as well as features like an off-center scoreboard, and the Islanders had the third-worst average attendance in the entire league while playing at the venue), Newsday reported that Nassau County executive Edward Mangano had met with one of the team's co-owners, and told the paper that it was possible that the Islanders could return to the renovated Nassau Coliseum. However, commissioner Gary Bettman considered the concept to be "unviable" (the renovation reduced the capacity of the arena to just under 14,000, which is smaller than any NHL arena), and noted that Ledecky and Malkin were pursuing a possible arena project at Belmont Park.

Despite winning their last six games of the 2016–17 season, the Islanders finished in ninth place in the Eastern Conference; they missed the playoffs by only one point when the Toronto Maple Leafs clinched the final playoff spot on the penultimate day of the season.

=== Lamoriello era and Conference Final appearances (2017–2025) ===
On February 9, 2018, rookie Mathew Barzal recorded his third five-point game, becoming only the second rookie to do so since Joe Malone in 1917–18 and tying a 100-year-old record in the process. At the end of the 2017–18 regular season, Barzal had 85 points (22 goals, 63 assists). He led his team and all NHL rookies in points, and was tied for 13th overall in scoring in the NHL. Barzal was the seventh rookie in NHL history, and first since Sidney Crosby in 2005–06, to have scored at least 20 goals and 60 assists in a single season. Barzal also tied Islanders legend, Bryan Trottier's franchise record for rookie assists. Barzal won the Calder Trophy as NHL Rookie of the Year for his 85-point season, leading the closest candidate by 20 points and receiving 160 out of 164 first-place votes. Barzal was the first Islanders' player to win the award since Bryan Berard in 1997, and he was the fifth Islanders' player overall to win the trophy, joining Islanders legends Mike Bossy (1978), Trottier (1976), and Denis Potvin (1974).

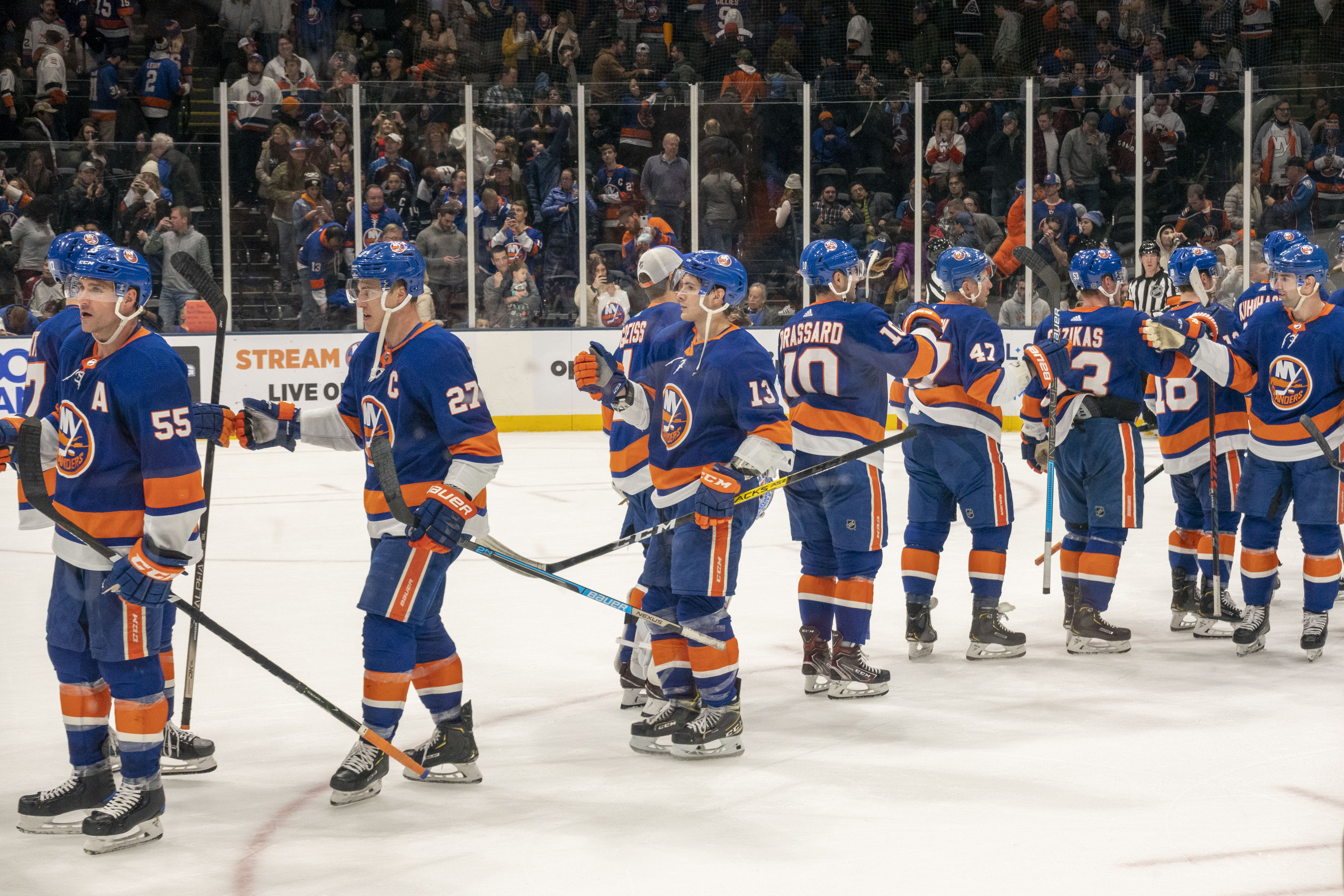
Islanders players after a win against the Colorado Avalanche on January 6, 2020

During the 2018 off-season, the Islanders announced that former New Jersey Devils and Toronto Maple Leafs general manager Lou Lamoriello was named their president of hockey operations, with "full authority over all hockey matters with the organization", and would become general manager on June 5, 2018, replacing Garth Snow. Additionally, Barry Trotz was hired as head coach of the Islanders. Trotz resigned from the Washington Capitals one month prior after coaching them to their first Stanley Cup championship since they entered the NHL in 1974. Captain John Tavares' contract with the team expired following the 2017–18 season, and despite attempts to re-sign him, he joined the Toronto Maple Leafs as a free agent.

In the 2018–19 season, the Islanders split their home games between Barclays Center and their former home, Nassau Coliseum. The use of both arenas would continue over the course of the following two seasons until the completion of a new 18,000-seat arena at Belmont Park in Elmont. The Islanders enjoyed success throughout the 2018–19 season, clinching a playoff berth at home for the first time in 17 years, and the first time in March since 1990. Nassau Coliseum hosted their home playoff games during the first round while the Barclays Center hosted their home games for the rest of the playoffs. In the first round of the 2019 playoffs, the Islanders swept the Pittsburgh Penguins, and in the second round the team was swept by the Carolina Hurricanes.

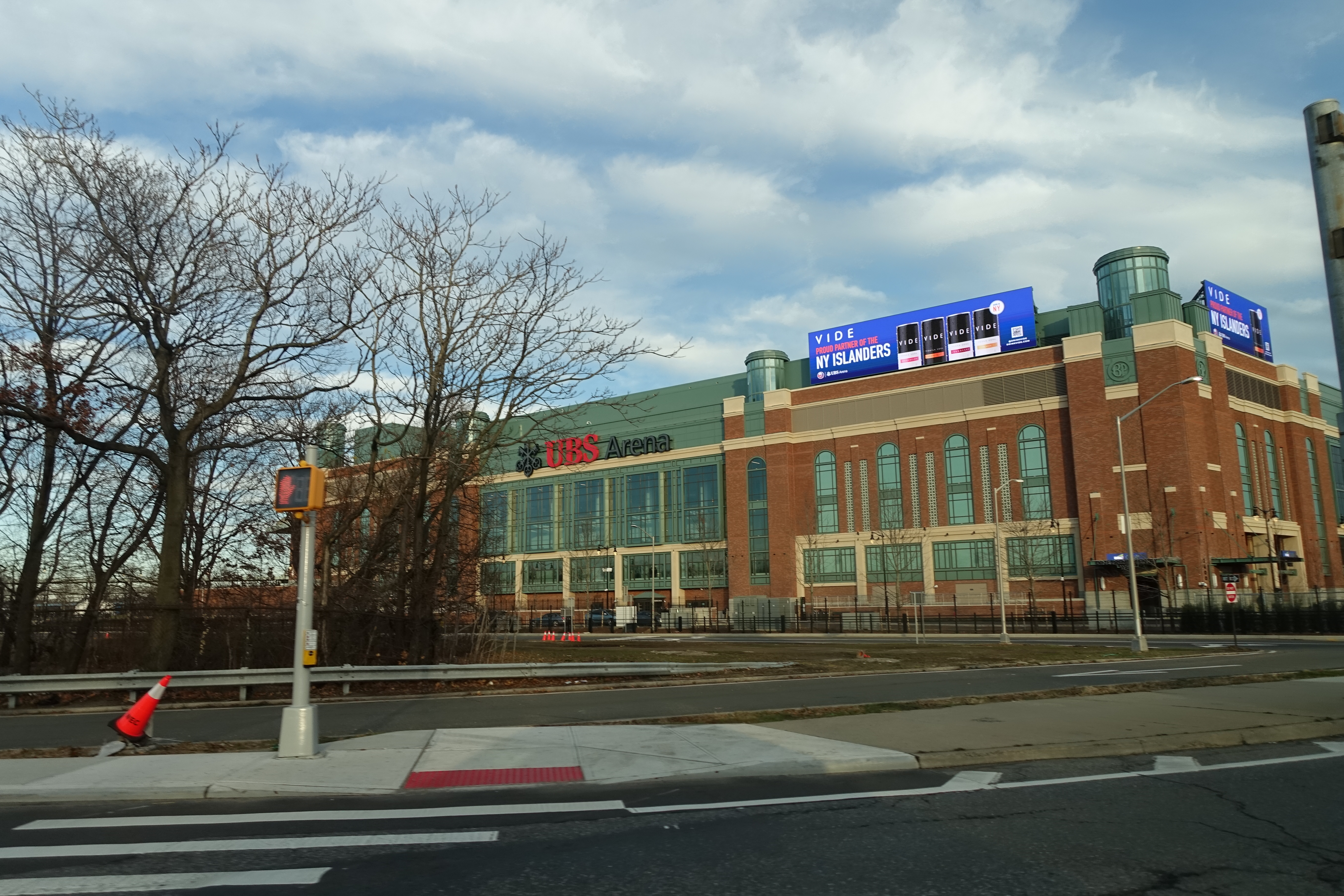
Since November 2021, the Islanders have played their home games at UBS Arena in Elmont, New York.

On August 8, 2019, the Empire State Development Corporation board (ESD) voted unanimously in favor of the Belmont Park Arena project.

In February 2020, it was announced that the Islanders would return to Nassau Coliseum for the 2020 Stanley Cup playoffs and the 2020–21 season until UBS Arena was opened. Both the 2019–20 season and the construction of the new arena were interrupted by the COVID-19 pandemic. When the NHL season was suspended on March 12, 2020, the Islanders had twelve regular season games remaining and were one point shy of the eighth and final playoff spot in the Eastern Conference. The Islanders qualified for the NHL Return-to-Play initiative as the seventh seed, beating the Florida Panthers in four games in a best-of-5 qualifying round to make the 2020 Stanley Cup playoffs. They would then go on to defeat the Washington Capitals in the first round in five games. Then, after blowing a 3–1 series lead to the Philadelphia Flyers that extended the series to seven games, the Islanders would go on to win game 7 against the Flyers and advance to the conference finals for the first time since the 1993 playoffs. However, their run would come to an end at the hands of the Tampa Bay Lightning in six games. In December 2020, New York Islanders Hockey Club, L.P. bought the remaining 15 percent stake of the team from the estate of Charles Wang and took full ownership of the team.

The Islanders again made the playoffs in the shortened 2020–21 season, defeating the Penguins and Bruins each in six games. They again lost to the Tampa Bay Lightning, this time in seven.

The Islanders started the 2021–22 season on a 13-game road trip while UBS Arena was finalizing construction, finishing their road trip with a 5–6–2 record. However, minutes before the first home game of the season on November 20, 2021, many Islander players contracted COVID-19 and missed the home opener and several others. Longest tenured Islander Josh Bailey and team captain Anders Lee missed the game, while Adam Pelech, Anthony Beauvillier, and Andy Greene were ruled out minutes before puck drop. They lost the home opener to the Calgary Flames by a score of 5–2. Brad Richardson scored the first goal in UBS Arena history, while Brock Nelson scored the first Islander goal. The Islanders won their first game at UBS Arena against the Devils, on December 11, by a score of 4–2. Former Devils captain Zach Parise scored the game-winning goal for the Islanders. The Islanders missed the playoffs after three consecutive trips, finishing the season with a 37–35–10 record. On May 9, 2022, head coach Barry Trotz was relieved from his duties, and replaced with Lane Lambert. In the next season, the Islanders finished as the first wild card, but were defeated by the Carolina Hurricanes in the first round of the 2023 playoffs.

After an inconsistent start to the 2023–24 season, head coach Lane Lambert was fired on January 20, 2024, and Patrick Roy was hired as his replacement. The Islanders finished in third place in the Metropolitan Division and lost to the Carolina Hurricanes in the first round of the 2024 playoffs.

After a disappointing 2024–25 season where the team finished 35–35–12 and missing the playoffs by nine points, the Islanders announced on April 22, 2025, that they would not be renewing Lamoriello's contract, bringing his time as general manager and president of hockey operations to an end.

=== Schaefer and new management (2025–present) ===
Despite having only the 10th-best odds, the Islanders won the 2025 NHL draft lottery, acquiring the right to select first overall for the first time since 2009. In the off-season, Mathieu Darche replaced Lamoriello as general manager. At the draft, the Islanders took Canadian defenseman Matthew Schaefer first overall. Due to Darche's decision to trade defenseman Noah Dobson to the Montreal Canadiens, the club made two additional first-round selections that year.

On April 5, 2026, the Islanders fired head coach Patrick Roy with four games remaining in the 2025–26 regular season, and named Peter DeBoer as new head coach. Despite the late coaching change, the Islanders missed the playoffs again.

== Team identity ==
=== Logo ===
The Islanders' first logo, used from 1972 to 1995; a similar logo with a slight difference in colors was used from 1997 to 2010.

The club's current wordmark logo.

Advertising executive John Alogna created the original Islanders logo, a circle with the letters "NY" over a map of the Nassau and Suffolk counties. The lower part of the Y is made to resemble a hockey stick, with three orange stripes near the bottom of the shaft and a puck to the right of the stick blade. At the bottom of the logo, the name of the team is written so that the tip of the "I" ends in a point aimed at Uniondale, the location of Nassau Coliseum.

Before the 1995–96 season, the Islanders attempted to update their look by introducing a new logo depicting a fisherman holding a hockey stick. The new logo was a marketing disaster; the reaction among the fanbase was so negative that management announced it would revert to the original logo as soon as league rules allowed them to do so. Many found that the logo bore a strong resemblance to the Gorton's fisherman; indeed, New York Rangers fans taunted the Islanders with chants of "We want fishsticks!" long after the logo was discarded. The traditional logo was phased back in over the next two seasons, starting as an alternate jersey logo in 1996–97 before fully replacing the fisherman in 1997–98. The only change to the classic logo at this time was its colors; as the team had replaced its original royal blue with navy, the logo was recolored to match.

The short-lived "Fisherman" logo, used from 1995 to 1997

Beginning in 2008–09, the Islanders introduced another modification to their original logo for their new third jersey. The "new" logo, once again in royal blue, now features four orange stripes on the hockey stick instead of three, representing the four consecutive Stanley Cup titles won by the team in the 1980s. This became the team's full-time logo in 2010.

For their 2014 Stadium Series special jerseys, the Islanders used a simplified jersey logo with just the "NY" from their regular logo. Versions of that have since appeared on third jersey designs.

=== Jerseys ===
The Islanders debuted in 1972 with traditional-style jerseys: one was white with orange and royal blue stripes near the waistline and on the sleeves, the other was royal blue with white and orange stripes. The design remained largely the same, with only minor tweaks through the 1994–95 season.

Prior to the 1995–96 season, team executives decided to change the jersey. The fisherman logo replaced the "NY" circular design, incorporating navy blue and a brighter orange, and introducing teal and gray shades. The team was seeking increased merchandise revenues, with the outward justification of connecting the team more overtly to Long Island. The jersey included a lighthouse shoulder patch, a reference to the Montauk Lighthouse, and featured uneven stripes resembling an ocean wave near the waistline, on the sleeves, and across the shoulders. All of the numbering and lettering on the jerseys also followed the wave pattern. Late in the season, the team eliminated the fisherman logo, but league rules forbade them from switching jersey designs for the 1996–97 season on only a few months' notice. Instead, they debuted their first third (and fourth) jerseys, which were identical to the home and road jerseys worn by the team, except the circular "NY" crest, now colored in the navy blue and bright orange shades to match, replaced the fisherman logo. The team wore these jerseys in approximately 15 games during that season and adopted them permanently in the 1997–98 season.

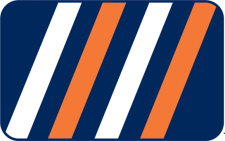
The shoulder logo used on Islanders jerseys from 1998 through 2010

Prior to the 1998–99 season, the team's jerseys reverted to a traditional design but kept the navy blue and bright orange shades from the jerseys used the previous three seasons. They added a shoulder patch of four bars, alternating in color, to represent the Islanders' four Stanley Cup championships. A predominantly orange third jersey was introduced in 2002–03, featuring navy blue yokes and sides that formed sharp points on the sleeves and body. The team wore this jersey through the 2006–07 season.

For the 2007–08 season, the Islanders redesigned their uniforms as all NHL teams changed over to the Reebok Edge system. These jerseys resembled the prior design but included uniform numbers on the right chest above the logo. The name plates were also in two colored format: white on orange on the navy blue home jersey and navy blue on orange on the white road jersey. The sleeves on both jerseys were orange, with a wide navy stripe above a thin white stripe at the elbow. The jerseys had a thin stripe tracing around the shoulders, and featured "retro" laces at the neck.

A royal blue throwback design was introduced the following season as a third jersey. Before the 2010–11 season, the Islanders made this throwback design their new home jersey. A corresponding new white road jersey was unveiled during the Islanders' draft party at Nassau Coliseum.

For the following season, they unveiled an alternate jersey in black with grey on the shoulder yoke. The front of the jersey bore the team name above the player's number in orange with blue and white trim. The Islanders crest was placed on the shoulder yoke. Diagonal side panels, blue trimmed in orange and gray, combined with similar panels on the black pants to form a diamond shape on the sides of each player. These were only used sparing for two seasons, as they proved unpopular.

During the 2014 Stadium Series, the Islanders wore a special edition jersey. The front side featured the "NY" from the primary logo in a special chrome treatment, while the back side featured a white nameplate with blue letters for player names, and bigger numbers in white trimmed in orange for visibility purposes. The sleeve numbers were also angled diagonally. The primary Islanders logo would be placed on the left shoulder within the white yoke. This jersey was promoted to an alternate third jersey in the 2014–15 season, replacing the black third jersey. During that season, on February 3, 2015, the team wore an updated version of the fisherman jersey for warmups before their game against the Florida Panthers.

The Islanders retired the Stadium Series third jersey after only one season, replacing it with a new black alternate that was unveiled to coincide with the team's move to Brooklyn. Unlike the previous black alternate, this version featured little blue and orange at all (these colors appear only on the rear collar), while the "NY" insignia that was carried over from the Stadium Series jersey was stripped of its chrome accents. The four narrow white stripes on the sleeves symbolize the franchise's four Stanley Cup wins.

When the NHL switched to Adidas as its uniform provider in 2017, the Islanders kept their primary jerseys mostly intact except for the restoration of the blue trim in the primary logo on the road jersey. As with all NHL teams, the Islanders only wore two jerseys for the 2017–18 season, thus retiring the all-black third jerseys.

The Islanders released a new blue third jersey for the 2018–19 season, featuring an updated "NY" insignia (shorter "Y-stick" with four orange stripes on the blade), white shoulder yoke (reminiscent of the 2014 Stadium Series alternates), the map of Long Island on the collar, and orange numbers that call back to the jerseys used during the team's inaugural season.

In the 2020–21 season, the Islanders released a special "Reverse Retro" alternate uniform. The uniform resembled their current home jerseys, but used the navy blue and bright orange scheme worn from 1995 to 2010. A second "Reverse Retro" uniform was released in the 2022–23 season, using the "Fisherman" uniform from 1995 to 1997 but with less teal elements and diagonal orange striping.

During the 2024 Stadium Series, the Islanders wore navy blue jerseys with a thick orange middle stripe. "ISLES" in navy blue letters was added within the orange stripe, as are the navy blue numbers.

The Islanders reverted to wearing only their primary jerseys after Fanatics took over as the NHL uniform provider in 2024, even though it kept most aspects of Adidas' template and retained the use of third jerseys.

In the 2026–27 season, the Islanders revisited the Fisherman look for their "Hometown Remix" uniform, with modified typography and logos.

=== Mascot and Ice Girls ===
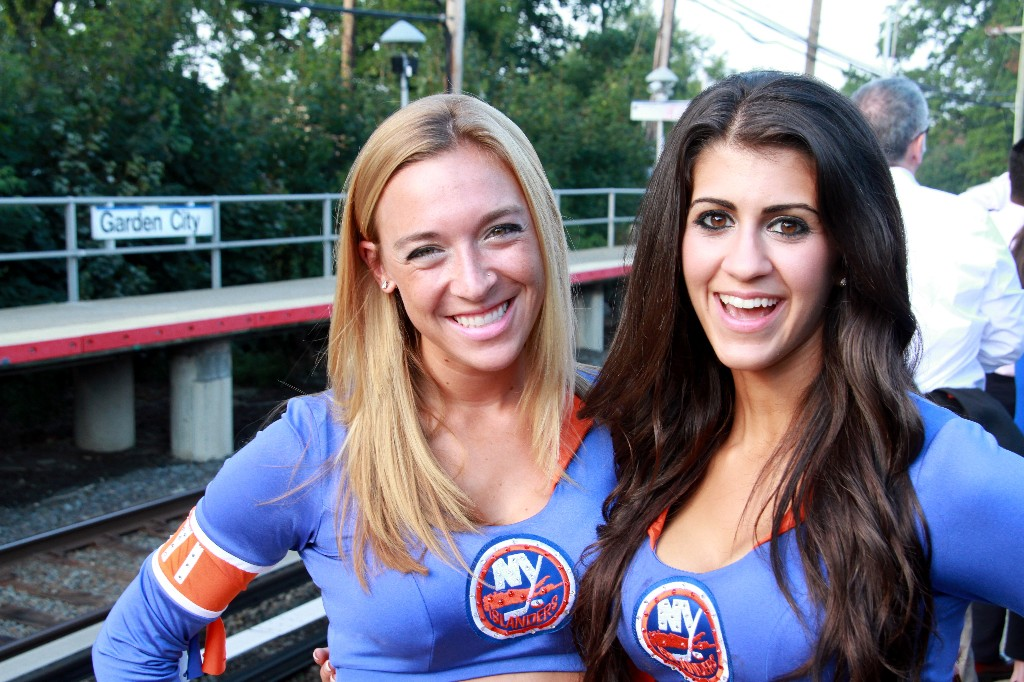
Ice Girls at a community event in 2013

The Islanders' team mascot is named "Sparky the Dragon", who served at one point as cross-promotion with the Arena Football League's New York Dragons team, who also played their home games at Nassau Coliseum. In the mid-1990s, the Islanders had a mascot named "Nyisles" whose body style went from round to human-shaped, and facial features vaguely resembled the logo fisherman, excluding its red hair and beard. Nyisles was discontinued toward the end of the 1997–98 season when the team distributed "Who kidnapped Nyisles?" flyers implying the reason for his disappearance was because of another NHL mascot, ultimately revealed to be Toronto Maple Leafs mascot Carlton the Bear. Nyisles returned as the secondary mascot of the club with a brand new look in December 2022 to coincide with the return of the Fisherman logo on the team's reverse retro uniforms.

From the 2001–02 season to the 2014–15 season, the Islanders also had an ice crew named the "Ice Girls", made up of only women who skated onto the ice during television breaks to clean up the snow that piled up during the game. The Ice Girls were also used for promotional purposes during games and at community events. Starting in the 2015–16 season, a co-ed ice crew would replace the Ice Girls.

=== Rivalries ===
The Islanders have rivalries with the New York Rangers, Philadelphia Flyers, and Washington Capitals.

==== New York Rangers ====
Often referred to as the Battle of New York, the rivalry between the Islanders and the New York Rangers dates back to the 1970s. The rivalry was at its height from the mid-1970s to the mid-1980s, with the Islanders completing their dynasty in the early 1980s. The rivalry also saw a resurgence in the early to mid-1990s with the Rangers knocking the Islanders out of the 1994 playoffs and eventually defeating the Vancouver Canucks in the 1994 Stanley Cup Final. The Rangers hold the distinction as being the Islanders' most-hated rival.

==== Philadelphia Flyers ====
Originating in 1975, the rivalry between the Islanders and the Philadelphia Flyers stems from the two teams meeting each other in the playoffs several times from the mid-1970s to the 1980s.

==== Washington Capitals ====
The rivalry between the Islanders and the Washington Capitals stems from several playoff meetings from the early 1980s to the early 1990s, with the rivalry cooling off in the 2000s before resurging in the mid-2010s and early 2020s.

== Season-by-season record ==
This is only a partial list of the last five seasons. For the full season-by-season history, see List of New York Islanders seasons

Note: GP = Games played, W = Wins, L = Losses, T = Ties, OTL = Overtime losses, Pts = Points, GF = Goals for, GA = Goals against

Season	GP	W	L	OTL	Pts	GF	GA	Finish	Playoffs
2021–22	82	37	35	10	84	231	237	5th, Metropolitan	Did not qualify
2022–23	82	42	31	9	93	243	222	4th, Metropolitan	Lost in first round, 2–4 (Hurricanes)
2023–24	82	39	27	16	94	246	263	3rd, Metropolitan	Lost in first round, 1–4 (Hurricanes)
2024–25	82	35	35	12	82	224	260	6th, Metropolitan	Did not qualify
2025–26	82	43	34	5	91	233	241	6th, Metropolitan	Did not qualify

== Players and personnel ==
=== Current roster ===
Updated November 18, 2026

No.	Nat	Player	Pos	S/G	Age	Acquired	Birthplace
13	(Canada)	Mathew Barzal	C	R	29	2015	Coquitlam, British Columbia
26	(United States)	Mitchell Chaffee	RW	R	28	2026	Grand Rapids, Michigan
53	(Canada)	Casey Cizikas	C	L	35	2009	Toronto, Ontario
77	(United States)	Tony DeAngelo	D	R	31	2025	Sewell, New Jersey
11	(Canada)	Anthony Duclair	LW	L	31	2024	Pointe-Claire, Quebec
38	(Sweden)	Victor Eklund	RW	R	20	2025	Stockholm, Sweden
51	(Sweden)	Emil Heineman	LW	L	25	2025	Leksand, Sweden
92	(Sweden)	Simon Holmström	RW	L	25	2019	Tranås, Sweden
14	(Canada)	Bo Horvat (C)	C	L	31	2023	Rodney, Ontario
71	(Canada)	Ben Hutton	D	L	33	2026	Brockville, Ontario
4	(United States)	Matthew Kessel	D	R	26	2026	Bloomfield Hills, Michigan
63	(Finland)	Matias Maccelli	LW	L	26	2026	Turku, Finland
24	(United States)	Scott Mayfield	D	R	34	2011	St. Louis, Missouri
44	(Canada)	Jean-Gabriel Pageau	C	R	34	2020	Ottawa, Ontario
81	(Czech Republic)	Ondřej Palát	LW	L	35	2026	Frýdek-Místek, Czechoslovakia
21	(United States)	Kyle Palmieri (A)	RW	R	35	2021	Smithtown, New York
3	(Canada)	Adam Pelech	D	L	32	2012	Toronto, Ontario
6	(Canada)	Ryan Pulock (A)	D	R	32	2013	Grandview, Manitoba
28	(Russia)	Alexander Romanov	D	L	26	2022	Moscow, Russia
48	(Canada)	Matthew Schaefer (A)	D	L	19	2025	Hamilton, Ontario
10	(Canada)	Brayden Schenn (A)	C	L	35	2026	Saskatoon, Saskatchewan
30	(Russia)	Ilya Sorokin	G	L	31	2014	Mezhdurechensk, Russia
8	(Canada)	Logan Stanley	D	L	28	2026	Kitchener, Ontario
40	(Russia)	Semyon Varlamov	G	L	38	2019	Kuybyshev, Soviet Union

=== Honored members ===
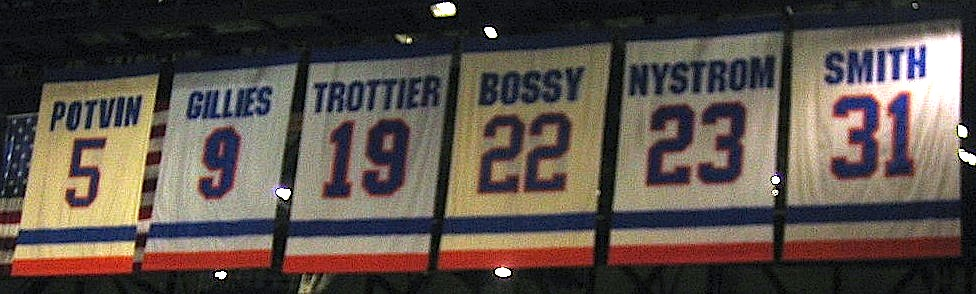
Banners at Nassau Coliseum depicting retired numbers in 2007; since then, banners for Butch Goring and John Tonelli have been added.

New York Islanders retired numbers
No.	Player	Position	Career	Date of retirement
5	Denis Potvin	D	1973–1988	February 1, 1992
9	Clark Gillies	LW	1974–1986	December 7, 1996
19	Bryan Trottier	C	1975–1990	October 20, 2001
22	Mike Bossy	RW	1977–1987	March 3, 1992
23	Bob Nystrom	RW	1972–1986	April 1, 1995
27	John Tonelli	LW	1978–1986	February 21, 2020
31	Billy Smith	G	1972–1989	February 20, 1993
91	Butch Goring	C	1980–1985	February 29, 2020

Nine former Islanders players have been inducted into the Hockey Hall of Fame – Mike Bossy, Zdeno Chára, Clark Gillies, Pat LaFontaine, Roberto Luongo, Denis Potvin, Billy Smith, Bryan Trottier and Pierre Turgeon. Bossy and Potvin were the first Islanders to be inducted, in 1991. Chara is the most recent Islander to be inducted, in 2025.

In addition to the eight players, two team builders have been inducted; Bill Torrey and Al Arbour were inducted in 1995 and 1996, respectively. Lou Lamoriello, hired to serve as Islanders general manager in 2018, was previously inducted into the Hall of Fame in 2009.

Six of the nine Hall of Fame players (Bossy, Gillies, Potvin, Smith, Trottier and LaFontaine), in addition to Bob Bourne, have since been inducted into the Islanders' Hall of Fame, established in 2007. In February 2008, the team unveiled the Hall of Fame plaques for each player, which are displayed at the team's practice facility. In November 2011, first Islanders captain Ed Westfall was added to their Hall of Fame, followed by the addition of defenseman Ken Morrow in December 2011, right-winger Patrick Flatley ("Chairman of the Boards") in January 2012 and Kenny Jönsson in February 2012. In February 2020, John Tonelli and Butch Goring were inducted into the Islanders Hall of Fame at the same time their numbers, 27 and 91 respectively, were retired by the team. Brent Sutter was inducted on January 18, 2025. On December 13, 2025, Pat LaFontaine became the most recent Islanders alumnus to be inducted into the team's Hall of Fame.

There are two other banners hanging with the retired numbers: one honors Al Arbour in recognition of his 1,500 games coached for the Islanders, and the other honors Bill Torrey, who held the titles of general manager, vice president, president, and chairman of the board for the Islanders organization from 1972 until 1993. In place of a number, Torrey's banner features the words "The Architect" and his trademark bowtie.

The NHL retired Wayne Gretzky's No. 99 for all its member teams at the 2000 NHL All-Star Game.

=== Team captains ===
The Islanders have had 16 team captains. The team's first, Ed Westfall, won the Bill Masterton Trophy during his captaincy; Michael Peca, who won the Frank J. Selke Trophy after the 2001–02 season, is the only other captain to have won an award during his term. The longest captaincy reign was Denis Potvin's from 1979 through 1987, during which he played 521 regular season games. Bryan McCabe served for the shortest length of time, a mere 56 regular season games before being traded to the Vancouver Canucks. Also traded mid-season was Bill Guerin, who went to the Pittsburgh Penguins during the 2008–09 season. The Islanders' 16th and most recent captain, Bo Horvat, was named to the position on September 14, 2026.

Two seasons have been played without a captain. Nobody was assigned to the position for the 1996–97 season after previous captain Patrick Flatley was released from his contract. The 2000–01 season also went by without a captain after Kenny Jönsson stepped down from the position on November 18, 2000.

- Ed Westfall, 1972–1977
- Clark Gillies, 1977–1979
- Denis Potvin, 1979–1987
- Brent Sutter, 1987–1991
- Patrick Flatley, 1991–1996
- Bryan McCabe, 1997–1998
- Trevor Linden, 1998–1999
- Kenny Jönsson, 1999–2000
- Michael Peca, 2001–2004
- Alexei Yashin, 2005–2007
- Bill Guerin, 2007–2009
- Doug Weight, 2009–2011
- Mark Streit, 2011–2013
- John Tavares, 2013–2018
- Anders Lee, 2018–2026
- Bo Horvat, 2026–present

=== General managers ===
The current general manager of the Islanders is Mathieu Darche, who was named to the role on May 23, 2025.

=== Head coaches ===
The current head coach of the Islanders is Peter DeBoer, who was named to the role on April 5, 2026.

== Franchise records ==
Bryan Trottier holds the franchise record for most points with the team (1,353), as well as most games played (1,123). Only Trottier and two others, Mike Bossy and Denis Potvin have scored over 1,000 points with the team, while six others have gained more than 500, with Derek King only one point shy. Potvin and Josh Bailey are the only other players besides Trottier to play in over 1,000 games with the team; Potvin is also the only defenseman in the top ten of the franchise scoring leaders, ranking third overall.

=== Scoring leaders ===
These are the top-ten point-scorers in franchise history. Figures are updated after each completed NHL regular season.

- * – current Islanders player

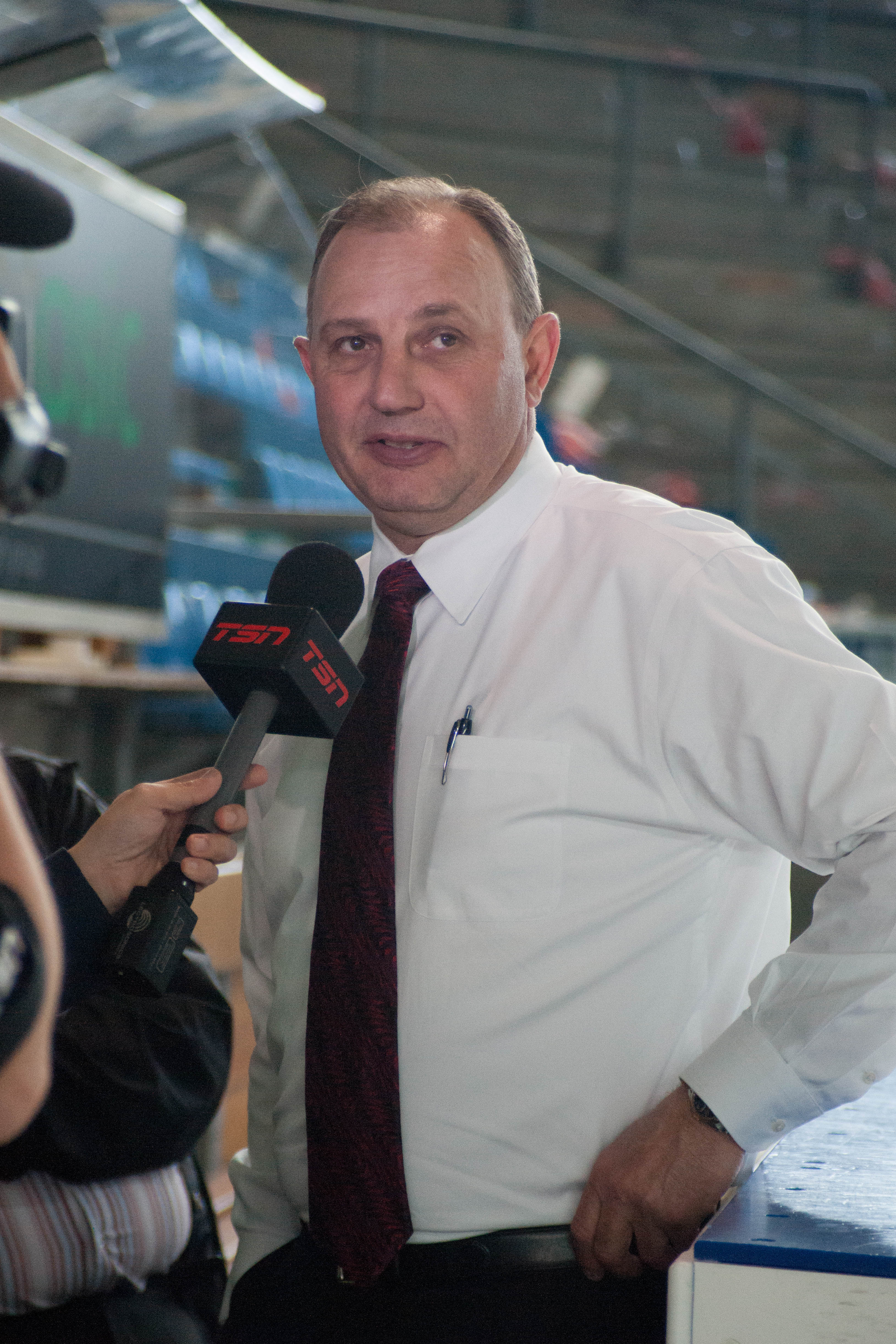
Playing with the Islanders from 1981 to 1991, Brent Sutter is sixth in all-time franchise scoring.

Note: Pos = Position; GP = Games played; G = Goals; A = Assists; Pts = Points; P/G = Points per game

Points
Player	Pos	GP	G	A	Pts	P/G
Bryan Trottier	C	1,123	500	853	1,353	1.20
Mike Bossy	RW	752	573	553	1,126	1.50
Denis Potvin	D	1,060	310	742	1,052	.99
Clark Gillies	LW	872	304	359	663	.76
John Tavares	C	669	272	349	621	.93
Brent Sutter	C	694	287	323	610	.88
Josh Bailey	RW	1,057	184	396	580	.55
Brock Nelson	C	901	295	279	574	.64
Pat LaFontaine	C	530	287	279	566	1.07
Anders Lee	LW	923	308	241	549	.59

Goals
Player	Pos	G
Mike Bossy	RW	573
Bryan Trottier	C	500
Denis Potvin	D	310
Anders Lee	LW	308
Clark Gillies	LW	304
Brock Nelson	C	295
Pat LaFontaine	C	287
Brent Sutter	C	287
John Tavares	C	272
Bob Bourne	C	238

Assists
Player	Pos	A
Bryan Trottier	C	853
Denis Potvin	D	742
Mike Bossy	RW	553
Josh Bailey	RW	396
Mathew Barzal*	C	381
Clark Gillies	LW	354
John Tavares	C	349
John Tonelli	LW	338
Patrick Flatley	RW	328
Brent Sutter	C	323

=== Goaltending leaders ===
These goaltenders rank in the top ten in franchise history for wins. Figures are updated after each completed NHL season.

- * – current Islanders player

Note: GP = Games played; W = Wins; L = Losses; T/O = Ties/Overtime losses; GA = Goal against; GAA = Goals against average; SA = Shots against; SV% = Save percentage; SO = Shutouts

Goaltenders
Player	GP	W	L	T/O	GA	GAA	SA	SV%	SO
Billy Smith	674	304	230	104	2,008	3.16	19,082	.895	22
Chico Resch	282	157	69	47	699	2.56	7,874	.911	25
Ilya Sorokin*	308	154	113	38	778	2.60	9,090	.915	29
Rick DiPietro	318	130	136	36	871	2.87	8,915	.902	16
Kelly Hrudey	241	106	90	26	787	3.47	7,112	.889	6
Thomas Greiss	193	101	60	17	471	2.70	5,552	.915	10
Jaroslav Halák	177	88	65	19	460	2.69	5,286	.913	12
Roland Melanson	136	77	34	14	400	3.14	3,990	.900	1
Semyon Varlamov*	173	76	63	21	427	2.57	5,064	.916	16
Glenn Healy	176	66	79	21	564	3.45	5,122	.890	4

=== Individual records ===
- Most goals in a season – Mike Bossy, 69 (1978–79)
- Most assists in a season – Bryan Trottier, 87 (1978–79)
- Most points in a season – Mike Bossy, 147 (1981–82)
- Most penalty minutes in a season – Brian Curran, 356 (1986–87)
- Most points in a season by a defenseman – Denis Potvin, 101 (1978–79)
- Most points in a season by rookie – Bryan Trottier, 95 (1975–76)
- Most wins in a season by a goaltender – Jaroslav Halák, 38 (2014–15)

== Television and radio ==
Most Islanders games are shown locally on sports channels MSG Sportsnet and MSGSN 2. Brendan Burke is the team's play-by-play announcer, while former Islanders players Butch Goring and Thomas Hickey are their color analysts. Shannon Hogan joined the broadcast team for the 2014–15 season as their studio host. Former player Cal Clutterbuck joined Hogan as a part time studio analyst in 2024–25, and became a full time studio and ice level analyst following his retirement in 2025–26.

Until the 2025–26 season the Islanders' radio broadcasts originated on flagship station WRHU (88.7 FM) in Hempstead. In New York City itself, most games air on WEPN, with some airing on WRCN-FM in Riverhead. WRHU is the student radio station of Hofstra University; its signal covers the western section of Long Island and Nassau County. WRCN serves the middle section and Suffolk County. The play-by-play was done by longtime Islanders broadcaster Chris King, and color commentary was provided by Greg Picker. Picker and Cory Wright co-hosted the radio pregame and intermission shows. Hofstra students used to provide reporting for all home games and several away games and were also involved in producing and engineering the broadcasts from on- and off-site.

In New York City itself, WFAN picked up Islanders games from 2016–17 to 2018–19, when it shifted most of its broadcasts to internet streaming on Audacy (formerly Radio.com), which also partnered with the team on other exclusive ancillary content. Previously, public radio station WNYE had been the main Islanders outlet for New York City and its inner suburbs.

The Islanders are unusual among professional sports teams in their use of a noncommercial radio station as its primary outlet. However, the team does not maintain a traditional radio network due to the other New York/New Jersey area teams filling the available tri-state radio stations covering sports. This causes complications with advertising and commercial breaks that do not make a traditional radio network feasible.

WCBS began airing Islanders games starting with the 2016 playoffs, returning the team to a major market New York signal. The games moved to WNYM and WMCA in 2017 before being consolidated on WEPN in 2019.

== See also ==
- List of New York Islanders draft picks
- List of Stanley Cup champions

== Notes ==
Preceded by Montreal Canadiens	Stanley Cup champions 1979–80, 1980–81, 1981–82, 1982–83	Succeeded by Edmonton Oilers
