= Paul Greenwood (money manager) =

American businessman

Paul Greenwood (born 1947) is a former American money manager and town supervisor who was convicted of securities fraud with business partner Stephen Walsh.

== Business career ==
Greenwood and Walsh established their first company in 1979 and became partners and executives at the Greenwich, Connecticut-based WG Trading Company. From 1992 to 1996, Greenwood and Walsh had a controlling stake in the New York Islanders franchise of the National Hockey League.

Prior to his arrest, Greenwood was the town supervisor of North Salem, New York and a treasurer at the local Episcopal Church. He resigned as town supervisor shortly after his arrest. He had a reputation for generosity in the community.

=== Securities fraud case ===
Greenwood and Walsh were arrested on February 24, 2009, and charged with scheming to defraud investors of $554 million. The scheme, which lasted from 1996 to 2009, defrauded investors, including the University of Pittsburgh, Carnegie Mellon University, Wells Fargo Bank, the Sacramento County Employees Retirement System, and the Kern County Employees Retirement Fund. The scheme involved unauthorized investments and the reporting of "arbitrary return rates" to investors that failed to account for losses. The scheme collapsed after the 2008 financial crisis and a National Futures Association audit that revealed promissory notes used by Greenwood and Walsh to account for losses and withdrawals.

On July 28, 2010, Greenwood pleaded guilty to six counts of securities fraud. On December 3, 2014 he was sentenced to a decade in federal prison by Manhattan U.S. District Judge Miriam Goldman Cedarbaum, who told him "many people today lost many thousands of dollars as a result of your fraud."

The sentence was later overturned by the U.S. Court of Appeals for the Second Circuit, which found that Judge Cedarbaum erred in basing the sentence in part on the finding that some victims suffered severe financial harmed, and returned the case to the district court for re-sentencing. At the re-sentencing hearing, Judge Loretta A. Preska, who took over the case after Cedarbaum's death, reduced Greenwood's sentence by five years, citing his long history of charity and significant cooperation with a court-appointed receiver and federal prosecutors (who secured a guilty plea and prison sentence against Walsh); Preska also considered the fact that 98% or 99% of investors had recovered their money. Greenwood expressed remorse for the crime. Greenwood was imprisoned at the federal prison in Butner, North Carolina, and released in July 2019.
