= History of the New York Islanders =

The history of the New York Islanders National Hockey League team dates back to 1972. Since 1980, the franchise has played in five Stanley Cup Final, winning four straight Stanley Cups from 1980 to 1983.

== 1972–1974: The NHL heads to Long Island ==
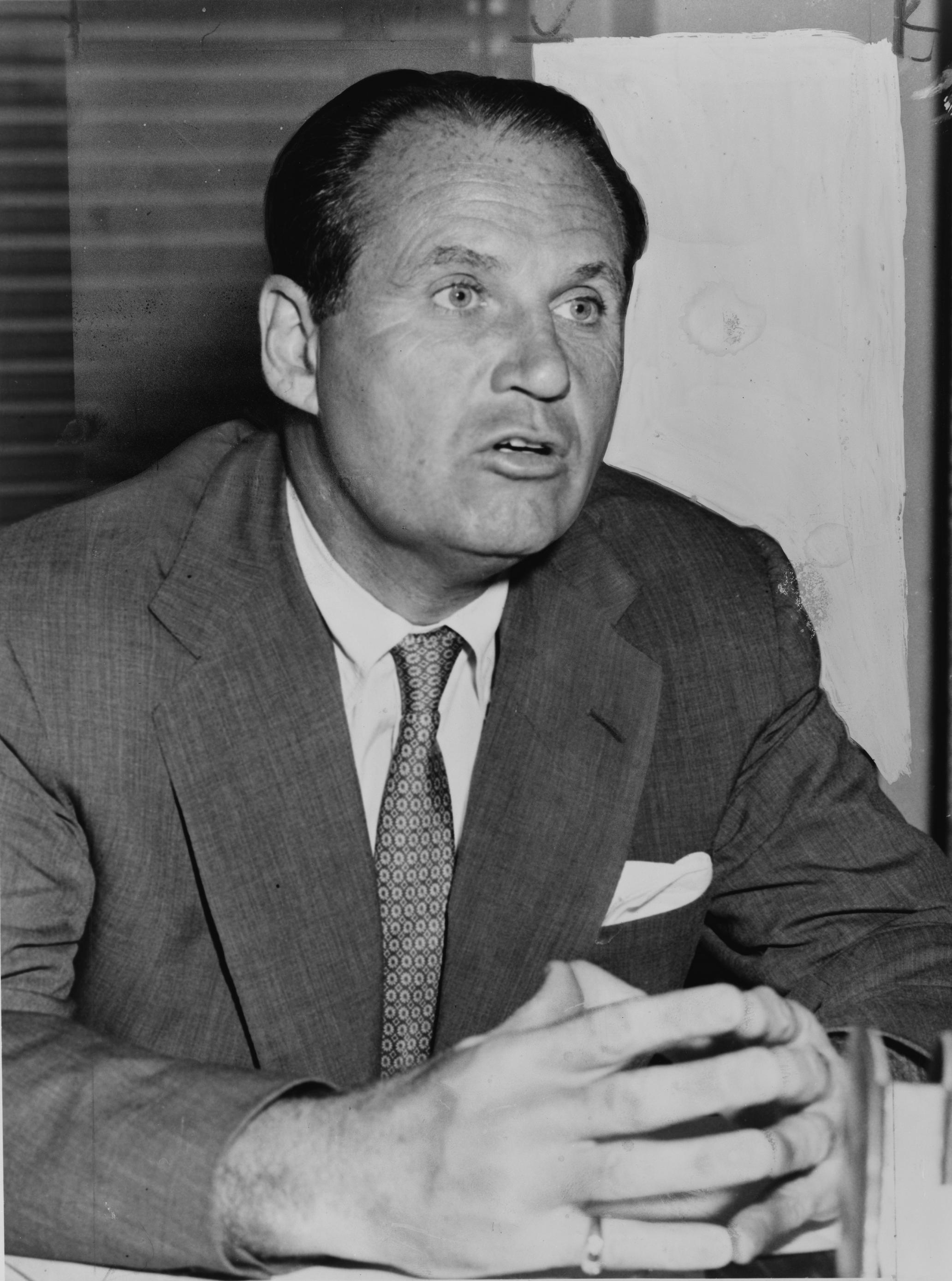
William Shea played a major role in bringing a hockey team to Long Island.

With the impending start of the World Hockey Association (WHA) in the fall of 1972, the upstart league had plans to place its New York team, the Raiders, in Nassau County's brand-new Nassau Veterans Memorial Coliseum. County officials did not consider the WHA a major league and wanted to keep the Raiders out. William Shea, who had helped bring the Major League Baseball's New York Mets to the area a decade earlier, was enlisted to bring an NHL team to Long Island. Shea found a receptive ear in NHL president Clarence Campbell but faced opposition from the New York Rangers, who didn't want additional competition in the New York area. Eventually, Campbell and Shea persuaded the Rangers' owners, Madison Square Garden, to reconsider. Rangers' president Bill Jennings realized that he had two choices. If he allowed another New York-based NHL team, he would at least be able to extract compensation from it for sharing the Rangers' NHL territory. In contrast, a WHA rival would not be obligated to pay the Rangers anything. Perhaps remembering the crucial role the New York Jets had played in ensuring the success of the American Football League just a few years earlier, Jennings ended up helping to bring a new NHL team into town. Despite expanding to 14 teams just two years prior, the NHL hastily awarded a Long Island-based franchise to clothing manufacturer Roy Boe, owner of the American Basketball Association's New York Nets, on November 8, 1971. The terms of the franchise included $6 million ($46.18 million in 2025 dollars) franchise fee plus a $5 million ($38.48 million in 2025 dollars) territorial fee to the Rangers. An expansion franchise was also given to Atlanta (the Flames) to keep the schedule balanced.

The franchise chose New York Islanders as its name, although many expected it to choose the "Long Island Ducks", the name used by a team that played in the Eastern Hockey League from 1959 to 1973. The team was soon nicknamed the "Isles" by the local newspapers. The Islanders' arrival effectively doomed the Raiders, who played in Madison Square Garden under difficult lease terms and were forced to move to Cherry Hill, New Jersey in the middle of their second season.

On February 14, 1972, Bill Torrey, executive vice president of the NHL's California Golden Seals, was named as the team's general manager. The Islanders secured veteran forward Ed Westfall, Gerry Hart, and goaltender Billy Smith in the 1972 expansion draft, along with junior league stars Billy Harris, Lorne Henning, and Bobby Nystrom in the 1972 amateur draft. Soon after the draft, Phil Goyette was named as the team's first head coach, however he was fired halfway through the season and replaced with Earl Ingarfield and assistant coach Aut Erickson. Unlike most other expansion teams' general managers, Torrey made few trades for veteran players in the early years, as he was committed to building the team through the draft; he stated, "I told the owners that we're not going to beat this team next door by taking the castoffs from others teams. We'd have to develop our own stars." Before the season began, Westfall was named the team's first captain. Their first win came on October 12, 1972, in a 3–2 game against the Los Angeles Kings. In the team's first season, young players such as Smith, Nystrom, and Henning (all of whom would be part of the Islanders dynasty that would win four straight Stanley Cups in the 1980s) were given chances to prove themselves in the NHL. However, the young and inexperienced expansion team posted a record of 12–60–6, setting an NHL record for number of losses and worst overall record in a season. A rare highlight occurred on January 18 when they defeated the defending Stanley Cup Champion Boston Bruins 9–7.

Finishing last in the standings that season, they received the right to select first in the 1973 draft. Off the ice, the Islanders struggled financially, a situation that was exacerbated by the then unprecedented 11 million dollars in franchise and territorial fees. Montreal Canadiens' general manager Sam Pollock was keen to acquire the Islanders' pick so he could bring French Canadian junior star defenseman Denis Potvin, who had been touted as "the next Bobby Orr" when he was 14 years old, to Montreal. Pollock made several lucrative trade offers including cash to the Islanders, but Torrey turned the Canadiens down and selected Potvin with the first overall pick. During the off-season, Torrey convinced former St. Louis Blues coach Al Arbour to come coach the Islanders. Even with Arbour as the team's head coach and Potvin, who won the Calder Memorial Trophy as NHL Rookie of the Year, the team again finished last in the East Division that season, but allowed 100 fewer goals than the previous season. The season included their first win against the Rangers, on October 27, 1973, which also happened to be the game where Potvin scored his first NHL goal. Although they failed to make the playoffs, their 56 points represented a 26-point improvement from the previous season.

== 1974–1979: Ascendancy and playoff inability ==
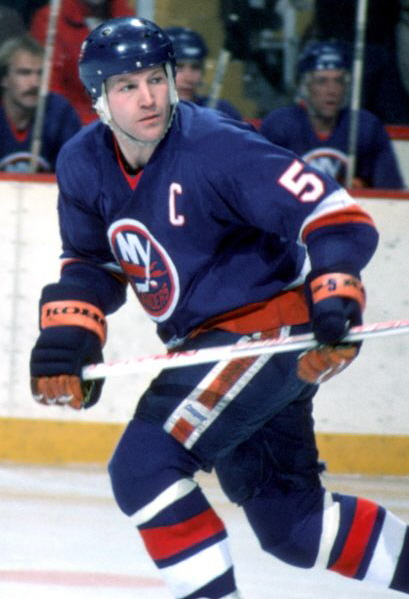
Hall of Fame defenseman Denis Potvin led the Islanders to their postseason success in the '70s and '80s.

With the fourth and twenty-second picks in the 1974 draft, the Islanders added young forwards Clark Gillies and Bryan Trottier to continue Torrey's building plan. In 1975, the Islanders made one of the biggest turnarounds in NHL history. Led by Potvin, forwards Westfall, Harris, Nystrom, Gillies, and goaltenders Smith and Glenn "Chico" Resch, the team earned 88 points, 32 more than the previous season and two more than their first two seasons combined, earning their first playoff berth. They defeated the rival New York Rangers in a best-of-3 first-round series as J. P. Parise scored just 11 seconds into overtime of the third game. In the next round, down three games to none in a best-of-seven series against the Pittsburgh Penguins, the Islanders rallied to win the next four and take the series, winning game seven on a late third period goal by Westfall. Only four other major North American professional sports teams have accomplished this feat (the 1941–42 Toronto Maple Leafs, Major League Baseball's 2004 Boston Red Sox, the 2009–10 Philadelphia Flyers, and the 2013–14 Los Angeles Kings). They were close but not as lucky in the following round, rallying from another 3–0 deficit to force a seventh game against the defending Stanley Cup champion Philadelphia Flyers before the Flyers took the decisive seventh game at home and went on to win the Cup again. Despite a disappointing playoff finish, Arbour remained complimentary of the team's attitude and maturity, saying "If I called a practice next week, every one of them would show up."

The Islanders continued their climb up the standings in 1975–76, earning 101 points and the fifth-best record in the league. It was the first 100-point season in Islanders history, in only their fourth year of existence. Rookie center Trottier finished the season scoring 95 points and winning the Calder Memorial Trophy; his points and assists (63) totals set a new league record for most in each category by a rookie. It would be the first of four consecutive 100-point seasons, including the first two division titles in franchise history. Despite the emergence of young star players and regular season success between 1976 and 1979 the Islanders suffered a series of playoff disappointments. In 1976 and 1977, the Islanders were knocked out in the semi-finals by eventual Stanley Cup champions, the Montreal Canadiens. The Canadiens posted a 24–3 record in the playoffs during those two years with all three losses coming from the Islanders.

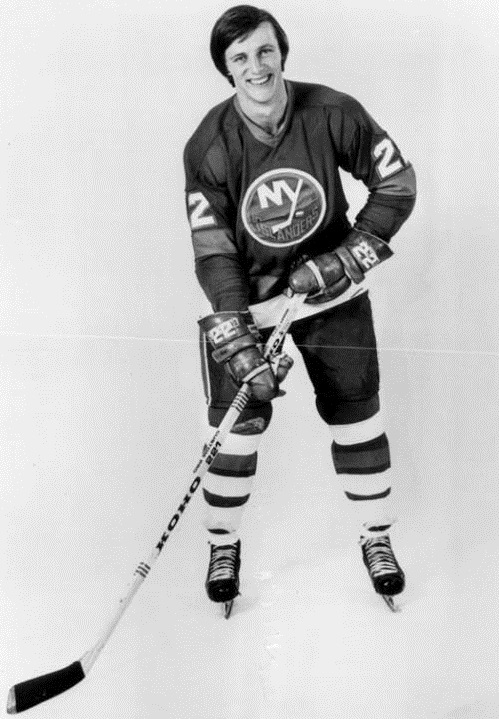
Mike Bossy was selected with the 15th overall pick in 1977 and became the third Islander to win the Calder Memorial Trophy in his first season.

In the 1977 draft, Torrey had the 15th overall pick and was deciding between forwards Mike Bossy and Dwight Foster. Bossy was known as an emerging scorer who lacked physicality, while Foster could check and had led the Ontario Hockey League in scoring. Arbour persuaded Torrey to pick Bossy, arguing it was easier to teach a scorer how to check. In the upcoming 1977–78 season, Bossy became the third Islander to win the Calder Trophy, having scored 53 goals that season, the most scored by a rookie at the time. The team earned their first Patrick Division and Campbell Conference championships. Six players finished the season with 30 goals scored or more, with five of them being players drafted by the Islanders, showing the success of the draft building process. The season ended with a familiar result as the team lost in the overtime during playoffs game seven of the quarterfinals against the Toronto Maple Leafs; Billy Harris failed on a breakaway which was followed by Lanny McDonald scoring to complete an upset.

In 1978–79, the team finished with the best record in the NHL, clinching it with three goals in the third period of the seasons final game against the Rangers. Trottier was voted the league MVP and captured the scoring title, while sophomore Bossy scored 69 goals, which also led the league. Despite their regular season dominance, the Islanders exited the playoffs with another upset playoff loss, this time to the Rangers in the semi-finals. As the team was leaving Madison Square Garden following their game six elimination, Rangers fans rocked and threw objects at the team's bus. Hockey professionals and journalists generally questioned whether the Islanders were capable of winning the important games needed to win a Stanley Cup. Islander players would cite fear of repeating the pain of this loss as spurring their later success. After surrendering the captaincy to Gillies the season before, Westfall retired and shortly thereafter became a color commentator on the team's telecasts.

Off the ice, the Islanders were on shaky ground. Boe was losing money on both the Islanders and the Nets even as the Islanders quickly surged to NHL prominence and the Nets became an American Basketball Association power. The Islanders were still far behind on the $10 million they had paid in startup costs, and the expenses associated with moving the Nets to the National Basketball Association threw Boe's finances into a tailspin. Eventually, Boe was forced to sell both his teams. He readily found a buyer for the Nets, but had less luck finding one for the Islanders. Torrey orchestrated a sale to one of the team's limited partners, John Pickett, who assigned Torrey as team president. Soon after purchasing the team, Pickett signed a very lucrative cable contract with the fledgling SportsChannel network as their owner, Charles Dolan, thought the up-and-coming Islanders would be a perfect centerpiece for his new network. Dolan gave Pickett a long-term guaranteed contract intended to not only keep the team on Long Island, but give area governments an incentive to renew his cable contracts. The Islanders have remained on the network, now known as MSG Plus, for over a quarter-century.

== 1980–1983: The Dynasty ==
After the Islanders' regular season dominance and playoff disappointment in 1979, Arbour decided that he would no longer concern himself too greatly with his team's finish in the regular season. Instead, he focused his team's energy on how they would perform in the playoffs. In 1980, the Islanders dropped below the 100-point mark for the first time in five years, earning only 91 points. However, they finally broke through and won the Stanley Cup.

Before the playoffs, Torrey made the difficult decision to trade longtime and popular veterans Billy Harris and defenseman Dave Lewis to the Los Angeles Kings for second line center Butch Goring. Goring's arrival is often called the "final piece of the puzzle": a strong two-way player, his presence on the second line ensured that opponents would no longer be able to focus their defensive efforts on the Islanders' first line of Bossy, Trottier and Clark Gillies. Contributions from new teammates, such as wingers Duane Sutter and Anders Kallur and stay-at-home defensemen Dave Langevin, Gord Lane, and Ken Morrow (the latter fresh off a gold medal win at the 1980 Olympics), also figured prominently in the Islanders' playoff success.

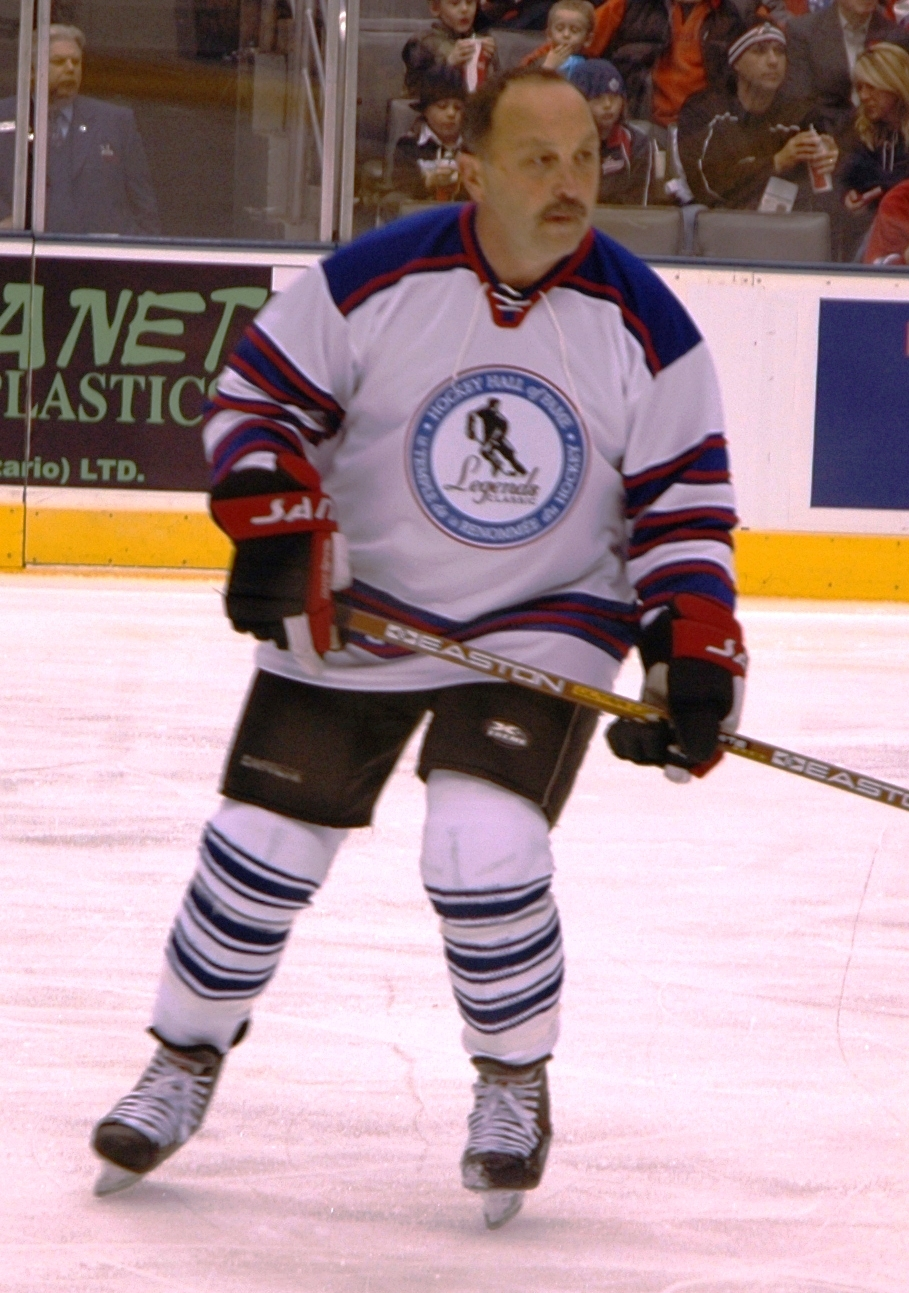
Bryan Trottier won the Conn Smythe Trophy as the team's Most Valuable Player for their run in the 1979–80 playoffs

In the semi-finals, the Islanders faced the Buffalo Sabres, who had finished second overall in the NHL standings. The Islanders won the first two games in Buffalo, including a 2–1 victory in game two on Bob Nystrom's goal in double overtime. They went on to win the series in six games and reach the finals for the first time in franchise history, where they would face the NHL's regular season champions, the Philadelphia Flyers, who had gone undefeated for 35 straight games (25–0–10) during the regular season. In game one in Philadelphia, the Islanders won 4–3 on Denis Potvin's power-play goal in overtime. Leading the series 3–2, they went home to Long Island for game six. In that game the Islanders blew a 4–2 lead in the third period but Bob Nystrom continued his overtime heroics, scoring at 7:11 of the extra frame, on assists by John Tonelli and Lorne Henning, to bring Long Island its first Stanley Cup. This was the most recent Stanley Cup clinching game won in overtime by the home team until the Los Angeles Kings pulled it off in 2014. It was also the Islanders' sixth overtime victory of the playoffs. Bryan Trottier won the Conn Smythe Trophy as the most valuable player in the playoffs. Torrey's strategy of building through the draft turned out very well; nearly all of the major contributors on the 1980 champions were home-grown Islanders or had spent most of their NHL careers in the Islanders organization. The Islanders were the first NHL team to win a Stanley Cup (in 1980) with Europeans (Stefan Persson, Anders Kallur) on its roster.

The Islanders dominated the next two seasons. Bossy scored 50 goals in 50 games in 1981 and the Islanders lost only three playoff games en route to defeating the Minnesota North Stars in five games to win the Stanley Cup. Butch Goring won the Conn Smythe Trophy. During their semi-final sweep of the Rangers, Islander fans began taunting the Rangers with a chant of "1940!" – referring to the Rangers' last Stanley Cup win in 1940 (the Rangers would not win the cup again until 1994). Fans in other NHL cities soon picked up the chant.

These four banners hang in Nassau Veterans Memorial Coliseum and represent the four Stanley Cup championships the Islanders won from 1980 through 1983.

In 1981–82 the Islanders won a then-record 15 straight games en route to a franchise-record 118 points, while Mike Bossy set a scoring record for right wingers with 147 points in an 80-game schedule. The Islanders won the regular-season title, yet once in the playoffs against the Pittsburgh Penguins they found themselves down late in the third period of deciding game five before John Tonelli scored both the tying goal and the overtime winner. After defeating the Rangers in six games they swept both the upstart Quebec Nordiques and the Cinderella story Vancouver Canucks in the first ever coast-to-coast Stanley Cup Final for their third straight championship. During that series Bossy, upended by a check from Tiger Williams and falling parallel to the ice, managed to hook the puck with his stick and score. Bossy netted the Stanley Cup-winning goal and was awarded the Conn Smythe Trophy.

The next year, although the Islanders had won three straight Stanley Cups, more attention was being paid to the upstart Edmonton Oilers, whose young superstar Wayne Gretzky had just shattered existing scoring records. The 1982–83 season was thus a battle to decide which was the best team in the NHL. The Oilers had a better regular season, but the Islanders swept them in the Stanley Cup Final to win their fourth straight championship. Billy Smith was named the Most Valuable Player of the Playoffs after shutting down the Oilers' vaunted scoring machine. Gretzky failed to score a goal during the series. The Sutter brothers, Duane and Brent, scored 7 and 5 points respectively in the first 3 games, while Bossy again scored the Stanley Cup-winning goal in game four. After that game, the Oilers players walked past the Islanders' dressing room and were surprised to see the champions exhausted. Oilers players such as Gretzky and Mark Messier said that they realized at that moment how much it would actually take to win the Stanley Cup.

== 1984–1991: Post-dynasty and the Easter Epic ==
The Islanders finished the 1983–84 regular season tied atop the Prince of Wales Conference while successfully defending their Patrick Division title. The "Drive for Five" got off to a tense start. With 39 seconds remaining of the deciding game of the opening round against the Rangers they gave up the tying goal to Don Maloney that the Islanders felt was illegal because Maloney's stick was too high. They ultimately eliminated the Rangers for the fourth consecutive year. The team then defeated the Washington Capitals in five games and the Montreal Canadiens in six to set up a finals rematch with the Oilers. The series featured rookie Pat LaFontaine scoring two third period goals in 38 seconds. This time, the Oilers dethroned the Islanders to win the first of what would be five Stanley Cups in seven years. For the 1984 postseason, the NHL changed the home and away schedule for the finals, which provided the Islanders home ice advantage in the series based on winning a regular season game against the Oilers, despite finishing lower than them in the overall standings. The new format had them play three straight games in Edmonton, where the Oilers managed to lock up the series. Bossy cited the team's hard time winning an away game as their downfall in the series. The Oilers also ended the Islanders' 19 series playoff winning streak. It remains the longest streak in the history of professional sports (one more than the 1959–67 streak by the Boston Celtics of the National Basketball Association). Unlike the 1976–79 Montreal Canadiens, who needed to win three series in the 1976 and 1977 playoffs under the playoff format in place at that time, the Islanders had to win four series in each of their Stanley Cup seasons.

The Islanders remained competitive for the rest of the decade, even as some of the stars from the Cup teams departed. As the decade wore on, Pickett began to keep the money from the team's cable deal rather than reinvest it in the team as he had done in years past. Although it did not become clear immediately, the lack of funds limited Torrey's ability to replace all of the departing talent. In the 1984–85 NHL season, the Islanders slipped to third in their division, followed by similar results in the 1985–86 and 1986–87 seasons. They began facing stiff competition from division rivals, the Philadelphia Flyers, who eliminated the Islanders in the Patrick Division Finals in 1985 and 1987, and the Washington Capitals, who swept the Islanders' 1986 first round series, the team's first exit without winning a playoff round since 1978.

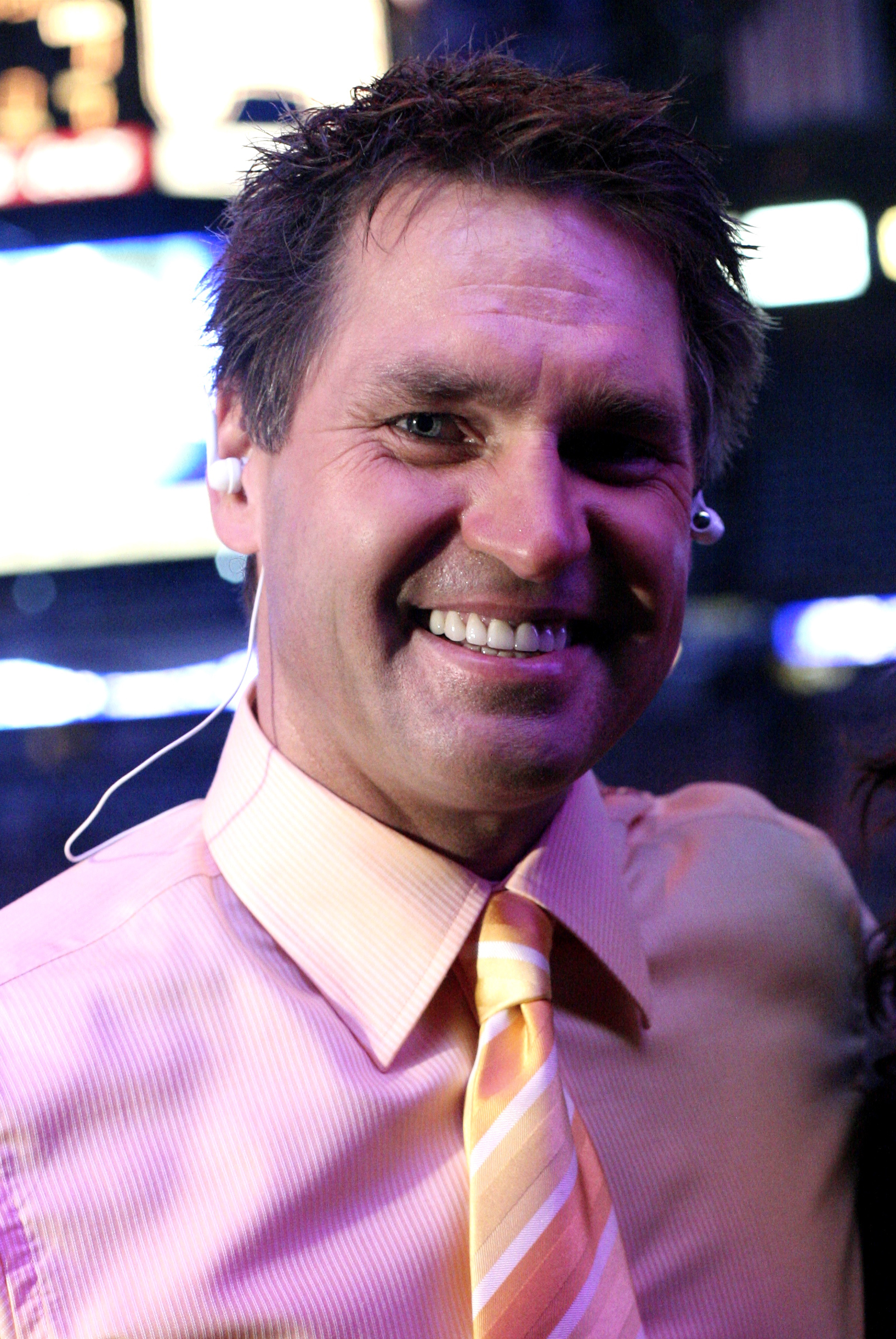
Kelly Hrudey (pictured in 2006) saved 73 of 75 shots in the "Easter Epic" for the Islanders, who came out victorious after four periods of overtime play.

In 1986, Nystrom retired due to a serious injury and Clark Gillies was picked up on waivers by the Buffalo Sabres. Arbour retired as coach following the 1985–86 season and was replaced by longtime junior hockey coach Terry Simpson. During the first round of the 1987 playoffs against the Capitals, the Islanders had fallen behind in the series three games to one but were not eliminated due to a playoff format change from a best-of-5 series to a best-of-7. The Islanders evened the series, which set the stage for one of the most famous games in NHL history: the "Easter Epic". Kelly Hrudey stopped 73 shots on goal while Pat LaFontaine scored at 8:47 of the fourth overtime—and at 1:56 a.m. on Easter Sunday morning. The win came even though the Islanders had been outshot 75–52. They were eliminated in the Patrick Division finals in seven games by the Flyers. Chronic back pain forced Mike Bossy to retire after the season.

The following season, the Islanders captured another division title, but were defeated in the first round of the playoffs by the upstart New Jersey Devils. Potvin retired after the playoffs, holding records for most career goals (310), assists (742) and points (1052) by a defenseman, though he has since been passed in these categories by Ray Bourque and Paul Coffey. Around this time, the team's run of good luck in the draft began to run out. Of their four top draft picks from 1987 to 1990, they lost one to a freak knee injury and two others never panned out.

The 1988–89 season saw the Islanders win only seven of their first 27 games. Torrey fired Simpson and brought Arbour back. Arbour was unable to turn things around, and the team finished with 61 points, tied with the Quebec Nordiques for the worst record in the league. It was their first losing season and the first time missing the playoffs since their second season. Smith, the last remaining original Islanders player, retired after the season to become the team's goaltending coach. Not long after the end of the season, Pickett moved to Florida and turned over day-to-day operations over to a committee of four Long Island entrepreneurs: Ralph Palleschi, Bob Rosenthal, Stephen Walsh, and Paul Greenwood. In return, they each bought a 2.5 interest in the team. In the next season, the Islanders rebounded to get back in the playoffs, but fell to the Rangers in five games of the opening round. The team bought out the remaining years of Bryan Trottier's contract, sending him off with a team record of games played. The 1990–91 season had the team finish well out of the playoffs after winning only 25 games.

== 1991–1995: New faces and the miracle of 1993 ==
LaFontaine, the Islanders' remaining superstar, was frustrated with the team's lack of success and the progress of his contract negotiations, and held out rather than report to camp before 1991–92. In response to the holdout, Torrey engineered a rebuilding project with two blockbuster trades on October 25, 1991. He dealt LaFontaine, Randy Wood and Randy Hillier (along with future considerations) to the Buffalo Sabres in return for Pierre Turgeon, Benoit Hogue, Uwe Krupp and Dave McLlwain. He also sent longtime captain Brent Sutter and Brad Lauer to the Chicago Blackhawks for Steve Thomas and Adam Creighton. With these additions and a talented core of players such as Derek King, Ray Ferraro, and Patrick Flatley, along with incoming Soviet players Vladimir Malakhov and Darius Kasparaitis, the Islanders had a new foundation in the early '90s. However, the management committee was not nearly as patient as Boe and Pickett had been, and forced Torrey to resign after the Islanders missed the playoffs again that season. Assistant general manager Don Maloney was hired in Torrey's place, while Torrey quickly resurfaced with the expansion Florida Panthers.

In Maloney's first year, 1992–93, the Islanders rebounded to make the playoffs, in the process surpassing the 80-point mark for the first time in six years. The LaFontaine-Turgeon trade proved successful for both the Islanders and Sabres, as both players hit career highs in points and Turgeon won the Lady Byng Trophy.

Ray Ferraro emerged as a playoff hero, scoring a pair of overtime winners in the first round series against the Capitals. Instead of celebrating after winning game six at Nassau Coliseum, however, the Islanders were both irate and despondent. Turgeon, the team's star center and leading scorer, suffered a shoulder separation when Dale Hunter checked him from behind as he celebrated a series-clinching goal. Turgeon was believed to be out for the entire second round, if not longer. He returned only for spot power play duty in the last game of the second round. Hunter received a then-record 21-game suspension.

The Islanders' next opponent, the Pittsburgh Penguins, were twice-defending Stanley Cup champions and full of stars such as Mario Lemieux, Jaromir Jagr, and Ron Francis. The Penguins had roared through the regular season with 119 points, as well as recording a record 17 consecutive wins towards the end of the season, and were overwhelmingly favored to win a third straight championship. Jim Smith of Newsday, Long Island's hometown newspaper, predicted that with Turgeon on the sidelines, the Penguins would sweep the Islanders out of the playoffs. However, on the strength of outstanding goaltending from Glenn Healy and contributions from all four lines, the Islanders achieved a huge upset when David Volek scored at 5:16 of overtime of the deciding seventh game. Newsday's front page the day following the win was a picture of Healy with a headline reading, "It's a Miracle!" This was the last playoff series won by the Islanders for 23 years, until the 2015–16 season. Turgeon returned to the Islanders' top line for the Wales Conference Finals against the Montreal Canadiens, though he was not in peak form as he had not fully recovered. The Islanders bowed out of the playoffs after a hard-fought five games, two of which went to overtime. After beating the Islanders, the Canadiens went on to win the Cup.

Maloney had avoided making many personnel changes his first year, but on the eve of the 1993 expansion draft he traded backup goaltender Mark Fitzpatrick to the Quebec Nordiques for Ron Hextall. The clubs also exchanged first-round picks in the deal. Able to protect only one netminder in the Expansion Draft, the Islanders left Healy exposed. He was claimed by the Mighty Ducks of Anaheim, then was claimed by the Tampa Bay Lightning in Phase II of the draft the next day, and finally had his rights traded to the Rangers, where he was the backup.

The Islanders barely squeezed past the Panthers to make the 1994 playoffs before being swept in a lopsided opening series by the first-place Rangers, who went on to win the Cup. Arbour retired for good as coach and was succeeded by longtime assistant Lorne Henning. Hextall, who allowed 16 goals in three games, drew most of the criticism for the failed playoff campaign and was shipped to Philadelphia for Tommy Soderstrom in September. In the lockout-shortened 1994–95 season, the Islanders not only failed to qualify for the playoffs, they finished ahead of only the third-year Ottawa Senators.

== 1995–2000: Management issues ==
By the end of the 1994–95 season, Maloney was under considerable heat from the press and fan base for his handling of the team. Since taking over in 1992, the only noticeable attempt he made to upgrade the roster was the acquisition of Hextall. Near the end of the failed 1995 campaign, Maloney decided that the core of players he had left alone for three seasons needed to be revamped, leading to a rebuilding project. He traded Turgeon and Malakhov to the Montreal Canadiens for Kirk Muller and Mathieu Schneider, while Hogue was sent to Toronto for young goaltender Eric Fichaud. Additionally, Maloney allowed the team's leading scorer, Ferraro, to depart as an unrestricted free agent at the conclusion of the season. Fans' displeasure at Maloney for trading the popular Turgeon was magnified when Muller balked at joining a rebuilding team. He played 45 games for the Islanders before being sent to Toronto as well.

Before the 1995–96 season, Maloney fired Henning and named Mike Milbury head coach. The same year, the Islanders' attempt at updating their look resulted in the unveiling of a new team logo of a slicker-clad fisherman holding a hockey stick. Islanders fans disliked it, and rival Rangers' fans mockingly called the Islanders "fishsticks"—mocking how the logo resembled the Gorton's Fisherman. The team reverted to a modified version of the old logo as soon as the league allowed them to do so. The year was a disappointment on the ice as well, as the Islanders finished in last place with a record of 22–50–10. During the season, team management fired Maloney, whom fans blamed for the team's downfall, and gave Milbury full control of hockey operations as both a coach and general manager. Milbury went on to resign as head coach during the following season and elevated assistant Rick Bowness to the position. After another unsuccessful season with little improvement, Milbury took over as coach again during the 1997–98 season. The team improved to fourth place in their division but again failed to make the playoffs. Milbury followed by once again stepping down as coach during the following season while retaining his job as general manager.

During the continued playoff drought, instability in the front office mirrored the Islanders' substandard performance on the ice. Pickett sold the team to Dallas businessman John Spano in 1996. However, three months after the 1997 closing, Spano had only paid Pickett a fraction of the first installment on the cable rights deal. Several Islanders executives tipped off Newsday that something was amiss about their new boss. In July, Newsday exposed Spano as a fraud who did not have the assets required to complete the deal. The investigation showed that Spano had deliberately misled the NHL and the Islanders about his net worth, and also had two lawsuits pending against him. Within days of the report, Spano was forced to relinquish the team to Pickett. Federal prosecutors turned up evidence that Spano had forged many of the documents used to vouch for his wealth and to promise payment to Pickett, and even appeared to have sent many of the documents from his own office in Dallas. He was sentenced to 71 months in prison for bank and wire fraud. The NHL took additional heat when reports surfaced that the league spent well under $1,000 (depending on the source, the league spent either $525 or $750) to check Spano's background. It subsequently stiffened the process for vetting future owners. The incident and its aftermath were covered in the ESPN 30 for 30 documentary, Big Shot. Pickett finally found a buyer, a group led by Howard Milstein and Phoenix Coyotes co-owner Steven Gluckstern, a deal which almost fell through when Spectacor Management Group, which managed the Coliseum for Nassau County, tried to force Pickett to certify that the Coliseum was safe. Pickett refused, since the Coliseum had fallen into disrepair in recent seasons. SMG backed down under pressure from the Islanders, the NHL, and Nassau County officials.

Initially, the team made numerous trades and increased their payroll in an effort to assemble a better team. In one transaction, young players Todd Bertuzzi and Bryan McCabe were traded for veteran Trevor Linden. After the Islanders finished 12 points short of the playoffs in the 1997–98 season, however, Milstein and Gluckstern decided to run the team on an austere budget in an attempt to make a profit. They also complained about the condition of the Nassau Coliseum and made noises about moving the team elsewhere. They began trading or releasing many popular players to avoid paying their salaries, including star scorer Zigmund Palffy, team captain Linden, former rookie of the year Bryan Berard, and rugged defenseman Rich Pilon. Losing the highly regarded players, the team finished with similar results the next two seasons. Attendance, which had been in a steady decline over the past few years, decreased even further to under 12,000 per game. Around that time, Milstein bid hundreds of millions of dollars in unsuccessful attempts to purchase the National Football League's Washington Redskins and Cleveland Browns.

== 2000–2006: New ownership and a return to the playoffs ==
Let's face it, the Coliseum is a dump, and the team, well, they're losers. It's a real shame. We want to see it change because this is our home. We all deserve better.

— Charles Wang

In 2000, Milstein and Gluckstern sold the team to Computer Associates executives Charles Wang and Sanjay Kumar. The sale cost $187.5 million ($350.54 million in 2025 dollars) and gave fans hope for the team to turn its lack of success around. The new owners allowed Milbury to spend money and invest in free agents. His first attempt proved unpopular with fans, as he traded away future star players Roberto Luongo and Olli Jokinen to the Florida Panthers for Oleg Kvasha and Mark Parrish. Milbury then further surprised the hockey world when he took Rick DiPietro with the first selection in the 2000 draft, ahead of consensus picks Dany Heatley and Marian Gaborik. Reporters and fans were alternately confused and enraged by the moves, which Milbury acknowledged, saying, "As dangerous as this may be, we think Mad Mike maybe has something going for him." Establishing a record of controversial decisions, Milbury held onto the "Mad Mike" nickname for years to follow. He remained adamant that his moves were to immediately improve the team, whose poor winning percentage that year was only ahead of only that of the franchise's first season. The team's uninspired play led Milbury to fire head coach and past player Butch Goring. Fans vocalized their dislike of Goring taking the fall rather than Milbury, which was further worsened when Milbury passed on hiring Ted Nolan as Goring's successor; Instead, Boston Bruins assistant coach Peter Laviolette was hired.

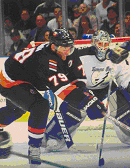
The Islanders acquired Alexei Yashin (left) prior to the 2001–02 season. Yashin would go on to become the team's captain in later years.

Three key personnel acquisitions were made prior to the 2001–02 season, Laviolette's first. Alexei Yashin was acquired from the Ottawa Senators in exchange for forward Bill Muckalt, defenseman Zdeno Chara and the Islanders' second overall pick in the 2001 draft. Next, Islanders prospects Tim Connolly and Taylor Pyatt were traded to the Buffalo Sabres in exchange for Michael Peca, who became the team's captain. By virtue of finishing with the worst record in the previous season, Detroit Red Wings goaltender Chris Osgood was the next addition, taken as the first pick in the September 2001 waiver draft, adding a former Stanley Cup championship goaltender without giving up any players in exchange. The additions proved to be a great help, as the team opened the season with a 9–0–1–1 record, the best in franchise history. They finished the season with new broken records; their 96 points marked the fourth biggest one-year turn-around in the league's history (44 points higher than the previous season), while Osgood's 66 starts surpassed Billy Smith's previous record of 65. During the 2002 Stanley Cup playoffs, they were seeded fifth and faced the fourth-seeded Toronto Maple Leafs. The Islanders lost in a very physical first round series in seven games; the home team won every game of the series. Notably, game five featured Gary Roberts charging Islander defenseman Kenny Jonsson, and Darcy Tucker submarining Peca with a questionable check that tore the Islander captain's anterior cruciate ligament, sidelining both players for the series' final game. The situation between Tucker and Peca caused a bit of outrage, with speculation that Tucker had intended to injury Peca before the game has even began, which Tucker denied.

Despite the promise shown in the Toronto playoff series, the Islanders had a slow start to the 2002–03 season. They rebounded to make the playoffs, but lost a five-game series in the first round to the top-seeded Ottawa Senators. Milbury continued his controversial move-making by firing Laviolette after the season, citing post-season interviews with the players in which they expressed a lack of confidence in the coach. He was replaced with Steve Stirling, who had previously been coaching the team's top minor league affiliate, the Bridgeport Sound Tigers. In the following season, the Islanders again lost in the first round of the playoffs, this time to the eventual champion Tampa Bay Lightning.

Following the 2004–05 NHL lockout, which eliminated that season of play, the Islanders made several player moves to increase offense for following season. Peca was traded to the Edmonton Oilers for center Mike York, freeing up room under the NHL's new salary cap. The same day, the team signed winger Miroslav Satan to play alongside Yashin. Milbury also worked on remaking the team's defense, adding Alexei Zhitnik, Brad Lukowich and Brent Sopel to replace the departed Adrian Aucoin and Roman Hamrlik, who left as free agents, and Jonsson, who left the NHL to play in the HockeyAllsvenskan in Sweden. In the aftermath, Yashin was named as the team's new captain. The team's inconsistent play led to Stirling's dismissal midway through the season.

== 2006–2009: Management shake-ups and the Rick DiPietro contract ==
On the day of Stirling's firing, January 11, 2006, Milbury also announced that he would step down as general manager once a successor was found. He served as vice president of Wang's sports properties for one year before resigning in May 2007. Wang proceeded by hiring Neil Smith as general manager and Ted Nolan as head coach, following a brief stint by Brad Shaw as the team's interim head coach. Smith, however, was fired after approximately one month and quickly replaced by the team's backup goaltender Garth Snow, who retired from his playing career to accept the position. Before his dismissal, Smith made several free agent acquisitions, including defensemen Brendan Witt and Tom Poti, and forwards Mike Sillinger and Chris Simon.

On September 12, 2006, the Islanders signed DiPietro to a 15-year, $67.5 million ($107.8 million in 2025 dollars) contract, which was believed to be the longest contract to date in the NHL and the second-longest in North American sports, behind a 25-year contract for National Basketball Association player Magic Johnson. DiPietro, Wang and Snow all spoke confidently and felt it was the best move for both sides, despite the mixed reactions it received from the rest of the hockey world. Specifically, Wang stated, "This is not a big deal. You have to have a commitment to who you're working with." As speculation began as to whether other teams would follow suit and give lengthy contracts to star players, Atlanta Thrashers' general manager Don Waddell felt that, "It's highly unlikely that you will see teams go beyond that. This is a once-in-a-lifetime contract. Ownership must feel very strongly that he's their guy for the next 15 years."

The new-look Islanders were picked by most analysts to languish towards the bottom of the standings. Eyeing a playoff spot, Snow traded for forward Ryan Smyth from the Edmonton Oilers at the trade deadline on February 27, 2007. Injuries to DiPietro and a distracting stick swinging incident that resulted in Simon's suspension for the rest of the season provided extra setbacks, but not enough to drop the team from playoff contention. They qualified for the post-season, assisted by a late-season winning steak and a 3–2 shootout victory against the New Jersey Devils in their final regular season game. Despite DiPietro's return to the team in time for the playoffs, the team lost their first round matchup in five games to the Presidents' Trophy-winning Buffalo Sabres.

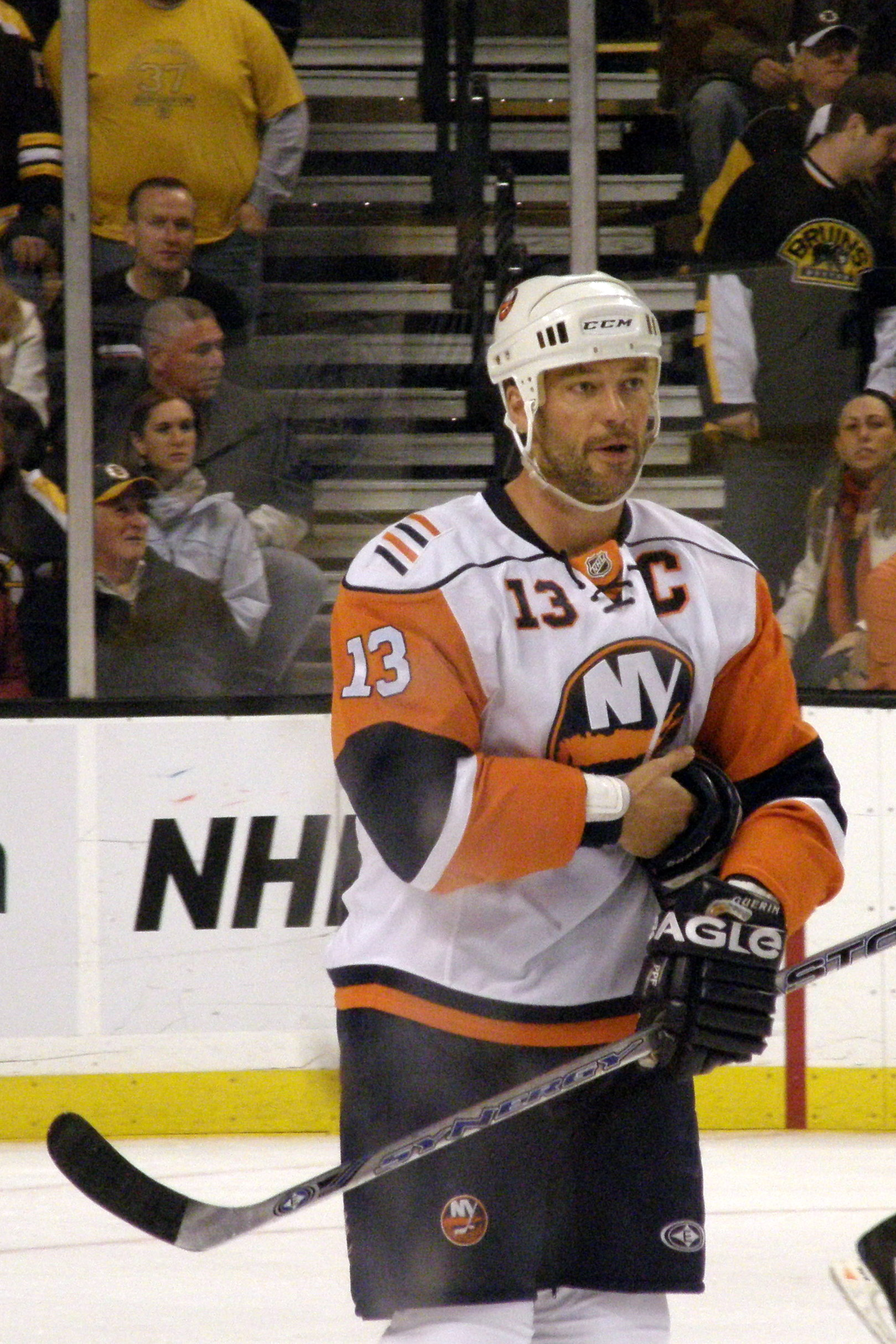
Bill Guerin was the New York Islanders' captain from 2007 through mid-2009.

Management announced in June 2007 that they would buy out captain Alexei Yashin's contract, which had four seasons remaining on it. Free agents Smyth, Poti, Viktor Kozlov, Jason Blake, and Richard Zednik also left in July 2007. During that month, the Islanders signed Bill Guerin to a two-year contract as he immediately assumed team captaincy. Also in the off-season, free agents Mike Comrie, Andy Sutton and Jon Sim joined the team. That summer, it was announced that Nolan extended an invitation to Al Arbour to return as a coach for one game in order to bring his total number of games coached to 1,500. Arbour signed a one-day contract, the shortest in league history, on November 3, 2007; it put him behind the bench the following day as the Islanders defeated the Pittsburgh Penguins 3–2, raising his career coaching win total to 740. The team remained in the playoff hunt through the trade deadline as they resigned Comrie to a one-year contract and traded away Simon and Marc-Andre Bergeron. A rash of injuries saw them plummet to the fifth-worst record in the league by the end of the season.

At the 2008 NHL entry draft, the Islanders made two trades to move down from the fifth to the ninth overall pick, with which they selected center Josh Bailey. They also added free agents Mark Streit and Doug Weight. The team dismissed head coach Ted Nolan over alleged philosophy differences, and later that summer replaced him with Scott Gordon. Near the trade deadline, Snow traded Comrie and Chris Campoli to the Ottawa Senators in exchange for forward Dean McAmmond and the San Jose Sharks' first-round draft pick in the 2009 NHL entry draft and sent captain Bill Guerin to the Pittsburgh Penguins in exchange for a conditional draft pick.

In the 2008–09 season, the Islanders finished in last place in the league with a record of 26–47–9, which was the team's worst record since the 2000–01 season. After the conclusion of regular season, they won the draft lottery to retain the first overall pick in the 2009 NHL entry draft.

== 2009–2015: The John Tavares era begins ==
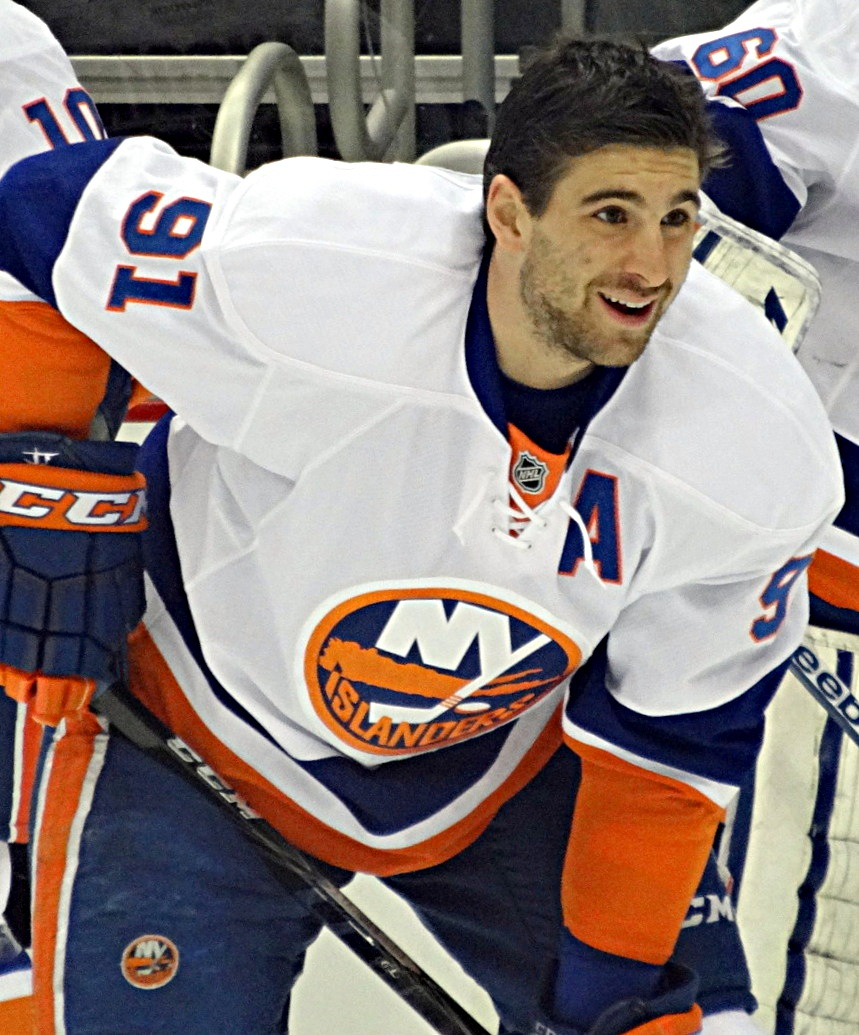
John Tavares, former captain of the Islanders who left in free agency

Beginning an effort to rebuild the team with new and young talent, the Islanders selected John Tavares with the first-overall pick of the 2009 NHL entry draft. Tavares went into the draft as the top prospect in the majority of scouting reports, and it was widely expected that the Islanders would select him after they secured the first overall pick by winning the draft lottery, although there was plenty of competition between Tavares, Victor Hedman, and Matt Duchene. NHL Central Scouting Bureau's Chris Edwards spoke highly of him, stating, "[Tavares] is phenomenal at getting the puck through traffic to his linemates, getting to opening. The way he reads the play and can get to where he figures the rebounds will be and bangs in the rebound. He's a real smart player." They traded up twice in the first round to also select defenseman Calvin de Haan with the 12th overall pick, as well as Casey Cizikas and Anders Lee in later rounds, all of whom would go on to play consistently on the main roster by the 2014–15 season.

The 2009–10 season started out slow, with the team winless its first six games. The team continued to play inconsistently due to injuries as many wrote them off as potential postseason contenders. The team hit a mid-season hot streak, however nine losses in 11 games before the Olympic break set them right back. They ultimately ended up at bottom of the standings again, finishing the season 26th in the league. The placement led to a fifth overall pick in 2010. Continuing with their rebuilding process, they used the first round to draft young forwards Nino Niederreiter and Brock Nelson with picks five and 30, respectively. As the 2010–11 season got underway, the team quickly fell into a ten-game losing streak, leading to the firing of head coach Scott Gordon. He was replaced on an interim basis by Jack Capuano, who had been coaching the Bridgeport Sound Tigers. Early in the season, they also acquired Michael Grabner from waivers, who went on to score 34 goals and was selected as a finalist for the Calder Memorial Trophy; he would go on to sign a five-year contract with the team at the end of the season. This year also featured the infamous Penguins–Islanders brawl, which resulted in a combined 346 penalty minutes and a $100,000 fine to the Islanders for "failure to control their players".

The following season was a breakout year for Tavares. The newly named assistant captain gained 31 goals and 50 assists, in addition to being selected to play in the 59th NHL All-Star Game at the age of 21; his 81 points were seventh-best in the league. Tavares' left-winger Matt Moulson also had a strong season, finishing with career highs of 36 goals, 33 assists and 69 points. Despite strong seasons from their top players, the team finished 27th in the league with a record of 34–37–11, continuing their pattern of racking up top prospects with early picks at the drafts. They used the first round of the 2012 draft to select defenseman Griffin Reinhart with the fourth overall pick.

On August 1, 2011, voters in Nassau County rejected a proposal for a new arena to replace Nassau Coliseum. This followed the failed decade-long attempt by owner Charles Wang to build a mixed-use development called The Lighthouse Project, which would renovate the arena. In the wake of the vote, speculation began that the team would eventually move to Barclays Center in Brooklyn, new arenas in Queens or Suffolk County, the Sprint Center in Kansas City, or the Videotron Centre in Quebec City, the last of which is coincidentally set to open at the same time as the expiration of the Islanders' lease on the Nassau Coliseum in 2015.

On October 24, 2012, the Islanders made the announcement that the franchise will indeed be moving to the Barclays Center in Brooklyn for the 2015–16 NHL season, after signing a lease that would keep the team in the arena until 2040. The team retained its name, logo and colors as part of the move. As part of the deal, the management of the Barclays Center took over the team's business operations once the Islanders moved to the Barclays Center. The decision to move to Brooklyn didn't require the Rangers' approval. Under a longstanding provision of the agreement that allowed the Islanders to share the New York area with the Rangers, the Islanders are allowed to play their games anywhere on Long Island, including the two city boroughs on the island, Brooklyn and Queens.

Beginning on April 1, 2013, of the 2012–13 season, the team went on a near month-long unbeaten streak in regulation time, posting a 12-game streak of earning points until falling to the Philadelphia Flyers later that month. During that streak, on April 23, 2013, they clinched their first playoff berth since 2007 with a 4–3 shootout loss to the Carolina Hurricanes, ending a six-year playoff drought. Behind goaltender Evgeni Nabakov, the team was ultimately eliminated in six games by the Pittsburgh Penguins in the first round of the playoffs, continuing their winless streak in playoff series.

On September 10, 2013, Tavares was introduced as the 14th captain in New York Islanders history, replacing former Islander Mark Streit of the Philadelphia Flyers, who served as team captain since 2011. After posting a 4–4–3 record in their first 11 games, the Islanders made a trade, sending fan favorite and three-time 30-goal scorer Matt Moulson, their 2014 first-round draft pick and their 2015 second-round draft pick to the Buffalo Sabres in exchange for Thomas Vanek, a highly regarded and dynamic goal scorer. Despite chemistry with linemates Tavares and Kyle Okposo, however, the overall lack of on-ice success and his desire to test free agency led to Vanek being dealt to the Montreal Canadiens at the trade deadline for Sebastian Collberg and a second-round pick in 2014. After a season of player swapping and goaltending issues, they failed to qualify for the playoffs, finishing with a record of 34–37–11.

In the 2014 off-season, the Islanders made several moves to improve the team before their final season at Nassau Coliseum. In May, the Islanders acquired the rights to Jaroslav Halak from the Washington Capitals in exchange for a fourth-round pick in 2014. Halak was then signed to a four-year contract. The Islanders also signed Mikhail Grabovski, Nikolai Kulemin and goaltender Chad Johnson as free agents. Additionally, on October 4, the Islanders acquired Johnny Boychuk from the Boston Bruins for two-second-round picks in 2014 and 2015 and a conditional third-round pick in 2015, as well as Nick Leddy from the Chicago Blackhawks in exchange for prospect Ville Pokka, T. J. Brennan and the rights to Anders Nilsson.

The NHL Board of Governors approved the Islanders' sale to businessmen Jon Ledecky and Scott D. Malkin in October 2014. Ledecky and Malkin served as minority partners during a two-year transition period. At the end of the 2015–16 season, they formally took majority control from Wang, who will retain a share of the franchise.

The Islanders finished the 2014–15 regular season with a record of 47–28–7 for 101 points, and met the Washington Capitals in the first round of the 2015 playoffs. The Capitals held home ice advantage in the series after the Islanders lost their final regular season game to the Columbus Blue Jackets, 5–4, in a shootout, as the Islanders lost the season series to the Capitals after posting a 2–1–1 record in the season series. On April 19, 2015, in the third game of their first round series against Washington, John Tavares scored 15 seconds into overtime to win the game for the Islanders, 2–1. It was the second-shortest overtime playoff game in Islanders history, and was the first overtime, game-winning goal for the Islanders in the playoffs since 1993. The Islanders lost the fourth and fifth games of their series before rebounding in the sixth game to force a seventh game in the series. However, they were denied entry into the second round by a single goal and would ultimately fall to the Capitals in seven games. As a result, game six was the Islanders' last game at Nassau Veterans Memorial Coliseum; the Isles' Cal Clutterbuck scored the final NHL goal in the building.

== 2015–present: Barclays Center era, playoff success and move to UBS Arena ==
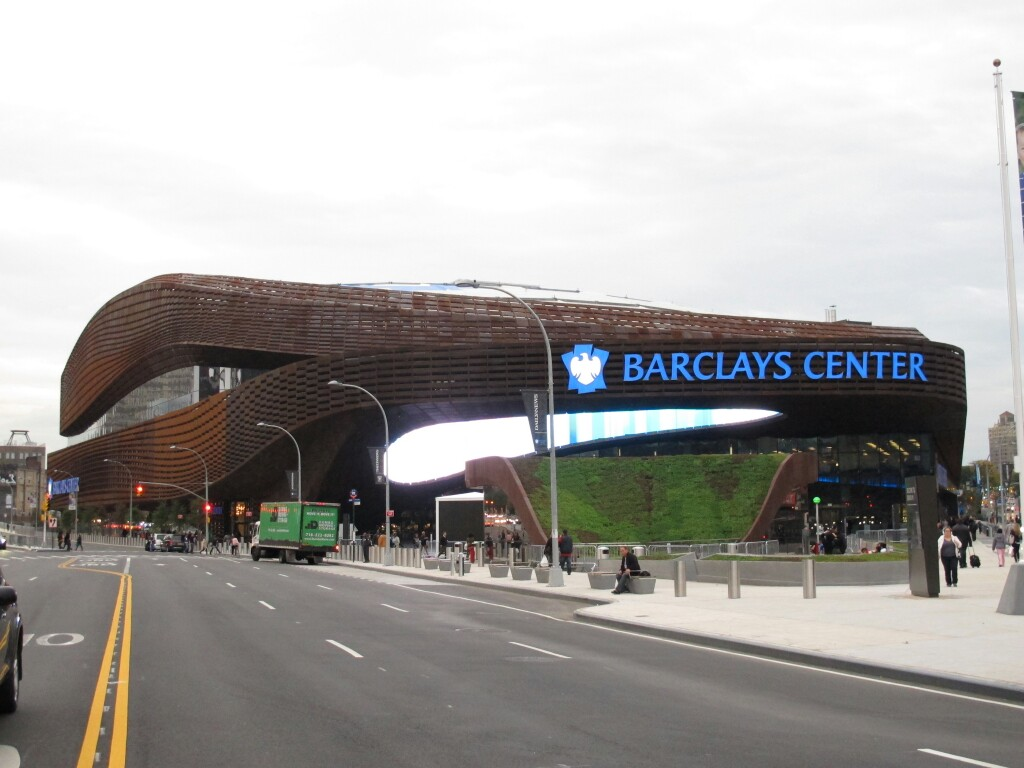
Barclays Center in Brooklyn, the home of the Islanders from 2015 to 2020

In June 2015, the Islanders selected forward Andong Song in the 6th round of the 2015 NHL entry draft, making him the first Chinese player to be drafted by an NHL team.

The Islanders played their first regular season game at Barclays Center on October 9, 2015, losing 3–2 in overtime to the Chicago Blackhawks. Artem Anisimov scored the first regular season goal, while Tavares scored the first regular season Islanders goal. The Islanders posted the fourth-best penalty kill rate and allowed the fewest power play goals during the season. However, in the last quarter of the regular season, some players, including Halak and defenseman Travis Hamonic, suffered key injuries. The team finished the regular season fourth in the Metropolitan Division with 100 points, enough to clinch the first wild card spot in the Eastern Conference. In the first round of the playoffs, they faced off against the Florida Panthers; goaltender Thomas Greiss only played in 40 minutes of playoff hockey with the San Jose Sharks prior to this series. Both teams split the first four games of the series. The fifth game of the series proved to be a major turning point, as late season call-up Alan Quine scored the game-winning goal on the power play with four minutes left in double overtime to end the second-longest game in franchise history; that goal gave them a 3–2 series lead and a chance to clinch the series on home ice. In the sixth game, the Islanders trailed 1–0 for much of the game, but Tavares tied it late in the third period. Tavares would score again with the series-clinching goal in double overtime to give the Islanders their first playoff series win since 1993. In the second round of the playoffs, they faced the Tampa Bay Lightning for the first time since 2004. Despite winning the first game of the series, the Islanders lost their series to the Lightning in five games.

Summer of 2016 saw free agents and longtime Islanders Kyle Okposo, Frans Nielsen, and Matt Martin all depart the team, joining the Buffalo Sabres, Detroit Red Wings, and Toronto Maple Leafs, respectively. Snow signed free agents Andrew Ladd from the Winnipeg Jets and Jason Chimera from the Washington Capitals to help fill the gaps left behind. After an underwhelming first half of the 2016–17 season, posting a 17–17–8 record through 42 games, head coach Jack Capuano was relieved of duties, with assistant general manager Doug Weight being named interim head coach. Having coached the team since 2010, Capuano was the second winningest coach in the team's history with 227 wins, also leading the team to their first playoff series win since 1993. Prior to Capuano's release, goaltender Jaroslav Halak was placed on waivers, and eventually sent down to the Bridgeport Sound Tigers. Having carried three goaltenders for the second consecutive season, the decision was made to stick with the tandem of Greiss and back-up Jean-Francois Berube after Halak posted a 6–8–5 record with a .904 save percentage through the beginning of the 2016–17 season.

In late January 2017, following a report by Bloomberg News which speculated that Barclays Center was considering removing the Islanders due to poor attendance and effects on the venue's profit margins (reception to Barclays Center as a hockey venue has been mixed, and the Islanders have had the third-worst average attendance in the entire league), Newsday reported that Nassau County executive Edward Mangano had met with one of the team's co-owners, and told the paper that it was possible that the Islanders could return to the renovated Nassau Coliseum.

Despite winning their last six games of the 2016–17 season, the Islanders finished in ninth place in the Eastern Conference; they missed the playoffs by only one point when the Toronto Maple Leafs clinched the final playoff spot on the penultimate day of the season.

In the 2018–2019 season, the Islanders hired Lou Lamoriello as their GM, Barry Trotz as their coach and named Anders Lee as their captain. They ended the season with 103 points (3 more than Toronto) and swept the Penguins in the first round of the playoffs (then swept by Hurricanes).

In the summer of 2019, the Islanders broke ground on UBS Arena, located on the property of Belmont Park, in Elmont, New York. The Islanders were due to begin play there at the start of the 2021-22 NHL season.

== Traditions ==
=== Paul Cartier ===
Paul Cartier, who is an organist for the New York Yankees Major League Baseball team, is also the organist for the Islanders, keeping the Islanders tradition alive at UBS Arena and previously at Nassau Coliseum and Barclays Center.

=== Fan Sections ===
The Blue and Orange Army are a fan section for the New York Islanders since 2009. They sit in section 329 at UBS Arena. They sat in sections 228 & 229 of the Barclays Center. When the team was at Nassau Coliseum, they sat in Section 329 just under the Islanders' four Stanley Cup banners.

=== Chants ===
Some fan chants that Islanders fans have been doing over the years include, "YES YES YES YES YES YES YES YES YES YES!", done each time after the Islanders score a goal. The YES chant was started by The Blue and Orange Army during the '13-'14 season and slowly grew to be a part of team history chanted by thousands of people. Another chant that the Islanders fans would do after the goal was scored was when a man yelled, "WHOO!", the fans would yell, "WHOO!" back.
