= Neil Hawryliw =

Canadian ice hockey player (1955–2021)

- Born: November 9, 1955 Fielding, Saskatchewan, Canada
- Died: October 3, 2021 (aged 65) Norton Shores, Michigan, U.S.
- Height: 5 ft 11 in (180 cm)
- Weight: 185 lb (84 kg; 13 st 3 lb)
- Position: Right wing
- Shot: Left
- Played for: New York Islanders
- NHL draft: Undrafted
- Playing career: 1976–1987

Neil A. Hawryliw (November 9, 1955 – October 3, 2021) was a Canadian professional ice hockey right winger who played in one National Hockey League (NHL) game for the New York Islanders during the 1981–82 NHL season.

Hawryliw signed with the Islanders in 1978 but, because the Islanders of the time were deep in talent, Hawryliw was largely confined to the Central Professional Hockey League and the International Hockey League (IHL).

After retiring from hockey, Hawryliw was director of the L.C. Walker Arena in Muskegon, Michigan. He married Joni Miller in 1982 and had one son, Nigel. Hawryliw died on October 3, 2021, in Norton Shores, Michigan.

== Career statistics ==
=== Regular season and playoffs ===
			Regular season					Playoffs
Season	Team	League	GP	G	A	Pts	PIM	GP	G	A	Pts	PIM
1972–73	Humboldt Broncos	SJHL	48	25	20	45	38	—	—	—	—	—
1973–74	Saskatoon Blades	WCHL	52	23	20	43	28	6	0	0	0	0
1974–75	Saskatoon Blades	WCHL	68	29	38	67	51	17	2	10	12	13
1975–76	Saskatoon Blades	WCHL	72	48	39	87	155	20	14	20	34	23
1976–77	Muskegon Mohawks	IHL	38	18	18	36	16	7	2	3	5	4
1977–78	Muskegon Mohawks	IHL	75	37	32	69	84	5	2	3	5	9
1978–79	Muskegon Mohawks	IHL	13	11	7	18	14	—	—	—	—	—
1978–79	Fort Worth Texans	CHL	57	9	15	24	87	—	—	—	—	—
1979–80	Indianapolis Checkers	CHL	70	26	19	45	56	7	4	2	6	6
1980–81	Indianapolis Checkers	CHL	80	37	42	79	61	5	0	2	2	7
1981–82	New York Islanders	NHL	1	0	0	0	0	—	—	—	—	—
1981–82	Indianapolis Checkers	CHL	58	20	14	34	89	13	3	11	14	6
1982–83	Muskegon Mohawks	IHL	68	33	24	57	42	4	0	1	1	4
1982–83	Wichita Wind	CHL	2	2	3	5	0	—	—	—	—	—
1983–84	Muskegon Mohawks	IHL	66	25	37	62	36	—	—	—	—	—
1984–85	Muskegon Lumberjacks	IHL	80	17	22	39	93	14	2	3	5	29
1985–86	Muskegon Lumberjacks	IHL	14	4	1	5	10	—	—	—	—	—
1985–86	Kalamazoo Wings	IHL	68	32	23	55	67	6	1	3	4	17
1986–87	Kalamazoo Wings	IHL	56	9	23	32	84	5	0	1	1	4
IHL totals			478	186	187	373	446	41	7	14	21	67
NHL totals			1	0	0	0	0	—	—	—	—	—

== See also ==
- List of players who played only one game in the NHL
