= John Pickett (businessman) =

American businessman (born 1934)

John Olen Pickett Jr. (born August 30, 1934) is an American businessman who was owner and board chairman of the New York Islanders of the National Hockey League during their dynasty period in the 1980s.

== Early life ==
John O. Pickett Jr. grew up in Texarkana, Texas, on a ranch owned by his parents, John Olen Pickett Sr. (1908–1971) and Anna Mae (Gill) Pickett (1911–1999), and later attended the University of Arkansas. Pickett moved to Long Island after earning his fortune as a private investor. He owned management-consultant firms in Chicago and Palm Beach and first became interested in hockey after attending New York Rangers games during business trips to New York during the late 1950s.

== Islanders ownership and dynasty years ==
John Pickett was a limited partner in the original Islanders' ownership group, headed by Roy Boe. He purchased a small share in the team for $100,000 in 1972 at the request of Boe, who was then a casual acquaintance. However, by 1978, the Islanders were sinking under the weight of serious financial problems, and Boe was forced to put them up for sale. No buyers turned up at first, however. Finally, general manager Bill Torrey engineered a sale to Pickett, a restructuring specialist, who rewarded him with the team presidency. Pickett restructured the team's finances with a view towards making them a viable long-term franchise on suburban Long Island.

Not long after closing on the Islanders' purchase, Pickett signed a very lucrative cable contract with the then-one-year-old SportsChannel New York (later Fox Sports New York and now MSG Plus). The deal not only ensured the Islanders would stay on Long Island, but gave Pickett a significant revenue stream which he used to sign the final pieces for a team that would go on to win four consecutive Stanley Cups in 1980, 1981, 1982, and 1983. Pickett attempted to sell Charles Dolan a 36 percent share in the Islanders in 1981, but the sale was blocked by a lawsuit from four minority owners who accused Pickett of undervaluing the team and trying to sell their shares without their consent. Believing the lawsuit to be a distraction from the team's performance on the ice, Pickett cancelled the deal.

During the Islanders' dynasty years, the team was a model franchise in professional sports, emulated for its formula of supportive ownership and building through the draft. During its championship years under Pickett, the team was the highest paying professional organization in ice hockey, with stars like Bryan Trottier, Mike Bossy, Denis Potvin and Billy Smith at or near the top of the league in compensation by position. During this period, Pickett was a very hands-off owner who shied away from media attention, instead permitting accolades to be showered on the players and coaches. He largely left the Islanders in Torrey's hands and rarely interfered. All the while, Pickett was one of the most influential owners in the National Hockey League during this period, driving NHL policy along with League President John A. Ziegler Jr.

== Decline and aborted sales ==
In 1985, after signing a new lease that would keep the Islanders in Nassau Coliseum for another 30 years, Pickett moved to Florida to focus on other business interests and severely reduced his involvement in the team's daily operations. During the second half of the 1980s, despite significant revenue from their long-term Cablevision contract, the team's strategy of building through the draft began to yield less success on the ice. Additionally, Pickett was accused of keeping a majority of the $12 million in annual revenue from the cable deal, rather than reinvesting it in the team. Despite superstars like Pat LaFontaine, the team suffered from a series of unsuccessful draft picks, and performance declined. The bottom fell out in 1988-89, when the Islanders tied for the worst record in the league and missed the playoffs altogether for the first time in 15 years.

The Islanders continued to struggle, and Pickett's ownership and budgeting of the team came under fire in early 1991 when star player Pat LaFontaine asked to be traded after negotiations on a team-initiated contract extension collapsed. LaFontaine eventually refused to negotiate with general manager Bill Torrey and demanded the removal of Pickett as owner. Pickett initially declared his allegiance to the Islanders, but by late February he had officially put the team up for sale and indicated his desire to obtain an NHL expansion franchise closer to his home in Florida. He had hoped to sell the Islanders quickly, but by the beginning of the 1991-92 season they still had not been sold. LaFontaine, who refused to report to the team, was joined in his request for a trade by team captain Brent Sutter, and both would be traded away by Torrey in separate deals shortly after the start of the season.

In December 1991, aware of the limitations of his absentee ownership but still unable to find an outright buyer willing to pay his $75 million price tag, Pickett attempted to re-establish local management of the Islanders by selling a minority stake in the team to a committee of four Long Island entrepreneurs – Ralph Palleschi, Bob Rosenthal, Stephen Walsh and Paul Greenwood. As part of the sale, Pickett gave them operating control of the team. The group was deeply rooted in the Long Island business environment, and it was hoped that their involvement would be an alternative to Pickett selling the team outright.

On August 18, 1992, it was announced that Cablevision chairman Charles Dolan, who had first attempted to acquire an interest in the Islanders over ten years earlier, had reached an agreement to purchase the team from John Pickett. However, the two sides were never able to complete the sale and a year later the deal expired, with Pickett retaining majority control of the team. The "Gang of Four" minority owners continued to run the team, but after missing the playoffs five times in seven years, and with the committee making deeply unpopular decisions such as a change of logo, Pickett finally wanted out for good. He again put the team up for sale in 1996, and appointed his son Brett Pickett to oversee the sale and operation of the franchise.

Pickett thought he found a buyer in John Spano, a Dallas leasing agent seemingly flush with cash. With league commissioner Gary Bettman brokering the deal, Pickett reached an agreement to sell the team to Spano in October 1996. However, in June 1997, after Spano missed several payments on his purchase contract, Bettman ordered him to relinquish day-to-day control of the team to Pickett until the dispute was resolved. A month later, Newsday started investigating Spano after several Islanders executives alerted the paper that something was amiss about their new boss. That investigation led to a story that revealed Spano had lied to Pickett and the NHL about his net worth and resources to complete the transaction, and also had two lawsuits pending against him. Within days of that story running, Spano relinquished the team to Pickett.

A federal investigation revealed that Spano had forged many of the documents he had used to vouch for his wealth and promise payment to Pickett, and had even been brazen enough to fax many of these forged documents from his own office. Spano was ultimately sentenced to 71 months in prison for bank and wire fraud.

== Sale to Gluckstern group ==
Following the Spano fraud, and after several years of trying to find a buyer, Pickett finally sold the Islanders to a group headed by Phoenix Coyotes co-owner Steven Gluckstern and New York City real estate developer Howard Millstein in September 1997. Having thought to have found an ownership team committed to the team's future on Long Island, Pickett fully retired quietly to Florida. As it turned out, the Islanders would be sold again in 2000.

Sporting positions
Preceded by Roy Boe	New York Islanders owner 1978–1997	Succeeded by John Spano
