= John Spano =

American businessman and fraudster

John A. Spano, Jr.
- Born: John Angelo Spano Jr. May 31, 1964 (age 62); New York City, New York, U.S.
- Occupations: Businessman, former owner of Bison Group and Commercial Financial Group
- Status: Imprisoned, June 2015
- Conviction: Pleaded guilty
- Criminal charges: 1997: Various charges of bank fraud, wire fraud, and forgery in New York, Massachusetts, and Texas, including fraud to gain control of the New York Islanders; 2005: Mail fraud charges in Ohio; 2014: Theft and forgery charges in Ohio
- Penalty: 1999: 71 months in prison; 2006: 51 months in prison; 2015: 10 years in prison; Combined $12.193 million in fines and restitution

John Angelo Spano Jr. (born May 31, 1964) is an American businessman and convicted fraudster. He is best known for briefly buying control of the New York Islanders franchise of the National Hockey League (NHL) in 1996, before it emerged that he barely owned a fraction of the assets that he claimed to own. He deceived several banks into lending him enough money to initiate the purchase, believing he could use the fraudulently purchased team itself as an asset to get the remaining tens of millions of dollars needed to cover his fraud. He subsequently pleaded guilty to bank and wire fraud and served a federal prison sentence. Spano was convicted of 16 counts of forgery in Ohio in 2015 and served his sentence in Grafton Correctional Institution; he was released in November 2024.

== Early life ==
Spano was born in New York City but spent most of his life in Madison, Ohio, and graduated from Ashtabula St. John High School. While at St. John he was a classmate and a high school football teammate of Urban Meyer. He graduated from Duquesne University with a degree in business administration in 1986. After working several sales jobs in Pittsburgh and Dallas, he founded the Bison Group in 1990, a Dallas-based company that primarily leased aircraft. Years later, he recalled that moving in the same circles with people twice his age made him want to aim higher, and set his sights on being a sports team owner. Having frequently watched Pittsburgh Penguins games during his college days, he came to love hockey, and decided to try to buy an NHL team.

== Interest in Dallas Stars ==
In September 1995, with several of his friends in Dallas-area country clubs vouching for him, he began talks to buy the Dallas Stars, claiming to be worth over $100 million based on a letter purportedly from his bankers. Years later, Jim Lites, the Stars' president at the time, recalled that he and his fellow executives took Spano's offer seriously because Spano was close to Dallas Cowboys great Roger Staubach.

Spano reached a tentative agreement to buy a 50 percent stake in the team, but the date for the closing was pushed back several times, during which Spano began making what owner Norman Green called unreasonable demands. Green backed out of the deal in November, eventually selling the team to Tom Hicks. Lites later recalled visiting Spano's mansion in the Dallas suburb of University Park. Despite Spano's claimed wealth, Lites said the house was unfurnished. Among the "laughable" excuses Spano offered were that he needed a copy of a written agreement with the team's top minor league affiliate, the Kalamazoo Wings and to have his South African partners meet with Stars officials. Lites also said that Spano insisted that Lites pick up the tab for their dinners—something Lites said he had never seen in all of his years as a sports executive.

Spano also made a bid for the Florida Panthers that year after his Stars bid failed, which he abandoned after then-Panthers owner Wayne Huizenga got a deal for a new arena and opted not to sell. Despite his failures to purchase both teams, Spano began to attract the attention of NHL commissioner Gary Bettman, who stated in an April 1997 interview that Spano was "the type of person we want as an owner." Bettman later recanted the remark after Spano's exposure.

== Purchase of New York Islanders ==
During his bid for the Panthers, Spano befriended former New York Islanders captain Denis Potvin, who suggested Spano consider buying the Islanders. Bettman also suggested he sit down with longtime Islanders owner John Pickett, figuring that a New York native with a seeming passion for hockey would be a good fit for the team.

On October 10, 1996, Spano agreed to buy the Islanders from Pickett for $165 million: $80 million for Pickett's 90 percent stake in the team and $85 million for its lucrative cable television contract with SportsChannel New York, which at the time earned the Islanders $13 million a year. He later agreed to buy the remaining 10 percent of the team held by the management group that had been running the Islanders' day-to-day operations since 1989.

Spano billed himself as the owner of a leasing operation that he had built from one company with four employees to a group of 10 companies with 6,000 employees worldwide in a period of just six years. He claimed to be worth $230 million, most of which he attributed to have been inherited from his wealthy grandfather Angelo; he also claimed to own his $3 million University Park house free and clear.

Pickett and Bettman were initially confident about Spano, believing he would give the once-proud franchise a shot in the arm. The Islanders had fallen on hard times after their four consecutive Stanley Cup championships, having missed the playoffs in five of the previous eight years. The previous season had seen them finish with the third-worst record in the league. Furthermore, the team was suffering at the gate, and rumors abounded that they were about to move to Atlanta, Nashville or Houston. Spano committed to keeping the team on Long Island and either renovate, rebuild or replace the aging Nassau Coliseum.

He paid for the team at signing with a loan from a syndicate of banks headed by Fleet Bank; years later, he recalled that he had a harder time financing his first car, which cost only $12,000. He and Pickett agreed to a five-year installment package for the cable rights, and the league's other owners approved the sale in February 1997.

Spano was initially hailed as a hero by both fans and players, having made it clear that he intended to make the team a Stanley Cup contender. On Halloween night, while the Islanders were playing the Toronto Maple Leafs at Nassau Coliseum, the fans chanted, "Save us, Spano!" As his jersey was being retired in December, Clark Gillies, one of the stars of the dynasty years, mentioned the pending sale to Spano in his speech to the fans while Spano was watching from the owner's box. He quickly ingratiated himself with the players, coming to the locker room after games. Former Islanders player Bryan Berard said that the players appreciated that they had an owner who seemingly cared about them. The team went on a hot streak in early 1997, and were within striking distance of a playoff berth for a time. He frequently spent time at the nightclub of the Garden City Hotel.

However, some Islanders executives were skeptical of him. One of them, co-chairman Bob Rosenthal, a member of the four-man management group, recalled years later that no one knew how Spano had made his money. When Spano balked at making a $5 million down payment, Rosenthal urged Pickett to call off the deal, but Pickett was satisfied by the documents that appeared to attest to Spano's wealth and let the deal go forward.

Spano had taken day-to-day control of the team in October, but the first $16.5 million payment on the cable rights was due on April 7. Longtime Islanders general counsel William Skehan speculated that Spano was banking on the Islanders getting "a major loan" from Cablevision, owner of SportsChannel New York, which would have been more than enough for him to pay for the cable rights. When that fell through, Spano then set about negotiating to build a new arena, but talks were still underway when the closing date approached.

When the money wasn't there on April 7, However, Spano promised Pickett the money would be wired out, showing him a letter from Lloyds Bank in London as proof. He also claimed to need more time to unwind some complex financial matters. While the Islanders' lawyers were reluctant to close, Pickett was satisfied and he closed the deal. Ahead of the deal's closure, Spano had already pumped $2.5 million into the team's payroll and forced head coach/general manager Mike Milbury to cede the head coaching position to Rick Bowness (though Milbury claimed it was his decision). He also let it be known that he intended to be a major player in the free-agent market that summer.

=== Revealed as a swindler ===
When the NHL's Board of Governors met in June 1997, Spano was not present. Instead, the Islanders were represented by two men from the Pickett regime. Upon further investigation, it emerged that Spano had only paid a total of $26,200 to Pickett for the cable rights after five attempts. On the first attempt, he sent $1,700 when he was supposed to send $17 million. On another attempt, he'd wired Pickett only $5,000 instead of the $5 million originally agreed upon. Spano frequently claimed that mistakes by his lawyers and accountants were causing the delays. On one occasion, he claimed a Provisional Irish Republican Army bombing had ground London to a halt just as his courier was about to leave with the money. Pickett finally lost patience with Spano's stalling and asked Bettman to intervene. At the request of Pickett, Bettman ordered Spano to remove himself from day-to-day control of the Islanders and not use any team assets until the dispute could be settled. Spano had little choice to accept; negotiations for a new arena had bogged down in Nassau County's bureaucracy.

In early July, Newsday, acting on tips from anonymous Islanders executives that their new boss was worth significantly less than advertised, began investigating Spano's background. According to Islanders beat reporter John Valenti, an anonymous Islanders official dropped off a box containing a tranche of documents relating to Spano transactions at the paper's office. Over the next week, a series of stories in Newsday exposed Spano as a complete fraud who was not worth even a fraction of the money required to complete the Islanders deal. Among other things, the Newsday investigation revealed:

- He had grossly misrepresented his net worth; he was worth only $5 million.
- His Bison Group had 22 employees and assets of $3 million.
- He had lied about numerous items on his résumé. For instance, he had claimed to have graduated from an exclusive prep school in Ohio, but had actually graduated from a small Catholic school in Ashtabula.
- His "inherited wealth" did not exist; neither of his grandfathers had an estate valued at more than $246,000.

Even as the investigation was underway, Spano was in talks with Garden City Hotel owner Myron Melkin, who was willing to bail Spano out in return for controlling interest in the Islanders. However, when Newsday's final story ran on July 6, Melkin walked away. Realizing he was at the end of his tether, Spano relinquished control of the Islanders back to Pickett on July 11. Under the terms of a mediation brokered by Bettman, Pickett agreed not to sue Spano for breach of contract. Spano theoretically could have taken the team into Chapter 11 bankruptcy, but said he had too much respect for the team and fans to do so. Pickett subsequently reached an agreement with Fleet to repay the loan Spano used to buy the team itself.

Spano later told Sports Illustrated that a "significant" capital call and a payment on a note blew apart his plans to pay Pickett. However, he claimed that once Pickett asked Bettman to intervene and the story broke in the press, it was impossible for him to resolve the dispute. It also emerged that Spano owed $85,000 in back property taxes on his home.

There had been some questions about Spano even before the Islanders deal came unraveled. The other NHL owners were reportedly wary of Spano well before his purchase of the team was approved. Then-New Jersey Devils owner John McMullen, for instance, told Stan Fischler (a longtime television analyst for SportsChannel New York, which owned and still owns the Islanders' TV rights under the name MSG Sportsnet) that he was unsure if Spano was even using his own money to buy the team. Fischler also learned that Spano had promised Tom Croke, the leader of an Islanders fan club, a post as his "special advisor," but had not informed anyone within the Islanders organization about it. Spano had also offered the team presidency to Potvin, who had never gotten along with Milbury and planned to fire him altogether, but negotiations collapsed after Spano apparently told Potvin that he was running out of money. Potvin later said that Spano had almost no staff, which was unusual for a multimillionaire.

Not long after Spano's cover was blown, it emerged that Spano was also being sued by South African cookware maker Lenco Holdings. Spano had reached a deal with Lenco to sell its pots and pans to American buyers at Nordstrom; however, Nordstrom had never sold cookware, and the department code on the purported Nordstrom purchase order was for women's coats. Spano borrowed against the venture to secure a $1 million loan from Comerica. He was also being sued by a Dallas law firm after it was revealed that he had not paid them for legal work during his abortive run at the Stars. Had either of these suits come to light sooner, it is likely that Spano's pursuit of the Islanders would have been over before it started.

=== Arrest and incarceration ===
In the course of its reporting, Newsday revealed that a federal investigation into Spano's affairs was well underway. Pickett had alerted the United States Attorney for the Eastern District of New York at the same time he alerted the NHL. On July 23, federal prosecutors on Long Island charged Spano with multiple counts of bank fraud, wire fraud and forgery. On August 14, federal prosecutors in Fort Worth indicted Spano on additional unrelated charges of bank fraud and wire fraud for bilking two lenders out of $5.1 million. Soon afterward, federal prosecutors in Boston (home to Fleet) began investigating Spano regarding the $80 million loan.

Prosecutors obtained evidence that Spano had forged numerous letters from bank officials in his business dealings from 1995 onward. After Spano bounced the $17 million check, Comerica reportedly sent a letter to Pickett's attorneys saying he had funds to cover the overdraft. However, the executive who purportedly signed it denied ever writing it. Moreover, the letter was written in two different fonts, one on the body and another on the signature block. A postal inspector found that the fax machine mark at the top of the page was an exact match to the one used by Spano's Bison Group. The fax machine mark on a letter purportedly from Donaldson, Lufkin & Jenrette that claimed Spano owned Treasury bills worth $27 million was also an exact match to the one used by Bison Group.

It also emerged that many of the banks who gave money to Spano had abandoned their traditional safeguards. Fleet had relied on a letter from a Comerica senior vice president saying that Spano was worth over $100 million. This figure was based on what were later described as "unverified documents" provided by Spano. Additionally, a Dallas attorney claimed as trustee of a $107 million trust later told prosecutors he was unable to verify the trust's existence because of Spano's reluctance to document the funds. The Fleet loan officer who approved the $80 million deal was forced to resign.

Spano initially fled to the Cayman Islands, but eventually agreed to return to the United States. At a court appearance, he admitted he was all but broke and could not post his $3 million bond; he had to use his house and those of his parents and sister as collateral. On October 8, he pleaded guilty to the charges lodged by prosecutors on Long Island and Texas. He admitted that he had planned to defraud the Islanders and Pickett. He also admitted billing the Islanders for luxury hotels and chartered jets and to forging documents.

The plea deal called for him to plead guilty to bank fraud charges in Boston a week later, but several deadlines came and went, and Spano began making noises in late November about withdrawing his plea. As a result, a Boston grand jury indicted him for bank fraud, and federal prosecutors there made plans to file a superseding indictment that could have sent him to prison for 60 years. However, Spano's new attorneys resigned due to concerns that they would not be paid, and Spano had no choice but to accept the original offer. He pleaded guilty to bank fraud on January 13, 1998.

In 1999, his wife divorced him and sold their house, and he moved to a Philadelphia condo where he had tried to pay the rent with an expired credit card, $10,000 in bad checks and wire transfers. This led to his arrest in February, and he lost his bail.

On January 28, 2000, he was sentenced to 71 months in federal prison and ordered to pay restitution of $11.9 million to his victims, including the Islanders ($3.4 million), two Dallas businesses ($4.4 million), and Mario Lemieux ($1.25 million).

=== Aftermath ===
Spano was released in June 2004 on five years' supervised release and moved to a Cleveland suburb. However, he was arrested again in February 2005 for defrauding numerous companies by promising to obtain loans for them and pocketing the fees without getting the loans. He was jailed for 51 months and released from prison on April 3, 2009.

On August 20, 2014, Spano was indicted by a grand jury in Ohio on one count of theft and 44 counts of forgery. In a scheme that took place from June 2011 until July 2013, Spano stole from his employers Image First, which rents linens to outpatient facilities in Ohio, and its sister company London Cleaners. He pleaded guilty to charges of collecting almost $70,000 in commissions on fraudulent accounts in May 2015 and was sentenced to 10 years prison on June 17, 2015. He was also ordered to pay more than $75,000 in restitution to Image First. After serving his sentence, he was released in November 2024.

== Legacy ==
The Spano fiasco was highly embarrassing to the NHL, which was still reeling from revelations that former NHLPA head Alan Eagleson had lied to his clients and enriched himself by skimming off the union's pension fund. The NHL was particularly shaken after it was revealed that it spent well under $1,000 evaluating Spano's credentials (estimates range from $525 to $750); most leagues spend well over $30,000 to evaluate prospective team owners. Prospective NHL owners are now vetted by Ernst and Young and a New York City accounting firm.

According to Spano, the NHL's due diligence consisted of little more than a league official simply by asking Spano's lawyer what his net worth was, and the lawyer confirming it solely based on Spano's word. Skehan claimed that when he and other team officials reviewed Spano's documents, they assumed the league had vetted him. Lites claimed that no one from the NHL called him or anyone from the Stars about their dealings with Spano. Bettman claimed that while the league had "circuit breakers" in place, Spano managed to avoid "tripping" them during his courting of the Islanders. When Spano bid for the Stars, the team was satisfied by a letter supposedly from Comerica attesting to his net worth.

Despite additional safeguards, the NHL had two additional fraudsters take advantage of the league in the following years: first, John Rigas purchased the Buffalo Sabres in 1997, only to have the league take over the franchise after his 2002 arrest for fraud. Second, in 2007, the Nashville Predators were sold to a group that included a nearly 30% share to William "Boots" Del Biaggio III, who was later revealed to have fraudulently obtained $110 million in loans from two NHL owners and eight banks in order to purchase a stake in the Predators, a crime for which he was sentenced to eight years in prison on September 8, 2009 and ordered to sell his share of the team.

After several attempts at interviews and possible documentaries, an ESPN 30 for 30 film, Big Shot, directed by actor and Long Island native Kevin Connolly, related John Spano's time as prospective owner of the New York Islanders and Spano himself appeared in the film to explain his actions. Spano said he was able to get in a position to be able to buy the Islanders by having access to "credit facilities" he normally wouldn't have been able to access. While the Islanders deal was being hammered out, he said, he went to great lengths to keep his accountants, lawyers, and NHL officials from communicating with each other, saying they would have "realized something wasn't right" if they ever talked to each other. He also said that as time went on, he grew increasingly nervous about the excuses he would have to offer in order to buy more time. The film was screened as part of the Sports portion of the 2013 TriBeCa Film Festival. The film subsequently premiered on television in October 2013.
