= Roy Boe =

American sports executive

- Born: Roy Lars Magnus Boe; September 14, 1929; Brooklyn, New York, U.S.
- Died: June 7, 2009 (aged 79); Bridgeport, Connecticut, U.S.
- Education: Yale University
- Occupation: Businessman
- Known for: Owner of the New York / New Jersey Nets, founder of the New York Islanders
- Children: 6

Roy Lars Magnus Boe (September 14, 1929 – June 7, 2009) was an American businessman and sports executive. He was the founding owner of the New York Islanders, and also owned the New York Nets and several other professional sports teams. He won two ABA championships as owner of the Nets and hired Bill Torrey as general manager of the newly created Islanders in 1972. He sold the Nets in 1978 shortly after moving the team to New Jersey and sold the Islanders that same year.

== Early life ==
Boe was a graduate of Yale University and a veteran of the Korean War. With his first wife, Deon Woolfolk, he founded a successful women's clothing company called Boe Jests, and sold it for several million dollars in 1966. His first sports purchase was the Westchester Bulls of the Atlantic Coast Football League, who played in the league until they moved in 1968.

== Professional ownership ==
In 1969, Boe purchased the New York Nets of the American Basketball Association. During his tenure with the Nets, the team reached the ABA Finals in 1972, 1974, and 1976, winning the latter two championships. After the last championship, Boe oversaw the Nets' entry into the National Basketball Association as part of the ABA–NBA merger. However, the New York Knicks demanded that the Nets pay them $4.8 million as compensation for "invading" the New York area. This was on top of the $3.2 million the Nets had to pay for joining the league. Boe offered to trade Julius Erving to the Knicks in return for waiving the indemnity and also approached the Los Angeles Lakers, Milwaukee Bucks, and Philadelphia 76ers about Erving's services. With Erving demanding a reworked contract, Boe was forced to sell Erving to the Sixers—in essence, trading his franchise player for a berth in the NBA, a move for which he was harshly criticized. Boe moved the team to New Jersey before the 1977–78 season, and sold the team in 1978.

In 1972, Boe helped found the New York Islanders of the National Hockey League. He owned twenty percent of the team. With a lack of hockey knowledge, Boe took advice on who to hire to run the team. On the advice of broadcaster Tim Ryan and publishing magnate Nelson Doubleday Jr. (who each worked with the Oakland Seals), Boe hired Bill Torrey as general manager. Shortly after Boe sold the team to John O. Pickett in 1978, Torrey led the Islanders to four consecutive Stanley Cup victories.

== Later years ==
In his later years, Boe owned the Worcester IceCats and Bridgeport Sound Tigers of the American Hockey League. He died of heart failure on June 7, 2009, and was survived by his wife, Betty Broderick, five children, and six grandchildren.
