= 1993–94 Pittsburgh Penguins season =

NHL team season

1993–94 Pittsburgh Penguins
- Northeast Division champions
- Division: 1st Northeast
- Conference: 2nd Eastern
- 1993–94 record: 44–27–13
- Home record: 25–9–8
- Road record: 19–18–5
- Goals for: 299
- Goals against: 285

Team information
- General manager: Craig Patrick
- Coach: Eddie Johnston
- Captain: Mario Lemieux
- Alternate captains: Ron Francis; Kevin Stevens; Bryan Trottier
- Arena: Pittsburgh Civic Arena
- Minor league affiliates: Cleveland Lumberjacks; Louisville Icehawks

Team leaders
- Goals: Kevin Stevens (41)
- Assists: Jaromir Jagr (67)
- Points: Jaromir Jagr (99)
- Penalty minutes: Ulf Samuelsson (199)
- Plus/minus: Martin Straka (+24)
- Wins: Tom Barrasso (22)
- Goals against average: Tom Barrasso (3.36)

The 1993–94 Pittsburgh Penguins season was the Penguins' 27th season in the National Hockey League (NHL).

== Regular season ==
The Penguins moved into the newly formed Northeast Division (competing against the teams that made up the old Adams Division) and won their third division crown in four seasons. This season marked the return to the Penguins and to the bench of head coach Eddie Johnston. Under EJ's guidance the Pens racked up a 101-point season, their second straight 100 point season and second in franchise history. The Northeast Division title earned them a second seed and a first round playoff date with the Washington Capitals. The Caps won the series in six games, which until 2018 was the only series victory that the Capitals had earned over the rival Penguins.

Of note from the season:

- The Penguins were not shut out in any of their 84 regular-season games.
- Injuries limited Mario Lemieux to only 22 regular season games.
- Rookie Markus Naslund made his NHL debut. Other rookies debuting for the Penguins were Chris Tamer, Greg Andrusak, Ed Patterson, Pat Neaton, Rob Dopson, Justin Duberman, and Ladislav Karabin.
- Each team during the 1993-1994 season played two neutral site games. The Penguins played, and won, in Sacramento vs Buffalo and in Cleveland vs. Boston on Easter Sunday.
- An offseason trade landed the Penguins Marty McSorley in exchange for Shawn McEachern. On February 16, the Pens and Kings made another trade, with McSorley and McEachern again involved: the Pens traded McSorley and Jim Paek to LA for Tomas Sandstrom and McEachern.
- Other trades: Paul Stanton to Boston for 3rd round pick 1994; Jeff Daniels to Florida for Greg Hawgood; Mike Needham to Dallas for Jim McKenzie
- RW Martin Straka had his first ever 30 goal season.
- Center Bryan Trottier unretired for one season and acted in a player/coach role, playing 41 games for the team as officially part of their coaching staff.
- Goaltender Roberto Romano made his return to the Penguins (and to the NHL) after toiling in Italy since the 1987-1988 season. Romano went 1-0-1 in his two appearances for the Penguins, his last games in the NHL.
- On November 16, 1993, the Penguins defeated the Flyers, 11-5. This would be the last time the Penguins scored 11 goals in a game for 29 years.

=== Season standings ===
Northeast Division
No.	CR		GP	W	L	T	GF	GA	Pts
1	2	**Pittsburgh Penguins**	84	44	27	13	299	285	101
2	4	**Boston Bruins**	84	42	29	13	289	252	97
3	5	**Montreal Canadiens**	84	41	29	14	283	248	96
4	6	**Buffalo Sabres**	84	43	32	9	282	218	95
5	11	Quebec Nordiques	84	34	42	8	277	292	76
6	13	Hartford Whalers	84	27	48	9	227	288	63
7	14	Ottawa Senators	84	14	61	9	201	397	37

Note: No. = Division rank, CR = Conference rank, W = Wins, L = Losses, T = Ties, GF = Goals For, GA = Goals Against, Pts = Points
Teams that qualified for the playoffs are highlighted in bold.

Eastern Conference
R		GP	W	L	T	GF	GA	Pts
**1**	**p-New York Rangers ***	**84**	**52**	**24**	**8**	**299**	**231**	**112**
**2**	**x-Pittsburgh Penguins ***	**84**	**44**	**27**	**13**	**299**	**285**	**101**
**3**	**New Jersey Devils**	**84**	**47**	**25**	**12**	**306**	**220**	**106**
**4**	**Boston Bruins**	**84**	**42**	**29**	**13**	**289**	**252**	**97**
**5**	**Montreal Canadiens**	**84**	**41**	**29**	**14**	**283**	**248**	**96**
**6**	**Buffalo Sabres**	**84**	**43**	**32**	**9**	**282**	**218**	**95**
**7**	**Washington Capitals**	**84**	**39**	**35**	**10**	**277**	**263**	**88**
**8**	**New York Islanders**	**84**	**36**	**36**	**12**	**282**	**264**	**84**
9	Florida Panthers	84	33	34	17	233	233	83
10	Philadelphia Flyers	84	35	39	10	294	314	80
11	Quebec Nordiques	84	34	42	8	277	292	76
12	Tampa Bay Lightning	84	30	43	11	224	251	71
13	Hartford Whalers	84	27	48	9	227	288	63
14	Ottawa Senators	84	14	61	9	201	397	37

Final standings

bold – Qualified for playoffs; x – Won division; p – Won Presidents' Trophy (and division); * – Division leader

== Schedule and results ==
=== Regular season ===
1993–94 regular season
October: 7–4–1 (home: 4–1–1; road: 3–3–0), 15 Points

#	Oct	Visitor	Score	Home	Record	Points	Recap
1	5	Pittsburgh Penguins	3–4	Philadelphia Flyers	0–1–0	0	L
2	7	Montreal Canadiens	1–2 OT	Pittsburgh Penguins	1–1–0	2	W
3	9	New York Rangers	2–3	Pittsburgh Penguins	2–1–0	4	W
4	10	Pittsburgh Penguins	4–7	Quebec Nordiques	2–2–0	4	L
5	12	Pittsburgh Penguins	2–1	Florida Panthers	3–2–0	6	W
6	14	Pittsburgh Penguins	2–3	Tampa Bay Lightning	3–3–0	6	L
7	16	Hartford Whalers	3–5	Pittsburgh Penguins	4–3–0	8	W
8	19	Pittsburgh Penguins	3–2	New York Islanders	5–3–0	10	W
9	22	Pittsburgh Penguins	4–2	Buffalo Sabres	6–3–0	12	W
10	23	St. Louis Blues	3–3 OT	Pittsburgh Penguins	6–3–1	13	T
11	28	Quebec Nordiques	7–3	Pittsburgh Penguins	6–4–1	13	L
12	30	Chicago Blackhawks	3–4	Pittsburgh Penguins	7–4–1	15	W

November: 2–3–5 (home: 3–1–1; road: 2–2–4), 15 Points

#	Nov	Visitor	Score	Home	Record	Points	Recap
13	2	Pittsburgh Penguins	3–3 OT	San Jose Sharks	7–4–2	16	T
14	3	Pittsburgh Penguins	6–2	Buffalo Sabres	8–4–2	18	W
15	6	Pittsburgh Penguins	3–8	Los Angeles Kings	8–5–2	18	L
16	7	Pittsburgh Penguins	5–4	Mighty Ducks of Anaheim	9–5–2	20	W
17	9	Pittsburgh Penguins	3–3 OT	St. Louis Blues	9–5–3	21	T
18	11	Pittsburgh Penguins	1–4	Chicago Blackhawks	9–6–3	21	L
19	13	Detroit Red Wings	7–3	Pittsburgh Penguins	9–7–3	21	L
20	16	Philadelphia Flyers	5–11	Pittsburgh Penguins	10–7–3	23	W
21	18	Washington Capitals	2–3	Pittsburgh Penguins	11–7–3	25	W
22	20	Pittsburgh Penguins	2–2 OT	Montreal Canadiens	11–7–4	26	T
23	24	Boston Bruins	3–7	Pittsburgh Penguins	12–7–4	28	W
24	26	Pittsburgh Penguins	4–4 OT	Washington Capitals	12–7–5	29	T
25	27	Ottawa Senators	2–2 OT	Pittsburgh Penguins	12–7–6	30	T

December: 6–4–2 (home: 3–2–2; road: 3–2–0), 14 Points

#	Dec	Visitor	Score	Home	Record	Points	Recap
26	2	New Jersey Devils	2–2 OT	Pittsburgh Penguins	12–7–7	31	T
27	4	Pittsburgh Penguins	7–6 OT	Hartford Whalers	13–7–7	33	W
28	8	Pittsburgh Penguins	2–3	Dallas Stars	13–8–7	33	L
29	11	Pittsburgh Penguins	6–3	Tampa Bay Lightning	14–8–7	35	W
30	14	Los Angeles Kings	2–4	Pittsburgh Penguins	15–8–7	37	W
31	16	Buffalo Sabres	1–2	Pittsburgh Penguins	16–8–7	39	W
32	19	New York Islanders	6–3	Pittsburgh Penguins	16–9–7	39	L
33	21	Tampa Bay Lightning	3–8	Pittsburgh Penguins	17–9–7	41	W
34	23	Pittsburgh Penguins	4–3	Boston Bruins	18–9–7	43	W
35	26	Pittsburgh Penguins	3–7	Washington Capitals	18–10–7	43	L
36	28	Philadelphia Flyers	4–4 OT	Pittsburgh Penguins	18–10–8	44	T
37	31	Quebec Nordiques	5–4	Pittsburgh Penguins	18–11–8	44	L

January: 6–3–3 (home: 4–0–2; road: 2–3–1), 15 Points

#	Jan	Visitor	Score	Home	Record	Points	Recap
38	2	Pittsburgh Penguins	2–7	Hartford Whalers	18–12–8	44	L
39	3	Pittsburgh Penguins	4–1	Ottawa Senators	19–12–8	46	W
40	7	Pittsburgh Penguins	4–3 OT	Buffalo Sabres	20–12–8	48	W
41	8	Calgary Flames	2–2 OT	Pittsburgh Penguins	20–12–9	49	T
42	11	Boston Bruins	4–5 OT	Pittsburgh Penguins	21–12–9	51	W
43	13	Florida Panthers	2–2 OT	Pittsburgh Penguins	21–12–10	52	T
44	15	Edmonton Oilers	3–4	Pittsburgh Penguins	22–12–10	54	W
45	18	Pittsburgh Penguins	3–6	Quebec Nordiques	22–13–10	54	L
46	25	Ottawa Senators	2–4	Pittsburgh Penguins	23–13–10	56	W
47	27	Quebec Nordiques	0–3	Pittsburgh Penguins	24–13–10	58	W
48	29	Pittsburgh Penguins	4–4 OT	Toronto Maple Leafs	24–13–11	59	T
49	31	Pittsburgh Penguins	3–5	New York Rangers	24–14–11	59	L

February: 7–6–1 (home: 4–3–1; road: 3–3–0), 15 Points

#	Feb	Visitor	Score	Home	Record	Points	Recap
50	1	Florida Panthers	1–2	Pittsburgh Penguins	25–14–11	61	W
51	4	Pittsburgh Penguins	6–3	Detroit Red Wings	26–14–11	63	W
52	5	Pittsburgh Penguins	3–7	New Jersey Devils	26–15–11	63	L
53	7	Montreal Canadiens	4–1	Pittsburgh Penguins	26–16–11	63	L
54	10	New York Islanders	5–3	Pittsburgh Penguins	26–17–11	63	L
55	12	Dallas Stars	9–3	Pittsburgh Penguins	26–18–11	63	L
56	13	Pittsburgh Penguins	3–0	Philadelphia Flyers	27–18–11	65	W
57	15	Winnipeg Jets	3–5	Pittsburgh Penguins	28–18–11	67	W
58	17	Hartford Whalers	4–6	Pittsburgh Penguins	29–18–11	69	W
59	19	Pittsburgh Penguins	1–4	Montreal Canadiens	29–19–11	69	L
60	21	Pittsburgh Penguins	3–4 OT	New York Rangers	29–20–11	69	L
61	24	Mighty Ducks of Anaheim	2–2 OT	Pittsburgh Penguins	29–20–12	70	T
62	26	Buffalo Sabres	3–4	Pittsburgh Penguins	30–20–12	72	W
63	28	Pittsburgh Penguins	4–3	Florida Panthers	31–20–12	74	W

March: 9–5–1 (home: 4–2–1; road: 5–3–0), 19 Points

#	Mar	Visitor	Score	Home	Record	Points	Recap
64	4	Pittsburgh Penguins	1–2	Buffalo Sabres	31–21–12	74	L
65	6	Pittsburgh Penguins	5–3	Winnipeg Jets	32–21–12	76	W
66	8	Boston Bruins	3–7	Pittsburgh Penguins	33–21–12	78	W
67	10	Toronto Maple Leafs	4–2	Pittsburgh Penguins	33–22–12	78	L
68	12	New York Rangers	2–6	Pittsburgh Penguins	34–22–12	80	W
69	13	Pittsburgh Penguins	3–2	Hartford Whalers	35–22–12	82	W
70	15	Washington Capitals	5–4 OT	Pittsburgh Penguins	35–23–12	82	L
71	17	Pittsburgh Penguins	4–2	Boston Bruins	36–23–12	84	W
72	19	Vancouver Canucks	4–5	Pittsburgh Penguins	37–23–12	86	W
73	20	Pittsburgh Penguins	2–1	New York Islanders	38–23–12	88	W
74	22	San Jose Sharks	2–2 OT	Pittsburgh Penguins	38–23–13	89	T
75	24	Ottawa Senators	1–5	Pittsburgh Penguins	39–23–13	91	W
76	26	Pittsburgh Penguins	3–5	Calgary Flames	39–24–13	91	L
77	27	Pittsburgh Penguins	3–5	Edmonton Oilers	39–25–13	91	L
78	30	Pittsburgh Penguins	3–1	Vancouver Canucks	40–25–13	93	W

April: 4–2–0 (home: 3–0–0; road: 1–2–0), 8 Points

#	Apr	Visitor	Score	Home	Record	Points	Recap
79	3	Boston Bruins	2–6	Pittsburgh Penguins	41–25–13	95	W
80	4	Tampa Bay Lightning	1–2	Pittsburgh Penguins	42–25–13	97	W
81	6	New Jersey Devils	1–3	Pittsburgh Penguins	43–25–13	99	W
82	8	Pittsburgh Penguins	2–7	New Jersey Devils	43–26–13	99	L
83	9	Pittsburgh Penguins	1–9	Montreal Canadiens	43–27–13	99	L
84	11	Pittsburgh Penguins	4–0	Ottawa Senators	44–27–13	101	W

Legend: W Win (2 points) L Loss (0 points) T Tie (1 point)

=== Playoffs ===
1994 Stanley Cup playoffs
Eastern Conference Quarterfinals vs. (7) Washington Capitals – Capitals win 4–2

Game	Date	Visitor	Score	Home	Series	Recap
1	April 17	Washington Capitals	3–5	Pittsburgh Penguins	0–1	L
2	April 19	Washington Capitals	2–1	Pittsburgh Penguins	1–1	W
3	April 21	Pittsburgh Penguins	0–2	Washington Capitals	1–2	L
4	April 23	Pittsburgh Penguins	1–4	Washington Capitals	1–3	L
5	April 25	Washington Capitals	3–2	Pittsburgh Penguins	2–3	W
6	April 27	Pittsburgh Penguins	3–6	Washington Capitals	2–4	L

Legend: W Win L Loss

== Player statistics ==
Skaters

Regular season
Player	GP	G	A	Pts	+/−	PIM
Jaromir Jagr	80	32	67	99	15	61
Ron Francis	82	27	66	93	–3	62
Kevin Stevens	83	41	47	88	–24	155
Larry Murphy	84	17	56	73	10	44
Joe Mullen	84	38	32	70	9	41
Martin Straka	84	30	34	64	24	24
Doug Brown	77	18	37	55	19	18
Rick Tocchet	51	14	26	40	–15	134
Mario Lemieux	22	17	20	37	–2	32
Ulf Samuelsson	80	5	24	29	23	199
Shawn McEachern^{†}	27	12	9	21	13	10
Marty McSorley^{‡}	47	3	18	21	–9	139
Tomas Sandström^{†}	27	6	11	17	5	24
Bryan Trottier	41	4	11	15	–12	36
Peter Taglianetti	60	2	12	14	5	142
Kjell Samuelsson	59	5	8	13	18	118
Greg Brown	36	3	8	11	1	28
Mike Stapleton^{‡}	58	7	4	11	–4	18
Markus Näslund	71	4	7	11	–3	27
Jeff Daniels^{‡}	63	3	5	8	–1	20
Grant Jennings	61	2	4	6	–10	126
Jim Paek^{‡}	41	0	4	4	–7	8
Mike Ramsey	65	2	2	4	–4	22
Ed Patterson	27	3	1	4	–5	10
Greg Hawgood^{†}	12	1	2	3	–1	8
Patrick Neaton	9	1	1	2	3	12
Larry DePalma	7	1	0	1	1	5
Mike Needham^{‡}	25	1	0	1	0	2
Jim McKenzie^{†}	11	0	0	0	–5	16
Ladislav Karabin	9	0	0	0	0	2
Greg Andrusak	3	0	0	0	–1	2
Chris Tamer	12	0	0	0	3	9
Justin Duberman	4	0	0	0	0	0
Total		299	516	815	—	1,554

Playoffs
Player	GP	G	A	Pts	+/−	PIM
Mario Lemieux	6	4	3	7	–4	2
Jaromir Jagr	6	2	4	6	–3	16
Larry Murphy	6	0	5	5	–6	0
Rick Tocchet	6	2	3	5	–2	20
Peter Taglianetti	5	0	2	2	2	16
Ron Francis	6	0	2	2	–2	6
Kevin Stevens	6	1	1	2	–5	10
Martin Straka	6	1	0	1	–3	2
Ulf Samuelsson	6	0	1	1	–3	18
Greg Brown	6	0	1	1	–2	4
Joe Mullen	6	1	0	1	–1	2
Shawn McEachern	6	1	0	1	–2	2
Chris Tamer	5	0	0	0	1	2
Jim McKenzie	3	0	0	0	0	0
Mike Ramsey	1	0	0	0	0	0
Kjell Samuelsson	6	0	0	0	0	26
Greg Hawgood	1	0	0	0	0	0
Bryan Trottier	2	0	0	0	0	0
Doug Brown	6	0	0	0	0	2
Larry DePalma	1	0	0	0	0	0
Grant Jennings	3	0	0	0	–1	2
Tomas Sandström	6	0	0	0	–4	4
Total		12	22	34	—	134

Goaltenders

Regular Season
Player	GP	TOI	W	L	T	GA	GAA	SA	SV%	SO	G	A	PIM
Tom Barrasso	44	2481:59	22	15	5	139	3.36	1304	0.893	2	0	1	42
Ken Wregget	42	2455:53	21	12	7	138	3.37	1291	0.893	1	0	1	8
Roberto Romano	2	125:00	1	0	1	3	1.44	56	0.946	0	0	0	0
Rob Dopson	2	45:25	0	0	0	3	3.96	23	0.870	0	0	0	0
Total		5108:17	44	27	13	283	3.32	2674	0.894	3	0	2	50

Playoffs
Player	GP	TOI	W	L	GA	GAA	SA	SV%	SO	G	A	PIM
Tom Barrasso	6	356:22	2	4	17	2.86	162	0.895	0	0	0	4
Total		356:22	2	4	17	2.86	162	0.895	0	0	0	4

^{†}Denotes player spent time with another team before joining the Penguins. Stats reflect time with the Penguins only.
^{‡}Denotes player was traded mid-season. Stats reflect time with the Penguins only.

== Awards and records ==
- Mario Lemieux became the first person to score 700 assists for the Penguins. He did so in a 3–3 tie with San Jose on November 2.
- Mario Lemieux became the first person to score 1200 points for the Penguins. He did so in a 3–5 loss to Calgary on March 26.

=== Awards ===
Player	Award
Tom Barrasso	Edward J. DeBartolo Community Service Award
Ron Francis	Most Valuable Player Award; Player's Player Award; Booster Club Award; Bob Johnson Memorial Award; NHL Second team All-Star
Jaromir Jagr	Bowser Pontiac Leading Point Scorer Award
Joe Mullen	Molson Breweries USA Baz Bastien Memorial "Good Guy" Award; Bob Johnson Memorial Award; Unsung Hero Award
Kevin Stevens	Pittsburgh Penguins Masterton Nominee
Ken Wregget	Edward J. DeBartolo Community Service Award

== Transactions ==
The Penguins were involved in the following transactions during the 1993–94 season:

=== Trades ===
August 27, 1993	To Los Angeles Kings: Shawn McEachern	To Pittsburgh Penguins: Marty McSorley
October 8, 1993	To Boston Bruins: Paul Stanton	To Pittsburgh Penguins: 1994 third round pick (#73–Greg Crozier)
February 15, 1994	To Los Angeles Kings: Marty McSorley; Jim Paek	To Pittsburgh Penguins: Shawn McEachern; Tomas Sandstrom
March 19, 1994	To Florida Panthers: Jeff Daniels	To Pittsburgh Penguins: Greg Hawgood
March 21, 1994	To Dallas Stars: Mike Needham	To Pittsburgh Penguins: Jim McKenzie

=== Free agents ===
Player	Acquired from	Lost to	Date
Steve Bancroft	Florida Panthers		August 2, 1993
Todd Hawkins	Toronto Maple Leafs		August 20, 1993
Dave Tippett		Philadelphia Flyers	August 30, 1993
Doug Brown	New Jersey Devils		September 28, 1993
Roberto Romano	Boston Bruins		October 7, 1993

=== Waivers ===
Player	Claimed from	Lost to	Date
Mike Stapleton		Edmonton Oilers	February 19, 1994
Larry DePalma	New York Islanders		March 9, 1994

=== Signings ===
Player	Date
Greg Brown	September 29, 1993
Ladislav Karabin	October 10, 1993

== Draft picks ==
The Penguins' selected eleven players at the 1993 NHL entry draft.

Round	Pick #	Player	Position	Nationality	College/junior/club team (league)
1	26	Stefan Bergqvist	Defense	Sweden	Leksands IF (SEL)
2	52	Domenic Pittis	Center	Canada	Lethbridge Hurricanes (WHL)
3	62^{[a]}	Dave Roche	Left wing	Canada	Peterborough Petes (OHL)
4	104	Jonas Andersson-Junkka	Defense	Sweden	Kiruna (Sweden)
5	130	Chris Kelleher	Defense	United States	St. Sebastian's (Mass. H.S.)
6	156	Patrick Lalime	Goaltender	Canada	Shawinigan Cataractes (QMJHL)
7	182	Sean Selmser	Left wing	Canada	Red Deer Rebels (WHL)
8	208	Larry McMorran	Center	Canada	Seattle Thunderbirds (WHL)
9	234	Timothy Harberts	Center	United States	Wayzata H.S. (Minn.)
10	260	Leonid Toropchenko	Center	Russia	Springfield Indians (AHL)
11	286	Hans Jonsson	Defense	Sweden	Modo Hockey Ornskoldsvik (SEL)

Draft notes

- ^{a} The Philadelphia Flyers' third-round pick (from the Winnipeg Jets) went to the Pittsburgh Penguins as a result of a February 19, 1992, trade that sent Mark Recchi, Brian Benning and a 1992 first-round pick to the Flyers in exchange for Kjell Samuelsson, Rick Tocchet, Ken Wregget and this pick.
- The Pittsburgh Penguins' third-round pick went to the Tampa Bay Lightning as the result of a March 22, 1993, trade that sent Peter Taglianetti to the Penguins in exchange for this pick.

== Farm teams ==
The IHL's Cleveland Lumberjacks finished last in the Atlantic Division with a 31-36-14 record.

The Louisville Icehawks of the East Coast Hockey League finished fifth in the West Division with a 16-44-8 record, qualifying for the playoffs. They upset the Brabham Cup champion Knoxville Cherokees in the first round before being swept by the Birmingham Bulls in the second round.
