= 1993–94 Chicago Blackhawks season =

National Hockey League team season

1993–94 Chicago Blackhawks
- Division: 5th Central
- Conference: 6th Western
- 1993–94 record: 39–36–9
- Home record: 21–16–5
- Road record: 18–20–4
- Goals for: 254
- Goals against: 240

Team information
- General manager: Bob Pulford
- Coach: Darryl Sutter
- Captain: Dirk Graham
- Alternate captains: Chris Chelios; Jeremy Roenick
- Arena: Chicago Stadium
- Average attendance: 17,683
- Minor league affiliates: Indianapolis Ice; Columbus Chill

Team leaders
- Goals: Jeremy Roenick (46)
- Assists: Jeremy Roenick (61)
- Points: Jeremy Roenick (107)
- Penalty minutes: Chris Chelios (212)
- Plus/minus: Jeremy Roenick (+21)
- Wins: Ed Belfour (37)
- Goals against average: Ed Belfour (2.67)

The 1993–94 Chicago Blackhawks season was the 68th season of operation of the Chicago Blackhawks in the National Hockey League and the final season for the Blackhawks at Chicago Stadium.

== Regular season ==
=== Final standings ===
Central Division
| No. | CR | | GP | W | L | T | GF | GA | Pts |
|---|---|---|---|---|---|---|---|---|---|
| 1 | 1 | **Detroit Red Wings** | 84 | 46 | 30 | 8 | 356 | 275 | 100 |
| 2 | 2 | **Toronto Maple Leafs** | 84 | 43 | 29 | 12 | 280 | 243 | 98 |
| 3 | 4 | **Dallas Stars** | 84 | 42 | 29 | 13 | 286 | 265 | 97 |
| 4 | 5 | **St. Louis Blues** | 84 | 40 | 33 | 11 | 270 | 283 | 91 |
| 5 | 6 | **Chicago Blackhawks** | 84 | 39 | 36 | 9 | 254 | 240 | 87 |
| 6 | 12 | Winnipeg Jets | 84 | 24 | 51 | 9 | 245 | 344 | 57 |

Note: No. = Division rank, CR = Conference rank, W = Wins, L = Losses, T = Ties, GF = Goals For, GA = Goals Against, Pts = Points
Teams that qualified for the playoffs are highlighted in bold.

Western Conference
| R | | Div | GP | W | L | T | GF | GA | Pts |
|---|---|---|---|---|---|---|---|---|---|
| **1** | **y- Detroit Red Wings *** | **CEN** | **84** | **46** | **30** | **8** | **356** | **275** | **100** |
| **2** | **x- Calgary Flames *** | **PAC** | **84** | **42** | **29** | **13** | **302** | **256** | **97** |
| **3** | **Toronto Maple Leafs** | **CEN** | **84** | **43** | **29** | **12** | **280** | **243** | **98** |
| **4** | **Dallas Stars** | **CEN** | **84** | **42** | **29** | **13** | **286** | **265** | **97** |
| **5** | **St. Louis Blues** | **CEN** | **84** | **40** | **33** | **11** | **270** | **283** | **91** |
| **6** | **Chicago Blackhawks** | **CEN** | **84** | **39** | **36** | **9** | **254** | **240** | **87** |
| **7** | **Vancouver Canucks** | **PAC** | **84** | **41** | **40** | **3** | **279** | **276** | **85** |
| **8** | **San Jose Sharks** | **PAC** | **84** | **33** | **35** | **16** | **252** | **265** | **82** |
| 9 | Mighty Ducks of Anaheim | PAC | 84 | 33 | 46 | 5 | 229 | 251 | 71 |
| 10 | Los Angeles Kings | PAC | 84 | 27 | 45 | 12 | 294 | 322 | 66 |
| 11 | Edmonton Oilers | PAC | 84 | 25 | 45 | 14 | 261 | 305 | 64 |
| 12 | Winnipeg Jets | CEN | 84 | 24 | 51 | 9 | 245 | 344 | 57 |

Divisions: CEN – Central, PAC – Pacific

bold – Qualified for playoffs; x – Won division; y – Won Conference (and division); * – Division leader

== Schedule and results ==
=== Regular season ===
1993–94 regular season
October: 4–7–2 (home: 4–4–1; road: 0–3–1)

| Game | Date | Score | Opponent | Record | Recap |
|---|---|---|---|---|---|
| 1 | October 6, 1993 | 4–4 OT | Florida Panthers (1993–94) | 0–0–1 | T |
| 2 | October 9, 1993 | 1–2 | @ Toronto Maple Leafs (1993–94) | 0–1–1 | L |
| 3 | October 10, 1993 | 4–3 OT | Winnipeg Jets (1993–94) | 1–1–1 | W |
| 4 | October 12, 1993 | 3–3 OT | @ Dallas Stars (1993–94) | 1–1–2 | T |
| 5 | October 14, 1993 | 2–6 | Hartford Whalers (1993–94) | 1–2–2 | L |
| 6 | October 16, 1993 | 0–1 OT | @ Winnipeg Jets (1993–94) | 1–3–2 | L |
| 7 | October 18, 1993 | 3–5 | Dallas Stars (1993–94) | 1–4–2 | L |
| 8 | October 21, 1993 | 3–2 | Quebec Nordiques (1993–94) | 2–4–2 | W |
| 9 | October 23, 1993 | 4–2 | Detroit Red Wings (1993–94) | 3–4–2 | W |
| 10 | October 26, 1993 | 9–2 | St. Louis Blues (1993–94) | 4–4–2 | W |
| 11 | October 28, 1993 | 2–4 | Toronto Maple Leafs (1993–94) | 4–5–2 | L |
| 12 | October 30, 1993 | 3–4 | @ Pittsburgh Penguins (1993–94) | 4–6–2 | L |
| 13 | October 31, 1993 | 6–9 | Philadelphia Flyers (1993–94) | 4–7–2 | L |

November: 8–2–0 (home: 4–0–0; road: 4–2–0)

| Game | Date | Score | Opponent | Record | Recap |
|---|---|---|---|---|---|
| 14 | November 4, 1993 | 4–2 | New York Islanders (1993–94) | 5–7–2 | W |
| 15 | November 7, 1993 | 3–0 | Edmonton Oilers (1993–94) | 6–7–2 | W |
| 16 | November 11, 1993 | 4–1 | Pittsburgh Penguins (1993–94) | 7–7–2 | W |
| 17 | November 13, 1993 | 3–2 | @ Toronto Maple Leafs (1993–94) | 8–7–2 | W |
| 18 | November 14, 1993 | 4–1 | Dallas Stars (1993–94) | 9–7–2 | W |
| 19 | November 18, 1993 | 3–2 | @ Florida Panthers (1993–94) | 10–7–2 | W |
| 20 | November 20, 1993 | 3–4 | @ Tampa Bay Lightning (1993–94) | 10–8–2 | L |
| 21 | November 24, 1993 | 3–1 | @ Edmonton Oilers (1993–94) | 11–8–2 | W |
| 22 | November 26, 1993 | 6–3 | @ Calgary Flames (1993–94) | 12–8–2 | W |
| 23 | November 29, 1993 | 1–2 OT | @ Vancouver Canucks (1993–94) | 12–9–2 | L |

December: 6–5–2 (home: 4–1–0; road: 2–4–2)

| Game | Date | Score | Opponent | Record | Recap |
|---|---|---|---|---|---|
| 24 | December 4, 1993 | 2–2 OT | @ New Jersey Devils (1993–94) | 12–9–3 | T |
| 25 | December 7, 1993 | 2–3 | @ St. Louis Blues (1993–94) | 12–10–3 | L |
| 26 | December 11, 1993 | 5–4 | @ Boston Bruins (1993–94) | 13–10–3 | W |
| 27 | December 12, 1993 | 2–1 | San Jose Sharks (1993–94) | 14–10–3 | W |
| 28 | December 15, 1993 | 3–2 | @ Dallas Stars (1993–94) | 15–10–3 | W |
| 29 | December 18, 1993 | 2–2 OT | @ Philadelphia Flyers (1993–94) | 15–10–4 | T |
| 30 | December 19, 1993 | 2–0 | Mighty Ducks of Anaheim (1993–94) | 16–10–4 | W |
| 31 | December 21, 1993 | 1–5 | @ Detroit Red Wings (1993–94) | 16–11–4 | L |
| 32 | December 23, 1993 | 5–3 | San Jose Sharks (1993–94) | 17–11–4 | W |
| 33 | December 26, 1993 | 2–3 | @ St. Louis Blues (1993–94) | 17–12–4 | L |
| 34 | December 27, 1993 | 5–2 | Toronto Maple Leafs (1993–94) | 18–12–4 | W |
| 35 | December 29, 1993 | 2–3 | @ Winnipeg Jets (1993–94) | 18–13–4 | L |
| 36 | December 31, 1993 | 2–5 | Dallas Stars (1993–94) | 18–14–4 | L |

January: 5–6–2 (home: 2–5–1; road: 3–1–1)

| Game | Date | Score | Opponent | Record | Recap |
|---|---|---|---|---|---|
| 37 | January 2, 1994 | 5–1 | Winnipeg Jets (1993–94) | 19–14–4 | W |
| 38 | January 4, 1994 | 2–1 OT | @ Dallas Stars (1993–94) | 20–14–4 | W |
| 39 | January 6, 1994 | 2–6 | Mighty Ducks of Anaheim (1993–94) | 20–15–4 | L |
| 40 | January 8, 1994 | 1–4 | @ Washington Capitals (1993–94) | 20–16–4 | L |
| 41 | January 9, 1994 | 2–4 | Edmonton Oilers (1993–94) | 20–17–4 | L |
| 42 | January 11, 1994 | 2–5 | Buffalo Sabres (1993–94) | 20–18–4 | L |
| 43 | January 13, 1994 | 1–0 | Tampa Bay Lightning (1993–94) | 21–18–4 | W |
| 44 | January 15, 1994 | 5–5 OT | @ New York Islanders (1993–94) | 21–18–5 | T |
| 45 | January 16, 1994 | 1–5 | New York Rangers (1993–94) | 21–19–5 | L |
| 46 | January 25, 1994 | 5–0 | @ Detroit Red Wings (1993–94) | 22–19–5 | W |
| 47 | January 27, 1994 | 3–4 OT | Detroit Red Wings (1993–94) | 22–20–5 | L |
| 48 | January 29, 1994 | 3–3 OT | Ottawa Senators (1993–94) | 22–20–6 | T |
| 49 | January 31, 1994 | 1–0 | @ Ottawa Senators (1993–94) | 23–20–6 | W |

February: 6–7–1 (home: 1–2–1; road: 5–5–0)

| Game | Date | Score | Opponent | Record | Recap |
|---|---|---|---|---|---|
| 50 | February 2, 1994 | 4–6 | @ Vancouver Canucks (1993–94) | 23–21–6 | L |
| 51 | February 4, 1994 | 3–1 | @ Edmonton Oilers (1993–94) | 24–21–6 | W |
| 52 | February 6, 1994 | 3–2 | @ Mighty Ducks of Anaheim (1993–94) | 25–21–6 | W |
| 53 | February 8, 1994 | 3–4 | @ San Jose Sharks (1993–94) | 25–22–6 | L |
| 54 | February 9, 1994 | 2–4 | @ Los Angeles Kings (1993–94) | 25–23–6 | L |
| 55 | February 11, 1994 | 3–4 | @ San Jose Sharks (1993–94) | 25–24–6 | L |
| 56 | February 13, 1994 | 0–1 | @ San Jose Sharks (1993–94) | 25–25–6 | L |
| 57 | February 14, 1994 | 4–2 | @ Calgary Flames (1993–94) | 26–25–6 | W |
| 58 | February 17, 1994 | 2–4 | Vancouver Canucks (1993–94) | 26–26–6 | L |
| 59 | February 18, 1994 | 7–2 | @ Winnipeg Jets (1993–94) | 27–26–6 | W |
| 60 | February 20, 1994 | 1–1 OT | New Jersey Devils (1993–94) | 27–26–7 | T |
| 61 | February 24, 1994 | 6–3 | Winnipeg Jets (1993–94) | 28–26–7 | W |
| 62 | February 25, 1994 | 3–1 | @ Buffalo Sabres (1993–94) | 29–26–7 | W |
| 63 | February 27, 1994 | 0–4 | Boston Bruins (1993–94) | 29–27–7 | L |

March: 6–7–2 (home: 3–3–2; road: 3–4–0)

| Game | Date | Score | Opponent | Record | Recap |
|---|---|---|---|---|---|
| 64 | March 3, 1994 | 4–2 | Calgary Flames (1993–94) | 30–27–7 | W |
| 65 | March 6, 1994 | 3–3 OT | Los Angeles Kings (1993–94) | 30–27–8 | T |
| 66 | March 8, 1994 | 3–0 | Mighty Ducks of Anaheim (1993–94) | 31–27–8 | W |
| 67 | March 9, 1994 | 4–0 | @ Los Angeles Kings (1993–94) | 32–27–8 | W |
| 68 | March 11, 1994 | 3–2 | @ Mighty Ducks of Anaheim (1993–94) | 33–27–8 | W |
| 69 | March 13, 1994 | 5–2 | Vancouver Canucks (1993–94) | 34–27–8 | W |
| 70 | March 14, 1994 | 1–5 | @ Quebec Nordiques (1993–94) | 34–28–8 | L |
| 71 | March 16, 1994 | 3–5 | @ Montreal Canadiens (1993–94) | 34–29–8 | L |
| 72 | March 18, 1994 | 7–3 | @ New York Rangers (1993–94) | 35–29–8 | W |
| 73 | March 20, 1994 | 3–4 OT | St. Louis Blues (1993–94) | 35–30–8 | L |
| 74 | March 22, 1994 | 1–3 | @ Detroit Red Wings (1993–94) | 35–31–8 | L |
| 75 | March 24, 1994 | 5–5 OT | Montreal Canadiens (1993–94) | 35–31–9 | T |
| 76 | March 27, 1994 | 1–3 | Detroit Red Wings (1993–94) | 35–32–9 | L |
| 77 | March 30, 1994 | 2–3 OT | @ Hartford Whalers (1993–94) | 35–33–9 | L |
| 78 | March 31, 1994 | 3–6 | Washington Capitals (1993–94) | 35–34–9 | L |

April: 4–2–0 (home: 3–1–0; road: 1–1–0)

| Game | Date | Score | Opponent | Record | Recap |
|---|---|---|---|---|---|
| 79 | April 3, 1994 | 2–1 | Calgary Flames (1993–94) | 36–34–9 | W |
| 80 | April 5, 1994 | 1–5 | @ St. Louis Blues (1993–94) | 36–35–9 | L |
| 81 | April 8, 1994 | 6–1 | St. Louis Blues (1993–94) | 37–35–9 | W |
| 82 | April 10, 1994 | 2–1 | Los Angeles Kings (1993–94) | 38–35–9 | W |
| 83 | April 12, 1994 | 4–3 | @ Toronto Maple Leafs (1993–94) | 39–35–9 | W |
| 84 | April 14, 1994 | 4–6 | Toronto Maple Leafs (1993–94) | 39–36–9 | L |

Legend: W Win (2 points) L Loss (0 points) T Tie (1 point)

=== Playoffs ===
1994 Stanley Cup playoffs
Western Conference Quarterfinals vs. (3) Toronto Maple Leafs – Maple Leafs win 4–2

| Game | Date | Score | Opponent | Series | Recap |
|---|---|---|---|---|---|
| 1 | April 18, 1994 | 1–5 | @ Toronto Maple Leafs | Maple Leafs lead 1–0 | L |
| 2 | April 20, 1994 | 0–1 OT | @ Toronto Maple Leafs | Maple Leafs lead 2–0 | L |
| 3 | April 23, 1994 | 5–4 | Toronto Maple Leafs | Maple Leafs lead 2–1 | W |
| 4 | April 24, 1994 | 4–3 OT | Toronto Maple Leafs | Series tied 2–2 | W |
| 5 | April 26, 1994 | 0–1 | @ Toronto Maple Leafs | Maple Leafs lead 3–2 | L |
| 6 | April 28, 1994 | 0–1 | Toronto Maple Leafs | Maple Leafs lead 4–2 | L |

Legend: W Win L Loss

== Player statistics ==
=== Regular season ===
Scoring

| Player | Pos | GP | G | A | Pts | PIM | +/- | PPG | SHG | GWG |
|---|---|---|---|---|---|---|---|---|---|---|
| Jeremy Roenick | C | 84 | 46 | 61 | 107 | 125 | 21 | 24 | 5 | 5 |
| Joe Murphy | RW | 81 | 31 | 39 | 70 | 111 | 1 | 7 | 4 | 4 |
| Chris Chelios | D | 76 | 16 | 44 | 60 | 212 | 12 | 7 | 1 | 2 |
| Brent Sutter | C | 73 | 9 | 29 | 38 | 43 | 17 | 3 | 2 | 0 |
| Brian Noonan | RW | 64 | 14 | 21 | 35 | 57 | 2 | 8 | 0 | 3 |
| Dirk Graham | W | 67 | 15 | 18 | 33 | 45 | 13 | 0 | 2 | 5 |
| Stephane Matteau | LW | 65 | 15 | 16 | 31 | 55 | 10 | 2 | 0 | 2 |
| Michel Goulet | LW | 56 | 16 | 14 | 30 | 26 | 1 | 3 | 0 | 6 |
| Christian Ruuttu | C | 54 | 9 | 20 | 29 | 68 | -4 | 1 | 1 | 1 |
| Steve Smith | D | 57 | 5 | 22 | 27 | 174 | -5 | 1 | 0 | 1 |
| Rich Sutter | RW | 83 | 12 | 14 | 26 | 108 | -8 | 0 | 0 | 2 |
| Eric Weinrich | D | 54 | 3 | 23 | 26 | 31 | 6 | 1 | 0 | 2 |
| Patrick Poulin | C | 58 | 12 | 13 | 25 | 40 | 0 | 1 | 0 | 3 |
| Jocelyn Lemieux | RW | 66 | 12 | 8 | 20 | 63 | 5 | 0 | 0 | 0 |
| Frantisek Kucera | D | 60 | 4 | 13 | 17 | 34 | 9 | 2 | 0 | 0 |
| Jeff Shantz | C | 52 | 3 | 13 | 16 | 30 | -14 | 0 | 0 | 0 |
| Neil Wilkinson | D | 72 | 3 | 9 | 12 | 116 | 2 | 1 | 0 | 0 |
| Kevin Todd | C | 35 | 5 | 6 | 11 | 16 | -2 | 1 | 0 | 1 |
| Paul Ysebaert | C | 11 | 5 | 3 | 8 | 8 | 1 | 2 | 0 | 1 |
| Keith Carney | D | 30 | 3 | 5 | 8 | 35 | 15 | 0 | 0 | 0 |
| Steve Dubinsky | C | 27 | 2 | 6 | 8 | 16 | 1 | 0 | 0 | 0 |
| Cam Russell | D | 67 | 1 | 7 | 8 | 200 | 10 | 0 | 0 | 0 |
| Randy Cunneyworth | LW | 16 | 4 | 3 | 7 | 13 | 1 | 0 | 0 | 1 |
| Darin Kimble | RW | 65 | 4 | 2 | 6 | 133 | 2 | 0 | 0 | 0 |
| Gary Suter | D | 16 | 2 | 3 | 5 | 18 | -9 | 2 | 0 | 0 |
| Bryan Marchment | D | 13 | 1 | 4 | 5 | 42 | -2 | 0 | 0 | 0 |
| Tony Amonte | RW | 7 | 1 | 3 | 4 | 6 | -5 | 1 | 0 | 0 |
| Ed Belfour | G | 70 | 0 | 4 | 4 | 61 | 0 | 0 | 0 | 0 |
| Craig Muni | D | 9 | 0 | 4 | 4 | 4 | 3 | 0 | 0 | 0 |
| Dave Christian | RW | 9 | 0 | 3 | 3 | 0 | 0 | 0 | 0 | 0 |
| Sergei Krivokrasov | RW | 9 | 1 | 0 | 1 | 4 | -2 | 0 | 0 | 0 |
| Ivan Droppa | D | 12 | 0 | 1 | 1 | 12 | 2 | 0 | 0 | 0 |
| Jeff Hackett | G | 22 | 0 | 1 | 1 | 2 | 0 | 0 | 0 | 0 |
| Troy Murray | C | 12 | 0 | 1 | 1 | 6 | 1 | 0 | 0 | 0 |
| Robert Dirk | D | 6 | 0 | 0 | 0 | 26 | 0 | 0 | 0 | 0 |
| Tony Horacek | LW | 7 | 0 | 0 | 0 | 53 | 1 | 0 | 0 | 0 |
| Greg Smyth | D | 38 | 0 | 0 | 0 | 108 | -2 | 0 | 0 | 0 |
| Christian Soucy | G | 1 | 0 | 0 | 0 | 0 | 0 | 0 | 0 | 0 |

Goaltending

| Player | MIN | GP | W | L | T | GA | GAA | SO | SA | SV | SV% |
|---|---|---|---|---|---|---|---|---|---|---|---|
| Ed Belfour | 3998 | 70 | 37 | 24 | 6 | 178 | 2.67 | 7 | 1892 | 1714 | .906 |
| Jeff Hackett | 1084 | 22 | 2 | 12 | 3 | 62 | 3.43 | 0 | 566 | 504 | .890 |
| Christian Soucy | 3 | 1 | 0 | 0 | 0 | 0 | 0.00 | 0 | 0 | 0 | |
| Team: | 5085 | 84 | 39 | 36 | 9 | 240 | 2.83 | 7 | 2458 | 2218 | .902 |

=== Playoffs ===
Scoring

| Player | Pos | GP | G | A | Pts | PIM | +/- | PPG | SHG | GWG |
|---|---|---|---|---|---|---|---|---|---|---|
| Jeremy Roenick | C | 6 | 1 | 6 | 7 | 2 | 4 | 0 | 0 | 1 |
| Tony Amonte | RW | 6 | 4 | 2 | 6 | 4 | 4 | 1 | 0 | 1 |
| Gary Suter | D | 6 | 3 | 2 | 5 | 6 | 0 | 2 | 0 | 0 |
| Joe Murphy | RW | 6 | 1 | 3 | 4 | 25 | 2 | 0 | 0 | 0 |
| Chris Chelios | D | 6 | 1 | 1 | 2 | 8 | 0 | 1 | 0 | 0 |
| Eric Weinrich | D | 6 | 0 | 2 | 2 | 6 | 2 | 0 | 0 | 0 |
| Keith Carney | D | 6 | 0 | 1 | 1 | 4 | 2 | 0 | 0 | 0 |
| Dirk Graham | W | 6 | 0 | 1 | 1 | 4 | 0 | 0 | 0 | 0 |
| Ed Belfour | G | 6 | 0 | 0 | 0 | 2 | 0 | 0 | 0 | 0 |
| Dave Christian | RW | 1 | 0 | 0 | 0 | 0 | 0 | 0 | 0 | 0 |
| Randy Cunneyworth | LW | 6 | 0 | 0 | 0 | 8 | -1 | 0 | 0 | 0 |
| Robert Dirk | D | 2 | 0 | 0 | 0 | 15 | -1 | 0 | 0 | 0 |
| Steve Dubinsky | C | 6 | 0 | 0 | 0 | 10 | -1 | 0 | 0 | 0 |
| Darin Kimble | RW | 1 | 0 | 0 | 0 | 5 | -1 | 0 | 0 | 0 |
| Patrick Poulin | C | 4 | 0 | 0 | 0 | 0 | 0 | 0 | 0 | 0 |
| Christian Ruuttu | C | 6 | 0 | 0 | 0 | 2 | -2 | 0 | 0 | 0 |
| Jeff Shantz | C | 6 | 0 | 0 | 0 | 6 | -2 | 0 | 0 | 0 |
| Greg Smyth | D | 6 | 0 | 0 | 0 | 0 | -2 | 0 | 0 | 0 |
| Brent Sutter | C | 6 | 0 | 0 | 0 | 2 | 0 | 0 | 0 | 0 |
| Rich Sutter | RW | 6 | 0 | 0 | 0 | 2 | -1 | 0 | 0 | 0 |
| Neil Wilkinson | D | 4 | 0 | 0 | 0 | 0 | -1 | 0 | 0 | 0 |
| Paul Ysebaert | C | 6 | 0 | 0 | 0 | 8 | -2 | 0 | 0 | 0 |

Goaltending

| Player | MIN | GP | W | L | GA | GAA | SO | SA | SV | SV% |
|---|---|---|---|---|---|---|---|---|---|---|
| Ed Belfour | 360 | 6 | 2 | 4 | 15 | 2.50 | 0 | 191 | 176 | .921 |
| Team: | 360 | 6 | 2 | 4 | 15 | 2.50 | 0 | 191 | 176 | .921 |

Note: Pos = Position; GP = Games played; G = Goals; A = Assists; Pts = Points; +/- = plus/minus; PIM = Penalty minutes; PPG = Power-play goals; SHG = Short-handed goals; GWG = Game-winning goals
MIN = Minutes played; W = Wins; L = Losses; T = Ties; GA = Goals-against; GAA = Goals-against average; SO = Shutouts; SA = Shots against; SV = Shots saved; SV% = Save percentage;

== Draft picks ==
Chicago's draft picks at the 1993 NHL entry draft held at the Quebec Coliseum in Quebec City, Quebec.

| Round | # | Player | Nationality | College/Junior/Club team (League) |
|---|---|---|---|---|
| 1 | 24 | Eric Lecompte | Canada | Hull Olympiques (QMJHL) |
| 2 | 50 | Eric Manlow | Canada | Kitchener Rangers (OHL) |
| 3 | 54 | Bogdan Savenko | Russia | Niagara Falls Thunder (OHL) |
| 3 | 76 | Ryan Huska | Canada | Kamloops Blazers (WHL) |
| 4 | 90 | Eric Daze | Canada | Beauport Harfangs (QMJHL) |
| 4 | 102 | Patrik Pysz | Poland | Augsburger Panther (Germany) |
| 5 | 128 | Jonni Vauhkonen | Finland | Reipas Lahti (Finland) |
| 7 | 180 | Tom White | United States | Westminster School (USHS-CT) |
| 8 | 206 | Sergei Petrov | Russia | Cloquet High School (USHS-MN) |
| 9 | 232 | Mike Rusk | Canada | Guelph Storm (OHL) |
| 10 | 258 | Mike McGhan | Canada | Prince Albert Raiders (WHL) |
| 11 | 284 | Tom Noble | United States | Catholic Memorial School (USHS-MA) |

== See also ==
- 1993–94 NHL season
