= 1993–94 Detroit Red Wings season =

National Hockey League team season

1993–94 Detroit Red Wings
- Central Division champions
- Division: 1st Central
- Conference: 1st Western
- 1993–94 record: 46–30–8
- Home record: 23–13–6
- Road record: 23–17–2
- Goals for: 356
- Goals against: 275

Team information
- General manager: Bryan Murray
- Coach: Scotty Bowman
- Captain: Steve Yzerman
- Alternate captains: Steve Chiasson; Paul Coffey; Bob Probert
- Arena: Joe Louis Arena
- Minor league affiliates: Adirondack Red Wings; Toledo Storm; Detroit Falcons

Team leaders
- Goals: Sergei Fedorov (56)
- Assists: Sergei Fedorov (64)
- Points: Sergei Fedorov (120)
- Penalty minutes: Bob Probert (275)
- Plus/minus: Sergei Fedorov (48)
- Wins: Chris Osgood (23)
- Goals against average: Bob Essensa (2.62)

The 1993–94 Detroit Red Wings season saw the Red Wings finish in first place in the Central Division with a record of 46 wins, 30 losses, and 8 ties for 100 points. They were eliminated in the first round of the playoffs by the San Jose Sharks in seven games.

== Offseason ==
On June 15, Scotty Bowman was named the team's new head coach.

== Regular season ==
The Red Wings led the NHL in goals (356), even-strength goals (249), short-handed goals (22) and shots on goal (2,990). Four Red Wings reached the 30-goal plateau and six reached the 70-point plateau. On Friday, February 11, 1994, the Red Wings scored three short-handed goals in a 6–3 win over the Philadelphia Flyers.

=== Final standings ===
Central Division
| No. | CR | | GP | W | L | T | GF | GA | Pts |
|---|---|---|---|---|---|---|---|---|---|
| 1 | 1 | **Detroit Red Wings** | 84 | 46 | 30 | 8 | 356 | 275 | 100 |
| 2 | 2 | **Toronto Maple Leafs** | 84 | 43 | 29 | 12 | 280 | 243 | 98 |
| 3 | 4 | **Dallas Stars** | 84 | 42 | 29 | 13 | 286 | 265 | 97 |
| 4 | 5 | **St. Louis Blues** | 84 | 40 | 33 | 11 | 270 | 283 | 91 |
| 5 | 6 | **Chicago Blackhawks** | 84 | 39 | 36 | 9 | 254 | 240 | 87 |
| 6 | 12 | Winnipeg Jets | 84 | 24 | 51 | 9 | 245 | 344 | 57 |

Note: No. = Division rank, CR = Conference rank, W = Wins, L = Losses, T = Ties, GF = Goals For, GA = Goals Against, Pts = Points
Teams that qualified for the playoffs are highlighted in bold.

Western Conference
| R | | Div | GP | W | L | T | GF | GA | Pts |
|---|---|---|---|---|---|---|---|---|---|
| **1** | **y- Detroit Red Wings *** | **CEN** | **84** | **46** | **30** | **8** | **356** | **275** | **100** |
| **2** | **x- Calgary Flames *** | **PAC** | **84** | **42** | **29** | **13** | **302** | **256** | **97** |
| **3** | **Toronto Maple Leafs** | **CEN** | **84** | **43** | **29** | **12** | **280** | **243** | **98** |
| **4** | **Dallas Stars** | **CEN** | **84** | **42** | **29** | **13** | **286** | **265** | **97** |
| **5** | **St. Louis Blues** | **CEN** | **84** | **40** | **33** | **11** | **270** | **283** | **91** |
| **6** | **Chicago Blackhawks** | **CEN** | **84** | **39** | **36** | **9** | **254** | **240** | **87** |
| **7** | **Vancouver Canucks** | **PAC** | **84** | **41** | **40** | **3** | **279** | **276** | **85** |
| **8** | **San Jose Sharks** | **PAC** | **84** | **33** | **35** | **16** | **252** | **265** | **82** |
| 9 | Mighty Ducks of Anaheim | PAC | 84 | 33 | 46 | 5 | 229 | 251 | 71 |
| 10 | Los Angeles Kings | PAC | 84 | 27 | 45 | 12 | 294 | 322 | 66 |
| 11 | Edmonton Oilers | PAC | 84 | 25 | 45 | 14 | 261 | 305 | 64 |
| 12 | Winnipeg Jets | CEN | 84 | 24 | 51 | 9 | 245 | 344 | 57 |

Divisions: CEN – Central, PAC – Pacific

bold – Qualified for playoffs; x – Won division; y – Won Conference (and division); * – Division leader

== Playoffs ==
The Red Wings, having finished 1st in the Western Conference and first in the NHL in scoring, were heavily favored to win in their first-round matchup against the eighth-seeded San Jose Sharks, who were making their first playoff appearance in franchise history. Despite outshooting San Jose 218–153 and outscoring them 27–21 in the series, the Red Wings were upset in seven games for the second consecutive playoff year, becoming the first top-seeded team in North American sports history to ever lose to an eighth seed. In Game 7, played on April 30, 1994, the Sharks edged the Wings 3–2 to advance to the second round.

== Schedule and results ==
=== Regular season ===
1993–94 regular season
October: 5–7–0 (home: 2–3–0; road: 3–4–0)

| Game | Date | Score | Opponent | Record | Recap |
|---|---|---|---|---|---|
| 1 | October 5, 1993 | 4–6 | @ Dallas Stars (1993–94) | 0–1–0 | L |
| 2 | October 8, 1993 | 7–2 | @ Mighty Ducks of Anaheim (1993–94) | 1–1–0 | W |
| 3 | October 9, 1993 | 3–10 | @ Los Angeles Kings (1993–94) | 1–2–0 | L |
| 4 | October 13, 1993 | 2–5 | St. Louis Blues (1993–94) | 1–3–0 | L |
| 5 | October 15, 1993 | 3–6 | @ Toronto Maple Leafs (1993–94) | 1–4–0 | L |
| 6 | October 16, 1993 | 1–2 | Toronto Maple Leafs (1993–94) | 1–5–0 | L |
| 7 | October 18, 1993 | 6–4 | @ Buffalo Sabres (1993–94) | 2–5–0 | W |
| 8 | October 21, 1993 | 6–2 | Winnipeg Jets (1993–94) | 3–5–0 | W |
| 9 | October 23, 1993 | 2–4 | @ Chicago Blackhawks (1993–94) | 3–6–0 | L |
| 10 | October 25, 1993 | 3–5 | Dallas Stars (1993–94) | 3–7–0 | L |
| 11 | October 27, 1993 | 8–3 | Los Angeles Kings (1993–94) | 4–7–0 | W |
| 12 | October 30, 1993 | 5–3 | @ Quebec Nordiques (1993–94) | 5–7–0 | W |

November: 6–3–2 (home: 2–1–1; road: 4–2–1)

| Game | Date | Score | Opponent | Record | Recap |
|---|---|---|---|---|---|
| 13 | November 2, 1993 | 6–1 | Boston Bruins (1993–94) | 6–7–0 | W |
| 14 | November 4, 1993 | 3–3 OT | Toronto Maple Leafs (1993–94) | 6–7–1 | T |
| 15 | November 9, 1993 | 2–4 | Edmonton Oilers (1993–94) | 6–8–1 | L |
| 16 | November 13, 1993 | 7–3 | @ Pittsburgh Penguins (1993–94) | 7–8–1 | W |
| 17 | November 17, 1993 | 1–2 | @ Winnipeg Jets (1993–94) | 7–9–1 | L |
| 18 | November 20, 1993 | 4–3 OT | @ New Jersey Devils (1993–94) | 8–9–1 | W |
| 19 | November 21, 1993 | 2–2 OT | @ St. Louis Blues (1993–94) | 8–9–2 | T |
| 20 | November 23, 1993 | 4–6 | @ San Jose Sharks (1993–94) | 8–10–2 | L |
| 21 | November 24, 1993 | 5–4 OT | @ Vancouver Canucks (1993–94) | 9–10–2 | W |
| 22 | November 27, 1993 | 10–4 | Dallas Stars (1993–94) | 10–10–2 | W |
| 23 | November 28, 1993 | 4–1 | @ New York Islanders (1993–94) | 11–10–2 | W |

December: 9–3–1 (home: 7–0–1; road: 2–3–0)

| Game | Date | Score | Opponent | Record | Recap |
|---|---|---|---|---|---|
| 24 | December 1, 1993 | 3–5 | @ Hartford Whalers (1993–94) | 11–11–2 | L |
| 25 | December 3, 1993 | 8–1 | Ottawa Senators (1993–94) | 12–11–2 | W |
| 26 | December 5, 1993 | 4–6 | @ Winnipeg Jets (1993–94) | 12–12–2 | L |
| 27 | December 6, 1993 | 6–2 | Winnipeg Jets (1993–94) | 13–12–2 | W |
| 28 | December 9, 1993 | 3–2 | St. Louis Blues (1993–94) | 14–12–2 | W |
| 29 | December 11, 1993 | 5–3 | San Jose Sharks (1993–94) | 15–12–2 | W |
| 30 | December 14, 1993 | 5–2 | Mighty Ducks of Anaheim (1993–94) | 16–12–2 | W |
| 31 | December 17, 1993 | 6–4 | New York Rangers (1993–94) | 17–12–2 | W |
| 32 | December 18, 1993 | 1–8 | @ Montreal Canadiens (1993–94) | 17–13–2 | L |
| 33 | December 21, 1993 | 5–1 | Chicago Blackhawks (1993–94) | 18–13–2 | W |
| 34 | December 23, 1993 | 3–1 | @ Philadelphia Flyers (1993–94) | 19–13–2 | W |
| 35 | December 27, 1993 | 6–0 | @ Dallas Stars (1993–94) | 20–13–2 | W |
| 36 | December 31, 1993 | 4–4 OT | Los Angeles Kings (1993–94) | 20–13–3 | T |

January: 8–3–2 (home: 2–2–1; road: 6–1–1)

| Game | Date | Score | Opponent | Record | Recap |
|---|---|---|---|---|---|
| 37 | January 4, 1994 | 4–4 OT | @ St. Louis Blues (1993–94) | 20–13–4 | T |
| 38 | January 6, 1994 | 10–3 | @ San Jose Sharks (1993–94) | 21–13–4 | W |
| 39 | January 8, 1994 | 6–3 | @ Los Angeles Kings (1993–94) | 22–13–4 | W |
| 40 | January 10, 1994 | 6–4 | @ Mighty Ducks of Anaheim (1993–94) | 23–13–4 | W |
| 41 | January 12, 1994 | 2–4 | Tampa Bay Lightning (1993–94) | 23–14–4 | L |
| 42 | January 14, 1994 | 9–3 | Dallas Stars (1993–94) | 24–14–4 | W |
| 43 | January 15, 1994 | 3–2 | @ Boston Bruins (1993–94) | 25–14–4 | W |
| 44 | January 17, 1994 | 6–3 | @ Tampa Bay Lightning (1993–94) | 26–14–4 | W |
| 45 | January 19, 1994 | 4–4 OT | Mighty Ducks of Anaheim (1993–94) | 26–14–5 | T |
| 46 | January 25, 1994 | 0–5 | Chicago Blackhawks (1993–94) | 26–15–5 | L |
| 47 | January 27, 1994 | 4–3 OT | @ Chicago Blackhawks (1993–94) | 27–15–5 | W |
| 48 | January 29, 1994 | 7–1 | Winnipeg Jets (1993–94) | 28–15–5 | W |
| 49 | January 30, 1994 | 3–6 | @ Washington Capitals (1993–94) | 28–16–5 | L |

February: 9–4–0 (home: 5–3–0; road: 4–1–0)

| Game | Date | Score | Opponent | Record | Recap |
|---|---|---|---|---|---|
| 50 | February 2, 1994 | 3–1 | @ Tampa Bay Lightning (1993–94) | 29–16–5 | W |
| 51 | February 4, 1994 | 3–6 | Pittsburgh Penguins (1993–94) | 29–17–5 | L |
| 52 | February 5, 1994 | 4–3 | @ Toronto Maple Leafs (1993–94) | 30–17–5 | W |
| 53 | February 8, 1994 | 3–6 | Vancouver Canucks (1993–94) | 30–18–5 | L |
| 54 | February 11, 1994 | 6–3 | Philadelphia Flyers (1993–94) | 31–18–5 | W |
| 55 | February 12, 1994 | 5–4 OT | @ St. Louis Blues (1993–94) | 32–18–5 | W |
| 56 | February 15, 1994 | 4–5 OT | @ Toronto Maple Leafs (1993–94) | 32–19–5 | L |
| 57 | February 16, 1994 | 7–3 | Florida Panthers (1993–94) | 33–19–5 | W |
| 58 | February 18, 1994 | 5–1 | Edmonton Oilers (1993–94) | 34–19–5 | W |
| 59 | February 20, 1994 | 4–3 OT | @ Florida Panthers (1993–94) | 35–19–5 | W |
| 60 | February 23, 1994 | 2–7 | New Jersey Devils (1993–94) | 35–20–5 | L |
| 61 | February 24, 1994 | 3–0 | Hartford Whalers (1993–94) | 36–20–5 | W |
| 62 | February 26, 1994 | 2–0 | San Jose Sharks (1993–94) | 37–20–5 | W |

March: 7–7–1 (home: 4–4–1; road: 3–3–0)

| Game | Date | Score | Opponent | Record | Recap |
|---|---|---|---|---|---|
| 63 | March 1, 1994 | 5–2 | Calgary Flames (1993–94) | 38–20–5 | W |
| 64 | March 4, 1994 | 5–6 OT | Toronto Maple Leafs (1993–94) | 38–21–5 | L |
| 65 | March 6, 1994 | 2–3 | Buffalo Sabres (1993–94) | 38–22–5 | L |
| 66 | March 7, 1994 | 6–3 | @ New York Rangers (1993–94) | 39–22–5 | W |
| 67 | March 9, 1994 | 5–1 | @ Calgary Flames (1993–94) | 40–22–5 | W |
| 68 | March 11, 1994 | 2–4 | @ Edmonton Oilers (1993–94) | 40–23–5 | L |
| 69 | March 15, 1994 | 5–2 | Vancouver Canucks (1993–94) | 41–23–5 | W |
| 70 | March 17, 1994 | 1–3 | New York Islanders (1993–94) | 41–24–5 | L |
| 71 | March 19, 1994 | 2–4 | @ Winnipeg Jets (1993–94) | 41–25–5 | L |
| 72 | March 22, 1994 | 3–1 | Chicago Blackhawks (1993–94) | 42–25–5 | W |
| 73 | March 23, 1994 | 4–5 | @ Ottawa Senators (1993–94) | 42–26–5 | L |
| 74 | March 25, 1994 | 2–2 OT | Washington Capitals (1993–94) | 42–26–6 | T |
| 75 | March 27, 1994 | 3–1 | @ Chicago Blackhawks (1993–94) | 43–26–6 | W |
| 76 | March 29, 1994 | 6–2 | Hartford Whalers (1993–94) | 44–26–6 | W |
| 77 | March 31, 1994 | 2–4 | Quebec Nordiques (1993–94) | 44–27–6 | L |

April: 2–3–2 (home: 1–0–2; road: 1–3–0)

| Game | Date | Score | Opponent | Record | Recap |
|---|---|---|---|---|---|
| 78 | April 2, 1994 | 3–3 OT | Calgary Flames (1993–94) | 44–27–7 | T |
| 79 | April 3, 1994 | 3–3 OT | St. Louis Blues (1993–94) | 44–27–8 | T |
| 80 | April 5, 1994 | 8–3 | @ Vancouver Canucks (1993–94) | 45–27–8 | W |
| 81 | April 9, 1994 | 2–4 | @ Calgary Flames (1993–94) | 45–28–8 | L |
| 82 | April 10, 1994 | 3–4 | @ Edmonton Oilers (1993–94) | 45–29–8 | L |
| 83 | April 13, 1994 | 9–0 | Montreal Canadiens (1993–94) | 46–29–8 | W |
| 84 | April 14, 1994 | 3–4 | @ Dallas Stars (1993–94) | 46–30–8 | L |

Legend: W Win (2 points) L Loss (0 points) T Tie (1 point)

=== Playoffs ===
1994 Stanley Cup playoffs
Western Conference Quarterfinals vs. (8) San Jose Sharks: Sharks win 4–3

| Game | Date | Score | Opponent | Record | Recap |
|---|---|---|---|---|---|
| 1 | April 18, 1994 | 4–5 | San Jose Sharks | Sharks lead 1–0 | L |
| 2 | April 20, 1994 | 4–0 | San Jose Sharks | Series tied 1–1 | W |
| 3 | April 22, 1994 | 3–2 | @ San Jose Sharks | Red Wings lead 2–1 | W |
| 4 | April 23, 1994 | 3–4 | @ San Jose Sharks | Series tied 2–2 | L |
| 5 | April 26, 1994 | 4–6 | @ San Jose Sharks | Sharks lead 3–2 | L |
| 6 | April 28, 1994 | 7–1 | San Jose Sharks | Series tied 3–3 | W |
| 7 | April 30, 1994 | 2–3 | San Jose Sharks | Sharks win 4–3 | L |

Legend: W Win L Loss

== Player statistics ==
=== Regular season ===
Scoring

| Player | Pos | GP | G | A | Pts | PIM | +/- | PPG | SHG | GWG |
|---|---|---|---|---|---|---|---|---|---|---|
| Sergei Fedorov | C | 82 | 56 | 64 | 120 | 34 | 48 | 13 | 4 | 10 |
| Ray Sheppard | RW | 82 | 52 | 41 | 93 | 26 | 13 | 19 | 0 | 5 |
| Steve Yzerman | C | 58 | 24 | 58 | 82 | 36 | 11 | 7 | 3 | 3 |
| Paul Coffey | D | 80 | 14 | 63 | 77 | 106 | 28 | 5 | 0 | 3 |
| Vyacheslav Kozlov | LW | 77 | 34 | 39 | 73 | 50 | 27 | 8 | 2 | 6 |
| Keith Primeau | C | 78 | 31 | 42 | 73 | 173 | 34 | 7 | 3 | 4 |
| Dino Ciccarelli | RW | 66 | 28 | 29 | 57 | 73 | 10 | 12 | 0 | 1 |
| Nicklas Lidstrom | D | 84 | 10 | 46 | 56 | 26 | 43 | 4 | 0 | 3 |
| Steve Chiasson | D | 82 | 13 | 33 | 46 | 122 | 17 | 4 | 1 | 2 |
| Vladimir Konstantinov | D | 80 | 12 | 21 | 33 | 138 | 30 | 1 | 3 | 3 |
| Dallas Drake | RW | 47 | 10 | 22 | 32 | 37 | 5 | 0 | 1 | 2 |
| Mike Sillinger | C | 62 | 8 | 21 | 29 | 10 | 2 | 0 | 1 | 1 |
| Darren McCarty | RW | 67 | 9 | 17 | 26 | 181 | 12 | 0 | 0 | 2 |
| Mark Howe | D | 44 | 4 | 20 | 24 | 8 | 16 | 1 | 0 | 0 |
| Shawn Burr | LW/C | 51 | 10 | 12 | 22 | 31 | 12 | 0 | 1 | 1 |
| Bob Probert | LW | 66 | 7 | 10 | 17 | 275 | -1 | 1 | 0 | 0 |
| Greg Johnson | C | 52 | 6 | 11 | 17 | 22 | -7 | 1 | 1 | 0 |
| Martin Lapointe | RW | 50 | 8 | 8 | 16 | 55 | 7 | 2 | 0 | 0 |
| Sheldon Kennedy | RW | 61 | 6 | 7 | 13 | 30 | -2 | 0 | 1 | 0 |
| Kris Draper | C | 39 | 5 | 8 | 13 | 31 | 11 | 0 | 1 | 0 |
| Micah Aivazoff | C | 59 | 4 | 4 | 8 | 38 | -1 | 0 | 0 | 0 |
| Terry Carkner | D | 68 | 1 | 6 | 7 | 130 | 13 | 0 | 0 | 0 |
| Bob Halkidis | D | 28 | 1 | 4 | 5 | 93 | -1 | 0 | 0 | 0 |
| Jason York | D | 7 | 1 | 2 | 3 | 2 | 0 | 0 | 0 | 0 |
| Bob Essensa | G | 13 | 0 | 2 | 2 | 0 | 0 | 0 | 0 | 0 |
| Tim Taylor | C | 1 | 1 | 0 | 1 | 0 | -1 | 0 | 0 | 0 |
| Aaron Ward | D | 5 | 1 | 0 | 1 | 4 | 2 | 0 | 0 | 0 |
| Tim Cheveldae | G | 30 | 0 | 1 | 1 | 0 | 0 | 0 | 0 | 0 |
| Steve Maltais | LW | 4 | 0 | 1 | 1 | 0 | -1 | 0 | 0 | 0 |
| Sergei Bautin | D | 1 | 0 | 0 | 0 | 0 | 1 | 0 | 0 | 0 |
| Peter Ing | G | 3 | 0 | 0 | 0 | 0 | 0 | 0 | 0 | 0 |
| Steve Konroyd | D | 19 | 0 | 0 | 0 | 10 | 1 | 0 | 0 | 0 |
| Gord Kruppke | D | 9 | 0 | 0 | 0 | 12 | -4 | 0 | 0 | 0 |
| Chris Osgood | G | 41 | 0 | 0 | 0 | 2 | 0 | 0 | 0 | 0 |
| Mark Pederson | LW | 2 | 0 | 0 | 0 | 2 | -1 | 0 | 0 | 0 |
| Vincent Riendeau | G | 8 | 0 | 0 | 0 | 0 | 0 | 0 | 0 | 0 |

Goaltending

| Player | MIN | GP | W | L | T | GA | GAA | SO | SA | SV | SV% |
|---|---|---|---|---|---|---|---|---|---|---|---|
| Chris Osgood | 2206 | 41 | 23 | 8 | 5 | 105 | 2.86 | 2 | 999 | 894 | .895 |
| Tim Cheveldae | 1572 | 30 | 16 | 9 | 1 | 91 | 3.47 | 1 | 727 | 636 | .875 |
| Bob Essensa | 778 | 13 | 4 | 7 | 2 | 34 | 2.62 | 1 | 337 | 303 | .899 |
| Vincent Riendeau | 345 | 8 | 2 | 4 | 0 | 23 | 4.00 | 0 | 131 | 108 | .824 |
| Peter Ing | 170 | 3 | 1 | 2 | 0 | 15 | 5.29 | 0 | 102 | 87 | .853 |
| Team: | 5071 | 84 | 46 | 30 | 8 | 268 | 3.17 | 4 | 2296 | 2028 | .883 |

=== Playoffs ===
Scoring

| Player | Pos | GP | G | A | Pts | PIM | PPG | SHG | GWG |
|---|---|---|---|---|---|---|---|---|---|
| Sergei Fedorov | C | 7 | 1 | 7 | 8 | 6 | 0 | 0 | 0 |
| Dino Ciccarelli | RW | 7 | 5 | 2 | 7 | 14 | 1 | 0 | 0 |
| Vyacheslav Kozlov | LW | 7 | 2 | 5 | 7 | 12 | 0 | 0 | 0 |
| Paul Coffey | D | 7 | 1 | 6 | 7 | 8 | 0 | 0 | 0 |
| Nicklas Lidstrom | D | 7 | 3 | 2 | 5 | 0 | 1 | 1 | 0 |
| Steve Chiasson | D | 7 | 2 | 3 | 5 | 2 | 2 | 0 | 1 |
| Kris Draper | C | 7 | 2 | 2 | 4 | 4 | 0 | 1 | 0 |
| Greg Johnson | C | 7 | 2 | 2 | 4 | 2 | 1 | 0 | 0 |
| Darren McCarty | RW | 7 | 2 | 2 | 4 | 8 | 0 | 0 | 0 |
| Steve Yzerman | C | 3 | 1 | 3 | 4 | 0 | 0 | 0 | 0 |
| Ray Sheppard | RW | 7 | 2 | 1 | 3 | 4 | 0 | 0 | 0 |
| Sheldon Kennedy | RW | 7 | 1 | 2 | 3 | 0 | 0 | 0 | 0 |
| Shawn Burr | LW/C | 7 | 2 | 0 | 2 | 6 | 0 | 0 | 2 |
| Bob Probert | LW | 7 | 1 | 1 | 2 | 8 | 0 | 0 | 0 |
| Vladimir Konstantinov | D | 7 | 0 | 2 | 2 | 4 | 0 | 0 | 0 |
| Keith Primeau | C | 7 | 0 | 2 | 2 | 6 | 0 | 0 | 0 |
| Mark Howe | D | 6 | 0 | 1 | 1 | 0 | 0 | 0 | 0 |
| Terry Carkner | D | 7 | 0 | 0 | 0 | 4 | 0 | 0 | 0 |
| Bob Essensa | G | 2 | 0 | 0 | 0 | 0 | 0 | 0 | 0 |
| Bob Halkidis | D | 1 | 0 | 0 | 0 | 2 | 0 | 0 | 0 |
| Martin Lapointe | RW | 4 | 0 | 0 | 0 | 6 | 0 | 0 | 0 |
| Chris Osgood | G | 6 | 0 | 0 | 0 | 0 | 0 | 0 | 0 |

Goaltending

| Player | MIN | GP | W | L | GA | GAA | SO | SA | SV | SV% |
|---|---|---|---|---|---|---|---|---|---|---|
| Chris Osgood | 307 | 6 | 3 | 2 | 12 | 2.35 | 1 | 110 | 98 | .891 |
| Bob Essensa | 109 | 2 | 0 | 2 | 9 | 4.95 | 0 | 43 | 34 | .791 |
| Team: | 416 | 7 | 3 | 4 | 21 | 3.03 | 1 | 153 | 132 | .863 |

Note: GP = Games played; G = Goals; A = Assists; Pts = Points; +/- = Plus-minus PIM = Penalty minutes; PPG = Power-play goals; SHG = Short-handed goals; GWG = Game-winning goals;
MIN = Minutes played; W = Wins; L = Losses; T = Ties; GA = Goals against; GAA = Goals-against average; SO = Shutouts; SA=Shots against; SV=Shots saved; SV% = Save percentage;

== Draft picks ==
Detroit's draft picks at the 1993 NHL entry draft held at the Quebec Coliseum in Quebec City, Quebec.

| Round | # | Player | Nationality | College/Junior/Club team (League) |
|---|---|---|---|---|
| 1 | 22 | Anders Eriksson | Sweden | MODO (Sweden) |
| 2 | 48 | Jon Coleman | United States | Andover Academy (USHS-MA) |
| 3 | 74 | Kevin Hilton | United States | University of Michigan (CCHA) |
| 4 | 97 | John Jakopin | Canada | St. Michael's Buzzers (MetJHL) |
| 4 | 100 | Benoit Larose | Canada | Laval Titan (QMJHL) |
| 5 | 126 | Norm Maracle | Canada | Saskatoon Blades (WHL) |
| 6 | 152 | Tim Spitzig | Canada | Kitchener Rangers (OHL) |
| 7 | 178 | Yuri Yeresko | Russia | CSKA Moscow (Russia) |
| 8 | 204 | Vitezslav Skuta | Czech Republic | TJ Vitkovice (Czech Republic) |
| 9 | 230 | Ryan Shanahan | United States | Sudbury Wolves (OHL) |
| 10 | 256 | Jamie Kosecki | United States | Berkshire School (USHS-MA) |
| 11 | 282 | Gordy Hunt | United States | Detroit Compuware Ambassadors (NAHL) |
