= 1993–94 Dallas Stars season =

Ice hockey team season

1993–94 Dallas Stars
- Division: 3rd Central
- Conference: 4th Western
- 1993–94 record: 42–29–13
- Home record: 23–12–7
- Road record: 19–17–6
- Goals for: 286
- Goals against: 265

Team information
- General manager: Bob Gainey
- Coach: Bob Gainey
- Captain: Mark Tinordi
- Alternate captains: Neal Broten; Mike Modano
- Arena: Reunion Arena
- Average attendance: 16,070 (42 games)
- Minor league affiliates: Kalamazoo Wings; Dayton Bombers

Team leaders
- Goals: Mike Modano (50)
- Assists: Russ Courtnall (57)
- Points: Mike Modano (93)
- Penalty minutes: Shane Churla (333)
- Plus/minus: Derian Hatcher (+19)
- Wins: Andy Moog (24)
- Goals against average: Darcy Wakaluk (2.64)

The 1993–94 Dallas Stars season was the franchise's 27th season, and the team's first season in Dallas.

The Stars improved on their final season in Minnesota, finishing third in the Central Division with a record of 42 wins, 29 losses, and 13 ties for 97 points and returning to the playoffs after a one year absence, and earning a winning season for the first time since 1985-86. They swept the St. Louis Blues in the Conference Quarterfinals before losing the Conference Semifinals in five games to the Vancouver Canucks.

== Regular season ==
=== Season standings ===
Central Division
No.	CR		GP	W	L	T	GF	GA	Pts
1	1	**Detroit Red Wings**	84	46	30	8	356	275	100
2	2	**Toronto Maple Leafs**	84	43	29	12	280	243	98
3	4	**Dallas Stars**	84	42	29	13	286	265	97
4	5	**St. Louis Blues**	84	40	33	11	270	283	91
5	6	**Chicago Blackhawks**	84	39	36	9	254	240	87
6	12	Winnipeg Jets	84	24	51	9	245	344	57

Note: No. = Division rank, CR = Conference rank, W = Wins, L = Losses, T = Ties, GF = Goals For, GA = Goals Against, Pts = Points
Teams that qualified for the playoffs are highlighted in bold.

Western Conference
R		Div	GP	W	L	T	GF	GA	Pts
**1**	**y- Detroit Red Wings ***	**CEN**	**84**	**46**	**30**	**8**	**356**	**275**	**100**
**2**	**x- Calgary Flames ***	**PAC**	**84**	**42**	**29**	**13**	**302**	**256**	**97**
**3**	**Toronto Maple Leafs**	**CEN**	**84**	**43**	**29**	**12**	**280**	**243**	**98**
**4**	**Dallas Stars**	**CEN**	**84**	**42**	**29**	**13**	**286**	**265**	**97**
**5**	**St. Louis Blues**	**CEN**	**84**	**40**	**33**	**11**	**270**	**283**	**91**
**6**	**Chicago Blackhawks**	**CEN**	**84**	**39**	**36**	**9**	**254**	**240**	**87**
**7**	**Vancouver Canucks**	**PAC**	**84**	**41**	**40**	**3**	**279**	**276**	**85**
**8**	**San Jose Sharks**	**PAC**	**84**	**33**	**35**	**16**	**252**	**265**	**82**
9	Mighty Ducks of Anaheim	PAC	84	33	46	5	229	251	71
10	Los Angeles Kings	PAC	84	27	45	12	294	322	66
11	Edmonton Oilers	PAC	84	25	45	14	261	305	64
12	Winnipeg Jets	CEN	84	24	51	9	245	344	57

Divisions: CEN – Central, PAC – Pacific

bold – Qualified for playoffs; x – Won division; y – Won Conference (and division); * – Division leader

== Playoffs ==
The Stars managed to qualify for the playoffs for the first time since 1992 when they were known as the Minnesota North Stars. They swept St. Louis in the first round 4-0, but lost in the second round to Vancouver 4-1.

== Schedule and results ==
=== Regular season ===
1993–94 regular season
October: 6–4–2 (home: 3–1–2; road: 3–3–0)

Game	Date	Score	Opponent	Record	Recap
1	October 5, 1993	6–4	Detroit Red Wings (1993–94)	1–0–0	W
2	October 7, 1993	3–6	@ Toronto Maple Leafs (1993–94)	1–1–0	L
3	October 9, 1993	3–3 OT	Winnipeg Jets (1993–94)	1–1–1	T
4	October 12, 1993	3–3 OT	Chicago Blackhawks (1993–94)	1–1–2	T
5	October 16, 1993	4–0	St. Louis Blues (1993–94)	2–1–2	W
6	October 18, 1993	5–3	@ Chicago Blackhawks (1993–94)	3–1–2	W
7	October 20, 1993	2–5	@ Montreal Canadiens (1993–94)	3–2–2	L
8	October 21, 1993	6–5 OT	@ Ottawa Senators (1993–94)	4–2–2	W
9	October 23, 1993	2–3	@ Quebec Nordiques (1993–94)	4–3–2	L
10	October 25, 1993	5–3	@ Detroit Red Wings (1993–94)	5–3–2	W
11	October 27, 1993	5–1	Hartford Whalers (1993–94)	6–3–2	W
12	October 30, 1993	4–5 OT	Ottawa Senators (1993–94)	6–4–2	L

November: 6–5–4 (home: 4–0–3; road: 2–5–1)

Game	Date	Score	Opponent	Record	Recap
13	November 1, 1993	3–3 OT	Toronto Maple Leafs (1993–94)	6–4–3	T
14	November 3, 1993	4–5	@ Mighty Ducks of Anaheim (1993–94)	6–5–3	L
15	November 5, 1993	2–4	@ San Jose Sharks (1993–94)	6–6–3	L
16	November 7, 1993	1–1 OT	Winnipeg Jets (1993–94)	6–6–4	T
17	November 9, 1993	2–4	@ Mighty Ducks of Anaheim (1993–94)	6–7–4	L
18	November 11, 1993	4–0	San Jose Sharks (1993–94)	7–7–4	W
19	November 13, 1993	3–2	@ Winnipeg Jets (1993–94)	8–7–4	W
20	November 14, 1993	1–4	@ Chicago Blackhawks (1993–94)	8–8–4	L
21	November 17, 1993	4–3	Tampa Bay Lightning (1993–94)	9–8–4	W
22	November 20, 1993	4–3	Calgary Flames (1993–94)	10–8–4	W
23	November 21, 1993	7–4	Los Angeles Kings (1993–94)	11–8–4	W
24	November 24, 1993	2–2 OT	New York Islanders (1993–94)	11–8–5	T
25	November 27, 1993	4–10	@ Detroit Red Wings (1993–94)	11–9–5	L
26	November 29, 1993	6–5 OT	@ Edmonton Oilers (1993–94)	12–9–5	W
27	November 30, 1993	2–2 OT	@ Calgary Flames (1993–94)	12–9–6	T

December: 8–4–1 (home: 4–3–1; road: 4–1–0)

Game	Date	Score	Opponent	Record	Recap
28	December 4, 1993	3–4	@ St. Louis Blues (1993–94)	12–10–6	L
29	December 5, 1993	4–3	Edmonton Oilers (1993–94)	13–10–6	W
30	December 8, 1993	3–2	Pittsburgh Penguins (1993–94)	14–10–6	W
31	December 9, 1993	6–1	Ottawa Senators (1993–94)	15–10–6	W
32	December 12, 1993	4–4 OT	Florida Panthers (1993–94)	15–10–7	T
33	December 15, 1993	2–3	Chicago Blackhawks (1993–94)	15–11–7	L
34	December 17, 1993	2–3	Mighty Ducks of Anaheim (1993–94)	15–12–7	L
35	December 19, 1993	3–1	@ Vancouver Canucks (1993–94)	16–12–7	W
36	December 22, 1993	3–2 OT	@ Mighty Ducks of Anaheim (1993–94)	17–12–7	W
37	December 23, 1993	2–1	@ Los Angeles Kings (1993–94)	18–12–7	W
38	December 27, 1993	0–6	Detroit Red Wings (1993–94)	18–13–7	L
39	December 29, 1993	4–0	Toronto Maple Leafs (1993–94)	19–13–7	W
40	December 31, 1993	5–2	@ Chicago Blackhawks (1993–94)	20–13–7	W

January: 7–6–0 (home: 4–4–0; road: 3–2–0)

Game	Date	Score	Opponent	Record	Recap
41	January 2, 1994	4–6	Quebec Nordiques (1993–94)	20–14–7	L
42	January 4, 1994	1–2 OT	Chicago Blackhawks (1993–94)	20–15–7	L
43	January 6, 1994	8–0	Philadelphia Flyers (1993–94)	21–15–7	W
44	January 9, 1994	2–1	St. Louis Blues (1993–94)	22–15–7	W
45	January 11, 1994	5–2	Edmonton Oilers (1993–94)	23–15–7	W
46	January 13, 1994	3–4 OT	@ Toronto Maple Leafs (1993–94)	23–16–7	L
47	January 14, 1994	3–9	@ Detroit Red Wings (1993–94)	23–17–7	L
48	January 16, 1994	2–4	Buffalo Sabres (1993–94)	23–18–7	L
49	January 18, 1994	5–3	Los Angeles Kings (1993–94)	24–18–7	W
50	January 24, 1994	2–6	New Jersey Devils (1993–94)	24–19–7	L
51	January 26, 1994	3–2	@ Calgary Flames (1993–94)	25–19–7	W
52	January 27, 1994	3–2 OT	@ Vancouver Canucks (1993–94)	26–19–7	W
53	January 29, 1994	5–3	@ Edmonton Oilers (1993–94)	27–19–7	W

February: 7–2–1 (home: 3–2–0; road: 4–0–1)

Game	Date	Score	Opponent	Record	Recap
54	February 2, 1994	7–3	@ Winnipeg Jets (1993–94)	28–19–7	W
55	February 6, 1994	1–7	San Jose Sharks (1993–94)	28–20–7	L
56	February 9, 1994	4–2	Winnipeg Jets (1993–94)	29–20–7	W
57	February 12, 1994	9–3	@ Pittsburgh Penguins (1993–94)	30–20–7	W
58	February 13, 1994	5–3	@ Buffalo Sabres (1993–94)	31–20–7	W
59	February 16, 1994	0–3	Boston Bruins (1993–94)	31–21–7	L
60	February 18, 1994	4–2	Calgary Flames (1993–94)	32–21–7	W
61	February 21, 1994	6–3	@ San Jose Sharks (1993–94)	33–21–7	W
62	February 23, 1994	0–0 OT	@ Los Angeles Kings (1993–94)	33–21–8	T
63	February 26, 1994	3–1	New York Rangers (1993–94)	34–21–8	W

March: 5–5–4 (home: 3–1–1; road: 2–4–3)

Game	Date	Score	Opponent	Record	Recap
64	March 2, 1994	2–4	@ Winnipeg Jets (1993–94)	34–22–8	L
65	March 4, 1994	1–4	Vancouver Canucks (1993–94)	34–23–8	L
66	March 6, 1994	2–2 OT	Montreal Canadiens (1993–94)	34–23–9	T
67	March 8, 1994	4–3 OT	@ Philadelphia Flyers (1993–94)	35–23–9	W
68	March 9, 1994	2–4	@ Toronto Maple Leafs (1993–94)	35–24–9	L
69	March 12, 1994	2–2 OT	@ Hartford Whalers (1993–94)	35–24–10	T
70	March 13, 1994	0–4	@ New Jersey Devils (1993–94)	35–25–10	L
71	March 18, 1994	6–2	Washington Capitals (1993–94)	36–25–10	W
72	March 20, 1994	2–1 OT	Vancouver Canucks (1993–94)	37–25–10	W
73	March 22, 1994	4–3	Mighty Ducks of Anaheim (1993–94)	38–25–10	W
74	March 25, 1994	3–5	@ St. Louis Blues (1993–94)	38–26–10	L
75	March 27, 1994	2–2 OT	@ Tampa Bay Lightning (1993–94)	38–26–11	T
76	March 28, 1994	5–4	@ Florida Panthers (1993–94)	39–26–11	W
77	March 31, 1994	2–2 OT	@ Boston Bruins (1993–94)	39–26–12	T

April: 3–3–1 (home: 2–1–0; road: 1–2–1)

Game	Date	Score	Opponent	Record	Recap
78	April 1, 1994	0–3	@ New York Rangers (1993–94)	39–27–12	L
79	April 3, 1994	6–3	@ Washington Capitals (1993–94)	40–27–12	W
80	April 5, 1994	4–6	Toronto Maple Leafs (1993–94)	40–28–12	L
81	April 8, 1994	1–5	@ New York Islanders (1993–94)	40–29–12	L
82	April 10, 1994	2–2 OT	@ St. Louis Blues (1993–94)	40–29–13	T
83	April 12, 1994	9–5	St. Louis Blues (1993–94)	41–29–13	W
84	April 14, 1994	4–3	Detroit Red Wings (1993–94)	42–29–13	W

Legend: W Win (2 points) L Loss (0 points) T Tie (1 point)

=== Playoffs ===
1994 Stanley Cup playoffs
Western Conference Quarterfinals vs. (5) St. Louis Blues – Stars win 4–0

Game	Date	Score	Opponent	Series	Recap
1	April 17, 1994	5–3	St. Louis Blues	Stars lead 1–0	W
2	April 20, 1994	4–2	St. Louis Blues	Stars lead 2–0	W
3	April 22, 1994	5–4 OT	@ St. Louis Blues	Stars lead 3–0	W
4	April 24, 1994	2–1	@ St. Louis Blues	Stars win 4–0	W

Western Conference Semifinals vs. (7) Vancouver Canucks – Canucks win 4–1

Game	Date	Score	Opponent	Series	Recap
1	May 2, 1994	4–6	Vancouver Canucks	Canucks lead 1–0	L
2	May 4, 1994	0–3	Vancouver Canucks	Canucks lead 2–0	L
3	May 6, 1994	4–3	@ Vancouver Canucks	Canucks lead 2–1	W
4	May 8, 1994	1–2 OT	@ Vancouver Canucks	Canucks lead 3–1	L
5	May 10, 1994	2–4	Vancouver Canucks	Canucks win 4–1	L

Legend: W Win L Loss

== Player statistics ==
=== Regular season ===
Scoring

Player	Pos	GP	G	A	Pts	PIM	+/-	PPG	SHG	GWG
Mike Modano	C	76	50	43	93	54	-8	18	0	4
Russ Courtnall	RW	84	23	57	80	59	6	5	0	4
Dave Gagner	C	76	32	29	61	83	13	10	0	6
Ulf Dahlen	LW	65	19	38	57	10	-1	12	0	3
Neal Broten	C	79	17	35	52	62	10	2	1	1
Grant Ledyard	D	84	9	37	46	42	7	6	0	1
Paul Cavallini	D	74	11	33	44	82	13	6	0	3
Dean Evason	C	80	11	33	44	66	-12	3	2	2
Trent Klatt	RW	61	14	24	38	30	13	3	0	2
Mike Craig	RW	72	13	24	37	139	-14	3	0	2
Mike McPhee	LW	79	20	15	35	36	8	1	3	1
Brent Gilchrist	LW	76	17	14	31	31	0	3	1	5
Derian Hatcher	D	83	12	19	31	211	19	2	1	2
Paul Broten	RW	64	12	12	24	30	18	0	0	3
Mark Tinordi	D	61	6	18	24	143	6	1	0	0
Craig Ludwig	D	84	1	13	14	123	-1	1	0	0
Shane Churla	RW	69	6	7	13	333	-8	3	0	0
Dave Barr	RW	20	2	5	7	21	-6	0	0	0
Jim Johnson	D	53	0	7	7	51	-6	0	0	0
James Black	LW	13	2	3	5	2	-4	2	0	0
Jim McKenzie	LW	34	2	3	5	63	4	0	0	1
Jarkko Varvio	RW	8	2	3	5	4	1	0	0	1
Chris Tancill	C	12	1	3	4	8	-7	0	0	0
Pelle Eklund	C	5	2	1	3	2	-1	0	0	0
Richard Matvichuk	D	25	0	3	3	22	1	0	0	0
Tommy Sjodin	D	7	0	2	2	4	-1	0	0	0
Darcy Wakaluk	G	36	0	2	2	34	0	0	0	0
Alan May	RW	8	1	0	1	18	-1	0	0	1
Doug Zmolek	D	7	1	0	1	11	1	0	0	0
Neil Brady	C	5	0	1	1	21	-1	0	0	0
Gord Donnelly	D	18	0	1	1	66	-4	0	0	0
Mike Lalor	D	12	0	1	1	6	-5	0	0	0
Andy Moog	G	55	0	1	1	16	0	0	0	0
Brad Berry	D	8	0	0	0	12	-2	0	0	0
Rob Brown	RW	1	0	0	0	0	-1	0	0	0
Duane Joyce	D	3	0	0	0	0	0	0	0	0
Mike Needham	RW	5	0	0	0	0	-2	0	0	0
Derrick Smith	LW	1	0	0	0	0	-1	0	0	0

Goaltending

Player	MIN	GP	W	L	T	GA	GAA	SO	SA	SV	SV%
Andy Moog	3121	55	24	20	7	170	3.27	2	1604	1434	.894
Darcy Wakaluk	2000	36	18	9	6	88	2.64	3	978	890	.910
Team:	5121	84	42	29	13	258	3.02	5	2582	2324	.900

=== Playoffs ===
Scoring

Player	Pos	GP	G	A	Pts	PIM	+/-	PPG	SHG	GWG
Mike Modano	C	9	7	3	10	16	-2	2	0	2
Paul Cavallini	D	9	1	8	9	4	-4	1	0	1
Russ Courtnall	RW	9	1	8	9	0	-3	0	0	0
Dave Gagner	C	9	5	1	6	2	-3	3	0	0
Brent Gilchrist	LW	9	3	1	4	2	-3	1	0	0
Shane Churla	RW	9	1	3	4	35	1	1	0	0
Neal Broten	C	9	2	1	3	6	1	0	0	1
Trent Klatt	RW	9	2	1	3	4	-1	1	0	0
Mike McPhee	LW	9	2	1	3	2	0	0	0	0
Grant Ledyard	D	9	1	2	3	6	0	0	0	1
Pelle Eklund	C	9	0	3	3	4	-2	0	0	0
Craig Ludwig	D	9	0	3	3	8	3	0	0	0
Paul Broten	RW	9	1	1	2	2	0	0	0	0
Richard Matvichuk	D	7	1	1	2	12	-2	1	0	0
Dean Evason	C	9	0	2	2	12	1	0	0	0
Derian Hatcher	D	9	0	2	2	14	-2	0	0	0
Dave Barr	RW	3	0	1	1	4	1	0	0	0
Doug Zmolek	D	7	0	1	1	4	-2	0	0	0
Mike Craig	RW	4	0	0	0	2	-1	0	0	0
Mike Lalor	D	5	0	0	0	6	0	0	0	0
Alan May	RW	1	0	0	0	0	0	0	0	0
Andy Moog	G	4	0	0	0	0	0	0	0	0
Darcy Wakaluk	G	5	0	0	0	0	0	0	0	0

Goaltending

Player	MIN	GP	W	L	GA	GAA	SO	SA	SV	SV%
Darcy Wakaluk	307	5	4	1	15	2.93	0	168	153	.911
Andy Moog	246	4	1	3	12	2.93	0	121	109	.901
Team:	553	9	5	4	27	2.93	0	289	262	.907

Note: Pos = Position; GP = Games played; G = Goals; A = Assists; Pts = Points; +/- = plus/minus; PIM = Penalty minutes; PPG = Power-play goals; SHG = Short-handed goals; GWG = Game-winning goals
MIN = Minutes played; W = Wins; L = Losses; T = Ties; GA = Goals-against; GAA = Goals-against average; SO = Shutouts; SA = Shots against; SV = Shots saved; SV% = Save percentage;

== Draft picks ==
The Stars' picks at the 1993 NHL entry draft in Quebec City, Quebec.

Round	#	Player	Position	Nationality	College/Junior/Club team (League)
1	9	Todd Harvey	Center	Canada	Detroit Jr. Red Wings (OHL)
2	35	Jamie Langenbrunner	Center	United States	Cloquet High School (USHS–MN)
4	87	Chad Lang	Goaltender	Canada	Peterborough Petes (OHL)
6	136	Rick Mrozik	Defense	United States	Cloquet High School (USHS-MN)
6	139	Per Svartvadet	Center	Sweden	MODO (Sweden)
7	165	Jeremy Stasiuk	Right wing	Canada	Spokane Chiefs (WHL)
8	191	Rob Lurtsema	Wing	United States	Burnsville High School (USHS-MN)
10	243	Jordan Willis	Goaltender	Canada	London Knights (OHL)
10	249	Bill Lang	Center	Canada	North Bay Centennials (OHL)
11	269	Cory Peterson	Defense	United States	Bloomington Jefferson High School (USHS-MA)
S	9	Jacques Joubert	Center	United States	Boston University (Hockey East)
