= 1993–94 Buffalo Sabres season =

Ice hockey team season

1993–94 Buffalo Sabres
- Division: 4th Northeast
- Conference: 6th Eastern
- 1993–94 record: 43–32–9
- Home record: 22–17–3
- Road record: 21–15–6
- Goals for: 282
- Goals against: 218

Team information
- General manager: John Muckler
- Coach: John Muckler
- Captain: Pat LaFontaine; Alexander Mogilny (interim)
- Arena: Buffalo Memorial Auditorium
- Minor league affiliates: Rochester Americans; St. Thomas Wildcats

Team leaders
- Goals: Dale Hawerchuk (35)
- Assists: Dale Hawerchuk (51)
- Points: Dale Hawerchuk (86)
- Penalty minutes: Rob Ray (274)
- Plus/minus: Craig Muni (+28)
- Wins: Dominik Hasek (30)
- Goals against average: Dominik Hašek (1.95)

The 1993–94 Buffalo Sabres season was the Sabres' 24th season in the National Hockey League (NHL). The Sabres lost in the first round of the playoffs to the New Jersey Devils.

== Offseason ==
On July 30, head coach John Muckler was named general manager and Gerry Meehan was promoted to executive vice president for sports operations.

== Regular season ==
In the course of the regular season, the Sabres allowed the fewest goals (218) and tied the New York Rangers for most power-play goals with 96. They also tied the Boston Bruins and the Tampa Bay Lightning for the fewest power-play goals allowed (58), had the most shutouts (9) and the best penalty-kill percentage (84.74%)

=== Season standings ===
Northeast Division
No.	CR		GP	W	L	T	GF	GA	Pts
1	2	**Pittsburgh Penguins**	84	44	27	13	299	285	101
2	4	**Boston Bruins**	84	42	29	13	289	252	97
3	5	**Montreal Canadiens**	84	41	29	14	283	248	96
4	6	**Buffalo Sabres**	84	43	32	9	282	218	95
5	11	Quebec Nordiques	84	34	42	8	277	292	76
6	13	Hartford Whalers	84	27	48	9	227	288	63
7	14	Ottawa Senators	84	14	61	9	201	397	37

Note: No. = Division rank, CR = Conference rank, W = Wins, L = Losses, T = Ties, GF = Goals For, GA = Goals Against, Pts = Points
Teams that qualified for the playoffs are highlighted in bold.

Eastern Conference
R		GP	W	L	T	GF	GA	Pts
**1**	**p-New York Rangers ***	**84**	**52**	**24**	**8**	**299**	**231**	**112**
**2**	**x-Pittsburgh Penguins ***	**84**	**44**	**27**	**13**	**299**	**285**	**101**
**3**	**New Jersey Devils**	**84**	**47**	**25**	**12**	**306**	**220**	**106**
**4**	**Boston Bruins**	**84**	**42**	**29**	**13**	**289**	**252**	**97**
**5**	**Montreal Canadiens**	**84**	**41**	**29**	**14**	**283**	**248**	**96**
**6**	**Buffalo Sabres**	**84**	**43**	**32**	**9**	**282**	**218**	**95**
**7**	**Washington Capitals**	**84**	**39**	**35**	**10**	**277**	**263**	**88**
**8**	**New York Islanders**	**84**	**36**	**36**	**12**	**282**	**264**	**84**
9	Florida Panthers	84	33	34	17	233	233	83
10	Philadelphia Flyers	84	35	39	10	294	314	80
11	Quebec Nordiques	84	34	42	8	277	292	76
12	Tampa Bay Lightning	84	30	43	11	224	251	71
13	Hartford Whalers	84	27	48	9	227	288	63
14	Ottawa Senators	84	14	61	9	201	397	37

Final standings

bold – Qualified for playoffs; x – Won division; p – Won Presidents' Trophy (and division); * – Division leader

== Playoffs ==
On April 27, 1994, the Sabres played the New Jersey Devils in a classic playoff game when the Sabres outlasted the Devils 1–0 in a quadruple-overtime affair that required 70 saves from Hasek. Martin Brodeur, the Devils goalie went toe to toe with Dominik Hašek. Dave Hannan scored the lone, winning goal.

== Schedule and results ==
=== Regular season ===
1993–94 regular season
October: 4–7–1 (home: 0–4–0; road: 4–3–1)

Game	Date	Score	Opponent	Record	Recap
1	October 7, 1993	5–3	@ Boston Bruins (1993–94)	1–0–0	W
2	October 9, 1993	4–7	@ Montreal Canadiens (1993–94)	1–1–0	L
3	October 10, 1993	2–3	Hartford Whalers (1993–94)	1–2–0	L
4	October 12, 1993	3–5	@ Philadelphia Flyers (1993–94)	1–3–0	L
5	October 15, 1993	2–5	New York Rangers (1993–94)	1–4–0	L
6	October 16, 1993	3–4	@ Washington Capitals (1993–94)	1–5–0	L
7	October 18, 1993	4–6	Detroit Red Wings (1993–94)	1–6–0	L
8	October 22, 1993	2–4	Pittsburgh Penguins (1993–94)	1–7–0	L
9	October 23, 1993	3–3 OT	@ Hartford Whalers (1993–94)	1–7–1	T
10	October 27, 1993	5–3	@ Calgary Flames (1993–94)	2–7–1	W
11	October 29, 1993	6–3	@ Edmonton Oilers (1993–94)	3–7–1	W
12	October 30, 1993	6–3	@ Vancouver Canucks (1993–94)	4–7–1	W

November: 6–5–1 (home: 3–4–0; road: 3–1–1)

Game	Date	Score	Opponent	Record	Recap
13	November 3, 1993	2–6	Pittsburgh Penguins (1993–94)	4–8–1	L
14	November 7, 1993	3–4	Boston Bruins (1993–94)	4–9–1	L
15	November 10, 1993	3–5	Philadelphia Flyers (1993–94)	4–10–1	L
16	November 13, 1993	7–2	@ Philadelphia Flyers (1993–94)	5–10–1	W
17	November 17, 1993	0–4	@ New Jersey Devils (1993–94)	5–11–1	L
18	November 19, 1993	6–0	Winnipeg Jets (1993–94)	6–11–1	W
19	November 21, 1993	6–5	San Jose Sharks (1993–94)	7–11–1	W
20	November 22, 1993	5–2	@ Ottawa Senators (1993–94)	8–11–1	W
21	November 24, 1993	3–5	New Jersey Devils (1993–94)	8–12–1	L
22	November 26, 1993	5–2	Ottawa Senators (1993–94)	9–12–1	W
23	November 27, 1993	2–2 OT	@ Quebec Nordiques (1993–94)	9–12–2	T
24	November 29, 1993	3–0	@ Toronto Maple Leafs (1993–94)	10–12–2	W

December: 8–5–1 (home: 5–1–1; road: 3–4–0)

Game	Date	Score	Opponent	Record	Recap
25	December 1, 1993	3–0	@ Tampa Bay Lightning (1993–94)	11–12–2	W
26	December 2, 1993	1–2 OT	@ Florida Panthers (1993–94)	11–13–2	L
27	December 5, 1993	3–1	Boston Bruins (1993–94)	12–13–2	W
28	December 8, 1993	3–1	@ Ottawa Senators (1993–94)	13–13–2	W
29	December 10, 1993	6–2	Calgary Flames (1993–94)	14–13–2	W
30	December 11, 1993	3–0	@ Hartford Whalers (1993–94)	15–13–2	W
31	December 13, 1993	0–2	@ New York Rangers (1993–94)	15–14–2	L
32	December 16, 1993	1–2	@ Pittsburgh Penguins (1993–94)	15–15–2	L
33	December 17, 1993	2–0	Los Angeles Kings (1993–94)	16–15–2	W
34	December 19, 1993	3–3 OT	Tampa Bay Lightning (1993–94)	16–15–3	T
35	December 23, 1993	5–0	Montreal Canadiens (1993–94)	17–15–3	W
36	December 26, 1993	3–4 OT	@ New York Islanders (1993–94)	17–16–3	L
37	December 27, 1993	0–2	Philadelphia Flyers (1993–94)	17–17–3	L
38	December 31, 1993	4–1	New York Rangers (1993–94)	18–17–3	W

January: 5–5–2 (home: 2–2–2; road: 3–3–0)

Game	Date	Score	Opponent	Record	Recap
39	January 2, 1994	3–3 OT	Toronto Maple Leafs (1993–94)	18–17–4	T
40	January 7, 1994	3–4 OT	Pittsburgh Penguins (1993–94)	18–18–4	L
41	January 9, 1994	5–3	Vancouver Canucks (1993–94)	19–18–4	W
42	January 11, 1994	5–2	@ Chicago Blackhawks (1993–94)	20–18–4	W
43	January 12, 1994	2–3	@ Winnipeg Jets (1993–94)	20–19–4	L
44	January 15, 1994	1–2	@ St. Louis Blues (1993–94)	20–20–4	L
45	January 16, 1994	4–2	@ Dallas Stars (1993–94)	21–20–4	W
46	January 19, 1994	1–1 OT	Edmonton Oilers (1993–94)	21–20–5	T
47	January 24, 1994	0–4	@ Tampa Bay Lightning (1993–94)	21–21–5	L
48	January 27, 1994	7–2	Washington Capitals (1993–94)	22–21–5	W
49	January 29, 1994	3–2	@ Montreal Canadiens (1993–94)	23–21–5	W
50	January 30, 1994	2–3	Florida Panthers (1993–94)	23–22–5	L

February: 8–4–2 (home: 5–2–0; road: 3–2–2)

Game	Date	Score	Opponent	Record	Recap
51	February 2, 1994	3–2	@ New Jersey Devils (1993–94)	24–22–5	W
52	February 4, 1994	7–2	@ Florida Panthers (1993–94)	25–22–5	W
53	February 6, 1994	4–1	New York Islanders (1993–94)	26–22–5	W
54	February 8, 1994	1–3	@ New York Islanders (1993–94)	26–23–5	L
55	February 10, 1994	3–3 OT	@ Boston Bruins (1993–94)	26–23–6	T
56	February 11, 1994	5–1	Montreal Canadiens (1993–94)	27–23–6	W
57	February 13, 1994	3–5	Dallas Stars (1993–94)	27–24–6	L
58	February 16, 1994	5–3	@ Hartford Whalers (1993–94)	28–24–6	W
59	February 18, 1994	4–1	Florida Panthers (1993–94)	29–24–6	W
60	February 20, 1994	3–3 OT	@ Washington Capitals (1993–94)	29–24–7	T
61	February 21, 1994	2–1	Quebec Nordiques (1993–94)	30–24–7	W
62	February 23, 1994	4–2	Mighty Ducks of Anaheim (1993–94)	31–24–7	W
63	February 25, 1994	1–3	Chicago Blackhawks (1993–94)	31–25–7	L
64	February 26, 1994	3–4	@ Pittsburgh Penguins (1993–94)	31–26–7	L

March: 8–3–2 (home: 4–3–0; road: 4–0–2)

Game	Date	Score	Opponent	Record	Recap
65	March 2, 1994	7–2	@ Ottawa Senators (1993–94)	32–26–7	W
66	March 4, 1994	2–1	Pittsburgh Penguins (1993–94)	33–26–7	W
67	March 6, 1994	3–2	@ Detroit Red Wings (1993–94)	34–26–7	W
68	March 8, 1994	4–4 OT	@ San Jose Sharks (1993–94)	34–26–8	T
69	March 9, 1994	3–0	@ Mighty Ducks of Anaheim (1993–94)	35–26–8	W
70	March 12, 1994	5–3	@ Los Angeles Kings (1993–94)	36–26–8	W
71	March 17, 1994	1–6	New Jersey Devils (1993–94)	36–27–8	L
72	March 18, 1994	2–2 OT	@ New York Islanders (1993–94)	36–27–9	T
73	March 20, 1994	6–2	Ottawa Senators (1993–94)	37–27–9	W
74	March 23, 1994	2–3	St. Louis Blues (1993–94)	37–28–9	L
75	March 25, 1994	6–3	Hartford Whalers (1993–94)	38–28–9	W
76	March 27, 1994	4–1	New York Islanders (1993–94)	39–28–9	W
77	March 30, 1994	2–3 OT	Tampa Bay Lightning (1993–94)	39–29–9	L

April: 4–3–0 (home: 3–1–0; road: 1–2–0)

Game	Date	Score	Opponent	Record	Recap
78	April 1, 1994	5–0	Boston Bruins (1993–94)	40–29–9	W
79	April 2, 1994	6–2	@ Quebec Nordiques (1993–94)	41–29–9	W
80	April 4, 1994	4–6	@ Quebec Nordiques (1993–94)	41–30–9	L
81	April 8, 1994	1–0	Montreal Canadiens (1993–94)	42–30–9	W
82	April 10, 1994	4–1	Quebec Nordiques (1993–94)	43–30–9	W
83	April 12, 1994	2–3	@ New York Rangers (1993–94)	43–31–9	L
84	April 14, 1994	2–3	Washington Capitals (1993–94)	43–32–9	L

Legend: W Win (2 points) L Loss (0 points) T Tie (1 point)

=== Playoffs ===
1994 Stanley Cup playoffs
Eastern Conference Quarterfinals vs. (3) New Jersey Devils – Devils win 4–3

Game	Date	Score	Opponent	Series	Recap
1	April 17, 1994	2–0	@ New Jersey Devils	Sabres lead 1–0	W
2	April 19, 1994	1–2	@ New Jersey Devils	Series tied 1–1	L
3	April 21, 1994	1–2	New Jersey Devils	Devils lead 2–1	L
4	April 23, 1994	5–3	New Jersey Devils	Series tied 2–2	W
5	April 25, 1994	3–5	@ New Jersey Devils	Devils lead 3–2	L
6	April 27, 1994	1–0 4OT	New Jersey Devils	Series tied 3–3	W
7	April 29, 1994	1–2	@ New Jersey Devils	Devils win 4–3	L

Legend: W Win L Loss

== Player statistics ==
=== Scoring ===
- Position abbreviations: C = Center; D = Defense; G = Goaltender; LW = Left wing; RW = Right wing
- † = Joined team via a transaction (e.g., trade, waivers, signing) during the season. Stats reflect time with the Sabres only.
- ‡ = Left team via a transaction (e.g., trade, waivers, release) during the season. Stats reflect time with the Sabres only.

No.	Player	Pos	Regular season						Playoffs					
No.	Player	Pos	GP	G	A	Pts	+/-	PIM	GP	G	A	Pts	+/-	PIM
10	Dale Hawerchuk	C	81	35	51	86	10	91	7	0	7	7	−1	4
89	Alexander Mogilny	RW	66	32	47	79	8	22	7	4	2	6	1	6
28	Donald Audette	RW	77	29	30	59	2	41	7	0	1	1	−1	6
13	Yuri Khmylev	LW	72	27	31	58	13	49	7	3	1	4	−1	8
26	Derek Plante	C	77	21	35	56	4	24	7	1	0	1	1	0
27	Brad May	LW	84	18	27	45	−6	171	7	0	2	2	2	9
42	Richard Smehlik	D	84	14	27	41	22	69	7	0	2	2	−1	10
8	Doug Bodger	D	75	7	32	39	8	76	7	0	3	3	0	6
19	Randy Wood	LW	84	22	16	38	11	71	6	0	0	0	−2	0
18	Wayne Presley	RW	65	17	8	25	18	103	7	2	1	3	−1	14
20	Bob Sweeney	C	60	11	14	25	3	94	1	0	0	0	0	0
41	Ken Sutton	D	78	4	20	24	−6	71	4	0	0	0	2	2
14	Dave Hannan	C	83	6	15	21	10	53	7	1	0	1	1	6
16	Pat LaFontaine	C	16	5	13	18	−4	2	—	—	—	—	—	—
22	Craig Simpson	LW	22	8	8	16	−3	8	—	—	—	—	—	—
7	Petr Svoboda	D	60	2	14	16	11	89	3	0	0	0	−1	4
4	Philippe Boucher	D	38	6	8	14	−1	29	7	1	1	2	2	2
43	Jason Dawe	LW	32	6	7	13	1	12	6	0	1	1	1	6
24	Randy Moller	D	78	2	11	13	−5	154	7	0	2	2	2	8
5	Craig Muni†	D	73	2	8	10	28	62	7	0	0	0	1	4
32	Rob Ray	LW	82	3	4	7	2	274	7	1	0	1	1	43
36	Matthew Barnaby	LW	35	2	4	6	−7	106	3	0	0	0	2	17
21	Scott Thomas	RW	32	2	2	4	−6	8	—	—	—	—	—	—
6	Keith Carney‡	D	7	1	3	4	−1	4	—	—	—	—	—	—
31	Grant Fuhr	G	32	0	4	4		16	—	—	—	—	—	—
15	Sergei Petrenko	LW	14	0	4	4	−3	0	—	—	—	—	—	—
39	Dominik Hasek	G	58	0	3	3		6	7	0	0	0		2
17	Todd Simon	C	15	0	1	1	−3	0	5	1	0	1	1	0
33	Mark Astley	D	1	0	0	0	−1	0	—	—	—	—	—	—
40	James Black†	C	2	0	0	0	0	0	—	—	—	—	—	—
34	Gord Donnelly‡	D	7	0	0	0	1	31	—	—	—	—	—	—
44	Doug MacDonald	LW	4	0	0	0	−2	0	—	—	—	—	—	—
29	Denis Tsygurov	D	8	0	0	0	−1	8	—	—	—	—	—	—

=== Goaltending ===
No.	Player	Regular season										Playoffs								
No.	Player	GP	W	L	T	SA	GA	GAA	SV%	SO	TOI	GP	W	L	SA	GA	GAA	SV%	SO	TOI
39	Dominik Hasek	58	30	20	6	1552	109	1.95	.930	7	3358	7	3	4	261	13	1.61	.950	2	484
31	Grant Fuhr	32	13	12	3	907	106	3.69	.883	2	1726	—	—	—	—	—	—	—	—	—

== Awards and records ==
- Dominik Hašek, Nominee, Hart Memorial Trophy
- Dominik Hašek, William M. Jennings Trophy
- Dominik Hašek, Vezina Trophy
- Dominik Hašek, NHL First Team All-Star

== Draft picks ==
Buffalo's draft picks at the 1993 NHL entry draft held at the Quebec Coliseum in Quebec City, Quebec.

Round	#	Player	Nationality	College/Junior/Club team (League)
2	38	Denis Tsygurov	Russia	Lada Togliatti (Russia)
3	64	Ethan Philpott	United States	Andover Academy (USHS-MA)
5	116	Richard Safarik	Slovakia	AC Nitra (Slovakia)
6	142	Kevin Pozzo	Canada	Moose Jaw Warriors (WHL)
7	168	Sergei Petrenko	Ukraine	Dynamo Moscow (Russia)
8	194	Mike Barrie	Canada	Victoria Cougars (WHL)
9	220	Barrie Moore	Canada	Sudbury Wolves (OHL)
10	246	Chris Davis	Canada	Calgary Royals (AJHL)
11	272	Scott Nichol	Canada	Portland Winter Hawks (WHL)
