= 1993–94 Washington Capitals season =

Ice hockey team season

1993–94 Washington Capitals
- Division: 3rd Atlantic
- Conference: 7th Eastern
- 1993–94 record: 39–35–10
- Home record: 17–16–9
- Road record: 22–19–1
- Goals for: 277
- Goals against: 263

Team information
- General manager: David Poile
- Coach: Terry Murray (Oct.–Jan.); Jim Schoenfeld (Jan.–May)
- Captain: Kevin Hatcher
- Arena: USAir Arena
- Average attendance: 14,527
- Minor league affiliates: Portland Pirates; Hampton Roads Admirals

Team leaders
- Goals: Dmitri Khristich (29)
- Assists: Mike Ridley (44)
- Points: Mike Ridley (70)
- Penalty minutes: Craig Berube (305)
- Plus/minus: Sylvain Cote (+30)
- Wins: Don Beaupre (24)
- Goals against average: Don Beaupre (2.84)

The 1993–94 Washington Capitals season was the Capitals' 20th season of play.

Until 2018, this season was notable as the only time the Washington Capitals ever defeated the Pittsburgh Penguins in a playoff series, as the Capitals would lose to the Penguins in 1995, 1996, 2000, 2001, 2009, 2016, and 2017 before finally beating the Penguins in 2018 on their way to their first Stanley Cup.

== Regular season ==
On January 27, head coach Terry Murray was fired and replaced by Jim Schoenfeld.

=== Final standings ===
Atlantic Division
No.	CR		GP	W	L	T	GF	GA	Pts
1	1	**New York Rangers**	84	52	24	8	299	231	112
2	3	**New Jersey Devils**	84	47	25	12	306	220	106
3	7	**Washington Capitals**	84	39	35	10	277	263	88
4	8	**New York Islanders**	84	36	36	12	282	264	84
5	9	Florida Panthers	84	33	34	17	233	233	83
6	10	Philadelphia Flyers	84	35	39	10	294	314	80
7	12	Tampa Bay Lightning	84	30	43	11	224	251	71

Note: No. = Division rank, CR = Conference rank, W = Wins, L = Losses, T = Ties, GF = Goals For, GA = Goals Against, Pts = Points
Teams that qualified for the playoffs are highlighted in bold.

Eastern Conference
R		GP	W	L	T	GF	GA	Pts
**1**	**p-New York Rangers ***	**84**	**52**	**24**	**8**	**299**	**231**	**112**
**2**	**x-Pittsburgh Penguins ***	**84**	**44**	**27**	**13**	**299**	**285**	**101**
**3**	**New Jersey Devils**	**84**	**47**	**25**	**12**	**306**	**220**	**106**
**4**	**Boston Bruins**	**84**	**42**	**29**	**13**	**289**	**252**	**97**
**5**	**Montreal Canadiens**	**84**	**41**	**29**	**14**	**283**	**248**	**96**
**6**	**Buffalo Sabres**	**84**	**43**	**32**	**9**	**282**	**218**	**95**
**7**	**Washington Capitals**	**84**	**39**	**35**	**10**	**277**	**263**	**88**
**8**	**New York Islanders**	**84**	**36**	**36**	**12**	**282**	**264**	**84**
9	Florida Panthers	84	33	34	17	233	233	83
10	Philadelphia Flyers	84	35	39	10	294	314	80
11	Quebec Nordiques	84	34	42	8	277	292	76
12	Tampa Bay Lightning	84	30	43	11	224	251	71
13	Hartford Whalers	84	27	48	9	227	288	63
14	Ottawa Senators	84	14	61	9	201	397	37

Final standings

bold – Qualified for playoffs; x – Won division; p – Won Presidents' Trophy (and division); * – Division leader

== Schedule and results ==
=== Regular season ===
1993–94 regular season
October: 6–7–0 (home: 2–2–0; road: 4–5–0)

Game	Date	Score	Opponent	Record	Recap
1	October 6, 1993	4–6	@ Winnipeg Jets (1993–94)	0–1–0	L
2	October 8, 1993	3–6	New Jersey Devils (1993–94)	0–2–0	L
3	October 9, 1993	4–6	@ New Jersey Devils (1993–94)	0–3–0	L
4	October 11, 1993	2–5	@ New York Rangers (1993–94)	0–4–0	L
5	October 13, 1993	1–7	@ Toronto Maple Leafs (1993–94)	0–5–0	L
6	October 15, 1993	0–3	Philadelphia Flyers (1993–94)	0–6–0	L
7	October 16, 1993	4–3	Buffalo Sabres (1993–94)	1–6–0	W
8	October 22, 1993	6–3	Los Angeles Kings (1993–94)	2–6–0	W
9	October 24, 1993	3–2 OT	@ Edmonton Oilers (1993–94)	3–6–0	W
10	October 25, 1993	2–3 OT	@ Calgary Flames (1993–94)	3–7–0	L
11	October 27, 1993	4–2	@ Vancouver Canucks (1993–94)	4–7–0	W
12	October 29, 1993	5–2	@ Mighty Ducks of Anaheim (1993–94)	5–7–0	W
13	October 30, 1993	4–2	@ San Jose Sharks (1993–94)	6–7–0	W

November: 4–6–1 (home: 3–2–1; road: 1–4–0)

Game	Date	Score	Opponent	Record	Recap
14	November 5, 1993	3–2	Vancouver Canucks (1993–94)	7–7–0	W
15	November 9, 1993	2–1	Quebec Nordiques (1993–94)	8–7–0	W
16	November 11, 1993	4–1	@ Tampa Bay Lightning (1993–94)	9–7–0	W
17	November 13, 1993	0–2	New York Rangers (1993–94)	9–8–0	L
18	November 16, 1993	1–2	San Jose Sharks (1993–94)	9–9–0	L
19	November 18, 1993	2–3	@ Pittsburgh Penguins (1993–94)	9–10–0	L
20	November 20, 1993	3–4	@ Florida Panthers (1993–94)	9–11–0	L
21	November 24, 1993	5–2	St. Louis Blues (1993–94)	10–11–0	W
22	November 26, 1993	4–4 OT	Pittsburgh Penguins (1993–94)	10–11–1	T
23	November 28, 1993	1–3	@ New York Rangers (1993–94)	10–12–1	L
24	November 30, 1993	4–6	@ New York Islanders (1993–94)	10–13–1	L

December: 7–4–2 (home: 3–2–2; road: 4–2–0)

Game	Date	Score	Opponent	Record	Recap
25	December 3, 1993	2–2 OT	Montreal Canadiens (1993–94)	10–13–2	T
26	December 4, 1993	6–1	@ Ottawa Senators (1993–94)	11–13–2	W
27	December 7, 1993	1–6	Hartford Whalers (1993–94)	11–14–2	L
28	December 9, 1993	4–2	@ Philadelphia Flyers (1993–94)	12–14–2	W
29	December 11, 1993	5–3	@ Montreal Canadiens (1993–94)	13–14–2	W
30	December 13, 1993	3–5	@ Quebec Nordiques (1993–94)	13–15–2	L
31	December 17, 1993	11–2	Ottawa Senators (1993–94)	14–15–2	W
32	December 18, 1993	1–4	@ Hartford Whalers (1993–94)	14–16–2	L
33	December 21, 1993	4–1	@ Philadelphia Flyers (1993–94)	15–16–2	W
34	December 23, 1993	0–1	New York Rangers (1993–94)	15–17–2	L
35	December 26, 1993	7–3	Pittsburgh Penguins (1993–94)	16–17–2	W
36	December 28, 1993	3–3 OT	Florida Panthers (1993–94)	16–17–3	T
37	December 30, 1993	3–0	Mighty Ducks of Anaheim (1993–94)	17–17–3	W

January: 5–7–1 (home: 2–3–1; road: 3–4–0)

Game	Date	Score	Opponent	Record	Recap
38	January 1, 1994	5–5 OT	Tampa Bay Lightning (1993–94)	17–17–4	T
39	January 2, 1994	2–8	@ Boston Bruins (1993–94)	17–18–4	L
40	January 8, 1994	4–1	Chicago Blackhawks (1993–94)	18–18–4	W
41	January 9, 1994	4–0	@ New Jersey Devils (1993–94)	19–18–4	W
42	January 11, 1994	1–2	Toronto Maple Leafs (1993–94)	19–19–4	L
43	January 14, 1994	2–5	New Jersey Devils (1993–94)	19–20–4	L
44	January 15, 1994	4–0	@ Quebec Nordiques (1993–94)	20–20–4	W
45	January 17, 1994	1–3	@ Montreal Canadiens (1993–94)	20–21–4	L
46	January 19, 1994	1–5	@ Florida Panthers (1993–94)	20–22–4	L
47	January 25, 1994	1–3	Boston Bruins (1993–94)	20–23–4	L
48	January 27, 1994	2–7	@ Buffalo Sabres (1993–94)	20–24–4	L
49	January 29, 1994	4–2	@ Philadelphia Flyers (1993–94)	21–24–4	W
50	January 30, 1994	6–3	Detroit Red Wings (1993–94)	22–24–4	W

February: 9–2–2 (home: 3–1–2; road: 6–1–0)

Game	Date	Score	Opponent	Record	Recap
51	February 2, 1994	5–2	@ Philadelphia Flyers (1993–94)	23–24–4	W
52	February 4, 1994	0–4	Montreal Canadiens (1993–94)	23–25–4	L
53	February 5, 1994	6–3	Tampa Bay Lightning (1993–94)	24–25–4	W
54	February 7, 1994	4–1	@ New York Rangers (1993–94)	25–25–4	W
55	February 10, 1994	4–3	@ St. Louis Blues (1993–94)	26–25–4	W
56	February 12, 1994	6–1	@ Los Angeles Kings (1993–94)	27–25–4	W
57	February 15, 1994	2–2 OT	Edmonton Oilers (1993–94)	27–25–5	T
58	February 18, 1994	3–1	New York Islanders (1993–94)	28–25–5	W
59	February 20, 1994	3–3 OT	Buffalo Sabres (1993–94)	28–25–6	T
60	February 21, 1994	0–4	@ New York Islanders (1993–94)	28–26–6	L
61	February 24, 1994	2–1	@ Florida Panthers (1993–94)	29–26–6	W
62	February 26, 1994	4–2	Florida Panthers (1993–94)	30–26–6	W
63	February 27, 1994	3–1	@ Hartford Whalers (1993–94)	31–26–6	W

March: 4–6–4 (home: 1–4–3; road: 3–2–1)

Game	Date	Score	Opponent	Record	Recap
64	March 1, 1994	3–4	Tampa Bay Lightning (1993–94)	31–27–6	L
65	March 4, 1994	3–3 OT	Philadelphia Flyers (1993–94)	31–27–7	T
66	March 6, 1994	4–4 OT	Calgary Flames (1993–94)	31–27–8	T
67	March 7, 1994	3–6	@ Boston Bruins (1993–94)	31–28–8	L
68	March 9, 1994	5–7	New York Rangers (1993–94)	31–29–8	L
69	March 12, 1994	3–4	Quebec Nordiques (1993–94)	31–30–8	L
70	March 15, 1994	5–4 OT	@ Pittsburgh Penguins (1993–94)	32–30–8	W
71	March 18, 1994	2–6	@ Dallas Stars (1993–94)	32–31–8	L
72	March 20, 1994	3–0	@ Tampa Bay Lightning (1993–94)	33–31–8	W
73	March 22, 1994	4–1	Hartford Whalers (1993–94)	34–31–8	W
74	March 25, 1994	2–2 OT	@ Detroit Red Wings (1993–94)	34–31–9	T
75	March 27, 1994	4–6	Boston Bruins (1993–94)	34–32–9	L
76	March 29, 1994	2–2 OT	New York Islanders (1993–94)	34–32–10	T
77	March 31, 1994	6–3	@ Chicago Blackhawks (1993–94)	35–32–10	W

April: 4–3–0 (home: 3–2–0; road: 1–1–0)

Game	Date	Score	Opponent	Record	Recap
78	April 1, 1994	2–1	New Jersey Devils (1993–94)	36–32–10	W
79	April 3, 1994	3–6	Dallas Stars (1993–94)	36–33–10	L
80	April 5, 1994	3–4 OT	New York Islanders (1993–94)	36–34–10	L
81	April 6, 1994	5–6	@ Ottawa Senators (1993–94)	36–35–10	L
82	April 9, 1994	8–4	Ottawa Senators (1993–94)	37–35–10	W
83	April 12, 1994	4–3	Winnipeg Jets (1993–94)	38–35–10	W
84	April 14, 1994	3–2	@ Buffalo Sabres (1993–94)	39–35–10	W

Legend: W Win (2 points) L Loss (0 points) T Tie (1 point)

=== Playoffs ===
1994 Stanley Cup playoffs
Eastern Conference Quarterfinals vs. (2) Pittsburgh Penguins – Capitals win 4–2

Game	Date	Score	Opponent	Series	Recap
1	April 17, 1994	5–3	@ Pittsburgh Penguins	Capitals lead 1–0	W
2	April 19, 1994	1–2	@ Pittsburgh Penguins	Series tied 1–1	L
3	April 21, 1994	2–0	Pittsburgh Penguins	Capitals lead 2–1	W
4	April 23, 1994	4–1	Pittsburgh Penguins	Capitals lead 3–1	W
5	April 25, 1994	2–3	@ Pittsburgh Penguins	Capitals lead 3–2	L
6	April 27, 1994	6–3	Pittsburgh Penguins	Capitals win 4–2	W

Eastern Conference Semifinals vs. (1) New York Rangers – Rangers win 4–1

Game	Date	Score	Opponent	Series	Recap
1	May 1, 1994	3–6	@ New York Rangers	Rangers lead 1–0	L
2	May 3, 1994	2–5	@ New York Rangers	Rangers lead 2–0	L
3	May 5, 1994	0–3	New York Rangers	Rangers lead 3–0	L
4	May 7, 1994	4–2	New York Rangers	Rangers lead 3–1	W
5	May 9, 1994	3–4	@ New York Rangers	Rangers win 4–1	L

Legend: W Win L Loss

== Player statistics ==
=== Regular season ===
Scoring

Player	Pos	GP	G	A	Pts	PIM	+/-	PPG	SHG	GWG
Mike Ridley	C	81	26	44	70	24	15	10	2	4
Dmitri Khristich	LW/C	83	29	29	58	73	-2	10	0	4
Sylvain Cote	D	84	16	35	51	66	30	3	2	2
Michal Pivonka	C	82	14	36	50	38	2	5	0	4
Al Iafrate	D	67	10	35	45	143	10	4	0	3
Peter Bondra	RW	69	24	19	43	40	22	4	0	2
Randy Burridge	LW	78	25	17	42	73	-1	8	1	5
Calle Johansson	D	84	9	33	42	59	3	4	0	1
Kevin Hatcher	D	72	16	24	40	108	-13	6	0	3
Kelly Miller	LW	84	14	25	39	32	8	0	1	3
Dale Hunter	C	52	9	29	38	131	-4	1	0	1
Keith Jones	RW	68	16	19	35	149	4	5	0	1
Todd Krygier	LW	66	12	18	30	60	-4	0	1	3
Pat Peake	C	49	11	18	29	39	1	3	0	1
Steve Konowalchuk	LW	62	12	14	26	33	9	0	0	0
Dave Poulin	C	63	6	19	25	52	-1	0	1	0
John Slaney	D	47	7	9	16	27	3	3	0	1
Craig Berube	LW	84	7	7	14	305	-4	0	0	0
Joe Juneau	C	11	5	8	13	6	0	2	0	0
Alan May	RW	43	4	7	11	97	-2	0	0	0
Shawn Anderson	D	50	0	9	9	12	-1	0	0	0
Kevin Kaminski	C	13	0	5	5	87	2	0	0	0
Joe Reekie	D	12	0	5	5	29	7	0	0	0
Jason Woolley	D	10	1	2	3	4	2	0	0	0
Enrico Ciccone	D	46	1	1	2	174	-2	0	0	0
Pat Elynuik	RW	4	1	1	2	0	-3	1	0	0
Brian Curran	D	26	1	0	1	61	-2	0	0	0
Todd Nelson	D	2	1	0	1	2	1	1	0	1
Jason Allison	C	2	0	1	1	0	1	0	0	0
Don Beaupre	G	53	0	1	1	16	0	0	0	0
Keith Acton	C	6	0	0	0	21	-4	0	0	0
Tim Bergland	RW	3	0	0	0	4	-1	0	0	0
Byron Dafoe	G	5	0	0	0	0	0	0	0	0
Jim Johnson	D	8	0	0	0	12	-1	0	0	0
Olaf Kolzig	G	7	0	0	0	0	0	0	0	0
Rick Tabaracci	G	32	0	0	0	6	0	0	0	0

Goaltending

Player	MIN	GP	W	L	T	GA	GAA	SO	SA	SV	SV%
Don Beaupre	2853	53	24	16	8	135	2.84	2	1122	987	.880
Rick Tabaracci	1770	32	13	14	2	91	3.08	2	817	726	.889
Byron Dafoe	230	5	2	2	0	13	3.39	0	101	88	.871
Olaf Kolzig	224	7	0	3	0	20	5.36	0	128	108	.844
Team:	5077	84	39	35	10	259	3.06	4	2168	1909	.881

=== Playoffs ===
Scoring

Player	Pos	GP	G	A	Pts	PIM	PPG	SHG	GWG
Mike Ridley	C	11	4	6	10	6	0	0	0
Joe Juneau	C	11	4	5	9	6	2	0	1
Kelly Miller	LW	11	2	7	9	0	1	1	0
Sylvain Cote	D	9	1	8	9	6	0	0	0
Michal Pivonka	C	7	4	4	8	4	1	0	0
Kevin Hatcher	D	11	3	4	7	37	0	1	0
Peter Bondra	RW	9	2	4	6	4	0	0	1
Dmitri Khristich	LW/C	11	2	3	5	10	0	0	0
Dave Poulin	C	11	2	2	4	19	0	0	0
Calle Johansson	D	6	1	3	4	4	0	0	1
Joe Reekie	D	11	2	1	3	29	0	1	1
Dale Hunter	C	7	0	3	3	14	0	0	0
Todd Krygier	LW	5	2	0	2	10	0	0	0
John Slaney	D	11	1	1	2	2	1	0	0
Randy Burridge	LW	11	0	2	2	12	0	0	0
Shawn Anderson	D	8	1	0	1	12	0	0	0
Jason Woolley	D	4	1	0	1	4	0	0	1
Keith Jones	RW	11	0	1	1	36	0	0	0
Steve Konowalchuk	LW	11	0	1	1	10	0	0	0
Pat Peake	C	8	0	1	1	8	0	0	0
Don Beaupre	G	8	0	0	0	2	0	0	0
Craig Berube	LW	8	0	0	0	21	0	0	0
Byron Dafoe	G	2	0	0	0	0	0	0	0
Todd Nelson	D	4	0	0	0	0	0	0	0
Rick Tabaracci	G	2	0	0	0	0	0	0	0

Goaltending

Player	MIN	GP	W	L	GA	GAA	SO	SA	SV	SV%
Don Beaupre	429	8	5	2	21	2.94	1	191	170	.890
Byron Dafoe	118	2	0	2	5	2.54	0	39	34	.872
Rick Tabaracci	111	2	0	2	6	3.24	0	50	44	.880
Team:	658	11	5	6	32	2.92	1	280	248	.886

Note: GP = Games played; G = Goals; A = Assists; Pts = Points; +/- = Plus/minus; PIM = Penalty minutes; PPG=Power-play goals; SHG=Short-handed goals; GWG=Game-winning goals
MIN=Minutes played; W = Wins; L = Losses; T = Ties; GA = Goals against; GAA = Goals against average; SO = Shutouts; SA=Shots against; SV=Shots saved; SV% = Save percentage;

== Draft picks ==
Washington's draft picks at the 1993 NHL entry draft held at the Quebec Coliseum in Quebec City, Quebec.

Round	#	Player	Nationality	College/Junior/Club team (League)
1	11	Brendan Witt	Canada	Seattle Thunderbirds (WHL)
1	17	Jason Allison	Canada	London Knights (OHL)
3	69	Patrick Boileau	Canada	Laval Titan (QMJHL)
6	147	Frank Banham	Canada	Saskatoon Blades (WHL)
7	173	Dan Hendrickson	United States	St. Paul Vulcans (USHL)
7	174	Andrew Brunette	Canada	Hampton Roads Admirals (ECHL)
8	199	Joel Poirier	Canada	Sudbury Wolves (OHL)
9	225	Jason Gladney	Canada	Kitchener Rangers (OHL)
10	251	Marc Seliger	Germany	Starbulls Rosenheim (Germany)
11	277	Dany Bousquet	Canada	Penticton Panthers (BCJHL)

== See also ==
- 1993–94 NHL season
