= Larry DePalma =

American ice hockey player (born 1965)

- Born: October 27, 1965 (age 60) Trenton, Michigan, U.S.
- Height: 5 ft 11 in (180 cm)
- Weight: 200 lb (91 kg; 14 st 4 lb)
- Position: Left wing
- Shot: Left
- Played for: Pittsburgh Penguins; San Jose Sharks; Minnesota North Stars
- NHL draft: Undrafted
- Playing career: 1985–1997

Lawrence Edward DePalma (born October 27, 1965) is an American former professional ice hockey player who played for the Minnesota North Stars, San Jose Sharks and Pittsburgh Penguins of the National Hockey League. As a youth, he played in the 1978 Quebec International Pee-Wee Hockey Tournament with a minor ice hockey team from Detroit.

== Career statistics ==
| | | | Regular Season | | | | | Playoffs |
| Season | Team | League | GP | G | A | Pts | PIM | GP | G | A | Pts | PIM |
|---|---|---|---|---|---|---|---|---|---|---|---|---|
| 1984–85 | New Westminster Bruins | WHL | 65 | 14 | 16 | 30 | 87 | 10 | 1 | 1 | 2 | 25 |
| 1985–86 | Saskatoon Blades | WHL | 65 | 61 | 51 | 112 | 232 | 13 | 7 | 9 | 16 | 58 |
| 1985–86 | Minnesota North Stars | NHL | 1 | 0 | 0 | 0 | 0 | — | — | — | — | — |
| 1986–87 | Springfield Indians | AHL | 9 | 2 | 2 | 4 | 82 | — | — | — | — | — |
| 1986–87 | Minnesota North Stars | NHL | 56 | 9 | 6 | 15 | 219 | — | — | — | — | — |
| 1987–88 | Kalamazoo Wings | IHL | 22 | 6 | 11 | 17 | 215 | — | — | — | — | — |
| 1987–88 | Baltimore Skipjacks | AHL | 16 | 8 | 10 | 18 | 121 | — | — | — | — | — |
| 1987–88 | Minnesota North Stars | NHL | 7 | 1 | 1 | 2 | 15 | — | — | — | — | — |
| 1988–89 | Minnesota North Stars | NHL | 43 | 5 | 7 | 12 | 102 | 2 | 0 | 0 | 0 | 6 |
| 1989–90 | Kalamazoo Wings | IHL | 36 | 7 | 14 | 21 | 218 | 4 | 1 | 1 | 2 | 32 |
| 1990–91 | Kalamazoo Wings | IHL | 55 | 27 | 32 | 59 | 160 | 11 | 5 | 4 | 9 | 25 |
| 1990–91 | Minnesota North Stars | NHL | 14 | 3 | 0 | 3 | 26 | — | — | — | — | — |
| 1991–92 | Kansas City Blades | IHL | 62 | 28 | 29 | 57 | 188 | 15 | 7 | 13 | 20 | 34 |
| 1992–93 | Kansas City Blades | IHL | 30 | 11 | 11 | 22 | 83 | 10 | 1 | 4 | 5 | 20 |
| 1992–93 | San Jose Sharks | NHL | 20 | 2 | 6 | 8 | 41 | — | — | — | — | — |
| 1993–94 | Atlanta Knights | IHL | 21 | 10 | 10 | 20 | 109 | — | — | — | — | — |
| 1993–94 | Salt Lake Golden Eagles | IHL | 34 | 4 | 12 | 16 | 125 | — | — | — | — | — |
| 1993–94 | Las Vegas Thunder | IHL | 1 | 0 | 0 | 0 | 17 | — | — | — | — | — |
| 1993–94 | Cleveland Lumberjacks | IHL | 9 | 4 | 1 | 5 | 49 | — | — | — | — | — |
| 1993–94 | Pittsburgh Penguins | NHL | 7 | 1 | 0 | 1 | 5 | 1 | 0 | 0 | 0 | 0 |
| 1994–95 | Cleveland Lumberjacks | IHL | 25 | 6 | 6 | 12 | 113 | — | — | — | — | — |
| 1994–95 | San Diego Gulls | IHL | 38 | 14 | 8 | 22 | 86 | 2 | 0 | 0 | 0 | 20 |
| 1995–96 | Minnesota Moose | IHL | 55 | 9 | 17 | 26 | 173 | — | — | — | — | — |
| 1996–97 | Milwaukee Admirals | IHL | 68 | 13 | 13 | 26 | 131 | 3 | 0 | 1 | 1 | 4 |
| NHL totals | | | 148 | 21 | 20 | 41 | 408 | 3 | 0 | 0 | 0 | 6 |

== Awards ==
- WHL East Second All-Star Team – 1986
