= Steve Dubinsky =

Canadian ice hockey player

- Born: July 9, 1970 (age 55) Montreal, Quebec, Canada
- Height: 6 ft 0 in (183 cm)
- Weight: 190 lb (86 kg; 13 st 8 lb)
- Position: Centre
- Shot: Left
- Played for: Chicago Blackhawks; Calgary Flames; Nashville Predators; St. Louis Blues
- NHL draft: 226th overall, 1990; Chicago Blackhawks
- Playing career: 1993–2003

Steven Dubinsky (born July 9, 1970) is a Canadian former professional ice hockey player who played in the National Hockey League with the Chicago Blackhawks, Calgary Flames, Nashville Predators, and St. Louis Blues between 1993 and 2003. He played centre and shot left-handed.

== Biography ==
Dubinsky was born in Montreal, Quebec, Canada, and is Jewish. As a youth, he played in the 1982 and 1983 Quebec International Pee-Wee Hockey Tournaments with a minor ice hockey team from the North Shore of Montreal.

Dubinsky was drafted in the 11th round, 226th overall in the 1990 NHL entry draft. From there he played for Clarkson University, where he played right wing from 1989 to 1993 for the Clarkson Golden Knights men's ice hockey team, led the team in scoring his junior year, was named a 1992 Eastern College Athletic Conference (ECAC) All-Star honorable mention, and played with future NHLers Craig Conroy and Todd Marchant. After college Dubinsky reported to the Indianapolis Ice of the IHL where he played the majority of the 1993–1994 season before playing 28 games with the Blackhawks that same season.

Dubinsky bounced between the Ice and the Blackhawks before finally earning a full-time roster spot with the Blackhawks for the 1997–98 season. That year he played in all 82 games and scored a career high 18 points. The following season he played one game with the Blackhawks before being traded to the Calgary Flames. He played there for 2 years before rejoining the Blackhawks for the 2000–01 season. The 2001–02 season saw Dubinsky being traded yet again from the Blackhawks, this time to the Nashville Predators. Dubinsky then signed as a free agent with the St. Louis Blues for the 2002–03, but a head injury during the season limited him to only 28 games, and he retired following the season.

He currently works for Glacier Ice Arena in Vernon Hills, Illinois. His ex-wife's name is Sheryl, and they have three sons. His son Zach Dubinsky played college hockey at RPI, Michigan State, and Vermont, whereas his son Aiden currently plays college hockey at the University of Wisconsin-Madison.

== Career statistics ==
=== Regular season and playoffs ===
			Regular season					Playoffs
Season	Team	League	GP	G	A	Pts	PIM	GP	G	A	Pts	PIM
1989–90	Clarkson University	ECAC	35	7	10	17	24	—	—	—	—	—
1990–91	Clarkson University	ECAC	39	13	23	36	28	—	—	—	—	—
1991–92	Clarkson University	ECAC	33	21	34	55	40	—	—	—	—	—
1992–93	Clarkson University	ECAC	35	18	26	44	58	—	—	—	—	—
1993–94	Chicago Blackhawks	NHL	27	2	6	8	16	6	0	0	0	10
1993–94	Indianapolis Ice	IHL	54	15	25	40	63	—	—	—	—	—
1994–95	Chicago Blackhawks	NHL	16	0	0	0	8	—	—	—	—	—
1994–95	Indianapolis Ice	IHL	62	16	11	27	29	—	—	—	—	—
1995–96	Chicago Blackhawks	NHL	43	2	3	5	14	—	—	—	—	—
1995–96	Indianapolis Ice	IHL	16	8	8	16	10	—	—	—	—	—
1996–97	Chicago Blackhawks	NHL	5	0	0	0	0	4	1	0	1	4
1996–97	Indianapolis Ice	IHL	77	32	40	72	53	1	3	1	4	0
1997–98	Chicago Blackhawks	NHL	82	5	13	18	57	—	—	—	—	—
1998–99	Chicago Blackhawks	NHL	1	0	0	0	0	—	—	—	—	—
1998–99	Calgary Flames	NHL	61	4	10	14	14	—	—	—	—	—
1999–00	Calgary Flames	NHL	23	0	1	1	4	—	—	—	—	—
2000–01	Chicago Blackhawks	NHL	60	6	4	10	33	—	—	—	—	—
2000–01	Norfolk Admirals	AHL	14	6	5	11	4	—	—	—	—	—
2001–02	Chicago Blackhawks	NHL	3	1	0	1	4	—	—	—	—	—
2001–02	Norfolk Admirals	AHL	16	7	3	10	6	—	—	—	—	—
2001–02	Nashville Predators	NHL	26	5	2	7	10	—	—	—	—	—
2001–02	Milwaukee Admirals	AHL	36	13	13	26	16	—	—	—	—	—
2002–03	St. Louis Blues	NHL	28	0	6	6	4	—	—	—	—	—
2002–03	Worcester IceCats	AHL	6	1	5	6	4	—	—	—	—	—
NHL totals			375	25	45	70	164	10	1	0	1	14

== See also ==
- List of select Jewish ice hockey players
