= Ladislav Karabin =

Slovak ice hockey player

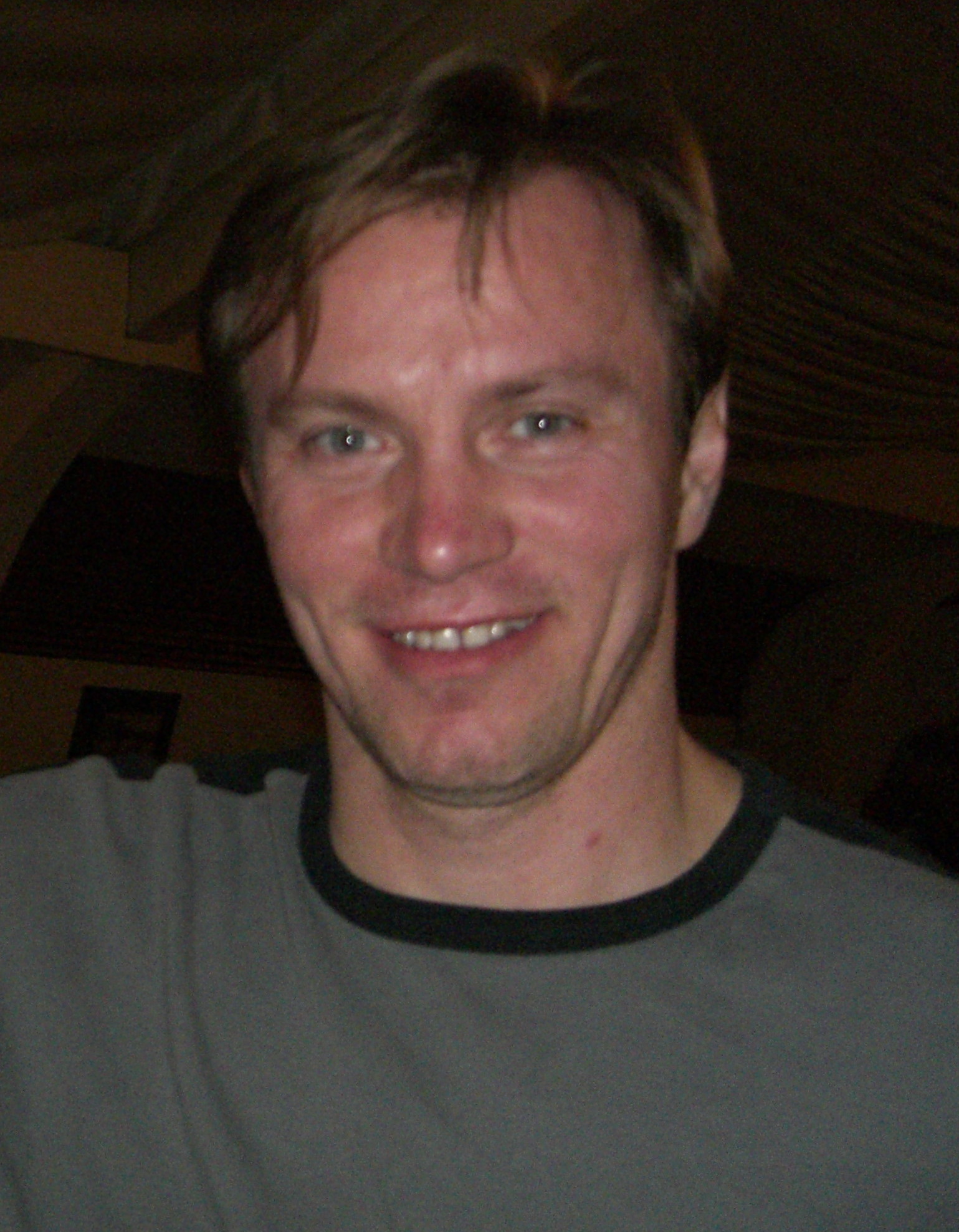
- Ladislav in 2006
- Born: February 16, 1970 (age 55) Bratislava, Czechoslovakia
- Height: 6 ft 1 in (185 cm)
- Weight: 189 lb (86 kg; 13 st 7 lb)
- Position: Left wing
- Shot: Left
- Played for: Iserlohn Roosters; Grizzly Adams Wolfsburg; SERC Wild Wings; Revier Löwen Oberhausen; HK Spisska Nova Ves; HC Slovan Bratislava; Pittsburgh Penguins
- NHL draft: 173rd overall, 1990; Pittsburgh Penguins
- Playing career: 1988–2006

Ladislav Karabin (born February 16, 1970) is a Slovak retired professional ice hockey player who played nine games in the National Hockey League with the Pittsburgh Penguins during the 1993–94 season. The rest of his career, which lasted from 1989 to 2006, was spent in European leagues.

== Personal life ==
Karabin resides in Fort Pierce, Florida with his wife Catherine, and their two daughters, Lacey and Saxon.

== Career statistics ==
=== Regular season and playoffs ===
			Regular season					Playoffs
Season	Team	League	GP	G	A	Pts	PIM	GP	G	A	Pts	PIM
1988–89	HC Slovan Bratislava	CSSR	31	7	2	9	10	—	—	—	—	—
1990–91	HC Slovan Bratislava	CSSR	49	21	7	28	57	—	—	—	—	—
1992–93	HC Slovan Bratislava	CSSR	39	21	23	44	0	—	—	—	—	—
1993–94	Pittsburgh Penguins	NHL	9	0	0	0	2	—	—	—	—	—
1993–94	Cleveland Lumberjacks	IHL	58	13	26	39	48	—	—	—	—	—
1994–95	Cleveland Lumberjacks	IHL	47	15	25	40	26	4	0	0	0	2
1995–96	Rochester Americans	AHL	21	3	5	8	18	—	—	—	—	—
1995–96	Los Angeles Ice Dogs	IHL	32	6	8	14	58	—	—	—	—	—
1996–97	HC Slovan Bratislava	SVK	33	4	10	14	—	—	—	—	—	—
1997–98	HK Spartak Dubnica	SVK-2	9	7	6	13	0	—	—	—	—	—
1997–98	HC Slovan Bratislava	SVK	6	0	0	0	0	—	—	—	—	—
1998–99	HK Spisska Nova Ves	SVK	47	25	28	53	70	1	0	0	0	50
1999–00	Revier Löwen	DEL	52	13	12	25	28	—	—	—	—	—
2000–01	Revier Löwen	DEL	48	11	20	31	82	3	2	1	3	2
2001–02	Revier Löwen	DEL	58	12	36	48	100	—	—	—	—	—
2002–03	SERC Wild Wings	DEL	17	1	5	6	28	—	—	—	—	—
2003–04	EHC Wolfsburg	GER-2	39	19	21	40	112	11	5	5	10	45
2004–05	Wolfsburg Grizzly Adams	DEL	47	11	28	39	58	—	—	—	—	—
2005–06	Iserlohn Roosters	DEL	32	3	13	16	75	—	—	—	—	—
DEL totals			254	51	114	165	371	13	4	6	10	8
NHL totals			9	0	0	0	2	—	—	—	—	—

=== International ===
Year	Team	Event	GP	G	A	Pts	PIM
1988	Czechoslovakia	EJC	6	1	4	5	12
1990	Czechoslovakia	WJC	6	2	1	3	6
Junior totals			12	3	5	8	18
