= 1993–94 Los Angeles Kings season =

Ice hockey team season

1993–94 Los Angeles Kings
- Division: 5th Pacific
- Conference: 10th Western
- 1993–94 record: 27–45–12
- Home record: 18–19–5
- Road record: 9–26–7
- Goals for: 294
- Goals against: 322

Team information
- General manager: Nick Beverley
- Coach: Barry Melrose
- Captain: Wayne Gretzky
- Alternate captains: Tony Granato; Dave Taylor
- Arena: Great Western Forum
- Minor league affiliates: Phoenix Roadrunners; Muskegon Fury

Team leaders
- Goals: Luc Robitaille (44)
- Assists: Wayne Gretzky (92)
- Points: Wayne Gretzky (130)
- Penalty minutes: Warren Rychel (322)
- Plus/minus: John Druce (+16)
- Wins: Kelly Hrudey (22)
- Goals against average: Robb Stauber (3.41)

The 1993–94 Los Angeles Kings season was the Kings' 27th season in the National Hockey League (NHL). The team finished in fifth place in the Pacific Division with a record of 27–45–12 for 66 points and missed the playoffs for the first time since 1986. The Kings played their home games at the Great Western Forum in Inglewood.

This season saw Kings captain Wayne Gretzky become the NHL's all-time leading goal scorer. He also won his 10th and final Art Ross Trophy as the league's leading scorer with 130 points. Despite Gretzky's achievements, the defending conference champion Kings regressed on the ice. They finished in 10th place in the newly-rebranded Western Conference, 16 points behind the San Jose Sharks, who clinched the eighth and final playoff spot. Notably, the Kings also finished five points behind their new local rivals, the Mighty Ducks of Anaheim, who were then in their first year of existence.

== Regular season ==
=== Wayne Gretzky's goal scoring record ===
- March 20, 1994 – At 19:11 of the third period in a game against the San Jose Sharks, Gretzky scored the 801st goal of his career, tying the NHL's career goals record held by his idol, Gordie Howe. Gretzky jammed a rebound past San Jose goaltender Artūrs Irbe after a shot by Los Angeles defenceman Alexei Zhitnik had glanced off Irbe. The goal was the second of the game for Gretzky, who had earlier scored at 6:16 of the first period by stealing the puck from Sharks defenceman Sandis Ozoliņš and backhanding it through Irbe's legs. The record-tying goal, scored after the Kings had pulled their own goaltender, Kelly Hrudey, for an extra attacker, tied the game at 6-6. The game ended as a tie with the same score.
- March 23, 1994 – At 14:47 of the second period in a game against the Vancouver Canucks, Gretzky scored the 802nd goal of his career against Canucks goaltender Kirk McLean to break Howe's career NHL goals record. The goal came on a Kings power play, with Marty McSorley and Luc Robitaille picking up assists. Robitaille had started the play during a rush toward the Vancouver net with a drop pass to Gretzky, who passed across the ice to McSorley; McSorley fed the puck back to Gretzky, who shot the puck into an almost empty net. Gretzky's teammates poured onto the ice to congratulate him, and the game was halted for a ceremony to honour both Gretzky and Howe. Unfortunately for the Kings, the record-breaking goal came in a losing effort, as Vancouver defeated Los Angeles, 6-3.

=== Final standings ===
Pacific Division
No.	CR		GP	W	L	T	GF	GA	Pts
1	3	**Calgary Flames**	84	42	29	13	302	256	97
2	7	**Vancouver Canucks**	84	41	40	3	279	276	85
3	8	**San Jose Sharks**	84	33	35	16	252	265	82
4	9	Mighty Ducks of Anaheim	84	33	46	5	229	251	71
5	10	Los Angeles Kings	84	27	45	12	294	322	66
6	11	Edmonton Oilers	84	25	45	14	261	305	64

Note: No. = Division rank, CR = Conference rank, W = Wins, L = Losses, T = Ties, GF = Goals For, GA = Goals Against, Pts = Points
Teams that qualified for the playoffs are highlighted in bold.

Western Conference
R		Div	GP	W	L	T	GF	GA	Pts
**1**	**y- Detroit Red Wings ***	**CEN**	**84**	**46**	**30**	**8**	**356**	**275**	**100**
**2**	**x- Calgary Flames ***	**PAC**	**84**	**42**	**29**	**13**	**302**	**256**	**97**
**3**	**Toronto Maple Leafs**	**CEN**	**84**	**43**	**29**	**12**	**280**	**243**	**98**
**4**	**Dallas Stars**	**CEN**	**84**	**42**	**29**	**13**	**286**	**265**	**97**
**5**	**St. Louis Blues**	**CEN**	**84**	**40**	**33**	**11**	**270**	**283**	**91**
**6**	**Chicago Blackhawks**	**CEN**	**84**	**39**	**36**	**9**	**254**	**240**	**87**
**7**	**Vancouver Canucks**	**PAC**	**84**	**41**	**40**	**3**	**279**	**276**	**85**
**8**	**San Jose Sharks**	**PAC**	**84**	**33**	**35**	**16**	**252**	**265**	**82**
9	Mighty Ducks of Anaheim	PAC	84	33	46	5	229	251	71
10	Los Angeles Kings	PAC	84	27	45	12	294	322	66
11	Edmonton Oilers	PAC	84	25	45	14	261	305	64
12	Winnipeg Jets	CEN	84	24	51	9	245	344	57

Divisions: CEN – Central, PAC – Pacific

bold – Qualified for playoffs; x – Won division; y – Won Conference (and division); * – Division leader

== Schedule and results ==
1993–94 regular season
October: 6–5–2 (home: 4–1–1; road: 2–4–1)

Game	Date	Score	Opponent	Record	Recap
1	October 6, 1993	2–5	Vancouver Canucks (1993–94)	0–1–0	L
2	October 9, 1993	10–3	Detroit Red Wings (1993–94)	1–1–0	W
3	October 10, 1993	5–2	San Jose Sharks (1993–94)	2–1–0	W
4	October 12, 1993	7–5	New York Islanders (1993–94)	3–1–0	W
5	October 14, 1993	4–4 OT	Edmonton Oilers (1993–94)	3–1–1	T
6	October 16, 1993	8–4	Calgary Flames (1993–94)	4–1–1	W
7	October 19, 1993	2–2 OT	@ Florida Panthers (1993–94)	4–1–2	T
8	October 20, 1993	4–3	@ Tampa Bay Lightning (1993–94)	5–1–2	W
9	October 22, 1993	3–6	@ Washington Capitals (1993–94)	5–2–2	L
10	October 24, 1993	2–3	@ New York Rangers (1993–94)	5–3–2	L
11	October 26, 1993	0–7	@ New York Islanders (1993–94)	5–4–2	L
12	October 27, 1993	3–8	@ Detroit Red Wings (1993–94)	5–5–2	L
13	October 29, 1993	4–3 OT	@ Winnipeg Jets (1993–94)	6–5–2	W

November: 3–8–0 (home: 3–2–0; road: 0–6–0)

Game	Date	Score	Opponent	Record	Recap
14	November 3, 1993	3–2	New Jersey Devils (1993–94)	7–5–2	W
15	November 6, 1993	8–3	Pittsburgh Penguins (1993–94)	8–5–2	W
16	November 9, 1993	2–3	@ Calgary Flames (1993–94)	8–6–2	L
17	November 10, 1993	0–4	@ Vancouver Canucks (1993–94)	8–7–2	L
18	November 13, 1993	6–3	St. Louis Blues (1993–94)	9–7–2	W
19	November 18, 1993	2–3	Toronto Maple Leafs (1993–94)	9–8–2	L
20	November 20, 1993	1–4	@ St. Louis Blues (1993–94)	9–9–2	L
21	November 21, 1993	4–7	@ Dallas Stars (1993–94)	9–10–2	L
22	November 25, 1993	6–8	@ Quebec Nordiques (1993–94)	9–11–2	L
23	November 27, 1993	0–4	@ Montreal Canadiens (1993–94)	9–12–2	L
24	November 30, 1993	6–8	Winnipeg Jets (1993–94)	9–13–2	L

December: 5–7–1 (home: 3–3–0; road: 2–4–1)

Game	Date	Score	Opponent	Record	Recap
25	December 2, 1993	3–2	Mighty Ducks of Anaheim (1993–94)	10–13–2	W
26	December 4, 1993	4–5	Tampa Bay Lightning (1993–94)	10–14–2	L
27	December 8, 1993	5–6	Florida Panthers (1993–94)	10–15–2	L
28	December 11, 1993	9–1	St. Louis Blues (1993–94)	11–15–2	W
29	December 13, 1993	2–5	@ Ottawa Senators (1993–94)	11–16–2	L
30	December 14, 1993	2–4	@ Pittsburgh Penguins (1993–94)	11–17–2	L
31	December 17, 1993	0–2	@ Buffalo Sabres (1993–94)	11–18–2	L
32	December 18, 1993	1–4	@ Toronto Maple Leafs (1993–94)	11–19–2	L
33	December 20, 1993	5–4 OT	@ Calgary Flames (1993–94)	12–19–2	W
34	December 23, 1993	1–2	Dallas Stars (1993–94)	12–20–2	L
35	December 26, 1993	3–2	@ Mighty Ducks of Anaheim (1993–94)	13–20–2	W
36	December 28, 1993	6–5	Vancouver Canucks (1993–94)	14–20–2	W
37	December 31, 1993	4–4 OT	@ Detroit Red Wings (1993–94)	14–20–3	T

January: 5–5–3 (home: 3–2–1; road: 2–3–2)

Game	Date	Score	Opponent	Record	Recap
38	January 1, 1994	7–4	@ Toronto Maple Leafs (1993–94)	15–20–3	W
39	January 4, 1994	5–1	Quebec Nordiques (1993–94)	16–20–3	W
40	January 8, 1994	3–6	Detroit Red Wings (1993–94)	16–21–3	L
41	January 11, 1994	2–2 OT	@ San Jose Sharks (1993–94)	16–21–4	T
42	January 12, 1994	6–4	Hartford Whalers (1993–94)	17–21–4	W
43	January 15, 1994	5–3	@ New Jersey Devils (1993–94)	18–21–4	W
44	January 16, 1994	2–5	@ Philadelphia Flyers (1993–94)	18–22–4	L
45	January 18, 1994	3–5	@ Dallas Stars (1993–94)	18–23–4	L
46	January 24, 1994	3–3 OT	@ Calgary Flames (1993–94)	18–23–5	T
47	January 25, 1994	4–4 OT	Winnipeg Jets (1993–94)	18–23–6	T
48	January 27, 1994	4–5 OT	New York Rangers (1993–94)	18–24–6	L
49	January 29, 1994	5–1	Mighty Ducks of Anaheim (1993–94)	19–24–6	W
50	January 31, 1994	1–3	@ Vancouver Canucks (1993–94)	19–25–6	L

February: 2–8–3 (home: 1–5–2; road: 1–3–1)

Game	Date	Score	Opponent	Record	Recap
51	February 2, 1994	4–6	@ Edmonton Oilers (1993–94)	19–26–6	L
52	February 5, 1994	4–5 OT	Calgary Flames (1993–94)	19–27–6	L
53	February 9, 1994	4–2	Chicago Blackhawks (1993–94)	20–27–6	W
54	February 11, 1994	5–3	@ Mighty Ducks of Anaheim (1993–94)	21–27–6	W
55	February 12, 1994	1–6	Washington Capitals (1993–94)	21–28–6	L
56	February 14, 1994	2–3 OT	Boston Bruins (1993–94)	21–29–6	L
57	February 18, 1994	3–4	Philadelphia Flyers (1993–94)	21–30–6	L
58	February 19, 1994	3–4	@ San Jose Sharks (1993–94)	21–31–6	L
59	February 21, 1994	4–6	Toronto Maple Leafs (1993–94)	21–32–6	L
60	February 23, 1994	0–0 OT	Dallas Stars (1993–94)	21–32–7	T
61	February 25, 1994	5–5 OT	@ Edmonton Oilers (1993–94)	21–32–8	T
62	February 26, 1994	2–4	@ Calgary Flames (1993–94)	21–33–8	L
63	February 28, 1994	3–3 OT	Montreal Canadiens (1993–94)	21–33–9	T

March: 4–7–2 (home: 2–4–0; road: 2–3–2)

Game	Date	Score	Opponent	Record	Recap
64	March 2, 1994	4–1	@ Hartford Whalers (1993–94)	22–33–9	W
65	March 3, 1994	4–6	@ Boston Bruins (1993–94)	22–34–9	L
66	March 6, 1994	3–3 OT	@ Chicago Blackhawks (1993–94)	22–34–10	T
67	March 9, 1994	0–4	Chicago Blackhawks (1993–94)	22–35–10	L
68	March 12, 1994	3–5	Buffalo Sabres (1993–94)	22–36–10	L
69	March 15, 1994	7–0	Ottawa Senators (1993–94)	23–36–10	W
70	March 16, 1994	2–5	@ Mighty Ducks of Anaheim (1993–94)	23–37–10	L
71	March 19, 1994	2–1	San Jose Sharks (1993–94)	24–37–10	W
72	March 20, 1994	6–6 OT	@ San Jose Sharks (1993–94)	24–37–11	T
73	March 23, 1994	3–6	Vancouver Canucks (1993–94)	24–38–11	L
74	March 25, 1994	4–3 OT	@ Edmonton Oilers (1993–94)	25–38–11	W
75	March 27, 1994	3–4	@ Vancouver Canucks (1993–94)	25–39–11	L
76	March 30, 1994	2–5	Mighty Ducks of Anaheim (1993–94)	25–40–11	L

April: 2–5–1 (home: 2–2–1; road: 0–3–0)

Game	Date	Score	Opponent	Record	Recap
77	April 2, 1994	3–5	Edmonton Oilers (1993–94)	25–41–11	L
78	April 3, 1994	6–1	Edmonton Oilers (1993–94)	26–41–11	W
79	April 5, 1994	1–2	San Jose Sharks (1993–94)	26–42–11	L
80	April 7, 1994	2–6	@ St. Louis Blues (1993–94)	26–43–11	L
81	April 9, 1994	3–4	@ Winnipeg Jets (1993–94)	26–44–11	L
82	April 10, 1994	1–2	@ Chicago Blackhawks (1993–94)	26–45–11	L
83	April 13, 1994	6–4	Calgary Flames (1993–94)	27–45–11	W
84	April 14, 1994	2–2 OT	Edmonton Oilers (1993–94)	27–45–12	T

Legend: W Win (2 points) L Loss (0 points) T Tie (1 point)

== Player statistics ==
=== Regular season ===
Scoring

Player	GP	G	A	Pts	PIM
Wayne Gretzky	81	38	92	130	20
Luc Robitaille	83	44	42	86	86
Jari Kurri	81	31	46	77	48
Rob Blake	84	20	48	68	137
Alexei Zhitnik	81	12	40	52	101
Mike Donnelly	81	21	21	42	34
Tomas Sandstrom	51	17	24	41	59
Darryl Sydor	84	8	27	35	94
John Druce	55	14	17	31	50
Pat Conacher	77	15	13	28	71
Shawn McEachern	49	8	13	21	24
Tony Granato	50	7	14	21	150
Warren Rychel	80	10	9	19	322
Robert Lang	32	9	10	19	10
Charlie Huddy	79	5	13	18	71
Jimmy Carson	25	4	7	11	2
Kevin Todd	12	3	8	11	8
Marty McSorley	18	4	6	10	55
Tim Watters	60	1	9	10	67
Dixon Ward	34	6	2	8	45
Doug Houda	54	2	6	8	165
Dave Taylor	33	4	3	7	28
Gary Shuchuk	56	3	4	7	30
Dominic Lavoie	8	3	3	6	2
Brian McReynolds	20	1	3	4	4
Mark Hardy	16	0	3	3	27
Dan Currie	5	1	1	2	0
Jim Paek	18	1	1	2	10
Phil Crowe	31	0	2	2	77
Keith Redmond	12	1	0	1	20
Brent Thompson	24	1	0	1	81
Kelly Hrudey	64	0	1	1	6
Bob Jay	3	0	1	1	0
Guy Leveque	5	0	1	1	2
Rob Murphy	8	0	1	1	22
Donald Dufresne	9	0	0	0	10
David Goverde	1	0	0	0	0
Justin Hocking	1	0	0	0	0
Rick Knickle	4	0	0	0	0
Marc Potvin	3	0	0	0	26
Robb Stauber	22	0	0	0	18
Dave Thomlinson	7	0	0	0	21

Goaltending

Player	MIN	GP	W	L	T	GA	GAA	SA	SV	SV%	SO
Kelly Hrudey	3713	64	22	31	7	228	3.68	2219	1991	.897	1
Robb Stauber	1144	22	4	11	5	65	3.41	706	641	.908	1
Rick Knickle	174	4	1	2	0	9	3.10	71	62	.873	0
David Goverde	60	1	0	1	0	7	7.00	37	30	.811	0
Team:	5091	84	27	45	12	309	3.64	3033	2724	.898	2

== Awards and honors ==
- Wayne Gretzky, Art Ross Trophy
- Wayne Gretzky, Lester Patrick Trophy

== Transactions ==
The Kings were involved in the following transactions during the 1993–94 season.

=== Trades ===
June 26, 1993	To Los Angeles Kings 5th round pick in 1993 - Jason Saal	To New Jersey Devils Corey Millen
August 27, 1993	To Los Angeles Kings Shawn McEachern	To Pittsburgh Penguins Marty McSorley
November 2, 1993	To Los Angeles Kings Future considerations	To Edmonton Oilers Jeff Chychrun
November 3, 1993	To Los Angeles Kings Doug Houda	To Hartford Whalers Marc Potvin
January 8, 1994	To Los Angeles Kings Dixon Ward	To Vancouver Canucks Jimmy Carson
January 28, 1994	To Los Angeles Kings Brad Tiley	To New York Rangers 11th round pick in 1994 - Jamie Butt
February 15, 1994	To Los Angeles Kings Marty McSorley; Jim Paek	To Pittsburgh Penguins Shawn McEachern; Tomas Sandstrom
March 19, 1994	To Los Angeles Kings Donald Dufresne	To Tampa Bay Lightning 6th round pick in 1994 - Dan Juden
March 21, 1994	To Los Angeles Kings Kevin Todd	To Chicago Blackhawks 4th round pick in 1994 - Steve McLaren

=== Free agent signings ===
July 15, 1993	From Hartford Whalers Brian Chapman
July 16, 1993	From Fort Wayne Komets (IHL) Bob Jay
July 16, 1993	From Edmonton Oilers Dan Currie
July 16, 1993	From Boston Bruins Dominic Lavoie
July 22, 1993	From New York Rangers Dave Thomlinson
July 29, 1993	From New York Rangers Brian McReynolds
August 2, 1993	From Winnipeg Jets John Druce
August 2, 1993	From Ottawa Senators Rob Murphy
October 13, 1993	From Hull Olympiques (QMJHL) Eric Lavigne
November 8, 1993	From Fort Wayne Komets (IHL) Phil Crowe

=== Lost in expansion draft ===
June 24, 1993	To Anaheim Mighty Ducks Jim Thomson
June 24, 1993	To Anaheim Mighty Ducks Lonnie Loach

== Draft picks ==
Los Angeles' draft picks at the 1993 NHL entry draft held at the Quebec Coliseum in Quebec City, Quebec. The Kings first pick, in the second round, was used to choose Shayne Toporowski from the Prince Albert Raiders of the Western Hockey League. Their first-round pick had been dealt to the Edmonton Oilers in the Wayne Gretzky trade.

Round	Pick	Player	Nationality	Pos	GP	G	A	Pts	PIM
2	42	Shayne Toporowski	Canada	RW	3	0	0	0	7
3	68	Jeff Mitchell	United States	RW	7	0	0	0	7
4	94	Bob Wren	Canada	C	5	0	0	0	0
5	105	Frederik Beaubien	Canada	G					
5	117	Jason Saal	United States	G					
5	120	Tomas Vlasak	Czech Republic	LW	10	1	3	4	2
6	146	Jere Karalahti	Finland	D	149	8	19	27	97
7	172	Justin Martin	United States	RW					
8	198	Travis Dillabough	Canada	LW					
9	224	Martin Strbak	Slovakia	D	49	5	11	16	46
10	250	Kimmo Timonen	Finland	D	1108	117	454	571	654
11	276	Patrick Howald	Switzerland	LW					
