= 1993–94 Tampa Bay Lightning season =

Ice hockey team season

1993–94 Tampa Bay Lightning
- Division: 7th Atlantic
- Conference: 12th Eastern
- 1993–94 record: 30–43–11
- Home record: 14–21–6
- Road record: 16–22–5
- Goals for: 224
- Goals against: 251

Team information
- General manager: Phil Esposito
- Coach: Terry Crisp
- Captain: Vacant
- Arena: ThunderDome
- Minor league affiliates: Atlanta Knights (IHL); Knoxville Cherokees (ECHL)

Team leaders
- Goals: Petr Klima (28)
- Assists: Brian Bradley (40)
- Points: Brian Bradley (64)
- Penalty minutes: Roman Hamrlik (135)
- Plus/minus: John Tucker (+9)
- Wins: Daren Puppa (22)
- Goals against average: Wendell Young (2.50)

The 1993–94 Tampa Bay Lightning season was the Lightning's second season of operation. The team finished last in the Atlantic Division and did not qualify for the playoffs.

== Offseason ==
Buoyed by an active off-season, confidence was high as the Lightning headed to Lakeland to prepare for the team's second National Hockey League season. The team was moved to the newly formed Atlantic Division in the Eastern Conference, prompting the beginning of several heated rivalries with East Coast teams such as Philadelphia and Florida.

Brian Bradley, fresh from an 86-point All-Star season, returned to lead the offense. Notably absent was Chris Kontos, who couldn't agree to a contract with the team. Offense, however, was expected to be a stronger area for the Lightning, with the off-season additions of flashy playmaker Denis Savard fresh off a Stanley Cup championship the previous season (free agent) and renowned sniper Petr Klima (trade with Edmonton). And with a move from Expo Hall across Tampa Bay to the Florida Suncoast Dome (soon renamed ThunderDome), the team was hoping the added stars would help fill the almost 30,000 seats available in St. Petersburg.

Another notable addition that would prove to be the most significant for the Lightning was the claim of veteran goaltender Daren Puppa from Florida in Phase II of the 1993 NHL Expansion Draft. Puppa, a former NHL All-Star with Buffalo, moved to the forefront in the Lightning net and posted a 22-33-6 record while the team allowed 81 fewer goals than in 1992-93.

Other notable additions to the Lightning lineup in 1993-94 included first-round draft choice Chris Gratton and a pair of heavyweights Tampa Bay fans would grow to love—Rudy Poeschek and Enrico Ciccone. Poeschek, a defenseman/forward signed as a free agent after time with the Rangers and Winnipeg, stepped into the enforcer role and immediately elicited chants of "Rudy" from ThunderDome crowds. Ciccone was acquired in a late-season deal that sent Joe Reekie to Washington, and "Chico" quickly teamed with Poeschek to form one of the most formidable tandems in the league.

== Regular season ==
On the ice, the team couldn't match the hot start from 1992 to 1993, and quickly dropped to 3-12-2 by early November. However, a bit of NHL history was made early in the season when the first regular-season game at the ThunderDome, which drew an NHL-record 27,227 fans to watch the Lightning face the Panthers on October 9, 1993. That attendance mark remains as the league record for a regular season game. Also, that same month when the Los Angeles Kings came to town (October 20), NHL legend Wayne Gretzky faced his brother—Lightning 1992 draft choice Brent—for the only time in his career. Older brother Wayne got the better end of Brent this evening, helping Los Angeles to a 4-3 victory with a goal and an assist. The season did, however, have its share of highlights. The Lightning eventually began to show more consistency, and a 9-3-1 stretch through late December (a month that also featured the team's most successful road trip to that point, a 3–0 December swing through California that pushed the Lightning's record in the Golden State to a perfect 7-0.) and most of January put the Bolts back in the race. The Bolts closed out the season with a 5-2 victory against Quebec at the ThunderDome and with high hopes for even more improvement in 1994–95. Although they never managed to reach .500, the Lightning posted a marked improvement with seven more wins and 18 more points than the previous year.

In addition to being their first season in the ThunderDome, the team played four regular-season home games in Orlando at Orlando Arena.

The Lightning finished the regular season as the NHL's most disciplined team, being shorthanded only 335 times. They also allowed the most short-handed goals in the league, with 20.

=== Final standings ===
Atlantic Division
| No. | CR | | GP | W | L | T | GF | GA | Pts |
|---|---|---|---|---|---|---|---|---|---|
| 1 | 1 | **New York Rangers** | 84 | 52 | 24 | 8 | 299 | 231 | 112 |
| 2 | 3 | **New Jersey Devils** | 84 | 47 | 25 | 12 | 306 | 220 | 106 |
| 3 | 7 | **Washington Capitals** | 84 | 39 | 35 | 10 | 277 | 263 | 88 |
| 4 | 8 | **New York Islanders** | 84 | 36 | 36 | 12 | 282 | 264 | 84 |
| 5 | 9 | Florida Panthers | 84 | 33 | 34 | 17 | 233 | 233 | 83 |
| 6 | 10 | Philadelphia Flyers | 84 | 35 | 39 | 10 | 294 | 314 | 80 |
| 7 | 12 | Tampa Bay Lightning | 84 | 30 | 43 | 11 | 224 | 251 | 71 |

Note: No. = Division rank, CR = Conference rank, W = Wins, L = Losses, T = Ties, GF = Goals For, GA = Goals Against, Pts = Points
Teams that qualified for the playoffs are highlighted in bold.

Eastern Conference
| R | | GP | W | L | T | GF | GA | Pts |
|---|---|---|---|---|---|---|---|---|
| **1** | **p-New York Rangers *** | **84** | **52** | **24** | **8** | **299** | **231** | **112** |
| **2** | **x-Pittsburgh Penguins *** | **84** | **44** | **27** | **13** | **299** | **285** | **101** |
| **3** | **New Jersey Devils** | **84** | **47** | **25** | **12** | **306** | **220** | **106** |
| **4** | **Boston Bruins** | **84** | **42** | **29** | **13** | **289** | **252** | **97** |
| **5** | **Montreal Canadiens** | **84** | **41** | **29** | **14** | **283** | **248** | **96** |
| **6** | **Buffalo Sabres** | **84** | **43** | **32** | **9** | **282** | **218** | **95** |
| **7** | **Washington Capitals** | **84** | **39** | **35** | **10** | **277** | **263** | **88** |
| **8** | **New York Islanders** | **84** | **36** | **36** | **12** | **282** | **264** | **84** |
| 9 | Florida Panthers | 84 | 33 | 34 | 17 | 233 | 233 | 83 |
| 10 | Philadelphia Flyers | 84 | 35 | 39 | 10 | 294 | 314 | 80 |
| 11 | Quebec Nordiques | 84 | 34 | 42 | 8 | 277 | 292 | 76 |
| 12 | Tampa Bay Lightning | 84 | 30 | 43 | 11 | 224 | 251 | 71 |
| 13 | Hartford Whalers | 84 | 27 | 48 | 9 | 227 | 288 | 63 |
| 14 | Ottawa Senators | 84 | 14 | 61 | 9 | 201 | 397 | 37 |

| Final standings |

bold – Qualified for playoffs; x – Won division; p – Won Presidents' Trophy (and division); * – Division leader

== Schedule and results ==
1993–94 regular season
October: 3–8–1 (home: 3–5–0; road: 0–3–1)

| Game | Date | Score | Opponent | Record | Recap |
|---|---|---|---|---|---|
| 1 | October 6, 1993 | 1–2 | @ New Jersey Devils (1993–94) | 0–1–0 | L |
| 2 | October 7, 1993 | 4–5 | @ New York Rangers (1993–94) | 0–2–0 | L |
| 3 | October 9, 1993 | 0–2 | Florida Panthers (1993–94) | 0–3–0 | L |
| 4 | October 14, 1993 | 3–2 | Pittsburgh Penguins (1993–94) | 1–3–0 | W |
| 5 | October 16, 1993 | 4–1 | Ottawa Senators (1993–94) | 2–3–0 | W |
| 6 | October 17, 1993 | 3–3 OT | @ Florida Panthers (1993–94) | 2–3–1 | T |
| 7 | October 20, 1993 | 3–4 | Los Angeles Kings (1993–94) | 2–4–1 | L |
| 8 | October 22, 1993 | 4–1 | New York Rangers (1993–94) | 3–4–1 | W |
| 9 | October 23, 1993 | 0–2 | Toronto Maple Leafs (1993–94) | 3–5–1 | L |
| 10 | October 27, 1993 | 3–4 | Winnipeg Jets (1993–94) | 3–6–1 | L |
| 11 | October 29, 1993 | 2–4 | New York Islanders (1993–94) | 3–7–1 | L |
| 12 | October 30, 1993 | 1–2 OT | @ Florida Panthers (1993–94) | 3–8–1 | L |

November: 3–8–1 (home: 3–3–0; road: 0–5–1)

| Game | Date | Score | Opponent | Record | Recap |
|---|---|---|---|---|---|
| 13 | November 2, 1993 | 2–8 | @ Quebec Nordiques (1993–94) | 3–9–1 | L |
| 14 | November 3, 1993 | 0–1 | @ Montreal Canadiens (1993–94) | 3–10–1 | L |
| 15 | November 6, 1993 | 1–1 OT | @ Boston Bruins (1993–94) | 3–10–2 | T |
| 16 | November 8, 1993 | 3–6 | @ New York Rangers (1993–94) | 3–11–2 | L |
| 17 | November 11, 1993 | 1–4 | Washington Capitals (1993–94) | 3–12–2 | L |
| 18 | November 13, 1993 | 4–3 | Quebec Nordiques (1993–94) | 4–12–2 | W |
| 19 | November 17, 1993 | 3–4 | @ Dallas Stars (1993–94) | 4–13–2 | L |
| 20 | November 19, 1993 | 3–5 | New York Rangers (1993–94) | 4–14–2 | L |
| 21 | November 20, 1993 | 4–3 | Chicago Blackhawks (1993–94) | 5–14–2 | W |
| 22 | November 24, 1993 | 4–1 | Hartford Whalers (1993–94) | 6–14–2 | W |
| 23 | November 26, 1993 | 0–3 | @ Philadelphia Flyers (1993–94) | 6–15–2 | L |
| 24 | November 27, 1993 | 3–4 OT | Philadelphia Flyers (1993–94) | 6–16–2 | L |

December: 6–6–2 (home: 1–4–1; road: 5–2–1)

| Game | Date | Score | Opponent | Record | Recap |
|---|---|---|---|---|---|
| 25 | December 1, 1993 | 0–3 | Buffalo Sabres (1993–94) | 6–17–2 | L |
| 26 | December 4, 1993 | 5–4 | @ Los Angeles Kings (1993–94) | 7–17–2 | W |
| 27 | December 5, 1993 | 4–2 | @ Mighty Ducks of Anaheim (1993–94) | 8–17–2 | W |
| 28 | December 7, 1993 | 3–1 | @ San Jose Sharks (1993–94) | 9–17–2 | W |
| 29 | December 11, 1993 | 3–6 | Pittsburgh Penguins (1993–94) | 9–18–2 | L |
| 30^{[a]} | December 14, 1993 | 1–1 OT | Montreal Canadiens (1993–94) | 9–18–3 | T |
| 31 | December 15, 1993 | 4–3 | Ottawa Senators (1993–94) | 10–18–3 | W |
| 32 | December 18, 1993 | 3–5 | Boston Bruins (1993–94) | 10–19–3 | L |
| 33 | December 19, 1993 | 3–3 OT | @ Buffalo Sabres (1993–94) | 10–19–4 | T |
| 34 | December 21, 1993 | 3–8 | @ Pittsburgh Penguins (1993–94) | 10–20–4 | L |
| 35 | December 23, 1993 | 4–7 | @ St. Louis Blues (1993–94) | 10–21–4 | L |
| 36^{[a]} | December 26, 1993 | 1–3 | Florida Panthers (1993–94) | 10–22–4 | L |
| 37 | December 28, 1993 | 4–1 | @ Quebec Nordiques (1993–94) | 11–22–4 | W |
| 38 | December 30, 1993 | 3–0 | @ Ottawa Senators (1993–94) | 12–22–4 | W |
Notes:^{a} Game played at the Orlando Arena.

January: 7–4–2 (home: 3–3–1; road: 4–1–1)

| Game | Date | Score | Opponent | Record | Recap |
|---|---|---|---|---|---|
| 39 | January 1, 1994 | 5–5 OT | @ Washington Capitals (1993–94) | 12–22–5 | T |
| 40^{[a]} | January 2, 1994 | 1–4 | Mighty Ducks of Anaheim (1993–94) | 12–23–5 | L |
| 41 | January 4, 1994 | 1–0 | @ Toronto Maple Leafs (1993–94) | 13–23–5 | W |
| 42 | January 8, 1994 | 4–2 | Philadelphia Flyers (1993–94) | 14–23–5 | W |
| 43 | January 10, 1994 | 5–2 | @ New York Rangers (1993–94) | 15–23–5 | W |
| 44 | January 12, 1994 | 4–2 | @ Detroit Red Wings (1993–94) | 16–23–5 | W |
| 45 | January 13, 1994 | 0–1 | @ Chicago Blackhawks (1993–94) | 16–24–5 | L |
| 46 | January 16, 1994 | 3–2 OT | @ Winnipeg Jets (1993–94) | 17–24–5 | W |
| 47 | January 17, 1994 | 3–6 | Detroit Red Wings (1993–94) | 17–25–5 | L |
| 48 | January 19, 1994 | 4–3 OT | New York Islanders (1993–94) | 18–25–5 | W |
| 49^{[a]} | January 24, 1994 | 4–0 | Buffalo Sabres (1993–94) | 19–25–5 | W |
| 50 | January 26, 1994 | 1–1 OT | Florida Panthers (1993–94) | 19–25–6 | T |
| 51 | January 29, 1994 | 1–2 | San Jose Sharks (1993–94) | 19–26–6 | L |
Notes:^{a} Game played at the Orlando Arena.

February: 4–7–2 (home: 1–2–2; road: 3–5–0)

| Game | Date | Score | Opponent | Record | Recap |
|---|---|---|---|---|---|
| 52 | February 2, 1994 | 1–3 | Detroit Red Wings (1993–94) | 19–27–6 | L |
| 53 | February 5, 1994 | 3–6 | @ Washington Capitals (1993–94) | 19–28–6 | L |
| 54 | February 7, 1994 | 2–1 | @ Toronto Maple Leafs (1993–94) | 20–28–6 | W |
| 55 | February 10, 1994 | 6–2 | @ Ottawa Senators (1993–94) | 21–28–6 | W |
| 56 | February 12, 1994 | 2–3 | Vancouver Canucks (1993–94) | 21–29–6 | L |
| 57 | February 13, 1994 | 3–3 OT | New Jersey Devils (1993–94) | 21–29–7 | T |
| 58 | February 15, 1994 | 1–2 | @ New York Islanders (1993–94) | 21–30–7 | L |
| 59 | February 17, 1994 | 4–3 | Montreal Canadiens (1993–94) | 22–30–7 | W |
| 60 | February 19, 1994 | 4–5 | @ New Jersey Devils (1993–94) | 22–31–7 | L |
| 61 | February 20, 1994 | 2–2 OT | Boston Bruins (1993–94) | 22–31–8 | T |
| 62 | February 24, 1994 | 4–0 | @ Calgary Flames (1993–94) | 23–31–8 | W |
| 63 | February 26, 1994 | 1–3 | @ Vancouver Canucks (1993–94) | 23–32–8 | L |
| 64 | February 27, 1994 | 2–3 | @ Edmonton Oilers (1993–94) | 23–33–8 | L |

March: 3–7–3 (home: 1–4–2; road: 2–3–1)

| Game | Date | Score | Opponent | Record | Recap |
|---|---|---|---|---|---|
| 65 | March 1, 1994 | 4–3 | @ Washington Capitals (1993–94) | 24–33–8 | W |
| 66 | March 3, 1994 | 4–5 OT | New Jersey Devils (1993–94) | 24–34–8 | L |
| 67 | March 5, 1994 | 4–2 | Hartford Whalers (1993–94) | 25–34–8 | W |
| 68 | March 6, 1994 | 1–3 | Philadelphia Flyers (1993–94) | 25–35–8 | L |
| 69 | March 9, 1994 | 1–4 | @ Hartford Whalers (1993–94) | 25–36–8 | L |
| 70 | March 13, 1994 | 5–5 OT | @ Philadelphia Flyers (1993–94) | 25–36–9 | T |
| 71 | March 15, 1994 | 3–7 | Calgary Flames (1993–94) | 25–37–9 | L |
| 72 | March 16, 1994 | 4–4 OT | Edmonton Oilers (1993–94) | 25–37–10 | T |
| 73 | #March 20, 1994 | 0–3 | Washington Capitals (1993–94) | 25–38–10 | L |
| 74 | March 22, 1994 | 4–5 OT | @ New York Islanders (1993–94) | 25–39–10 | L |
| 75 | March 24, 1994 | 1–2 | @ New Jersey Devils (1993–94) | 25–40–10 | L |
| 76 | March 27, 1994 | 2–2 OT | Dallas Stars (1993–94) | 25–40–11 | T |
| 77 | March 30, 1994 | 3–2 OT | @ Buffalo Sabres (1993–94) | 26–40–11 | W |

April: 4–3–0 (home: 2–1–0; road: 2–2–0)

| Game | Date | Score | Opponent | Record | Recap |
|---|---|---|---|---|---|
| 78 | April 1, 1994 | 4–3 | St. Louis Blues (1993–94) | 27–40–11 | W |
| 79 | April 4, 1994 | 1–2 | @ Pittsburgh Penguins (1993–94) | 27–41–11 | L |
| 80 | April 6, 1994 | 3–1 | @ Montreal Canadiens (1993–94) | 28–41–11 | W |
| 81 | April 9, 1994 | 3–0 | @ Boston Bruins (1993–94) | 29–41–11 | W |
| 82 | April 10, 1994 | 4–6 | @ Hartford Whalers (1993–94) | 29–42–11 | L |
| 83 | April 13, 1994 | 0–2 | New York Islanders (1993–94) | 29–43–11 | L |
| 84 | April 14, 1994 | 5–2 | Quebec Nordiques (1993–94) | 30–43–11 | W |

Legend: W Win (2 points) L Loss (0 points) T Tie (1 point)

== Player statistics ==
=== Skaters ===
Regular season
| Player | GP | G | A | Pts | +/− | PIM |
|---|---|---|---|---|---|---|
| Brian Bradley | 78 | 24 | 40 | 64 | -8 | 56 |
| Petr Klima | 75 | 28 | 27 | 55 | -15 | 76 |
| Denis Savard | 74 | 18 | 28 | 46 | -1 | 106 |
| Danton Cole | 81 | 20 | 23 | 43 | 7 | 32 |
| Chris Gratton | 84 | 13 | 29 | 42 | -25 | 123 |
| John Tucker | 66 | 17 | 23 | 40 | 9 | 28 |
| Shawn Chambers | 66 | 11 | 23 | 34 | -6 | 23 |
| Chris Joseph † | 66 | 10 | 19 | 29 | -13 | 108 |
| Pat Elynuik † | 63 | 12 | 14 | 26 | -18 | 64 |
| Mikael Andersson | 76 | 13 | 12 | 25 | 8 | 23 |
| Roman Hamrlik | 64 | 3 | 18 | 21 | -14 | 135 |
| Adam Creighton | 53 | 10 | 10 | 20 | -7 | 37 |
| Marc Bergevin | 83 | 1 | 15 | 16 | -5 | 87 |
| Marc Bureau | 75 | 8 | 7 | 15 | -9 | 30 |
| Rob DiMaio ‡ | 39 | 8 | 7 | 15 | -5 | 40 |
| Gerard Gallant | 51 | 4 | 9 | 13 | -6 | 74 |
| Rob Zamuner | 59 | 6 | 6 | 12 | -9 | 42 |
| Joe Reekie ‡ | 73 | 1 | 11 | 12 | 8 | 127 |
| Tim Bergland | 51 | 6 | 5 | 11 | -14 | 6 |
| Rudy Poeschek | 71 | 3 | 6 | 9 | 3 | 118 |
| Donald Dufresne ‡ | 51 | 2 | 6 | 8 | -2 | 48 |
| Bill McDougall | 22 | 3 | 3 | 6 | -4 | 8 |
| Bob Beers ‡ | 16 | 1 | 5 | 6 | -11 | 12 |
| Chris LiPuma | 27 | 0 | 4 | 4 | 1 | 77 |
| Brent Gretzky | 10 | 1 | 2 | 3 | 0 | 2 |
| Jason Ruff | 6 | 1 | 2 | 3 | 2 | 2 |
| Enrico Ciccone † | 11 | 0 | 1 | 1 | -2 | 52 |
| Eric Charron | 4 | 0 | 0 | 0 | 0 | 2 |
| Cory Cross | 5 | 0 | 0 | 0 | -3 | 6 |
| Jim Cummins † | 4 | 0 | 0 | 0 | -1 | 13 |
| Jason Lafreniere | 1 | 0 | 0 | 0 | -1 | 0 |
| Normand Rochefort | 6 | 0 | 0 | 0 | -1 | 10 |
| Total | | 224 | 355 | 579 | — | 1,567 |

=== Goaltenders ===
Regular season
| Player | GP | GS | TOI | W | L | T | GA | GAA | SA | SV% | SO | G | A | PIM |
|---|---|---|---|---|---|---|---|---|---|---|---|---|---|---|
| Daren Puppa | 63 | 62 | 3,652:30 | 22 | 33 | 6 | 165 | 2.71 | 1,637 | .899 | 4 | 0 | 1 | 2 |
| Pat Jablonski | 15 | 13 | 833:46 | 5 | 6 | 3 | 54 | 3.89 | 374 | .856 | 0 | 0 | 0 | 0 |
| Wendell Young | 9 | 6 | 479:42 | 2 | 3 | 1 | 20 | 2.50 | 211 | .905 | 1 | 0 | 0 | 4 |
| Jean-Claude Bergeron | 3 | 3 | 134:08 | 1 | 1 | 1 | 7 | 3.13 | 69 | .899 | 0 | 0 | 0 | 0 |
| Total | | | 5,100:06 | 30 | 43 | 11 | 246 | 2.89 | 2,291 | .893 | 5 | 0 | 1 | 6 |

† Denotes player spent time with another team before joining the Lightning. Stats reflect time with the Lightning only.
‡ Denotes player was traded mid-season. Stats reflect time with the Lightning only.

Note: GP = Games played; G = Goals; A = Assists; Pts = Points; +/- = plus/minus; PIM = Penalty minutes;
TOI = Time on ice; W = Wins; L = Losses; T = Ties; GA = Goals-against; GAA = Goals-against average; SO = Shutouts; SA = Shots against; SV% = Save percentage;

== Transactions ==
=== Trades ===
| Date | Details | |
|---|---|---|
| June 8, 1993 | To Detroit Red Wings Steve Maltais | To Tampa Bay Lightning Dennis Vial |
| June 16, 1993 | To Edmonton Oilers 1994 3rd-round pick (60th overall) | To Tampa Bay Lightning Petr Klima |
| June 19, 1993 | To San Jose Sharks Dave Capuano | To Tampa Bay Lightning Peter Ahola |
| June 25, 1993 | To Florida Panthers 1993 3rd-round pick (78th overall) | To Tampa Bay Lightning Panthers agreed to select Daren Puppa in the 1993 NHL expansion draft |
| June 25, 1993 | To New York Rangers Glenn Healy | To Tampa Bay Lightning 1993 TB 3rd-round pick (55th overall) |
| October 5, 1993 | To Calgary Flames Peter Ahola | To Tampa Bay Lightning Cash |
| October 22, 1993 | To Washington Capitals 1995 Conditional 5th-round pick (108th overall) | To Tampa Bay Lightning Pat Elynuik |
| November 11, 1993 | To Edmonton Oilers Bob Beers | To Tampa Bay Lightning Chris Joseph |
| February 21, 1994 | To Toronto Maple Leafs Pat Jablonski | To Tampa Bay Lightning Future Considerations (Cash) |
| March 18, 1994 | To Philadelphia Flyers Rob DiMaio | To Tampa Bay Lightning Jim Cummins; 1995 4th-round pick (100th overall) |
| March 19, 1994 | To Los Angeles Kings Donald Dufresne | To Tampa Bay Lightning 1994 6th-round pick (137th overall) |
| March 21, 1994 | To Washington Capitals Joe Reekie | To Tampa Bay Lightning Enrico Ciccone; 1994 3rd-round pick (67th overall); 1995 Conditional 5th-round pick (108th overall) |
| May 31, 1994 | To New Jersey Devils 1994 4th-round pick (91st overall) | To Tampa Bay Lightning Jeff Toms |

=== Free agents ===
| Date | Player | Team |
|---|---|---|
| June 2, 1993 | Eric Dubois | |
| July 21, 1993 | Gerard Gallant | from Detroit Red Wings |
| July 23, 1993 | Denis Savard | from Montreal Canadiens |
| August 10, 1993 | Rudy Poeschek | from Toronto Maple Leafs |
| August 13, 1993 | Bill McDougall | from Edmonton Oilers |
| September 27, 1993 | Normand Rochefort | |
| September 28, 1993 | Bryan Fogarty | |

=== Waivers ===
| Date | Player | Team |
|---|---|---|
| March 19, 1994 | Tim Bergland | to Washington Capitals |

=== Signings ===
| Date | Player | Contract term |
|---|---|---|
| August 24, 1993 | Adam Creighton | |
| September 20, 1993 | Shawn Chambers | |
| June 2, 1994 | Allan Egeland | |

=== NHL Expansion Draft ===
==== Phase I ====
The following two players were selected from the Tampa Bay Lightning roster in the 1993 NHL expansion draft:

| Pick # | Player | Selected by |
|---|---|---|
| 19 | Dennis Vial | Mighty Ducks of Anaheim |
| 41 | Randy Gilhen | Florida Panthers |

==== Phase II ====
In the second phase of the expansion draft, Tampa Bay Lightning selected the following players from the Panthers and Mighty Ducks:

| Pick # | Player | Selected from |
|---|---|---|
| 1 | Glenn Healy | Mighty Ducks of Anaheim |
| 4 | Daren Puppa | Florida Panthers |

=== Departures ===
| Date | Player | Via | New Team |
|---|---|---|---|
| July 1, 1993 | Jock Callander | Free agency | Cleveland Lumberjacks (IHL) |
| July 1, 1993 | Alain Cote | Free agency | Quebec Nordiques |
| July 1, 1993 | Matt Hervey | Free agency | Milwaukee Admirals (IHL) |
| July 1, 1993 | David Littman | Free agency | Boston Bruins |
| July 1, 1993 | Keith Osborne | Free agency | Grasshopper Club Zürich (CHE.2) |
| July 1, 1993 | Shayne Stevenson | Free agency | EV MAK Bruneck (AL) |
| August 1, 1993 | Herb Raglan | Buyout | Ottawa Senators |
| August 1, 1993 | Steve Kasper | Retired | |

== Draft picks ==
Tampa Bay's draft picks at the 1993 NHL entry draft held at the Quebec Coliseum in Quebec City, Quebec.

| Round | # | Player | Position | Nationality | College/Junior/Club team (League) |
|---|---|---|---|---|---|
| 1 | 3 | Chris Gratton | C | Canada | Kingston Frontenacs (OHL) |
| 2 | 29 | Tyler Moss | G | Canada | Kingston Frontenacs (OHL) |
| 3 | 55 | Allan Egeland | C | Canada | Tacoma Rockets (WHL) |
| 4 | 81 | Marian Kacir | RW | Czech Republic | Owen Sound Platers (OHL) |
| 5 | 107 | Ryan Brown | D | Canada | Swift Current Broncos (WHL) |
| 6 | 133 | Kiley Hill | LW | Canada | Sault Ste. Marie Greyhounds (OHL) |
| 7 | 159 | Mathieu Raby | D | Canada | Victoriaville Tigres (QMJHL) |
| 8 | 185 | Ryan Nauss | LW | Canada | Peterborough Petes (OHL) |
| 9 | 211 | Alexandre LaPorte | D | Canada | Victoriaville Tigres (QMJHL) |
| 10 | 237 | Brett Duncan | D | Canada | Seattle Thunderbirds (WHL) |
| 11 | 263 | Mark Szoke | LW | Canada | Lethbridge Hurricanes (WHL) |
| S | 3 | Brent Peterson | LW | Canada | Michigan Technological University (WCHA) |
