= 1993–94 Hartford Whalers season =

National Hockey League team season

1993–94 Hartford Whalers
- Division: 6th Northeast
- Conference: 13th Eastern
- 1993–94 record: 27–48–9
- Home record: 14–22–6
- Road record: 13–26–3
- Goals for: 227
- Goals against: 288

Team information
- General manager: Paul Holmgren
- Coach: Paul Holmgren (Oct.–Nov.); Pierre McGuire (Nov.–Apr.)
- Captain: Pat Verbeek
- Alternate captains: Brad McCrimmon; Andrew Cassels
- Arena: Hartford Civic Center
- Average attendance: 10,407 (66.7%)
- Minor league affiliates: Springfield Indians (AHL); Raleigh IceCaps (ECHL)

Team leaders
- Goals: Geoff Sanderson (41)
- Assists: Andrew Cassels (42)
- Points: Pat Verbeek (75)
- Penalty minutes: Marc Potvin (246)
- Plus/minus: Alexander Godynyuk (+8)
- Wins: Sean Burke (17)
- Goals against average: Sean Burke (2.99)

The 1993–94 Hartford Whalers season was the 22nd season of the franchise, 15th season in the NHL. The Whalers missed the playoffs for the second consecutive season. It was the first season that all four former WHA teams (Edmonton, Hartford, Quebec, Winnipeg) missed the playoffs since joining the NHL in 1979.

== Off-season ==
On June 1, the Whalers acquired Brad McCrimmon from the Detroit Red Wings in exchange for a sixth-round draft pick in the 1993 NHL entry draft. McCrimmon scored 1 goal and 15 points in 60 games during the 1992–93 season. In his NHL career that began in 1979, McCrimmon had played in 1029 games, scoring 76 goals and 381 points. He was a member of the Calgary Flames during the 1988–89 season in which they won the Stanley Cup. During the 1985–86 season with the Philadelphia Flyers, McCrimmon scored 13 goals and 56 points in 80 games while having a plus-minus rating of +86. In 1987–88, his first season with the Flames, McCrimmon finished fourth in James Norris Memorial Trophy voting.

The Whalers acquired Sergei Makarov on June 20 in a trade with the Calgary Flames. Makarov scored 18 goals and 57 points in 71 games during the 1992–93 season. Makarov's stay with the Whalers would be short because six days later, he was traded to the San Jose Sharks (along with the Whalers' first-, second- and third-round draft picks in the 1993 NHL entry draft) in exchange for the Sharks' first-round draft pick, which was the second overall pick, in the 1993 NHL entry draft.

On June 24, the Whalers lost Terry Yake and Randy Ladouceur to the Mighty Ducks of Anaheim in the 1993 NHL expansion draft. Yake scored 22 goals and 53 points with the Whalers during the 1992–93 season, while Ladouceur scored 2 goals and 6 points in 62 games.

At the 1993 NHL entry draft held at Le Colisee in Quebec City on June 26, the Whalers held the second overall draft pick. With the pick, the Whalers selected Chris Pronger from the Peterborough Petes of the Ontario Hockey League. Pronger scored 15 goals and 77 points in 61 games, then scored 15 goals and 40 points in 21 playoff games for the Petes. Other players that the Whalers selected that played in the NHL include Marek Malik, Nolan Pratt, Manny Legace and Igor Chibirev.

At the 1993 NHL supplemental draft, the Whalers selected Kent Fearns from Colorado College. In 33 games during the 1992–93 season, Fearns scored 7 goals and 22 points for the Tigers.

On September 1, the Whalers announced that Brian Burke resigned from his position of general manager and president of the team as he joined the NHL front office as executive vice-president and director of hockey operations. Current head coach Paul Holmgren was named acting general manager.

On October 4, Hartford signed free agent Brian Propp. Propp appeared in 17 games with the Minnesota North Stars during the 1992–93 season, scoring three goals and six points. In 951 career games, Propp scored 413 goals and 975 points since beginning his career in the 1979–80 season with the Philadelphia Flyers. During his career, Propp had scored 40+ goals in a season four times, including a career-high 44 goals in the 1981–82 season.

== Regular season ==
The Whalers were put into the new Northeast Division after the Adams Division was discontinued.

After starting the season 4–11–2, Holmgren was named general manager and assistant coach Pierre Maguire was named head coach on November 16.

=== Final standings ===
Northeast Division
No.	CR		GP	W	L	T	GF	GA	Pts
1	2	**Pittsburgh Penguins**	84	44	27	13	299	285	101
2	4	**Boston Bruins**	84	42	29	13	289	252	97
3	5	**Montreal Canadiens**	84	41	29	14	283	248	96
4	6	**Buffalo Sabres**	84	43	32	9	282	218	95
5	11	Quebec Nordiques	84	34	42	8	277	292	76
6	13	Hartford Whalers	84	27	48	9	227	288	63
7	14	Ottawa Senators	84	14	61	9	201	397	37

Note: No. = Division rank, CR = Conference rank, W = Wins, L = Losses, T = Ties, GF = Goals For, GA = Goals Against, Pts = Points
Teams that qualified for the playoffs are highlighted in bold.

Eastern Conference
R		GP	W	L	T	GF	GA	Pts
**1**	**p-New York Rangers ***	**84**	**52**	**24**	**8**	**299**	**231**	**112**
**2**	**x-Pittsburgh Penguins ***	**84**	**44**	**27**	**13**	**299**	**285**	**101**
**3**	**New Jersey Devils**	**84**	**47**	**25**	**12**	**306**	**220**	**106**
**4**	**Boston Bruins**	**84**	**42**	**29**	**13**	**289**	**252**	**97**
**5**	**Montreal Canadiens**	**84**	**41**	**29**	**14**	**283**	**248**	**96**
**6**	**Buffalo Sabres**	**84**	**43**	**32**	**9**	**282**	**218**	**95**
**7**	**Washington Capitals**	**84**	**39**	**35**	**10**	**277**	**263**	**88**
**8**	**New York Islanders**	**84**	**36**	**36**	**12**	**282**	**264**	**84**
9	Florida Panthers	84	33	34	17	233	233	83
10	Philadelphia Flyers	84	35	39	10	294	314	80
11	Quebec Nordiques	84	34	42	8	277	292	76
12	Tampa Bay Lightning	84	30	43	11	224	251	71
13	Hartford Whalers	84	27	48	9	227	288	63
14	Ottawa Senators	84	14	61	9	201	397	37

Final standings

bold – Qualified for playoffs; x – Won division; p – Won Presidents' Trophy (and division); * – Division leader

== Schedule and results ==
1993–94 regular season
October: 3–8–1 (home: 1–3–1; road: 2–5–0)

Game	Date	Score	Opponent	Record	Attendance	Recap
1	October 6, 1993	3–4	@ Montreal Canadiens (1993–94)	0–1–0	16,430	L
2	October 9, 1993	2–5	Philadelphia Flyers (1993–94)	0–2–0	15,635	L
3	October 10, 1993	3–2	@ Buffalo Sabres (1993–94)	1–2–0	16,254	W
4	October 13, 1993	4–3	Montreal Canadiens (1993–94)	2–2–0	8,042	W
5	October 14, 1993	6–2	@ Chicago Blackhawks (1993–94)	3–2–0	16,721	W
6	October 16, 1993	3–5	@ Pittsburgh Penguins (1993–94)	3–3–0	16,624	L
7	October 19, 1993	2–7	@ Toronto Maple Leafs (1993–94)	3–4–0	15,644	L
8	October 20, 1993	2–5	Quebec Nordiques (1993–94)	3–5–0	7,315	L
9	October 23, 1993	3–3 OT	Buffalo Sabres (1993–94)	3–5–1	11,872	T
10	October 27, 1993	1–5	@ Dallas Stars (1993–94)	3–6–1	14,132	L
11	October 28, 1993	1–2	@ St. Louis Blues (1993–94)	3–7–1	16,584	L
12	October 30, 1993	1–4	New York Rangers (1993–94)	3–8–1	13,183	L

November: 4–7–1 (home: 2–4–1; road: 2–3–0)

Game	Date	Score	Opponent	Record	Attendance	Recap
13	November 1, 1993	2–4	St. Louis Blues (1993–94)	3–9–1	7,258	L
14	November 3, 1993	3–6	Calgary Flames (1993–94)	3–10–1	7,350	L
15	November 6, 1993	3–5	@ New York Islanders (1993–94)	3–11–1	9,648	L
16	November 10, 1993	4–3 OT	Ottawa Senators (1993–94)	4–11–1	7,232	W
17	November 13, 1993	4–4 OT	Edmonton Oilers (1993–94)	4–11–2	12,119	T
18	November 17, 1993	2–4	Boston Bruins (1993–94)	4–12–2	12,609	L
19	November 18, 1993	3–6	@ Philadelphia Flyers (1993–94)	4–13–2	17,106	L
20	November 20, 1993	2–3	San Jose Sharks (1993–94)	4–14–2	11,203	L
21	November 23, 1993	2–1 OT	@ Florida Panthers (1993–94)	5–14–2	12,015	W
22	November 24, 1993	1–4	@ Tampa Bay Lightning (1993–94)	5–15–2	19,374	L
23	November 27, 1993	4–0	Florida Panthers (1993–94)	6–15–2	10,837	W
24	November 29, 1993	4–2	@ Ottawa Senators (1993–94)	7–15–2	10,075	W

December: 6–6–1 (home: 4–4–0; road: 2–2–1)

Game	Date	Score	Opponent	Record	Attendance	Recap
25	December 1, 1993	5–3	Detroit Red Wings (1993–94)	8–15–2	7,917	W
26	December 4, 1993	6–7 OT	Pittsburgh Penguins (1993–94)	8–16–2	12,643	L
27	December 7, 1993	6–1	@ Washington Capitals (1993–94)	9–16–2	8,871	W
28	December 8, 1993	1–4	Vancouver Canucks (1993–94)	9–17–2	7,207	L
29	December 11, 1993	0–3	Buffalo Sabres (1993–94)	9–18–2	9,636	L
30	December 12, 1993	2–2 OT	@ Boston Bruins (1993–94)	9–18–3	13,334	T
31	December 15, 1993	2–5	@ New York Rangers (1993–94)	9–19–3	17,967	L
32	December 18, 1993	4–1	Washington Capitals (1993–94)	10–19–3	9,747	W
33	December 22, 1993	6–3	New Jersey Devils (1993–94)	11–19–3	8,548	W
34	December 23, 1993	2–1	@ Ottawa Senators (1993–94)	12–19–3	10,357	W
35	December 26, 1993	3–2 OT	Ottawa Senators (1993–94)	13–19–3	10,825	W
36	December 28, 1993	2–4	@ New Jersey Devils (1993–94)	13–20–3	15,107	L
37	December 29, 1993	3–5	Florida Panthers (1993–94)	13–21–3	9,749	L

January: 4–8–2 (home: 3–4–1; road: 1–4–1)

Game	Date	Score	Opponent	Record	Attendance	Recap
38	January 1, 1994	4–3	@ New York Islanders (1993–94)	14–21–3	9,746	W
39	January 2, 1994	7–2	Pittsburgh Penguins (1993–94)	15–21–3	11,665	W
40	January 5, 1994	4–0	Winnipeg Jets (1993–94)	16–21–3	8,669	W
41	January 6, 1994	1–2	St. Louis Blues (1993–94)	16–22–3	6,956	L
42	January 8, 1994	6–0	New York Islanders (1993–94)	17–22–3	12,225	W
43	January 12, 1994	4–6	@ Los Angeles Kings (1993–94)	17–23–3	16,005	L
44	January 14, 1994	3–6	@ Mighty Ducks of Anaheim (1993–94)	17–24–3	17,174	L
45	January 15, 1994	2–8	@ San Jose Sharks (1993–94)	17–25–3	17,190	L
46	January 17, 1994	3–5	@ Boston Bruins (1993–94)	17–26–3	13,890	L
47	January 19, 1994	3–3 OT	Toronto Maple Leafs (1993–94)	17–26–4	8,418	T
48	January 24, 1994	1–2	Boston Bruins (1993–94)	17–27–4	14,036	L
49	January 26, 1994	0–3	Montreal Canadiens (1993–94)	17–28–4	8,911	L
50	January 27, 1994	1–1 OT	@ Ottawa Senators (1993–94)	17–28–5	10,137	T
51	January 29, 1994	2–3	Quebec Nordiques (1993–94)	17–29–5	11,743	L

February: 4–6–2 (home: 1–2–1; road: 3–4–1)

Game	Date	Score	Opponent	Record	Attendance	Recap
52	February 1, 1994	2–1	@ Quebec Nordiques (1993–94)	18–29–5	15,023	W
53	February 2, 1994	2–9	@ Montreal Canadiens (1993–94)	18–30–5	16,325	L
54	February 4, 1994	2–2 OT	@ Winnipeg Jets (1993–94)	18–30–6	12,363	T
55	February 6, 1994	4–2	@ Vancouver Canucks (1993–94)	19–30–6	15,496	W
56	February 11, 1994	1–4	@ Calgary Flames (1993–94)	19–31–6	18,545	L
57	February 12, 1994	5–2	@ Edmonton Oilers (1993–94)	20–31–6	11,395	W
58	February 16, 1994	3–5	Buffalo Sabres (1993–94)	20–32–6	8,107	L
59	February 17, 1994	4–6	@ Pittsburgh Penguins (1993–94)	20–33–6	15,779	L
60	February 19, 1994	4–2	New York Rangers (1993–94)	21–33–6	15,635	W
61	February 24, 1994	0–3	@ Detroit Red Wings (1993–94)	21–34–6	11,621	L
62	February 26, 1994	1–1 OT	New Jersey Devils (1993–94)	21–34–7	12,343	T
63	February 27, 1994	1–3	Washington Capitals (1993–94)	21–35–7	10,016	L

March: 4–10–1 (home: 2–3–1; road: 2–7–0)

Game	Date	Score	Opponent	Record	Attendance	Recap
64	March 2, 1994	1–4	Los Angeles Kings (1993–94)	21–36–7	10,807	L
65	March 4, 1994	2–1	@ Florida Panthers (1993–94)	22–36–7	14,697	W
66	March 5, 1994	2–4	@ Tampa Bay Lightning (1993–94)	22–37–7	21,178	L
67	March 9, 1994	4–1	Tampa Bay Lightning (1993–94)	23–37–7	7,757	W
68	March 10, 1994	0–4	@ New Jersey Devils (1993–94)	23–38–7	11,818	L
69	March 12, 1994	2–2 OT	Dallas Stars (1993–94)	23–38–8	11,402	T
70	March 13, 1994	2–3	Pittsburgh Penguins (1993–94)	23–39–8	11,862	L
71	March 16, 1994	0–4	@ New York Rangers (1993–94)	23–40–8	18,200	L
72	March 17, 1994	1–4	@ Quebec Nordiques (1993–94)	23–41–8	14,131	L
73	March 19, 1994	5–3	@ Philadelphia Flyers (1993–94)	24–41–8	17,380	W
74	March 22, 1994	1–4	@ Washington Capitals (1993–94)	24–42–8	11,267	L
75	March 25, 1994	3–6	@ Buffalo Sabres (1993–94)	24–43–8	15,003	L
76	March 26, 1994	2–3	Mighty Ducks of Anaheim (1993–94)	24–44–8	15,635	L
77	March 29, 1994	2–6	@ Detroit Red Wings (1993–94)	24–45–8	19,734	L
78	March 30, 1994	3–2 OT	Chicago Blackhawks (1993–94)	25–45–8	8,285	W

April: 2–3–1 (home: 1–2–1; road: 1–1–0)

Game	Date	Score	Opponent	Record	Attendance	Recap
79	April 2, 1994	5–6	Philadelphia Flyers (1993–94)	25–46–8	13,655	L
80	April 6, 1994	3–3 OT	New York Islanders (1993–94)	25–46–9	9,052	T
81	April 7, 1994	2–5	@ Quebec Nordiques (1993–94)	25–47–9	15,324	L
82	April 10, 1994	6–4	Tampa Bay Lightning (1993–94)	26–47–9	10,141	W
83	April 11, 1994	1–3	Montreal Canadiens (1993–94)	26–48–9	8,568	L
84	April 14, 1994	3–2	@ Boston Bruins (1993–94)	27–48–9	14,054	W

Legend: W Win (2 points) L Loss (0 points) T Tie (1 point)

== Player statistics ==
=== Regular season ===
Scoring

Player	Pos	GP	G	A	Pts	PIM	+/-	PPG	SHG	GWG
Pat Verbeek	RW	84	37	38	75	177	-15	15	1	3
Geoff Sanderson	LW	82	41	26	67	42	-13	15	1	6
Andrew Cassels	C	79	16	42	58	37	-21	8	1	3
Robert Kron	LW	77	24	26	50	8	0	2	1	3
Michael Nylander	C	58	11	33	44	24	-2	4	0	1
Zarley Zalapski	D	56	7	30	37	56	-6	0	0	0
Chris Pronger	D	81	5	25	30	113	-3	2	0	0
Brian Propp	LW	65	12	17	29	44	3	3	1	2
James Patrick	D	47	8	20	28	32	-12	4	1	2
Adam Burt	D	63	1	17	18	75	-4	0	0	0
Randy Cunneyworth	LW	63	9	8	17	87	-2	0	1	1
Jim Storm	LW	68	6	10	16	27	4	1	0	0
Igor Chibirev	C	37	4	11	15	2	7	0	0	1
Darren Turcotte	C	19	2	11	13	4	-11	0	0	0
Alexander Godynyuk	D	43	3	9	12	40	8	0	0	1
Mark Janssens	C	84	2	10	12	137	-13	0	0	0
Robert Petrovicky	C	33	6	5	11	39	-1	1	0	0
Bryan Marchment	D	42	3	7	10	124	-12	0	1	1
Mark Greig	RW	31	4	5	9	31	-6	0	0	0
Jim Sandlak	RW	27	6	2	8	32	6	2	0	1
Jocelyn Lemieux	RW	16	6	1	7	19	-8	0	0	2
Ted Drury	C	16	1	5	6	10	-10	0	0	0
Brad McCrimmon	D	65	1	5	6	72	-7	0	0	0
Kevin Smyth	LW	21	3	2	5	10	-1	0	0	0
Marc Potvin	RW	51	2	3	5	246	-5	0	0	0
Frantisek Kucera	D	16	1	3	4	14	-12	1	0	0
Patrick Poulin	C	9	2	1	3	11	-8	1	0	0
Ted Crowley	D	21	1	2	3	10	-1	1	0	0
Jim McKenzie	LW	26	1	2	3	67	-6	0	0	0
Bob McGill	D	30	0	3	3	41	-7	0	0	0
Paul Ranheim	LW	15	0	3	3	2	-11	0	0	0
John Stevens	D	9	0	3	3	4	4	0	0	0
Eric Weinrich	D	8	1	1	2	2	-5	1	0	0
Todd Harkins	C	28	1	0	1	49	-4	0	0	0
Dan Keczmer	D	12	0	1	1	12	-6	0	0	0
Jeff Reese	G	19	0	1	1	0	0	0	0	0
Sean Burke	G	47	0	0	0	16	0	0	0	0
Yvon Corriveau	LW	3	0	0	0	0	0	0	0	0
Mario Gosselin	G	7	0	0	0	0	0	0	0	0
Doug Houda	D	7	0	0	0	23	-4	0	0	0
Nick Kypreos	LW	10	0	0	0	37	-8	0	0	0
Mike Lenarduzzi	G	1	0	0	0	0	0	0	0	0
Allen Pedersen	D	7	0	0	0	9	-1	0	0	0
Frank Pietrangelo	G	19	0	0	0	2	0	0	0	0
Mike Tomlak	C/LW	1	0	0	0	0	0	0	0	0

Goaltending

Player	MIN	GP	W	L	T	GA	GAA	SO	SA	SV	SV%
Sean Burke	2750	47	17	24	5	137	2.99	2	1458	1321	.906
Frank Pietrangelo	984	19	5	11	1	59	3.60	0	473	414	.875
Jeff Reese	1086	19	5	9	3	56	3.09	1	524	468	.893
Mario Gosselin	239	7	0	4	0	21	5.27	0	107	86	.804
Mike Lenarduzzi	21	1	0	0	0	1	2.86	0	12	11	.917
Team:	5080	84	27	48	9	274	3.24	3	2574	2300	.894

Note: GP = Games played; G = Goals; A = Assists; Pts = Points; +/- = Plus-minus PIM = Penalty minutes; PPG = Power-play goals; SHG = Short-handed goals; GWG = Game-winning goals;
MIN = Minutes played; W = Wins; L = Losses; T = Ties; GA = Goals against; GAA = Goals-against average; SO = Shutouts; SA=Shots against; SV=Shots saved; SV% = Save percentage;

== Transactions ==
The Whalers were involved in the following transactions during the 1993–94 season.

=== Trades ===
June 1, 1993	To Detroit Red Wings 6th round pick in 1993	To Hartford Whalers Brad McCrimmon
June 20, 1993	To Calgary Flames 4th round pick in 1993	To Hartford Whalers Sergei Makarov
June 26, 1993	To San Jose Sharks Sergei Makarov; 1st round pick in 1993; 2nd round pick in 1993; 3rd round pick in 1993	To Hartford Whalers 1st round pick in 1993
November 2, 1993	To Chicago Blackhawks Eric Weinrich; Patrick Poulin	To Hartford Whalers Bryan Marchment; Steve Larmer
November 2, 1993	To New York Rangers Steve Larmer; Nick Kypreos; Barry Richter; 6th round pick in 1994	To Hartford Whalers James Patrick; Darren Turcotte
November 3, 1993	To Los Angeles Kings Doug Houda	To Hartford Whalers Marc Potvin
November 19, 1993	To Calgary Flames Dan Keczmer; Future Considerations	To Hartford Whalers Jeff Reese
December 16, 1993	To Florida Panthers Jim McKenzie	To Hartford Whalers Alexander Godynyuk
January 24, 1994	To Calgary Flames Scott Morrow	To Hartford Whalers Todd Harkins
January 25, 1994	To Toronto Maple Leafs Mark Greig; 6th round pick in 1995	To Hartford Whalers Ted Crowley
March 10, 1994	To Calgary Flames Michael Nylander; James Patrick; Zarley Zalapski	To Hartford Whalers Gary Suter; Paul Ranheim; Ted Drury
March 11, 1994	To Chicago Blackhawks Randy Cunneyworth; Gary Suter; 3rd round pick in 1995	To Hartford Whalers Frantisek Kucera; Jocelyn Lemieux
March 18, 1994	To Toronto Maple Leafs Ken Belanger	To Hartford Whalers 9th round pick in 1994

=== Waivers ===
November 3, 1993	From New York Islanders Bob McGill

=== Free agents ===
Player	Former team
Rob Cowie	Winnipeg Jets
Jeff Bloemberg	Edmonton Oilers
Rick Bennett	New York Rangers
Brian Propp	Minnesota North Stars

Player	New team
Joe Day	New York Islanders
Mike Maneluk	Anaheim Mighty Ducks

== Draft picks ==
Hartford's draft picks at the 1993 NHL entry draft held at the Quebec Coliseum in Quebec City, Quebec.

Round	#	Player	Position	Nationality	College/Junior/Club team (League)
1	2	Chris Pronger	Defense	Canada	Peterborough Petes (OHL)
3	72	Marek Malik	Defense	Czech Republic	TJ Vitkovice Jr. (Czech Republic)
4	84	Trevor Roenick	Right wing	United States	Boston Junior Bruins (NEJHL)
5	115	Nolan Pratt	Defense	Canada	Portland Winter Hawks (WHL)
8	188	Manny Legace	Goaltender	Canada	Niagara Falls Thunder (OHL)
9	214	Dmitri Gorenko	Forward	Russia	CSKA Moscow (Russia)
10	240	Wes Swinson	Defense	Canada	Kitchener Rangers (OHL)
11	266	Igor Chibirev	Center	Ukraine	Fort Wayne Komets (IHL)
S	6	Kent Fearns	Defense	Canada	Colorado College (WCHA)

== See also ==
- 1993–94 NHL season
