= 1993–94 San Jose Sharks season =

National Hockey League team season

1993–94 San Jose Sharks
- Division: 3rd Pacific
- Conference: 8th Western
- 1993–94 record: 33–35–16
- Home record: 19–13–10
- Road record: 14–22–6
- Goals for: 252
- Goals against: 265

Team information
- General manager: Chuck Grillo; Dean Lombardi
- Coach: Kevin Constantine
- Captain: Bob Errey
- Alternate captains: Igor Larionov; Jeff Odgers
- Arena: San Jose Arena
- Average attendance: 16,537
- Minor league affiliates: Kansas City Blades; Roanoke Express

Team leaders
- Goals: Sergei Makarov (30)
- Assists: Todd Elik (41)
- Points: Sergei Makarov (68)
- Penalty minutes: Jeff Odgers (222)
- Plus/minus: Igor Larionov (+20)
- Wins: Arturs Irbe (30)
- Goals against average: Arturs Irbe (2.84)

The 1993–94 San Jose Sharks season was the team's third season of operation in the National Hockey League (NHL). It saw the Sharks finish in third place in the Pacific Division with a record of 33 wins, 35 losses, and 16 ties for 82 points, clinching the eighth and final playoff spot in the newly rebranded Western Conference. San Jose achieved the largest turnaround in NHL history, recording a 58-point improvement from the previous season. Their 33 wins and 82 points in 1993–94 were more than their win and point totals in their first two seasons combined. In the playoffs, the Sharks upset the heavily favored Detroit Red Wings in the Conference Quarterfinals. However, they fell to the Toronto Maple Leafs in seven games in the Conference Semifinals.

This was the first season in which the Sharks actually played in San Jose. After playing their first two seasons at the Cow Palace in Daly City, the Sharks moved into the brand new San Jose Arena for the 1993–94 season.

== Offseason ==
The Sharks selected Viktor Kozlov with their first-round pick, sixth overall.

Newly acquired forward Bob Errey, was named team captain. He replaced the retired Doug Wilson.

== Regular season ==
The Sharks had the fewest shots on goal (2,101) out of all 26 teams during the regular season.

=== Season standings ===
Pacific Division
No.	CR		GP	W	L	T	GF	GA	Pts
1	3	**Calgary Flames**	84	42	29	13	302	256	97
2	7	**Vancouver Canucks**	84	41	40	3	279	276	85
3	8	**San Jose Sharks**	84	33	35	16	252	265	82
4	9	Mighty Ducks of Anaheim	84	33	46	5	229	251	71
5	10	Los Angeles Kings	84	27	45	12	294	322	66
6	11	Edmonton Oilers	84	25	45	14	261	305	64

Note: No. = Division rank, CR = Conference rank, W = Wins, L = Losses, T = Ties, GF = Goals For, GA = Goals Against, Pts = Points
Teams that qualified for the playoffs are highlighted in bold.

Western Conference
R		Div	GP	W	L	T	GF	GA	Pts
**1**	**y- Detroit Red Wings ***	**CEN**	**84**	**46**	**30**	**8**	**356**	**275**	**100**
**2**	**x- Calgary Flames ***	**PAC**	**84**	**42**	**29**	**13**	**302**	**256**	**97**
**3**	**Toronto Maple Leafs**	**CEN**	**84**	**43**	**29**	**12**	**280**	**243**	**98**
**4**	**Dallas Stars**	**CEN**	**84**	**42**	**29**	**13**	**286**	**265**	**97**
**5**	**St. Louis Blues**	**CEN**	**84**	**40**	**33**	**11**	**270**	**283**	**91**
**6**	**Chicago Blackhawks**	**CEN**	**84**	**39**	**36**	**9**	**254**	**240**	**87**
**7**	**Vancouver Canucks**	**PAC**	**84**	**41**	**40**	**3**	**279**	**276**	**85**
**8**	**San Jose Sharks**	**PAC**	**84**	**33**	**35**	**16**	**252**	**265**	**82**
9	Mighty Ducks of Anaheim	PAC	84	33	46	5	229	251	71
10	Los Angeles Kings	PAC	84	27	45	12	294	322	66
11	Edmonton Oilers	PAC	84	25	45	14	261	305	64
12	Winnipeg Jets	CEN	84	24	51	9	245	344	57

Divisions: CEN – Central, PAC – Pacific

bold – Qualified for playoffs; x – Won division; y – Won Conference (and division); * – Division leader

== Playoffs ==
=== Conference Quarterfinals ===
In 1993–94, the Sharks made the playoffs for the first time in their history, qualifying as the eighth seed in the Western Conference despite being the only playoff team to have a losing record during the regular season. In the Conference Quarterfinals, they faced the top-seeded Detroit Red Wings, who featured Hockey Hall of Fame members Dino Ciccarelli, Paul Coffey, Sergei Fedorov, Mark Howe, Nicklas Lidstrom, and Steve Yzerman (in addition to Hall of Fame coach Scotty Bowman) and were a favorite to win the Stanley Cup. However, the Sharks silenced the crowd at Detroit's Joe Louis Arena by taking Game 1, 5–4, on a late goal by 18-year-old defenseman Vlastimil Kroupa. After the Red Wings won the next two contests – a 22-save, 4–0 shutout by rookie goaltender Chris Osgood in Game 2 and a 3–2 victory in Game 3 to spoil the Sharks' first-ever home playoff game – San Jose rallied behind goaltender Arturs Irbe to win Games 4 and 5. Detroit stormed back in Game 6, scoring the first five goals en route to a 7–1 drubbing of the Sharks to force a decisive Game 7. Johan Garpenlov and Sergei Makarov gave the Sharks a quick 2–0 lead, but Detroit's Kris Draper scored near the end of the first period and Vyacheslav Kozlov tied the game 2–2 early in the second period. At 13:25 of the third period, Red Wings goaltender Osgood was caught out of position trying to pass the puck up the left-side boards. The puck went right to San Jose's Jamie Baker, who fired it into the empty net for the go-ahead goal. The Sharks held on for a shocking 3–2 victory and a 4–3 series win, completing one of the biggest upsets in Stanley Cup Playoffs history.

=== Conference Semifinals ===
In the Conference Semifinals, the Sharks took on the Toronto Maple Leafs, who were the conference's third seed and had defeated the Chicago Blackhawks in six games in the Conference Quarterfinals. The two teams alternated victories in the series' first five games. As in their first-round series against Detroit, San Jose won the first game on the road, this time by a 3–2 score, as Johan Garpenlov scored the game-winning goal with 2:16 remaining. However, Toronto took Game 2, 5–1, as five different Maple Leaf players scored and three goals came on the power play. The two teams then shifted to the West Coast, where an Ulf Dahlen hat trick and aggressive checking keyed the Sharks to a 5–2 victory in Game 3, but the Leafs came back with a dominant special teams effort in Game 4, scoring two power-play goals and two short-handed goals – one of each coming from Dave Andreychuk – in an 8–3 rout of the Sharks. In Game 5, San Jose's Russian duo of Sergei Makarov and Igor Larionov, who had been held off the score sheet in the previous three games, came to life for three goals and five assists combined in a 5–2 win that put the team one win away from the Conference Finals heading into Game 6 in Toronto. This contest, tied at 2–2, went into overtime, where San Jose missed two opportunities to seal another astonishing upset. First, at 1:11 into the extra period, Garpenlov's shot beat Toronto goaltender Felix Potvin, but rang off the crossbar. Then, 3:20 into overtime, Sandis Ozolinsh chose to pass to Larionov during a 3-on-2 rush despite having room to shoot between two Toronto defensemen. The Leafs finally won the game 3–2 at 8:53 of overtime on a Mike Gartner goal to force a seventh game. In Game 7, also in Toronto, Wendel Clark scored two goals in a 4–2 Leafs victory as Toronto took the series 4–3 and advanced to the Conference Finals against the Vancouver Canucks.

== Schedule and results ==
=== Regular season ===
1993–94 regular season
October: 3–9–1 (home: 2–4–1; road: 1–5–0)

Game	Date	Score	Opponent	Record	Recap
1	October 6, 1993	2–3	@ Edmonton Oilers (1993–94)	0–1–0	L
2	October 7, 1993	2–6	@ Calgary Flames (1993–94)	0–2–0	L
3	October 10, 1993	2–5	@ Los Angeles Kings (1993–94)	0–3–0	L
4	October 14, 1993	1–2	Calgary Flames (1993–94)	0–4–0	L
5	October 16, 1993	1–1 OT	Boston Bruins (1993–94)	0–4–1	T
6	October 19, 1993	1–4	St. Louis Blues (1993–94)	0–5–1	L
7	October 21, 1993	2–5	@ St. Louis Blues (1993–94)	0–6–1	L
8	October 23, 1993	4–6	Vancouver Canucks (1993–94)	0–7–1	L
9	October 24, 1993	2–3 OT	@ Vancouver Canucks (1993–94)	0–8–1	L
10	October 26, 1993	3–1	Edmonton Oilers (1993–94)	1–8–1	W
11	October 28, 1993	4–3	Mighty Ducks of Anaheim (1993–94)	2–8–1	W
12	October 30, 1993	2–4	Washington Capitals (1993–94)	2–9–1	L
13	October 31, 1993	2–1 OT	@ Mighty Ducks of Anaheim (1993–94)	3–9–1	W

November: 7–4–3 (home: 3–1–2; road: 4–3–1)

Game	Date	Score	Opponent	Record	Recap
14	November 2, 1993	3–3 OT	Pittsburgh Penguins (1993–94)	3–9–2	T
15	November 5, 1993	4–2	Dallas Stars (1993–94)	4–9–2	W
16	November 7, 1993	1–2	New Jersey Devils (1993–94)	4–10–2	L
17	November 9, 1993	2–2 OT	Toronto Maple Leafs (1993–94)	4–10–3	T
18	November 11, 1993	0–4	@ Dallas Stars (1993–94)	4–11–3	L
19	November 13, 1993	4–2	@ New Jersey Devils (1993–94)	5–11–3	W
20	November 14, 1993	3–3 OT	@ New York Rangers (1993–94)	5–11–4	T
21	November 16, 1993	2–1	@ Washington Capitals (1993–94)	6–11–4	W
22	November 18, 1993	1–3	@ Boston Bruins (1993–94)	6–12–4	L
23	November 20, 1993	3–2	@ Hartford Whalers (1993–94)	7–12–4	W
24	November 21, 1993	5–6	@ Buffalo Sabres (1993–94)	7–13–4	L
25	November 23, 1993	6–4	Detroit Red Wings (1993–94)	8–13–4	W
26	November 26, 1993	4–3	@ Mighty Ducks of Anaheim (1993–94)	9–13–4	W
27	November 27, 1993	1–0	Mighty Ducks of Anaheim (1993–94)	10–13–4	W

December: 2–7–3 (home: 1–2–2; road: 1–5–1)

Game	Date	Score	Opponent	Record	Recap
28	December 3, 1993	3–3 OT	Winnipeg Jets (1993–94)	10–13–5	T
29	December 5, 1993	2–1	Florida Panthers (1993–94)	11–13–5	W
30	December 7, 1993	1–3	Tampa Bay Lightning (1993–94)	11–14–5	L
31	December 11, 1993	3–5	@ Detroit Red Wings (1993–94)	11–15–5	L
32	December 12, 1993	1–2	@ Chicago Blackhawks (1993–94)	11–16–5	L
33	December 15, 1993	1–3	St. Louis Blues (1993–94)	11–17–5	L
34	December 17, 1993	2–4	@ Edmonton Oilers (1993–94)	11–18–5	L
35	December 19, 1993	5–7	@ Quebec Nordiques (1993–94)	11–19–5	L
36	December 22, 1993	2–2 OT	@ Toronto Maple Leafs (1993–94)	11–19–6	T
37	December 23, 1993	3–5	@ Chicago Blackhawks (1993–94)	11–20–6	L
38	December 28, 1993	3–3 OT	Calgary Flames (1993–94)	11–20–7	T
39	December 31, 1993	3–2	@ Vancouver Canucks (1993–94)	12–20–7	W

January: 4–2–4 (home: 2–2–2; road: 2–0–2)

Game	Date	Score	Opponent	Record	Recap
40	January 2, 1994	4–4 OT	@ Edmonton Oilers (1993–94)	12–20–8	T
41	January 4, 1994	2–2 OT	Montreal Canadiens (1993–94)	12–20–9	T
42	January 6, 1994	3–10	Detroit Red Wings (1993–94)	12–21–9	L
43	January 11, 1994	2–2 OT	Los Angeles Kings (1993–94)	12–21–10	T
44	January 12, 1994	5–2	@ Mighty Ducks of Anaheim (1993–94)	13–21–10	W
45	January 15, 1994	8–2	Hartford Whalers (1993–94)	14–21–10	W
46	January 17, 1994	3–2	Calgary Flames (1993–94)	15–21–10	W
47	January 25, 1994	3–8	New York Rangers (1993–94)	15–22–10	L
48	January 28, 1994	3–3 OT	@ Florida Panthers (1993–94)	15–22–11	T
49	January 29, 1994	2–1	@ Tampa Bay Lightning (1993–94)	16–22–11	W

February: 6–8–1 (home: 4–3–0; road: 2–5–1)

Game	Date	Score	Opponent	Record	Recap
50	February 1, 1994	4–5	@ New York Islanders (1993–94)	16–23–11	L
51	February 3, 1994	3–2 OT	@ Philadelphia Flyers (1993–94)	17–23–11	W
52	February 5, 1994	3–4	@ St. Louis Blues (1993–94)	17–24–11	L
53	February 6, 1994	7–1	@ Dallas Stars (1993–94)	18–24–11	W
54	February 8, 1994	4–3	Chicago Blackhawks (1993–94)	19–24–11	W
55	February 11, 1994	4–3	Chicago Blackhawks (1993–94)	20–24–11	W
56	February 13, 1994	1–0	Chicago Blackhawks (1993–94)	21–24–11	W
57	February 15, 1994	4–6	Philadelphia Flyers (1993–94)	21–25–11	L
58	February 17, 1994	2–8	Quebec Nordiques (1993–94)	21–26–11	L
59	February 19, 1994	4–3	Los Angeles Kings (1993–94)	22–26–11	W
60	February 21, 1994	3–6	Dallas Stars (1993–94)	22–27–11	L
61	February 23, 1994	1–3	@ Montreal Canadiens (1993–94)	22–28–11	L
62	February 24, 1994	4–6	@ Ottawa Senators (1993–94)	22–29–11	L
63	February 26, 1994	0–2	@ Detroit Red Wings (1993–94)	22–30–11	L
64	February 28, 1994	3–3 OT	@ Winnipeg Jets (1993–94)	22–30–12	T

March: 8–3–3 (home: 5–1–2; road: 3–2–1)

Game	Date	Score	Opponent	Record	Recap
65	March 3, 1994	4–2	Edmonton Oilers (1993–94)	23–30–12	W
66	March 6, 1994	6–0	Mighty Ducks of Anaheim (1993–94)	24–30–12	W
67	March 8, 1994	4–4 OT	Buffalo Sabres (1993–94)	24–30–13	T
68	March 10, 1994	4–3	New York Islanders (1993–94)	25–30–13	W
69	March 12, 1994	0–2	@ Calgary Flames (1993–94)	25–31–13	L
70	March 17, 1994	1–2	Ottawa Senators (1993–94)	25–32–13	L
71	March 19, 1994	1–2	@ Los Angeles Kings (1993–94)	25–33–13	L
72	March 20, 1994	6–6 OT	Los Angeles Kings (1993–94)	25–33–14	T
73	March 22, 1994	2–2 OT	@ Pittsburgh Penguins (1993–94)	25–33–15	T
74	March 24, 1994	2–1	@ Toronto Maple Leafs (1993–94)	26–33–15	W
75	March 25, 1994	8–3	@ Winnipeg Jets (1993–94)	27–33–15	W
76	March 27, 1994	4–3	@ St. Louis Blues (1993–94)	28–33–15	W
77	March 29, 1994	9–4	Winnipeg Jets (1993–94)	29–33–15	W
78	March 31, 1994	5–3	Toronto Maple Leafs (1993–94)	30–33–15	W

April: 3–2–1 (home: 2–0–1; road: 1–2–0)

Game	Date	Score	Opponent	Record	Recap
79	April 2, 1994	7–4	Vancouver Canucks (1993–94)	31–33–15	W
80	April 5, 1994	2–1	@ Los Angeles Kings (1993–94)	32–33–15	W
81	April 7, 1994	2–3	@ Vancouver Canucks (1993–94)	32–34–15	L
82	April 8, 1994	2–5	@ Calgary Flames (1993–94)	32–35–15	L
83	April 10, 1994	3–1	Vancouver Canucks (1993–94)	33–35–15	W
84	April 13, 1994	2–2 OT	Edmonton Oilers (1993–94)	33–35–16	T

Legend: W Win (2 points) L Loss (0 points) T Tie (1 point)

=== Playoffs ===
1994 Stanley Cup playoffs
Western Conference Quarterfinals vs. (1) Detroit Red Wings – Sharks win 4–3

Game	Date	Score	Opponent	Series	Recap
1	April 18, 1994	5–4	@ Detroit Red Wings	Sharks lead 1–0	W
2	April 20, 1994	0–4	@ Detroit Red Wings	Series tied 1–1	L
3	April 22, 1994	2–3	Detroit Red Wings	Red Wings lead 2–1	L
4	April 23, 1994	4–3	Detroit Red Wings	Series tied 2–2	W
5	April 26, 1994	6–4	Detroit Red Wings	Sharks lead 3–2	W
6	April 28, 1994	1–7	@ Detroit Red Wings	Series tied 3–3	L
7	April 30, 1994	3–2	@ Detroit Red Wings	Sharks win 4–3	W

Western Conference Semifinals vs. (3) Toronto Maple Leafs – Maple Leafs win 4–3

Game	Date	Score	Opponent	Series	Recap
1	May 2, 1994	3–2	@ Toronto Maple Leafs	Sharks lead 1–0	W
2	May 4, 1994	1–5	@ Toronto Maple Leafs	Series tied 1–1	L
3	May 6, 1994	5–2	Toronto Maple Leafs	Sharks lead 2–1	W
4	May 8, 1994	3–8	Toronto Maple Leafs	Series tied 2–2	L
5	May 10, 1994	5–2	Toronto Maple Leafs	Sharks lead 3–2	W
6	May 12, 1994	2–3 OT	@ Toronto Maple Leafs	Series tied 3–3	L
7	May 14, 1994	2–4	@ Toronto Maple Leafs	Maple Leafs win 4–3	L

Legend: W Win L Loss

== Player statistics ==
Regular season
Scoring

Player	Pos	GP	G	A	Pts	PIM	+/-	PPG	SHG	GWG
Sergei Makarov	RW	80	30	38	68	78	11	10	0	5
Todd Elik	C	75	25	41	66	89	-3	9	0	4
Sandis Ozolinsh	D	81	26	38	64	24	16	4	0	3
Igor Larionov	C	60	18	38	56	40	20	3	2	2
Pat Falloon	RW	83	22	31	53	18	-3	6	0	1
Johan Garpenlov	LW	80	18	35	53	28	9	7	0	3
Ray Whitney	LW	61	14	26	40	14	2	1	0	0
Jeff Norton	D	64	7	33	40	36	16	1	0	0
Rob Gaudreau	RW	84	15	20	35	28	-10	6	0	4
Gaetan Duchesne	LW	84	12	18	30	28	8	0	1	3
Bob Errey	LW	64	12	18	30	126	-11	5	0	2
Tom Pederson	D	74	6	19	25	31	3	3	0	1
Jeff Odgers	RW	81	13	8	21	222	-13	7	0	0
Jamie Baker	C	65	12	5	17	38	2	0	0	2
Ulf Dahlen	LW	13	6	6	12	0	0	3	0	2
Mike Rathje	D	47	1	9	10	59	-9	1	0	0
Dale Craigwell	C	58	3	6	9	16	-13	0	1	0
Jay More	D	49	1	6	7	63	-5	0	0	0
Jaroslav Otevrel	LW	9	3	2	5	2	-5	1	0	0
Michal Sykora	D	22	1	4	5	14	-4	0	0	0
Kip Miller	C	11	2	2	4	6	-1	0	0	0
Mike Sullivan	C	26	2	2	4	4	-3	0	2	1
Vlastimil Kroupa	D	27	1	3	4	20	-6	0	0	0
Doug Zmolek	D	68	0	4	4	122	-9	0	0	0
Rob Zettler	D	42	0	3	3	65	-7	0	0	0
Vyacheslav Butsayev	C	12	0	2	2	10	-2	0	0	0
Shawn Cronin	D	34	0	2	2	76	2	0	0	0
Arturs Irbe	G	74	0	2	2	16	0	0	0	0
Mike Lalor	D	23	0	2	2	8	-5	0	0	0
Gary Emmons	C	3	1	0	1	0	-4	1	0	0
Jeff McLean	C	6	1	0	1	0	1	0	0	0
Dave Capuano	LW	4	0	1	1	0	-5	0	0	0
David Bruce	LW	2	0	0	0	0	-2	0	0	0
David Maley	LW	19	0	0	0	30	-1	0	0	0
Andrei Nazarov	LW	1	0	0	0	0	0	0	0	0
Jimmy Waite	G	15	0	0	0	6	0	0	0	0

Goaltending

Player	MIN	GP	W	L	T	GA	GAA	SO	SA	SV	SV%
Arturs Irbe	4412	74	30	28	16	209	2.84	3	2064	1855	.899
Jimmy Waite	697	15	3	7	0	50	4.30	0	319	269	.843
Team:	5109	84	33	35	16	259	3.04	3	2383	2124	.891

Playoffs
Scoring

Player	Pos	GP	G	A	Pts	PIM	+/-	PPG	SHG	GWG
Igor Larionov	C	14	5	13	18	10	-1	0	0	0
Sergei Makarov	RW	14	8	2	10	4	2	3	0	2
Todd Elik	C	14	5	5	10	12	-5	1	0	0
Johan Garpenlov	LW	14	4	6	10	6	0	0	0	2
Sandis Ozolinsh	D	14	0	10	10	8	3	0	0	0
Ulf Dahlen	LW	14	6	2	8	0	-3	3	0	1
Tom Pederson	D	14	1	6	7	2	-7	0	1	0
Jeff Norton	D	14	1	5	6	20	4	0	0	0
Jamie Baker	C	14	3	2	5	30	-1	0	0	1
Bob Errey	LW	14	3	2	5	10	-3	1	0	0
Gaetan Duchesne	LW	14	1	4	5	12	-2	0	0	0
Ray Whitney	LW	14	0	4	4	8	-4	0	0	0
Pat Falloon	RW	14	1	2	3	6	-2	0	0	0
Vlastimil Kroupa	D	14	1	2	3	21	-8	0	0	1
Rob Gaudreau	RW	14	2	0	2	0	-1	1	1	0
Jay More	D	13	0	2	2	32	-3	0	0	0
Shawn Cronin	D	14	1	0	1	20	-4	0	0	0
Arturs Irbe	G	14	0	0	0	6	0	0	0	0
Jeff Odgers	RW	11	0	0	0	11	-2	0	0	0
Mike Rathje	D	1	0	0	0	0	1	0	0	0
Jimmy Waite	G	2	0	0	0	0	0	0	0	0

Goaltending

Player	MIN	GP	W	L	GA	GAA	SO	SA	SV	SV%
Arturs Irbe	806	14	7	7	50	3.72	0	399	349	.875
Jimmy Waite	40	2	0	0	3	4.50	0	17	14	.824
Team:	846	14	7	7	53	3.76	0	416	363	.873

Note: Pos = Position; GP = Games played; G = Goals; A = Assists; Pts = Points; +/- = plus/minus; PIM = Penalty minutes; PPG = Power-play goals; SHG = Short-handed goals; GWG = Game-winning goals
MIN = Minutes played; W = Wins; L = Losses; T = Ties; GA = Goals-against; GAA = Goals-against average; SO = Shutouts; SA = Shots against; SV = Shots saved; SV% = Save percentage;

== Transactions ==
=== Trades ===
June 18, 1993	To Chicago Blackhawks Future considerations	To San Jose Sharks Jimmy Waite
June 19, 1993	To Tampa Bay Lightning Peter Ahola	To San Jose Sharks Dave Capuano
June 20, 1993	To Dallas Stars 6th-round pick in 1993	To San Jose Sharks Gaetan Duchesne
June 20, 1993	To New York Islanders 3rd-round pick in 1994; Future considerations	To San Jose Sharks Jeff Norton
June 26, 1993	To Hartford Whalers 1st-round pick in 1993	To San Jose Sharks Sergei Makarov; 1st-round pick in 1993; 2nd-round pick in 1993; 3rd-round pick in 1993
June 26, 1993	To Dallas Stars Dean Evason	To San Jose Sharks 6th-round pick in 1993
July 13, 1993	To Chicago Blackhawks Jeff Hackett	To San Jose Sharks 3rd-round pick in 1994
August 5, 1993	To Philadelphia Flyers Future considerations	To San Jose Sharks Shawn Cronin
September 10, 1993	To Edmonton Oilers Link Gaetz	To San Jose Sharks 10th-round pick in 1994
October 28, 1993	To Boston Bruins Jon Morris	To San Jose Sharks Future considerations
November 5, 1993	To Boston Bruins Dave Capuano	To San Jose Sharks Cash
January 23, 1994	To New York Islanders David Maley	To San Jose Sharks Cash
February 1, 1994	To Philadelphia Flyers Rob Zettler	To San Jose Sharks Vyacheslav Butsayev
March 19, 1994	To Dallas Stars Mike Lalor; Doug Zmolek; Cash	To San Jose Sharks Ulf Dahlen; 7th-round pick in 1995

=== Free agency ===
Date	Player	Previous team
August 10, 1993	Kip Miller	Kalamazoo Wings (IHL)
August 16, 1993	Mike Lalor	Winnipeg Jets
August 17, 1993	Bob Errey	Buffalo Sabres
August 18, 1993	Jamie Baker	Ottawa Senators
October 18, 1993	Gary Emmons	Kansas City Blades (IHL)

=== Waivers ===
Date	Player	Team
October 26, 1993	Todd Elik	from Edmonton Oilers
January 6, 1994	Mike Sullivan	to Calgary Flames

=== Departures ===
Date	Player	Via	New Team
June 10, 1993	Perry Berezan	Free agency	
June 10, 1993	Brian Hayward	Free agency	
June 10, 1993	Hubie McDonough	Free agency	San Diego Gulls (IHL)
June 10, 1993	J. F. Quintin	Free agency	Kansas City Blades (IHL)
June 24, 1993	Robin Bawa	Expansion draft	Mighty Ducks of Anaheim
June 24, 1993	David Williams	Expansion draft	Mighty Ducks of Anaheim
July 1, 1993	John Carter	Free agency	Providence Bruins (AHL)
July 1, 1993	Larry DePalma	Free agency	Atlanta Knights (IHL)
July 1, 1993	Kelly Kisio	Free agency	Calgary Flames
July 1, 1993	Dean Kolstad	Free agency	Binghamton Rangers (AHL)
July 1, 1993	Pat MacLeod	Free agency	Milwaukee Admirals (IHL)
July 1, 1993	Michel Picard	Free agency	Portland Pirates (AHL)
July 1, 1993	Claudio Scremin	Free agency	Kansas City Blades (IHL)
August 10, 1993	Mark Pederson	Release	Detroit Red Wings
September 10, 1993	Doug Wilson	Retirement	
November 1, 1993	Gary Emmons	Release	Kansas City Blades (IHL)

== Draft picks ==
=== NHL entry draft ===
San Jose's draft picks at the 1993 NHL entry draft held at the Quebec Coliseum in Quebec City, Quebec.

Round	#	Player	Position	Nationality	College/Junior/Club team
1	6	Viktor Kozlov	Center	Russia	Dynamo Moscow (Russia)
2	28	Shean Donovan	Right wing	Canada	Ottawa 67's (OHL)
2	45	Vlastimil Kroupa	Defense	Czech Republic	Chemopetrol Litvinov (Czech)
3	58	Ville Peltonen	Left wing	Finland	HIFK (SM-liiga)
4	80	Alexander Osadchy	Defense	Ukraine	CSKA Moscow (Russia)
5	106	Andrei Buschan	Defense	Ukraine	Sokil Kyiv (Ukraine)
6	132	Petri Varis	Left wing	Finland	Porin Assat (SM-liiga)
6	154	Fredrik Oduya	Defense	Sweden	Ottawa 67's (OHL)
7	158	Anatoli Filatov	Forward	Russia	Ust-Kamenogorsk Torpedo (Russia)
8	184	Todd Holt	Right wing	Canada	Swift Current Broncos (WHL)
9	210	Jonas Forsberg	Goalie	Sweden	Djurgardens IF (Elitserien)
10	236	Jeff Salajko	Goalie	Canada	Ottawa 67's (OHL)
11	262	Jamie Matthews	Center	Canada	Sudbury Wolves (OHL)

=== NHL supplemental draft ===
Round	#	Player	Position	Nationality	College/Junior/Club team
1	2	Dean Sylvester	Right wing	United States	Kent State University (NCAA)

=== NHL expansion draft ===
#	Player	Drafted from	Drafted by
17	David Williams (D)	San Jose Sharks	Mighty Ducks of Anaheim
47	Robin Bawa (RW)	San Jose Sharks	Mighty Ducks of Anaheim
