= 1993–94 Florida Panthers season =

Ice hockey team season

1993–94 Florida Panthers
- Division: 5th Atlantic
- Conference: 9th Eastern
- 1993–94 record: 33–34–17
- Home record: 15–18–9
- Road record: 18–16–8
- Goals for: 233
- Goals against: 233

Team information
- General manager: Bob Clarke
- Coach: Roger Neilson
- Captain: Brian Skrudland
- Alternate captains: Joe Cirella; Scott Mellanby
- Arena: Miami Arena
- Average attendance: 14,190
- Minor league affiliates: Cincinnati Cyclones; Birmingham Bulls

Team leaders
- Goals: Scott Mellanby (30)
- Assists: Scott Mellanby (30)
- Points: Scott Mellanby (60)
- Penalty minutes: Brent Severyn (156)
- Plus/minus: Brian Skrudland (+13)
- Wins: John Vanbiesbrouck (21)
- Goals against average: John Vanbiesbrouck (2.53)

The 1993–94 Florida Panthers season was the Panthers' first season. Blockbuster Video magnate H. Wayne Huizenga was awarded an NHL franchise for his native Miami in 1992. The team played at the Miami Arena, and its first major stars were New York Rangers goaltender castoff John Vanbiesbrouck, rookie Rob Niedermayer, and Scott Mellanby, who scored 30 goals during the regular season.

The Panthers were surprisingly competitive for a first-year expansion team, and ultimately finished just one game below .500 and two (Note: The first tiebreaker was total wins. While the Panthers finished with 83 points, and the New York Islanders 84, the Islanders won 36 games compared to the Panthers' 33.) points short of qualifying for the 1994 Stanley Cup playoffs.

== Regular season ==
=== October ===
The Panthers played their first ever regular season game on October 6, as they recorded a 4–4 tie on the road against the Chicago Blackhawks. Scott Mellanby scored the first ever Panthers goal, against Ed Belfour. On October 9, in their third game, the club earned their first victory and shutout, as John Vanbiesbrouck made 36 saves in a 2–0 win over the Tampa Bay Lightning. On October 12, Florida played their first home game, losing 2–1 to the Pittsburgh Penguins, as Mellanby scored the first goal on home ice. The Panthers first win at home came on October 14, as they defeated the Ottawa Senators 5–4, as Rob Niedermayer scored the winning goal midway through the third period. In a game against the Los Angeles Kings on October 19, the Panthers fired 52 shots at Kings goaltender Kelly Hrudey, however, the club had to settle for a 2–2 tie.

After a five-game winless streak, in which Florida posted a 0-3-2 record, the team finished October with two consecutive wins, defeating the New York Islanders 5-2 and the Tampa Bay Lightning 2–1. Florida finished the month with a 4-5-3 record, good for fifth in the Atlantic Division, and tied for eighth in the Eastern Conference.

=== November ===
Florida opened November with two consecutive losses, before heading out for a three-game road trip. Florida went a perfect 3-0-0 on the road, highlighted by a 3–1 win over the defending Stanley Cup champions, the Montreal Canadiens, as John Vanbiesbrouck led the way with 37 saves. The Panthers struggled on their five-game homestand, as they went 1–4–0, only earning a victory against the Washington Capitals. Florida ended the month on a quick two game road trip, losing to the Boston Bruins, then suffered their first ever shutout loss, as they were defeated 4–0 by the Hartford Whalers.

At the end of November, the Panthers had a record of 8–13–3, earning 19 points, and sat in sixth in the Atlantic Division, and 11th in the Eastern Conference.

=== December ===
Florida started December with a solid 2–1 overtime victory over the Buffalo Sabres, as Jesse Belanger scored the overtime winner, and John Vanbiesbrouck was solid with 33 saves. The Panthers then went on a five-game road trip, beginning with a 2–1 loss to the San Jose Sharks on December 5. On December 7, Florida faced their expansion cousins, the Mighty Ducks of Anaheim, winning the game 3–2. The next night, the Panthers defeated the Los Angeles Kings 6–5. They finished their road swing with a 5–2 win over the Winnipeg Jets and a 4–4 tie with the Dallas Stars, going 3–1–1. Florida finished the month continuing to play good hockey, going 3-1-2 in their remaining six games in December.

By the end of the month, Florida had an overall record of 15–15–6, getting 36 points, sitting in fifth place in the Atlantic Division, and 10th in the Eastern Conference, only one point out of eighth place for the final playoff position.

=== January ===
The Panthers began January where they left off in December, earning a 4–2 win over the Mighty Ducks of Anaheim on New Years Day, to move over the .500 level, and into eighth place in the Eastern Conference. The club then began a six-game road trip, which began with two losses, 3–2 to the New York Rangers, and 4–1 to the New Jersey Devils. Florida rebounded in the next two games, earning ties against the Boston Bruins and Pittsburgh Penguins. The team finished the road trip with two wins, defeating the Montreal Canadiens 5–2, and the New York Islanders 2–1, to earn a respectable 2-2-2 record. Florida continued winning when the returned home, beating the Washington Capitals 5–1 on January 19, followed by an 8–3 blowout victory against the Montreal Canadiens to push their record to 20–17–8. The club finished January going 1-0-2 in their last three games, as they extended their overall unbeaten streak to nine games.

At the end of January, the Panthers had a 21-17-10 record, earning 52 points, and were in third place in the Atlantic Division, and sixth in the Eastern Conference.

=== February ===
The team opened February with two games on the road, and in the first game on February 1, the Panthers unbeaten streak came to an end, as the Pittsburgh Penguins defeated Florida 2–1. The Panthers rebounded the next night, defeating the Ottawa Senators 4–1, as Rob Niedermayer had two goals, and Mark Fitzpatrick made 32 saves for the win. The team returned home for two games, as they were blown out 7–2 against the Buffalo Sabres on February 4, however, Florida won their next game, shutting out the Boston Bruins 3–0, with Mark Fitzpatrick making 19 saves. The Panthers lost their next game in overtime, 4–3 to the Philadelphia Flyers, as Eric Lindros scored the winning goal, however, the team followed up the heart breaking loss with a solid 4–3 win over the New York Islanders. On February 13, the Panthers defeated the Vancouver Canucks 2–1 to improve to 25-20-10 on the season.

The club then went on another quick two game road trip, where they lost both games, including a 7–3 blowout loss to the Detroit Red Wings. When returning home, the Red Wings defeated Florida again, this time by a 4–1 score, as the club was on a three-game losing streak. Florida snapped the losing streak with a 3–2 victory over the Winnipeg Jets, however, the team would lose their last three games of the month to fall back to the .500 level.

At the end of February, Florida had a 26-26-10 record, earning 62 points, which had them in fourth place in the Atlantic Division, and eighth in the Eastern Conference, tied with the Philadelphia Flyers in points, however, Florida had two games in hand.

=== March ===
Florida continued to struggle into March, losing their first two games, 3–2 to the New Jersey Devils, and 4–1 to the Hartford Whalers, to push their losing streak to four games, and seven of their last eight games. On March 7, the team began a three-game road trip to Western Canada, and they put an end to their losing streak as Mark Fitzpatrick made 34 saves in a 2–1 win over the Vancouver Canucks. In their next game against the Edmonton Oilers, the Panthers won 5–3 to go back to the .500 level. The club finished the trip with a loss to the Calgary Flames by a 4–2 score.

Florida returned home for a six-game home stand, in which the Panthers went unbeaten, going 3–0–3, which included wins over the New York Rangers, Calgary Flames and Philadelphia Flyers, making their overall season record at 31–29–13. On March 24, the Panthers nearly overcame a 4–0 deficit, losing 4–3 to the Philadelphia Flyers, to end their unbeaten streak. The club rebounded in their next game, defeating the New York Islanders 3–1. The team ended March with two more losses though, losing to the Dallas Stars and St. Louis Blues.

By the end of March, the Panthers had a 32-32-13 record, earning 77 points, which had the club in fourth place in the Atlantic Division, and clinging to eighth in the Eastern Conference for the final playoff position, four points of the ninth place Philadelphia Flyers, and five ahead of the 10th place New York Islanders.

=== April ===
The club opened April with a disappointing 2–2 tie against the lowly Ottawa Senators at home before heading out on a three-game road trip. The Panthers continued to struggle, dropping a 3-2 decision to the New York Rangers. On April 5, the Panthers blew a 3-1 third period lead against the Quebec Nordiques, and settled for a 3–3 tie, extending their winless streak to five games. On April 7, Florida overcame a 3–1 deficit, earning a 3–3 tie against the Philadelphia Flyers. The club returned home for their final three games, and the winless streak continued, as the Panthers tied the New Jersey Devils 2-2, followed by a 5–2 loss to the Quebec Nordiques, pushing their winless streak to eight games, as Florida slipped into ninth place, behind the New York Islanders. On April 13, the Panthers were officially eliminated from the post-season, as the Islanders defeated the Tampa Bay Lightning to clinch the eighth and final playoff position. The Panthers played their final game of the season on April 14, defeating the Islanders 4–1.

The Panthers finished the 1993–94 season with a 33–34–17 record, earning 83 points, which was an NHL record for points by an expansion team until the Vegas Golden Knights surpassed it in their first season. Florida finished the season in fifth place in the Atlantic Division, and ninth in the Eastern Conference, just one point of a playoff position.

=== Season standings ===
Atlantic Division
| No. | CR | | GP | W | L | T | GF | GA | Pts |
|---|---|---|---|---|---|---|---|---|---|
| 1 | 1 | **New York Rangers** | 84 | 52 | 24 | 8 | 299 | 231 | 112 |
| 2 | 3 | **New Jersey Devils** | 84 | 47 | 25 | 12 | 306 | 220 | 106 |
| 3 | 7 | **Washington Capitals** | 84 | 39 | 35 | 10 | 277 | 263 | 88 |
| 4 | 8 | **New York Islanders** | 84 | 36 | 36 | 12 | 282 | 264 | 84 |
| 5 | 9 | Florida Panthers | 84 | 33 | 34 | 17 | 233 | 233 | 83 |
| 6 | 10 | Philadelphia Flyers | 84 | 35 | 39 | 10 | 294 | 314 | 80 |
| 7 | 12 | Tampa Bay Lightning | 84 | 30 | 43 | 11 | 224 | 251 | 71 |

Note: No. = Division rank, CR = Conference rank, W = Wins, L = Losses, T = Ties, GF = Goals For, GA = Goals Against, Pts = Points
Teams that qualified for the playoffs are highlighted in bold.

Eastern Conference
| R | | GP | W | L | T | GF | GA | Pts |
|---|---|---|---|---|---|---|---|---|
| **1** | **p-New York Rangers *** | **84** | **52** | **24** | **8** | **299** | **231** | **112** |
| **2** | **x-Pittsburgh Penguins *** | **84** | **44** | **27** | **13** | **299** | **285** | **101** |
| **3** | **New Jersey Devils** | **84** | **47** | **25** | **12** | **306** | **220** | **106** |
| **4** | **Boston Bruins** | **84** | **42** | **29** | **13** | **289** | **252** | **97** |
| **5** | **Montreal Canadiens** | **84** | **41** | **29** | **14** | **283** | **248** | **96** |
| **6** | **Buffalo Sabres** | **84** | **43** | **32** | **9** | **282** | **218** | **95** |
| **7** | **Washington Capitals** | **84** | **39** | **35** | **10** | **277** | **263** | **88** |
| **8** | **New York Islanders** | **84** | **36** | **36** | **12** | **282** | **264** | **84** |
| 9 | Florida Panthers | 84 | 33 | 34 | 17 | 233 | 233 | 83 |
| 10 | Philadelphia Flyers | 84 | 35 | 39 | 10 | 294 | 314 | 80 |
| 11 | Quebec Nordiques | 84 | 34 | 42 | 8 | 277 | 292 | 76 |
| 12 | Tampa Bay Lightning | 84 | 30 | 43 | 11 | 224 | 251 | 71 |
| 13 | Hartford Whalers | 84 | 27 | 48 | 9 | 227 | 288 | 63 |
| 14 | Ottawa Senators | 84 | 14 | 61 | 9 | 201 | 397 | 37 |

| Final standings |

bold – Qualified for playoffs; x – Won division; p – Won Presidents' Trophy (and division); * – Division leader

== Schedule and results ==
1993–94 regular season
October: 4–5–3 (home: 3–3–2; road: 1–2–1)

| Game | Date | Score | Opponent | Record | Recap |
|---|---|---|---|---|---|
| 1 | October 6, 1993 | 4–4 OT | @ Chicago Blackhawks (1993–94) | 0–0–1 | T |
| 2 | October 7, 1993 | 3–5 | @ St. Louis Blues (1993–94) | 0–1–1 | L |
| 3 | October 9, 1993 | 2–0 | @ Tampa Bay Lightning (1993–94) | 1–1–1 | W |
| 4 | October 12, 1993 | 1–2 | Pittsburgh Penguins (1993–94) | 1–2–1 | L |
| 5 | October 14, 1993 | 5–4 | Ottawa Senators (1993–94) | 2–2–1 | W |
| 6 | October 17, 1993 | 3–3 OT | Tampa Bay Lightning (1993–94) | 2–2–2 | T |
| 7 | October 19, 1993 | 2–2 OT | Los Angeles Kings (1993–94) | 2–2–3 | T |
| 8 | October 21, 1993 | 3–4 OT | Toronto Maple Leafs (1993–94) | 2–3–3 | L |
| 9 | October 23, 1993 | 1–2 | @ New Jersey Devils (1993–94) | 2–4–3 | L |
| 10 | October 26, 1993 | 2–5 | Winnipeg Jets (1993–94) | 2–5–3 | L |
| 11 | October 28, 1993 | 5–2 | New York Islanders (1993–94) | 3–5–3 | W |
| 12 | October 30, 1993 | 2–1 OT | Tampa Bay Lightning (1993–94) | 4–5–3 | W |

November: 4–8–0 (home: 1–5–0; road: 3–3–0)

| Game | Date | Score | Opponent | Record | Recap |
|---|---|---|---|---|---|
| 13 | November 2, 1993 | 3–4 | Philadelphia Flyers (1993–94) | 4–6–3 | L |
| 14 | November 3, 1993 | 3–6 | @ Toronto Maple Leafs (1993–94) | 4–7–3 | L |
| 15 | November 7, 1993 | 3–1 | @ Quebec Nordiques (1993–94) | 5–7–3 | W |
| 16 | November 10, 1993 | 3–1 | @ Montreal Canadiens (1993–94) | 6–7–3 | W |
| 17 | November 11, 1993 | 5–4 | @ Ottawa Senators (1993–94) | 7–7–3 | W |
| 18 | November 14, 1993 | 2–5 | Quebec Nordiques (1993–94) | 7–8–3 | L |
| 19 | November 16, 1993 | 2–4 | New York Rangers (1993–94) | 7–9–3 | L |
| 20 | November 18, 1993 | 2–3 | Chicago Blackhawks (1993–94) | 7–10–3 | L |
| 21 | November 20, 1993 | 4–3 | Washington Capitals (1993–94) | 8–10–3 | W |
| 22 | November 23, 1993 | 1–2 OT | Hartford Whalers (1993–94) | 8–11–3 | L |
| 23 | November 26, 1993 | 2–3 | @ Boston Bruins (1993–94) | 8–12–3 | L |
| 24 | November 27, 1993 | 0–4 | @ Hartford Whalers (1993–94) | 8–13–3 | L |

December: 7–2–3 (home: 2–1–1; road: 5–1–2)

| Game | Date | Score | Opponent | Record | Recap |
|---|---|---|---|---|---|
| 25 | December 2, 1993 | 2–1 OT | Buffalo Sabres (1993–94) | 9–13–3 | W |
| 26 | December 5, 1993 | 1–2 | @ San Jose Sharks (1993–94) | 9–14–3 | L |
| 27 | December 7, 1993 | 3–2 | @ Mighty Ducks of Anaheim (1993–94) | 10–14–3 | W |
| 28 | December 8, 1993 | 6–5 | @ Los Angeles Kings (1993–94) | 11–14–3 | W |
| 29 | December 10, 1993 | 5–2 | @ Winnipeg Jets (1993–94) | 12–14–3 | W |
| 30 | December 12, 1993 | 4–4 OT | @ Dallas Stars (1993–94) | 12–14–4 | T |
| 31 | December 15, 1993 | 3–3 OT | Montreal Canadiens (1993–94) | 12–14–5 | T |
| 32 | December 19, 1993 | 1–2 OT | Boston Bruins (1993–94) | 12–15–5 | L |
| 33 | December 22, 1993 | 3–2 | New York Rangers (1993–94) | 13–15–5 | W |
| 34 | December 26, 1993 | 3–1 | @ Tampa Bay Lightning (1993–94) | 14–15–5 | W |
| 35 | December 28, 1993 | 3–3 OT | @ Washington Capitals (1993–94) | 14–15–6 | T |
| 36 | December 29, 1993 | 5–3 | @ Hartford Whalers (1993–94) | 15–15–6 | W |

January: 6–2–4 (home: 3–0–1; road: 3–2–3)

| Game | Date | Score | Opponent | Record | Recap |
|---|---|---|---|---|---|
| 37 | January 1, 1994 | 4–2 | Mighty Ducks of Anaheim (1993–94) | 16–15–6 | W |
| 38 | January 3, 1994 | 2–3 | @ New York Rangers (1993–94) | 16–16–6 | L |
| 39 | January 7, 1994 | 1–4 | @ New Jersey Devils (1993–94) | 16–17–6 | L |
| 40 | January 8, 1994 | 2–2 OT | @ Boston Bruins (1993–94) | 16–17–7 | T |
| 41 | January 13, 1994 | 2–2 OT | @ Pittsburgh Penguins (1993–94) | 16–17–8 | T |
| 42 | January 15, 1994 | 5–2 | @ Montreal Canadiens (1993–94) | 17–17–8 | W |
| 43 | January 17, 1994 | 2–1 | @ New York Islanders (1993–94) | 18–17–8 | W |
| 44 | January 19, 1994 | 5–1 | Washington Capitals (1993–94) | 19–17–8 | W |
| 45 | January 24, 1994 | 8–3 | Montreal Canadiens (1993–94) | 20–17–8 | W |
| 46 | January 26, 1994 | 1–1 OT | @ Tampa Bay Lightning (1993–94) | 20–17–9 | T |
| 47 | January 28, 1994 | 3–3 OT | San Jose Sharks (1993–94) | 20–17–10 | T |
| 48 | January 30, 1994 | 3–2 | @ Buffalo Sabres (1993–94) | 21–17–10 | W |

February: 5–9–0 (home: 2–4–0; road: 3–5–0)

| Game | Date | Score | Opponent | Record | Recap |
|---|---|---|---|---|---|
| 49 | February 1, 1994 | 1–2 | @ Pittsburgh Penguins (1993–94) | 21–18–10 | L |
| 50 | February 2, 1994 | 4–1 | @ Ottawa Senators (1993–94) | 22–18–10 | W |
| 51 | February 4, 1994 | 2–7 | Buffalo Sabres (1993–94) | 22–19–10 | L |
| 52 | February 6, 1994 | 3–0 | Boston Bruins (1993–94) | 23–19–10 | W |
| 53 | February 10, 1994 | 3–4 OT | @ Philadelphia Flyers (1993–94) | 23–20–10 | L |
| 54 | February 12, 1994 | 4–3 | @ New York Islanders (1993–94) | 24–20–10 | W |
| 55 | February 13, 1994 | 2–1 | Vancouver Canucks (1993–94) | 25–20–10 | W |
| 56 | February 16, 1994 | 3–7 | @ Detroit Red Wings (1993–94) | 25–21–10 | L |
| 57 | February 18, 1994 | 1–4 | @ Buffalo Sabres (1993–94) | 25–22–10 | L |
| 58 | February 20, 1994 | 3–4 OT | Detroit Red Wings (1993–94) | 25–23–10 | L |
| 59 | February 22, 1994 | 3–2 | @ Winnipeg Jets (1993–94) | 26–23–10 | W |
| 60 | February 24, 1994 | 1–2 | Washington Capitals (1993–94) | 26–24–10 | L |
| 61 | February 26, 1994 | 2–4 | @ Washington Capitals (1993–94) | 26–25–10 | L |
| 62 | February 28, 1994 | 3–4 | Pittsburgh Penguins (1993–94) | 26–26–10 | L |

March: 6–6–3 (home: 3–4–3; road: 3–2–0)

| Game | Date | Score | Opponent | Record | Recap |
|---|---|---|---|---|---|
| 63 | March 2, 1994 | 2–3 | New Jersey Devils (1993–94) | 26–27–10 | L |
| 64 | March 4, 1994 | 1–2 | Hartford Whalers (1993–94) | 26–28–10 | L |
| 65 | March 7, 1994 | 2–1 | @ Vancouver Canucks (1993–94) | 27–28–10 | W |
| 66 | March 9, 1994 | 5–3 | @ Edmonton Oilers (1993–94) | 28–28–10 | W |
| 67 | March 11, 1994 | 2–4 | @ Calgary Flames (1993–94) | 28–29–10 | L |
| 68 | March 14, 1994 | 2–1 | New York Rangers (1993–94) | 29–29–10 | W |
| 69 | March 16, 1994 | 2–1 | Calgary Flames (1993–94) | 30–29–10 | W |
| 70 | March 18, 1994 | 4–4 OT | Edmonton Oilers (1993–94) | 30–29–11 | T |
| 71 | March 20, 1994 | 5–3 | Philadelphia Flyers (1993–94) | 31–29–11 | W |
| 72 | March 21, 1994 | 3–3 OT | New Jersey Devils (1993–94) | 31–29–12 | T |
| 73 | March 23, 1994 | 1–1 OT | Toronto Maple Leafs (1993–94) | 31–29–13 | T |
| 74 | March 24, 1994 | 3–4 | @ Philadelphia Flyers (1993–94) | 31–30–13 | L |
| 75 | March 26, 1994 | 3–1 | @ New York Islanders (1993–94) | 32–30–13 | W |
| 76 | March 28, 1994 | 4–5 | Dallas Stars (1993–94) | 32–31–13 | L |
| 77 | March 30, 1994 | 1–3 | St. Louis Blues (1993–94) | 32–32–13 | L |

April: 1–2–4 (home: 1–1–2; road: 0–1–2)

| Game | Date | Score | Opponent | Record | Recap |
|---|---|---|---|---|---|
| 78 | April 2, 1994 | 2–2 OT | Ottawa Senators (1993–94) | 32–32–14 | T |
| 79 | April 4, 1994 | 2–3 | @ New York Rangers (1993–94) | 32–33–14 | L |
| 80 | April 5, 1994 | 3–3 OT | @ Quebec Nordiques (1993–94) | 32–33–15 | T |
| 81 | April 7, 1994 | 3–3 OT | @ Philadelphia Flyers (1993–94) | 32–33–16 | T |
| 82 | April 10, 1994 | 2–2 OT | New Jersey Devils (1993–94) | 32–33–17 | T |
| 83 | April 12, 1994 | 2–5 | Quebec Nordiques (1993–94) | 32–34–17 | L |
| 84 | April 14, 1994 | 4–1 | New York Islanders (1993–94) | 33–34–17 | W |

Legend: W Win (2 points) L Loss (0 points) T Tie (1 point)

== Player statistics ==
=== Forwards ===
Note: GP = Games played; G = Goals; A = Assists; Pts = Points; PIM = Penalty minutes

| Player | GP | G | A | Pts | PIM |
|---|---|---|---|---|---|
| Scott Mellanby | 80 | 30 | 30 | 60 | 149 |
| Jesse Belanger | 70 | 17 | 33 | 50 | 16 |
| Andrei Lomakin | 76 | 19 | 28 | 47 | 26 |
| Brian Skrudland | 79 | 15 | 25 | 40 | 136 |
| Stu Barnes | 59 | 18 | 20 | 38 | 30 |
| Dave Lowry | 80 | 15 | 22 | 37 | 64 |
| Tom Fitzgerald | 83 | 18 | 14 | 32 | 54 |
| Bob Kudelski | 44 | 14 | 15 | 29 | 10 |
| Mike Hough | 78 | 6 | 23 | 29 | 62 |
| Jody Hull | 69 | 13 | 13 | 26 | 8 |
| Rob Niedermayer | 65 | 9 | 17 | 26 | 51 |
| Bill Lindsay | 84 | 6 | 6 | 12 | 97 |
| Scott Levins | 29 | 5 | 6 | 11 | 69 |
| Mike Foligno | 39 | 4 | 5 | 9 | 49 |
| Randy Gilhen | 20 | 4 | 4 | 8 | 16 |
| Evgeny Davydov | 21 | 2 | 6 | 8 | 8 |
| Patrick Lebeau | 4 | 1 | 1 | 2 | 4 |
| Jamie Leach | 2 | 1 | 0 | 1 | 0 |
| Jeff Greenlaw | 4 | 0 | 1 | 1 | 2 |
| Doug Barrault | 2 | 0 | 0 | 0 | 0 |
| Len Barrie | 2 | 0 | 0 | 0 | 0 |
| Jeff Daniels | 7 | 0 | 0 | 0 | 0 |

=== Defensemen ===
Note: GP = Games played; G = Goals; A = Assists; Pts = Points; PIM = Penalty minutes

| Player | GP | G | A | Pts | PIM |
|---|---|---|---|---|---|
| Gord Murphy | 84 | 14 | 29 | 43 | 71 |
| Brian Benning | 73 | 6 | 24 | 30 | 107 |
| Greg Hawgood | 33 | 2 | 14 | 16 | 9 |
| Keith Brown | 51 | 4 | 8 | 12 | 60 |
| Brent Severyn | 67 | 4 | 7 | 11 | 156 |
| Alexander Godynyuk | 26 | 0 | 10 | 10 | 35 |
| Joe Cirella | 63 | 1 | 9 | 10 | 99 |
| Geoff Smith | 56 | 1 | 5 | 6 | 38 |
| Peter Andersson | 8 | 1 | 1 | 2 | 0 |
| Paul Laus | 39 | 2 | 0 | 2 | 109 |
| Stephane Richer | 2 | 0 | 1 | 1 | 0 |
| Greg Smyth | 12 | 1 | 0 | 1 | 37 |
| Dallas Eakins | 1 | 0 | 0 | 0 | 0 |

=== Goaltending ===
Note: GP = Games played; W = Wins; L = Losses; T = Ties; SV% = Save percentage; GAA = Goals against average; SO = Shutouts

| Player | GP | W | L | T | SV% | GAA | SO |
|---|---|---|---|---|---|---|---|
| John Vanbiesbrouck | 57 | 21 | 25 | 11 | .924 | 2.53 | 1 |
| Mark Fitzpatrick | 28 | 12 | 8 | 6 | .914 | 2.73 | 1 |
| Pokey Reddick | 2 | 0 | 1 | 0 | .822 | 6.00 | 0 |

== Awards and records ==
- John Vanbiesbrouck, Goaltender, NHL Second Team All-Star
- John Vanbiesbrouck, runner-up, Hart Memorial Trophy
- John Vanbiesbrouck, runner-up, Vezina Trophy

== Transactions ==
=== Trades ===
Trades listed are from June 1, 1993, to June 1, 1994.

| Date | Details | |
|---|---|---|
| June 25, 1993 | To Tampa Bay Lightning Panthers agree to select Daren Puppa in 1993 NHL expansion draft | To Florida Panthers 1993 PIT 3rd-round Pick (#78 overall) |
| June 26, 1993 | To Winnipeg Jets 1993 2rd-round Pick (#31 overall) | To Florida Panthers 1993 2nd-round Pick (#41 overall); 1993 3rd-round Pick (#67 overall) |
| July 30, 1993 | To Toronto Maple Leafs Cash | To Florida Panthers Dave Tomlinson |
| August 3, 1993 | To Winnipeg Jets Dave Tomlinson | To Florida Panthers Jason Cirone |
| September 30, 1993 | To Winnipeg Jets 1994 4th-round Pick (#79 overall) | To Florida Panthers Evgeny Davydov; 1994 Conditional 4th-round Pick |
| September 30, 1993 | To Chicago Blackhawks Darin Kimble | To Florida Panthers Keith Brown |
| October 3, 1993 | To Winnipeg Jets Milan Tichy | To Florida Panthers Brent Severyn |
| November 5, 1993 | To Toronto Maple Leafs Cash | To Florida Panthers Mike Foligno |
| November 25, 1993 | To Winnipeg Jets Randy Gilhen; 1994 4th-round Pick | To Florida Panthers Stu Barnes; 1994 STL 6th-round Pick (#146 overall) |
| November 28, 1993 | To Philadelphia Flyers Cash | To Florida Panthers Greg Hawgood |
| December 6, 1993 | To Edmonton Oilers 1994 3rd-round Pick (#53 overall); 1994 STL 6th-round Pick (#146 overall) | To Florida Panthers Geoff Smith; 1994 4th-round Pick (#84 overall) |
| December 7, 1993 | To Toronto Maple Leafs Greg Smyth | To Florida Panthers Future Considerations (Cash) |
| December 16, 1993 | To Hartford Whalers Alexander Godynyuk | To Florida Panthers Jim McKenzie |
| December 16, 1993 | To Dallas Stars Jim McKenzie | To Florida Panthers 1995 4th-round Pick (#89 overall) |
| January 6, 1994 | To Ottawa Senators Scott Levins; Evgeny Davydov; 1994 6th-round Pick (#131 overall); 1995 DAL 4th-round Pick (#89 overall) | To Florida Panthers Bob Kudelski |
| March 19, 1994 | To Pittsburgh Penguins Greg Hawgood | To Florida Panthers Jeff Daniels |
| March 21, 1994 | To Ottawa Senators 1994 9th-round Pick (#209 overall) | To Florida Panthers Peter Andersson |

=== Free agents ===
| Date | Player | Team |
|---|---|---|
| July 8, 1993 | Dallas Eakins | from Winnipeg Jets |
| July 9, 1993 | Darin Kimble | from Boston Bruins |
| July 12, 1993 | Pokey Reddick | from Edmonton Oilers |
| July 13, 1993 | Brian Benning | from Edmonton Oilers |
| July 14, 1993 | Daniel Gauthier | |
| July 14, 1993 | Greg Smyth | from Calgary Flames |
| July 14, 1993 | Jeff Greenlaw | |
| July 20, 1993 | Jeff Serowik | |
| July 20, 1993 | Len Barrie | from Philadelphia Flyers |
| July 26, 1993 | Patrick Lebeau | |
| August 10, 1993 | Jody Hull | from Ottawa Senators |
| August 31, 1993 | Jamie Leach | |
| October 4, 1993 | Jamie Linden | |
| October 4, 1993 | Brad Smyth | |

=== Signings ===
| Date | Player | Contract term |
|---|---|---|
| June 2, 1994 | Dallas Eakins | multi-year |
| June 2, 1994 | Doug Barrault | multi-year |

=== Retirement ===
| Date | Player |
|---|---|
| July 1, 1993 | Pete Stauber |

== Draft picks ==
=== Expansion Draft ===
| # | Player | Position | Drafted from |
|---|---|---|---|
| 1 | John Vanbiesbrouck | G | Vancouver Canucks |
| 4 | Mark Fitzpatrick | G | Quebec Nordiques |
| 5 | Daren Puppa ^{1} | G | Toronto Maple Leafs |
| 7 | Milan Tichy | D | Chicago Blackhawks |
| 10 | Paul Laus | D | Pittsburgh Penguins |
| 12 | Joe Cirella | D | New York Rangers |
| 13 | Alexander Godynyuk | D | Calgary Flames |
| 15 | Gord Murphy | D | Dallas Stars |
| 18 | Steve Bancroft | D | Winnipeg Jets |
| 20 | Stephane Richer | D | Boston Bruins |
| 21 | Gord Hynes | D | Philadelphia Flyers |
| 24 | Tom Fitzgerald | C/RW | New York Islanders |
| 25 | Jesse Belanger | C | Montreal Canadiens |
| 27 | Scott Levins | C | Winnipeg Jets |
| 30 | Scott Mellanby | RW | Edmonton Oilers |
| 32 | Brian Skrudland | C | Calgary Flames |
| 33 | Mike Hough | LW | Washington Capitals |
| 35 | Dave Lowry | LW | St. Louis Blues |
| 38 | Bill Lindsay | LW | Quebec Nordiques |
| 40 | Andrei Lomakin | RW | Philadelphia Flyers |
| 41 | Randy Gilhen | C | Tampa Bay Lightning |
| 43 | Doug Barrault | LW | Dallas Stars |
| 46 | Marc Labelle | LW | Ottawa Senators |
| 48 | Pete Stauber | LW | Detroit Red Wings |

Notes

1. Lost in Expansion Draft phase two to the Tampa Bay Lightning.

=== NHL draft ===
Florida's draft picks at the 1993 NHL entry draft held at the Quebec Coliseum in Quebec City, Quebec.

| Round | Pick | Player | Position | Nationality | College/junior/club team |
|---|---|---|---|---|---|
| 1 | 5 | Rob Niedermayer | C | Canada | Medicine Hat Tigers (WHL) |
| 2^{1} | 41 | Kevin Weekes | G | Canada | Owen Sound Platers (OHL) |
| 3 | 57 | Chris Armstrong | D | Canada | Moose Jaw Warriors (WHL) |
| 3^{1} | 67 | Mikael Tjallden | D | Sweden | MODO (Elitserien) |
| 3^{2} | 78 | Steve Washburn | C | Canada | Ottawa 67's (OHL) |
| 4 | 83 | Bill McCauley | C | United States | Detroit Junior Red Wings (OHL) |
| 5 | 109 | Todd MacDonald | G | Canada | Tacoma Rockets (WHL) |
| 6 | 135 | Alain Nasreddine | D | Canada | Drummondville Voltigeurs (QMJHL) |
| 7 | 161 | Trevor Doyle | D | Canada | Kingston Frontenacs (OHL) |
| 8 | 187 | Briane Thompson | D | Canada | Sault Ste. Marie Greyhounds (OHL) |
| 9 | 213 | Chad Cabana | LW | Canada | Tri-City Americans (WHL) |
| 10 | 239 | John Demarco | D | United States | Archbishop Williams High School (USHS-MA) |
| 11 | 265 | Eric Montreuil | C | Canada | Chicoutimi Sagueneens (QMJHL) |
| S | 4 | Chris Imes | D | United States | University of Maine (Hockey East) |

Notes

1. The Panthers acquired these picks as the result of a trade on June 26, 1993, that sent a second-round pick in 1993 (31st overall) to Winnipeg in exchange for these picks.
2. The Panthers acquired this pick as the result of a trade on June 25, 1993, that agreed that Florida selected Darren Puppa in the 1993 NHL Expansion Draft to Tampa Bay in exchange for this pick.
  Tampa Bay previously acquired this pick as the result of a trade on March 22, 1993, that sent Peter Taglianetti to Pittsburgh in exchange for this pick.
- The Panthers second-round pick went to the Winnipeg Jets as the result of a trade on June 26, 1993, that sent a second and third-round pick both in 1993 (41st and 67th overall) to Florida in exchange for this pick (31st overall).
