= Rudy Poeschek =

Canadian ice hockey player

- Born: September 29, 1966 (age 59) Kamloops, British Columbia, Canada
- Height: 6 ft 2 in (188 cm)
- Weight: 208 lb (94 kg; 14 st 12 lb)
- Position: Defence
- Shot: Right
- Played for: New York Rangers; Winnipeg Jets; Tampa Bay Lightning; St. Louis Blues
- NHL draft: 238th overall, 1985; New York Rangers
- Playing career: 1987–2001

Rudolph Leopold "Pot Pie" Poeschek (born September 29, 1966) is a Canadian former professional ice hockey player who played in the National Hockey League (NHL) with the New York Rangers, Winnipeg Jets, Tampa Bay Lightning, and St. Louis Blues. He played defence, shot right-handed, and was known for his toughness.

== Career ==
Poeschek was drafted by the New York Rangers in the 12th round, 238th overall in the 1985 NHL Entry Draft. He played for the Kamloops Blazers in the WHL for three years and there he established himself as a tough enforcer willing to drop his gloves with anybody. During the 1987–1988 season Poeschek finally played his first game with the Rangers. The following season he played in 52 games with the Rangers and registered a career high 199 penalty minutes.

Prior to the 1993–1994 season, the Tampa Bay Lightning picked up Poeschek and it was there that he developed his reputation as an enforcer to be reckoned with, dropping his gloves with the likes of Bob Probert and Craig Berube. Poeschek played four seasons with the Lightning before being picked up by the St. Louis Blues. He played a full year there along with parts of two other seasons and one more with the Houston Aeros of the IHL before retiring after 2000–2001 season.

== Career statistics ==
=== Regular season and playoffs ===
			Regular season					Playoffs
Season	Team	League	GP	G	A	Pts	PIM	GP	G	A	Pts	PIM
1982–83	Vernon Lakers	BCJHL	54	4	10	14	100	—	—	—	—	—
1983–84	Kamloops Junior Oilers	WHL	47	3	9	12	93	8	0	2	2	7
1984–85	Kamloops Blazers	WHL	34	6	7	13	100	15	0	3	3	56
1985–86	Kamloops Blazers	WHL	32	3	13	16	92	16	3	7	10	40
1986–87	Kamloops Blazers	WHL	54	13	18	31	153	13	1	4	5	39
1987–88	Colorado Rangers	IHL	82	7	31	38	210	12	2	2	4	31
1987–88	New York Rangers	NHL	1	0	0	0	2	—	—	—	—	—
1988–89	Denver Rangers	IHL	2	0	0	0	6	—	—	—	—	—
1988–89	New York Rangers	NHL	52	0	2	2	199	—	—	—	—	—
1989–90	Flint Spirits	IHL	38	8	13	21	109	4	0	0	0	16
1989–90	New York Rangers	NHL	15	0	0	0	55	—	—	—	—	—
1990–91	Binghamton Rangers	AHL	38	1	3	4	162	—	—	—	—	—
1990–91	Moncton Hawks	AHL	23	2	4	6	67	9	1	1	2	41
1990–91	Winnipeg Jets	NHL	1	0	0	0	5	—	—	—	—	—
1991–92	Moncton Hawks	AHL	63	4	18	22	170	11	0	2	2	46
1991–92	Winnipeg Jets	NHL	4	0	0	0	17	—	—	—	—	—
1992–93	St. John's Maple Leafs	AHL	78	7	24	31	189	9	0	4	4	13
1993–94	Tampa Bay Lightning	NHL	71	3	6	9	118	—	—	—	—	—
1994–95	Tampa Bay Lightning	NHL	25	1	1	2	92	—	—	—	—	—
1995–96	Tampa Bay Lightning	NHL	57	1	3	4	88	3	0	0	0	12
1996–97	Tampa Bay Lightning	NHL	60	0	6	6	120	—	—	—	—	—
1997–98	St. Louis Blues	NHL	50	1	7	8	64	2	0	0	0	6
1998–99	St. Louis Blues	NHL	16	0	0	0	33	—	—	—	—	—
1999–00	Worcester IceCats	AHL	5	0	0	0	4	—	—	—	—	—
1999–00	Houston Aeros	IHL	32	2	6	8	51	—	—	—	—	—
1999–00	St. Louis Blues	NHL	12	0	0	0	24	—	—	—	—	—
2000–01	Houston Aeros	IHL	67	3	13	16	66	7	0	0	0	8
NHL totals			364	6	25	31	817	5	0	0	0	18
