= Vlastimil Kroupa =

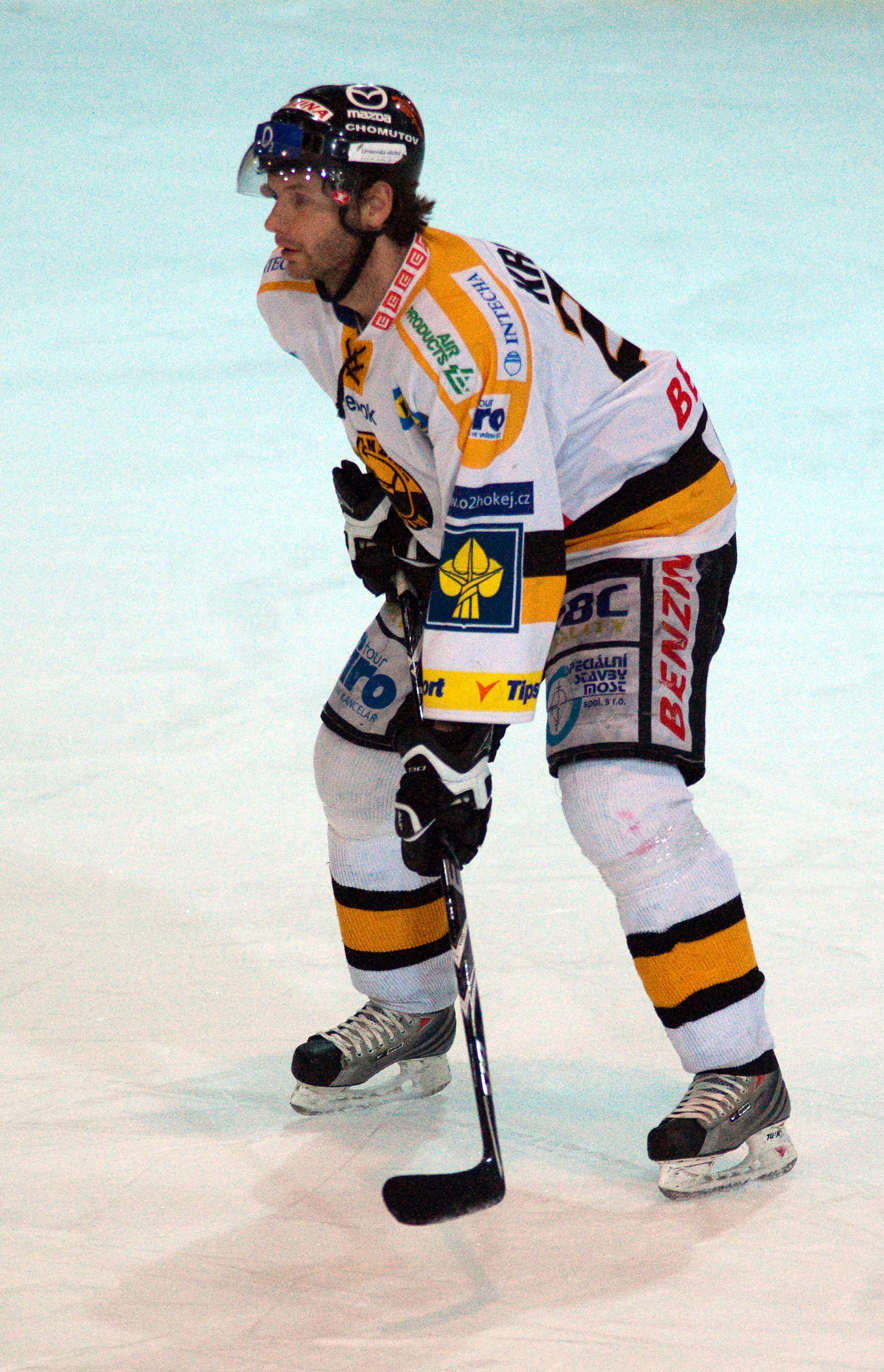
- Born: April 27, 1975 (age 51) Most, Czechoslovakia
- Height: 6 ft 5 in (196 cm)
- Weight: 202 lb (92 kg; 14 st 6 lb)
- Position: Defence
- Shot: Left
- Czech Extraliga team Former teams: HC Oceláři Třinec; San Jose Sharks; New Jersey Devils
- NHL draft: 45th overall, 1993; San Jose Sharks
- Playing career: 1992–2011

Vlastimil Kroupa (born April 27, 1975) is a retired Czech professional ice hockey defenceman. Chosen in the second round of the 1993 NHL entry draft, 45th overall, by the San Jose Sharks, Kroupa played in parts of 5 seasons with the San Jose Sharks and New Jersey Devils. A tall and skilled defenceman, Kroupa was known for a puck-moving transitional style and a heavy point shot. However, he struggled with the longer NHL season (in comparison to Europe), as well as the more rugged and tough physical aspects of the North American game. After several seasons in the late 1990s spent mostly in the AHL refining his game, Kroupa elected to return to play in his native Czech Republic before the start of the 2000–01 season.

== Career statistics ==
=== Regular season and playoffs ===
			Regular season					Playoffs
Season	Team	League	GP	G	A	Pts	PIM	GP	G	A	Pts	PIM
1989–90	HC Litvínov	CSSR U16	—	—	—	—	—	—	—	—	—	—
1990–91	HC Litvínov	CSSR U16	—	—	—	—	—	—	—	—	—	—
1991–92	HC Litvínov	CSSR U18	37	7	12	19	—	—	—	—	—	—
1992–93	HC Litvínov	CZE U18	—	—	—	—	—	—	—	—	—	—
1992–93	HC Litvínov	CSSR	10	0	1	1	0	—	—	—	—	—
1993–94	San Jose Sharks	NHL	27	1	3	4	20	14	1	2	3	21
1993–94	Kansas City Blades	IHL	39	3	12	15	12	—	—	—	—	—
1994–95	San Jose Sharks	NHL	14	0	2	2	16	6	0	0	0	4
1994–95	Kansas City Blades	IHL	51	4	8	12	49	12	2	4	6	22
1995–96	San Jose Sharks	NHL	27	1	7	8	18	—	—	—	—	—
1995–96	Kansas City Blades	IHL	39	5	22	27	44	5	0	1	1	6
1996–97	San Jose Sharks	NHL	35	2	6	8	12	—	—	—	—	—
1996–97	Kentucky Thoroughblades	AHL	5	0	3	3	0	—	—	—	—	—
1997–98	New Jersey Devils	NHL	2	0	1	1	0	—	—	—	—	—
1997–98	Albany River Rats	AHL	71	5	29	34	48	12	0	3	3	6
1998–99	Albany River Rats	AHL	2	0	1	1	4	—	—	—	—	—
1998–99	Kansas City Blades	IHL	77	6	32	38	52	3	0	1	1	0
1999–00	Albany River Rats	AHL	1	1	0	1	0	—	—	—	—	—
1999–00	Moskitos Essen	DEL	48	5	12	17	46	—	—	—	—	—
2000–01	Sparta Praha	CZE	47	3	2	5	32	13	0	1	1	22
2001–02	HC Chemopetrol Litvínov	CZE	48	6	3	9	98	—	—	—	—	—
2002–03	HC Chemopetrol Litvínov	CZE	50	8	12	20	90	—	—	—	—	—
2003–04	HC Chemopetrol Litvínov	CZE	49	3	10	13	46	—	—	—	—	—
2004–05	HC Chemopetrol Litvínov	CZE	45	2	4	6	26	6	0	0	0	6
2005–06	HC Oceláři Třinec	CZE	52	1	4	5	36	4	1	0	1	8
2006–07	HC Oceláři Třinec	CZE	52	6	7	13	80	10	1	3	4	26
2007–08	HC Oceláři Třinec	CZE	28	0	2	2	38	—	—	—	—	—
2008–09	HC Litvínov	CZE	52	4	6	10	54	4	1	0	1	14
2009–10	HC Litvínov	CZE	50	4	18	22	70	—	—	—	—	—
2010–11	HC Litvínov	CZE	26	1	2	3	46	—	—	—	—	—
AHL totals			245	59	98	157	494	23	5	6	11	57
CZE totals			509	38	71	109	616	37	3	4	7	76
NHL totals			105	4	19	23	66	20	1	2	3	25

=== International ===
Year	Team	Event	GP	G	A	Pts	PIM
1993	Czech Republic	EJC	6	1	0	1	4
1995	Czech Republic	WJC	7	4	2	6	10
1997	Czech Republic	WC	9	0	4	4	10
Junior totals			13	5	2	7	14
Senior totals			9	0	4	4	10
