= Marc Potvin =

Canadian ice hockey player (1967–2006)

- Born: January 29, 1967 Ottawa, Ontario, Canada
- Died: January 13, 2006 (aged 38) Kalamazoo, Michigan, U.S.
- Height: 6 ft 1 in (185 cm)
- Weight: 200 lb (91 kg; 14 st 4 lb)
- Position: Right wing
- Shot: Right
- Played for: Detroit Red Wings; Los Angeles Kings; Hartford Whalers; Boston Bruins
- NHL draft: 169th overall, 1986; Detroit Red Wings
- Playing career: 1990–1998

Marc Potvin (January 29, 1967 – January 13, 2006) was a Canadian professional ice hockey player who played 121 games in the National Hockey League (NHL) between 1990 and 1996. The rest of his career, which lasted from 1990 to 1998, was mainly spent in the minor American Hockey League (AHL). After his playing career Potvin became a coach in the minor leagues, until his suicide in 2006. He was the cousin of Denis Potvin and Jean Potvin.

== Playing career ==
Born in Ottawa, Ontario, Potvin, second cousin of Hall of Famer Denis Potvin, was selected by the Detroit Red Wings in the ninth round, 169th overall, in the 1986 NHL entry draft. During his career, he played for four different NHL teams: the Red Wings (1990–91 to 1991–92), Los Angeles Kings (1992–93 to 1993–94), Hartford Whalers (1993–94), and Boston Bruins (1994–95 to 1995–96). In 121 NHL games, he scored 3 goals and had 5 assists for 8 points. He also amassed 456 penalty minutes. In 13 NHL playoff games, he scored no goals, had one assist and 50 penalty minutes.

== Coaching career ==
For the 1998–99 season, Potvin was the assistant coach for the Adirondack Red Wings of the American Hockey League. The next season, he made the jump to head coach for the Mississippi Sea Wolves of the ECHL. After only one season there, he became the head coach of the Springfield Falcons of the AHL, where he stayed for two seasons. Part way through the 2003–04 season, he took over the head coach position of the Adirondack IceHawks in the UHL. He would continue coaching the team (renamed the Adirondack Frostbite) in Glens Falls, New York.

== Death ==
On January 13, 2006, Potvin was found dead in his hotel room in Kalamazoo, Michigan, hours before the Frostbite were to play the Kalamazoo Wings. On February 10, Kalamazoo police announced that his death had been ruled a suicide. It was discovered that he had hanged himself in his hotel bathroom. He had a wife, a son, and a daughter.

== Career statistics ==
=== Regular season and playoffs ===
			Regular season					Playoffs
Season	Team	League	GP	G	A	Pts	PIM	GP	G	A	Pts	PIM
1984–85	Elmira Sugar Kings	MWJHL	37	21	22	43	108	—	—	—	—	—
1985–86	Stratford Cullitons	MWJHL	39	22	43	65	180	—	—	—	—	—
1986–87	Bowling Green State University	CCHA	43	5	15	20	74	—	—	—	—	—
1987–88	Bowling Green State University	CCHA	45	15	21	36	80	—	—	—	—	—
1988–89	Bowling Green State University	CCHA	46	23	12	35	63	—	—	—	—	—
1989–90	Bowling Green State University	CCHA	40	19	17	36	72	—	—	—	—	—
1989–90	Adirondack Red Wings	AHL	5	2	1	3	9	4	0	1	1	23
1990–91	Detroit Red Wings	NHL	9	0	0	0	55	6	0	0	0	32
1990–91	Adirondack Red Wings	AHL	63	9	13	22	365	—	—	—	—	—
1991–92	Detroit Red Wings	NHL	5	1	0	1	52	1	0	0	0	0
1991–92	Adirondack Red Wings	AHL	51	13	16	29	314	19	5	4	9	57
1992–93	Adirondack Red Wings	AHL	37	8	12	20	109	—	—	—	—	—
1992–93	Los Angeles Kings	NHL	20	0	1	1	61	1	0	0	0	0
1993–94	Los Angeles Kings	NHL	3	0	0	0	26	—	—	—	—	—
1993–94	Hartford Whalers	NHL	51	2	3	5	246	—	—	—	—	—
1994–95	Boston Bruins	NHL	6	0	1	1	4	—	—	—	—	—
1994–95	Providence Bruins	AHL	21	4	14	18	84	12	2	4	6	25
1995–96	Boston Bruins	NHL	27	0	0	0	12	5	0	1	1	18
1995–96	Providence Bruins	AHL	48	9	9	18	118	—	—	—	—	—
1996–97	Portland Pirates	AHL	71	17	15	32	222	5	0	0	0	12
1997–98	Chicago Wolves	IHL	81	4	8	12	170	10	0	0	0	22
AHL totals			296	62	80	142	1221	40	7	9	16	117
NHL totals			121	3	5	8	456	13	0	1	1	50
