= 1993–94 Winnipeg Jets season =

NHL hockey team season

1993–94 Winnipeg Jets
- Division: 6th Central
- Conference: 12th Western
- 1993–94 record: 24–51–9
- Home record: 15–22–4
- Road record: 9–29–5
- Goals for: 245
- Goals against: 344

Team information
- General manager: Mike Smith (Oct.–Jan.); John Paddock (Jan.–Apr.)
- Coach: John Paddock
- Captain: Dean Kennedy (Oct.–Nov.); Keith Tkachuk (Nov.–Apr.)
- Arena: Winnipeg Arena
- Average attendance: 13,130
- Minor league affiliate: Fort Wayne Komets

Team leaders
- Goals: Keith Tkachuk (41)
- Assists: Alexei Zhamnov (45)
- Points: Keith Tkachuk (81)
- Penalty minutes: Tie Domi (347)
- Plus/minus: Stu Barnes (–1)
- Wins: Bob Essensa (19)
- Goals against average: Bob Essensa (3.85)

The 1993–94 Winnipeg Jets season was the team's 22nd season of operation and their 15th in the National Hockey League (NHL). The Jets finished 12th in the Western Conference and failed to qualify for the playoffs for the first time since 1991.

== Off-season ==
With the NHL undergoing a realignment during the 1993 off-season, the Jets were moved from the Smythe Division into the newly created Central Division in the Western Conference. Joining the Jets in the Central Division were the Chicago Blackhawks, Dallas Stars, Detroit Red Wings, St. Louis Blues and Toronto Maple Leafs. The NHL also changed their playoff format, as the top eight teams in each conference would qualify for the post-season, instead of the top four teams in each division.

On June 11, 1993, the Jets acquired Stephane Beauregard from the Philadelphia Flyers in exchange for future considerations. Beauregard, who played with Winnipeg from 1989 to 1992, had a 3–9–0 record and a 4.41 goals against average in 16 games in the 1992–93 season with Philadelphia. On the same day, the Jets acquired Paul Ysebaert and Alan Kerr from the Detroit Red Wings in exchange for Aaron Ward and the Jets' fourth-round pick in the 1993 NHL entry draft. Ysebaert had 34 goals and 62 points in 80 games with the Red Wings in 1992–93, and in 1991–92, Ysebaert had an NHL best +44 rating with the Red Wings. Kerr had 3 goals and 11 points in 58 games with the Red Wings in 1992–93.

At the 1993 NHL Entry Draft, held on June 26, 1993, the Jets and Florida Panthers made a trade, as Winnipeg acquired the Panthers' second-round pick in the draft for the Jets' second- and third-round pick at the same draft. With their first-round pick, 15th overall, the Jets selected Mats Lindgren from Skellefteå AIK in Sweden. Lindgren had 20 goals and 38 points in 32 games for the club in the 1992–93 season. Another notable pick the club made was Michal Grosek in the sixth round.

On June 30, 1993, the Jets traded Kris Draper to the Detroit Red Wings in exchange for future considerations, which turned out to be $1.

During training camp, on September 24, 1993, the club traded Phil Housley to the St. Louis Blues in exchange for Nelson Emerson and Stephane Quintal. Emerson had 22 goals and 73 points in 82 games with the Blues during the 1992–93 season, while Quintal had 1 goal and 11 points in 75 games.

== Regular season ==
In November, Dean Kennedy was replaced as captain by forward Keith Tkachuk.

On January 19, general manager Mike Smith was fired and replaced by head coach John Paddock.

=== Final standings ===
Central Division
No.	CR		GP	W	L	T	GF	GA	Pts
1	1	**Detroit Red Wings**	84	46	30	8	356	275	100
2	2	**Toronto Maple Leafs**	84	43	29	12	280	243	98
3	4	**Dallas Stars**	84	42	29	13	286	265	97
4	5	**St. Louis Blues**	84	40	33	11	270	283	91
5	6	**Chicago Blackhawks**	84	39	36	9	254	240	87
6	12	Winnipeg Jets	84	24	51	9	245	344	57

Note: No. = Division rank, CR = Conference rank, W = Wins, L = Losses, T = Ties, GF = Goals For, GA = Goals Against, Pts = Points
Teams that qualified for the playoffs are highlighted in bold.

Western Conference
R		Div	GP	W	L	T	GF	GA	Pts
**1**	**y- Detroit Red Wings ***	**CEN**	**84**	**46**	**30**	**8**	**356**	**275**	**100**
**2**	**x- Calgary Flames ***	**PAC**	**84**	**42**	**29**	**13**	**302**	**256**	**97**
**3**	**Toronto Maple Leafs**	**CEN**	**84**	**43**	**29**	**12**	**280**	**243**	**98**
**4**	**Dallas Stars**	**CEN**	**84**	**42**	**29**	**13**	**286**	**265**	**97**
**5**	**St. Louis Blues**	**CEN**	**84**	**40**	**33**	**11**	**270**	**283**	**91**
**6**	**Chicago Blackhawks**	**CEN**	**84**	**39**	**36**	**9**	**254**	**240**	**87**
**7**	**Vancouver Canucks**	**PAC**	**84**	**41**	**40**	**3**	**279**	**276**	**85**
**8**	**San Jose Sharks**	**PAC**	**84**	**33**	**35**	**16**	**252**	**265**	**82**
9	Mighty Ducks of Anaheim	PAC	84	33	46	5	229	251	71
10	Los Angeles Kings	PAC	84	27	45	12	294	322	66
11	Edmonton Oilers	PAC	84	25	45	14	261	305	64
12	Winnipeg Jets	CEN	84	24	51	9	245	344	57

Divisions: CEN – Central, PAC – Pacific

bold – Qualified for playoffs; x – Won division; y – Won Conference (and division); * – Division leader

== Schedule and results ==
1993–94 regular season
October: 6–5–1 (home: 3–2–0; road: 3–3–1)

Game	Date	Score	Opponent	Record	Attendance	Recap
1	October 6, 1993	6–4	Washington Capitals (1993–94)	1–0–0	15,363	W
2	October 9, 1993	3–3 OT	@ Dallas Stars (1993–94)	1–0–1	15,511	T
3	October 10, 1993	3–4 OT	@ Chicago Blackhawks (1993–94)	1–1–1	17,335	L
4	October 12, 1993	4–7	@ New Jersey Devils (1993–94)	1–2–1	9,501	L
5	October 16, 1993	1–0 OT	Chicago Blackhawks (1993–94)	2–2–1	15,442	W
6	October 18, 1993	6–3	Edmonton Oilers (1993–94)	3–2–1	12,082	W
7	October 21, 1993	2–6	@ Detroit Red Wings (1993–94)	3–3–1	14,694	L
8	October 23, 1993	9–6	@ Philadelphia Flyers (1993–94)	4–3–1	17,160	W
9	October 26, 1993	5–2	@ Florida Panthers (1993–94)	5–3–1	13,171	W
10	October 27, 1993	4–3	@ Tampa Bay Lightning (1993–94)	6–3–1	16,006	W
11	October 29, 1993	3–4 OT	Los Angeles Kings (1993–94)	6–4–1	13,944	L
12	October 31, 1993	3–4	Calgary Flames (1993–94)	6–5–1	13,062	L

November: 4–8–2 (home: 1–5–0; road: 3–3–2)

Game	Date	Score	Opponent	Record	Attendance	Recap
13	November 3, 1993	0–3	St. Louis Blues (1993–94)	6–6–1	12,509	L
14	November 5, 1993	6–7 OT	Ottawa Senators (1993–94)	6–7–1	12,652	L
15	November 7, 1993	1–1 OT	@ Dallas Stars (1993–94)	6–7–2	13,396	T
16	November 9, 1993	5–2	@ New York Islanders (1993–94)	7–7–2	8,556	W
17	November 10, 1993	1–2	@ New York Rangers (1993–94)	7–8–2	18,200	L
18	November 13, 1993	2–3	Dallas Stars (1993–94)	7–9–2	13,394	L
19	November 15, 1993	2–7	@ Calgary Flames (1993–94)	7–10–2	18,152	L
20	November 17, 1993	2–1	Detroit Red Wings (1993–94)	8–10–2	14,394	W
21	November 19, 1993	0–6	@ Buffalo Sabres (1993–94)	8–11–2	14,745	L
22	November 20, 1993	5–5 OT	@ Quebec Nordiques (1993–94)	8–11–3	14,416	T
23	November 24, 1993	1–2	Mighty Ducks of Anaheim (1993–94)	8–12–3	12,147	L
24	November 26, 1993	3–5	Vancouver Canucks (1993–94)	8–13–3	14,434	L
25	November 28, 1993	4–3	@ St. Louis Blues (1993–94)	9–13–3	16,521	W
26	November 30, 1993	8–6	@ Los Angeles Kings (1993–94)	10–13–3	16,005	W

December: 5–7–2 (home: 4–2–1; road: 1–5–1)

Game	Date	Score	Opponent	Record	Attendance	Recap
27	December 1, 1993	2–5	@ Mighty Ducks of Anaheim (1993–94)	10–14–3	17,033	L
28	December 3, 1993	3–3 OT	@ San Jose Sharks (1993–94)	10–14–4	17,190	T
29	December 5, 1993	6–4	Detroit Red Wings (1993–94)	11–14–4	12,199	W
30	December 6, 1993	2–6	@ Detroit Red Wings (1993–94)	11–15–4	19,634	L
31	December 8, 1993	5–4	@ Toronto Maple Leafs (1993–94)	12–15–4	15,723	W
32	December 10, 1993	2–5	Florida Panthers (1993–94)	12–16–4	12,755	L
33	December 12, 1993	3–3 OT	Toronto Maple Leafs (1993–94)	12–16–5	14,300	T
34	December 17, 1993	1–6	@ Vancouver Canucks (1993–94)	12–17–5	15,631	L
35	December 18, 1993	4–5 OT	@ Calgary Flames (1993–94)	12–18–5	18,599	L
36	December 20, 1993	5–7	Mighty Ducks of Anaheim (1993–94)	12–19–5	14,033	L
37	December 23, 1993	5–2	Quebec Nordiques (1993–94)	13–19–5	12,802	W
38	December 27, 1993	0–6	@ Edmonton Oilers (1993–94)	13–20–5	14,836	L
39	December 29, 1993	3–2	Chicago Blackhawks (1993–94)	14–20–5	14,887	W
40	December 31, 1993	2–1	St. Louis Blues (1993–94)	15–20–5	15,567	W

January: 2–9–1 (home: 1–3–0; road: 1–6–1)

Game	Date	Score	Opponent	Record	Attendance	Recap
41	January 2, 1994	1–5	@ Chicago Blackhawks (1993–94)	15–21–5	17,532	L
42	January 5, 1994	0–4	@ Hartford Whalers (1993–94)	15–22–5	8,669	L
43	January 6, 1994	4–5	@ Boston Bruins (1993–94)	15–23–5	13,980	L
44	January 8, 1994	3–2	@ Ottawa Senators (1993–94)	16–23–5	10,378	W
45	January 10, 1994	2–4	@ Montreal Canadiens (1993–94)	16–24–5	16,220	L
46	January 12, 1994	3–2	Buffalo Sabres (1993–94)	17–24–5	13,336	W
47	January 15, 1994	1–5	Toronto Maple Leafs (1993–94)	17–25–5	15,344	L
48	January 16, 1994	2–3 OT	Tampa Bay Lightning (1993–94)	17–26–5	11,858	L
49	January 19, 1994	0–4	New Jersey Devils (1993–94)	17–27–5	12,716	L
50	January 25, 1994	4–4 OT	@ Los Angeles Kings (1993–94)	17–27–6	15,006	T
51	January 26, 1994	1–3	@ Mighty Ducks of Anaheim (1993–94)	17–28–6	17,174	L
52	January 29, 1994	1–7	@ Detroit Red Wings (1993–94)	17–29–6	19,875	L

February: 0–11–2 (home: 0–6–2; road: 0–5–0)

Game	Date	Score	Opponent	Record	Attendance	Recap
53	February 2, 1994	3–7	Dallas Stars (1993–94)	17–30–6	11,728	L
54	February 4, 1994	2–2 OT	Hartford Whalers (1993–94)	17–30–7	12,363	T
55	February 6, 1994	2–5	@ Edmonton Oilers (1993–94)	17–31–7	11,742	L
56	February 8, 1994	5–6	@ St. Louis Blues (1993–94)	17–32–7	16,871	L
57	February 9, 1994	2–4	@ Dallas Stars (1993–94)	17–33–7	16,914	L
58	February 11, 1994	1–3	Toronto Maple Leafs (1993–94)	17–34–7	14,337	L
59	February 15, 1994	3–5	@ Pittsburgh Penguins (1993–94)	17–35–7	15,765	L
60	February 18, 1994	2–7	Chicago Blackhawks (1993–94)	17–36–7	13,219	L
61	February 20, 1994	2–5	Calgary Flames (1993–94)	17–37–7	13,371	L
62	February 22, 1994	2–3	Florida Panthers (1993–94)	17–38–7	5,000	L
63	February 24, 1994	3–6	@ Chicago Blackhawks (1993–94)	17–39–7	17,326	L
64	February 25, 1994	6–7	Boston Bruins (1993–94)	17–40–7	14,096	L
65	February 28, 1994	3–3 OT	San Jose Sharks (1993–94)	17–40–8	10,908	T

March: 6–6–0 (home: 5–4–0; road: 1–2–0)

Game	Date	Score	Opponent	Record	Attendance	Recap
66	March 2, 1994	4–2	Dallas Stars (1993–94)	18–40–8	11,804	W
67	March 4, 1994	6–1	@ Ottawa Senators (1993–94)	19–40–8	6,388	W
68	March 6, 1994	3–5	Pittsburgh Penguins (1993–94)	19–41–8	13,009	L
69	March 7, 1994	2–7	New York Islanders (1993–94)	19–42–8	11,617	L
70	March 11, 1994	4–8	Vancouver Canucks (1993–94)	19–43–8	12,361	L
71	March 12, 1994	1–3	@ Toronto Maple Leafs (1993–94)	19–44–8	15,728	L
72	March 16, 1994	4–0	St. Louis Blues (1993–94)	20–44–8	11,689	W
73	March 19, 1994	4–2	Detroit Red Wings (1993–94)	21–44–8	13,871	W
74	March 23, 1994	3–1	Montreal Canadiens (1993–94)	22–44–8	15,401	W
75	March 25, 1994	3–8	San Jose Sharks (1993–94)	22–45–8	13,816	L
76	March 27, 1994	3–1	New York Rangers (1993–94)	23–45–8	12,793	W
77	March 29, 1994	4–9	@ San Jose Sharks (1993–94)	23–46–8	17,190	L

April: 1–5–1 (home: 1–1–1; road: 0–4–0)

Game	Date	Score	Opponent	Record	Attendance	Recap
78	April 1, 1994	1–5	@ Vancouver Canucks (1993–94)	23–47–8	15,716	L
79	April 4, 1994	2–2 OT	Philadelphia Flyers (1993–94)	23–47–9	13,046	T
80	April 6, 1994	3–4	Edmonton Oilers (1993–94)	23–48–9	10,961	L
81	April 9, 1994	4–3	Los Angeles Kings (1993–94)	24–48–9	15,567	W
82	April 10, 1994	0–7	@ Toronto Maple Leafs (1993–94)	24–49–9	15,728	L
83	April 12, 1994	3–4	@ Washington Capitals (1993–94)	24–50–9	13,713	L
84	April 14, 1994	1–3	@ St. Louis Blues (1993–94)	24–51–9	17,573	L

Legend: W Win (2 points) L Loss (0 points) T Tie (1 point)

== Player statistics ==
=== Regular season ===
Scoring

Player	Pos	GP	G	A	Pts	PIM	+/-	PPG	SHG	GWG
Keith Tkachuk	LW	84	41	40	81	255	-12	22	3	3
Nelson Emerson	RW	83	33	41	74	80	-38	4	5	6
Alexei Zhamnov	C	61	26	45	71	62	-20	7	0	1
Darrin Shannon	LW	77	21	37	58	87	-18	9	0	2
Teemu Selanne	RW	51	25	29	54	22	-23	11	0	2
Thomas Steen	C	76	19	32	51	32	-38	6	0	1
Boris Mironov	D	65	7	22	29	96	-29	5	0	0
Paul Ysebaert	C	60	9	18	27	18	-8	1	0	0
Stephane Quintal	D	81	8	18	26	119	-25	1	1	1
Teppo Numminen	D	57	5	18	23	28	-23	4	0	1
Tie Domi	RW	81	8	11	19	347	-8	0	0	1
Luciano Borsato	C	75	5	13	18	28	-11	1	1	2
Igor Ulanov	D	74	0	17	17	165	-11	0	0	0
Mike Eagles	C/LW	73	4	8	12	96	-20	0	1	0
Kris King	LW	83	4	8	12	205	-22	0	0	1
Russell Romaniuk	LW	24	4	8	12	6	-11	3	0	0
Wayne McBean	D	31	2	9	11	24	-21	2	0	0
Dean Kennedy	D	76	2	8	10	164	-22	0	0	1
Stu Barnes	C	18	5	4	9	8	-1	2	0	0
John LeBlanc	RW	17	6	2	8	2	-2	1	1	1
Dallas Drake	RW	15	3	5	8	12	-6	1	1	1
Fredrik Olausson	D	18	2	5	7	10	-3	1	0	0
Sergei Bautin	D	59	0	7	7	78	-13	0	0	0
Randy Gilhen	C	40	3	3	6	34	-13	0	0	0
Dave Manson	D	13	1	4	5	51	-10	1	0	0
Dave Tomlinson	C	31	1	3	4	24	-12	0	0	0
Darryl Shannon	D	20	0	4	4	18	-6	0	0	0
Arto Blomsten	D	18	0	2	2	6	-6	0	0	0
Michal Grosek	LW	3	1	0	1	0	-1	0	0	0
Oleg Mikulchik	D	4	0	1	1	17	-2	0	0	0
Stephane Beauregard	G	13	0	0	0	0	0	0	0	0
Andy Brickley	LW/C	2	0	0	0	0	-2	0	0	0
Tim Cheveldae	G	14	0	0	0	2	0	0	0	0
Bryan Erickson	RW	16	0	0	0	6	-7	0	0	0
Bob Essensa	G	56	0	0	0	6	0	0	0	0
Craig Fisher	C	4	0	0	0	2	-1	0	0	0
Yan Kaminsky	RW	1	0	0	0	0	1	0	0	0
Kevin McClelland	RW	6	0	0	0	19	0	0	0	0
Rob Murray	C	6	0	0	0	2	0	0	0	0
Mike O'Neill	G	17	0	0	0	0	0	0	0	0
Mark Visheau	D	1	0	0	0	0	0	0	0	0
Harijs Vitolinsh	C	8	0	0	0	4	0	0	0	0

Goaltending

Player	MIN	GP	W	L	T	GA	GAA	SO	SA	SV	SV%
Bob Essensa	3136	56	19	30	6	201	3.85	1	1714	1513	.883
Tim Cheveldae	788	14	5	8	1	52	3.96	1	485	433	.893
Stephane Beauregard	418	13	0	4	1	34	4.88	0	211	177	.839
Mike O'Neill	738	17	0	9	1	51	4.15	0	382	331	.866
Team:	5080	84	24	51	9	338	3.99	2	2792	2454	.879

Note:

Pos = Position;GP = Games played; G = Goals; A = Assists; Pts = Points; PIM = Penalty minutes; +/- = Plus/minus; PPG = Power-play goals; SHG = Short-handed goals; GWG = Game-winning goals
Pos = Position;GP = Games played; Min, TOI = Minutes played; W = Wins; L = Losses; T,T/OT = Ties; OTL = Overtime losses; GA = Goals-against; GAA = Goals-against average; SO = Shutouts; SA = Shots against; SV = Shots saved;SV% = Save percentage;

== Transactions ==
=== Trades ===
June 30, 1993	To Detroit Red Wings Kris Draper	To Winnipeg Jets Future Considerations
July 29, 1993	To St. Louis Blues Jim Hrivnak	To Winnipeg Jets 6th round pick in 1994 (Chris Kibermanis)
August 3, 1993	To Florida Panthers Jason Cirone	To Winnipeg Jets Dave Tomlinson
August 12, 1993	To Toronto Maple Leafs Cash	To Winnipeg Jets Kevin McClelland
August 25, 1993	To Toronto Maple Leafs Daniel Jardemyr	To Winnipeg Jets Future Considerations
September 24, 1993	To St. Louis Blues Phil Housley	To Winnipeg Jets Nelson Emerson; Stephane Quintal
September 30, 1993	To Florida Panthers Evgeny Davydov	To Winnipeg Jets 4th round pick in 1994 (Adam Copeland)
September 30, 1993	To New Jersey Devils 6th round pick in 1994 (Ryan Smart)	To Winnipeg Jets Brent Severyn
October 3, 1993	To Florida Panthers Brent Severyn	To Winnipeg Jets Milan Tichy
November 25, 1993	To Florida Panthers Stu Barnes; 6th round pick in 1994 (Chris Kibermanis)	To Winnipeg Jets Randy Gilhen
December 6, 1993	To Edmonton Oilers Fredrik Olausson; 7th round pick in 1994 (Curtis Sheptak)	To Winnipeg Jets 3rd round pick in 1994 (Travis Hansen)
December 9, 1993	To Edmonton Oilers Cash	To Winnipeg Jets Craig Fisher
February 1, 1994	To New York Islanders Yan Kaminsky	To Winnipeg Jets Wayne McBean
March 8, 1994	To Detroit Red Wings Bob Essensa; Sergei Bautin	To Winnipeg Jets Dallas Drake; Tim Cheveldae
March 15, 1994	To Edmonton Oilers Boris Mironov; Mats Lindgren; 1st round pick in 1994 (Jason Bonsignore); 4th round pick in 1994 (Adam Copeland)	To Winnipeg Jets Dave Manson; 6th round pick in 1994 (Chris Kibermanis)
March 21, 1994	To Chicago Blackhawks Paul Ysebaert	To Winnipeg Jets 3rd round pick in 1995 (Kevin McKay)
May 25, 1994	To Detroit Red Wings 3rd round pick in 1995 (Darryl Laplante)	To Winnipeg Jets Sheldon Kennedy
June 3, 1994	To Chicago Blackhawks 3rd round pick in 1995 (Kevin McKay)	To Winnipeg Jets Neil Wilkinson
June 29, 1994	To Vancouver Canucks Artur Oktyabrev	To Winnipeg Jets 6th round pick in 1994 (Steve Vezina)

=== Free agents ===
Player	Former team
Darryl Shannon	Toronto Maple Leafs
Oleg Mikulchik	Undrafted Free Agent

Player	New team
Dallas Eakins	Florida Panthers
John Druce	Los Angeles Kings
Mike Lalor	San Jose Sharks
Craig Fisher	Chicago Blackhawks

== Draft picks ==
Winnipeg's draft picks at the 1993 NHL entry draft held at the Quebec Coliseum in Quebec City, Quebec.

Round	#	Player	Nationality	College/Junior/Club team (League)
1	15	Mats Lindgren	Sweden	Skellefteå AIK (Sweden)
2	31	Scott Langkow	Canada	Portland Winter Hawks (WHL)
2	43	Alexei Budayev	Russia	Kristall Elektrostal (Russia)
4	79	Ruslan Batyrshin	Russia	Dynamo Moscow (Russia)
4	93	Ravil Gusmanov	Russia	Traktor Chelyabinsk (Russia)
5	119	Larry Courville	Canada	Newmarket Royals (OHL)
6	145	Michal Grosek	Czech Republic	AC ZPS Zlín (Czech Republic)
7	171	Martin Woods	Canada	Victoriaville Tigres (QMJHL)
8	197	Adrian Murray	Canada	Newmarket Royals (OHL)
9	217	Vladimir Potapov	Russia	Kristall Elektostal (Russia)
9	223	Ilya Stashenkkov	Russia	Krylya Sovetov (Russia)
9	228	Harijs Vitolinsh	Latvia	EHC Chur (Switzerland)
11	285	Russell Hewson	Canada	Swift Current Broncos (WHL)

== See also ==
- 1993–94 NHL season
