= 1993–94 Mighty Ducks of Anaheim season =

NHL team season

1993–94 Mighty Ducks of Anaheim
- Division: 4th Pacific
- Conference: 9th Western
- 1993–94 record: 33–46–5
- Home record: 14–26–2
- Road record: 19–20–3
- Goals for: 229
- Goals against: 251

Team information
- General manager: Jack Ferreira
- Coach: Ron Wilson
- Captain: Troy Loney
- Alternate captains: Todd Ewen; Stu Grimson; Randy Ladouceur
- Arena: Pond of Anaheim; Arrowhead Pond of Anaheim
- Average attendance: 16,989 (98.9%); Total: 696,560
- Minor league affiliates: San Diego Gulls (IHL); Greensboro Monarchs (ECHL)

Team leaders
- Goals: Bob Corkum (23)
- Assists: Terry Yake (31)
- Points: Terry Yake (52)
- Penalty minutes: Todd Ewen (272)
- Plus/minus: Bobby Dollas (+20)
- Wins: Guy Hebert (20)
- Goals against average: Mikhail Shtalenkov (2.65)

The 1993-94 Mighty Ducks of Anaheim were founded in 1993 by The Walt Disney Company. The team's original name was chosen from the Disney movie The Mighty Ducks, based on a group of misfit kids who turn their losing youth hockey team into a winning team. Disney subsequently made an animated series called Mighty Ducks, featuring a fictional Mighty Ducks of Anaheim team that consisted of anthropomorphized ducks led by the Mighty Duck Wild Wing. The team was the first tenant of Arrowhead Pond, a brand-new arena in Anaheim located a short distance east of Disneyland and across the Orange Freeway from Angel Stadium. The arena was completed the same year the team was founded.

The Mighty Ducks hired Jack Ferreira as their first general manager, and Pierre Gauthier became his assistant. Gauthier had been a former goalie for Boston University and had considerable scouting experience with the New England Whalers, Calgary Flames and New York Rangers.

While the Mighty Ducks did not qualify for the playoffs in their inaugural season, they were nevertheless reasonably competitive by the standards of the era for a first-year team. Notably, they still managed to finish ahead of their local rivals (and defending conference champions), the Los Angeles Kings.

== Offseason ==
Forward Troy Loney was named the franchise's first team captain.

== Regular season ==
On October 8, the Mighty Ducks took the ice against the Detroit Red Wings. It was the first regular season game for the Mighty Ducks in franchise history and the first regular season game played at the Arrowhead Pond of Anaheim. The Ducks finished their inaugural season with 71 points (33–46–5), and set a record, along with the Florida Panthers, for the most wins for an expansion team.

The Mighty Ducks finished last in power-play goals for (54), power-play percentage (14.36%) and most times shut out (9).

=== Season standings ===
Pacific Division
No.	CR		GP	W	L	T	GF	GA	Pts
1	3	**Calgary Flames**	84	42	29	13	302	256	97
2	7	**Vancouver Canucks**	84	41	40	3	279	276	85
3	8	**San Jose Sharks**	84	33	35	16	252	265	82
4	9	Mighty Ducks of Anaheim	84	33	46	5	229	251	71
5	10	Los Angeles Kings	84	27	45	12	294	322	66
6	11	Edmonton Oilers	84	25	45	14	261	305	64

Note: No. = Division rank, CR = Conference rank, W = Wins, L = Losses, T = Ties, GF = Goals For, GA = Goals Against, Pts = Points
Teams that qualified for the playoffs are highlighted in bold.

Western Conference
R		Div	GP	W	L	T	GF	GA	Pts
**1**	**y- Detroit Red Wings ***	**CEN**	**84**	**46**	**30**	**8**	**356**	**275**	**100**
**2**	**x- Calgary Flames ***	**PAC**	**84**	**42**	**29**	**13**	**302**	**256**	**97**
**3**	**Toronto Maple Leafs**	**CEN**	**84**	**43**	**29**	**12**	**280**	**243**	**98**
**4**	**Dallas Stars**	**CEN**	**84**	**42**	**29**	**13**	**286**	**265**	**97**
**5**	**St. Louis Blues**	**CEN**	**84**	**40**	**33**	**11**	**270**	**283**	**91**
**6**	**Chicago Blackhawks**	**CEN**	**84**	**39**	**36**	**9**	**254**	**240**	**87**
**7**	**Vancouver Canucks**	**PAC**	**84**	**41**	**40**	**3**	**279**	**276**	**85**
**8**	**San Jose Sharks**	**PAC**	**84**	**33**	**35**	**16**	**252**	**265**	**82**
9	Mighty Ducks of Anaheim	PAC	84	33	46	5	229	251	71
10	Los Angeles Kings	PAC	84	27	45	12	294	322	66
11	Edmonton Oilers	PAC	84	25	45	14	261	305	64
12	Winnipeg Jets	CEN	84	24	51	9	245	344	57

Divisions: CEN – Central, PAC – Pacific

bold – Qualified for playoffs; x – Won division; y – Won Conference (and division); * – Division leader

== Schedule and results ==
1993–94 regular season
October: 2–8–2 (home: 1–4–2; road: 1–4–0)

Game	Date	Visitor	Score	Home	OT	Decision	Record	Points	Recap
1	October 8	Detroit	7–2	Anaheim		Hebert	0–1–0	0	L
2	October 10	NY Islanders	4–3	Anaheim	OT	Tugnutt	0–2–0	0	L
3	October 13	Edmonton	3–4	Anaheim		Tugnutt	1–2–0	2	W
4	October 15	Boston	1–1	Anaheim	OT	Tugnutt	1–2–1	3	T
5	October 17	Calgary	2–2	Anaheim	OT	Hebert	1–2–2	4	T
6	October 19	Anaheim	4–2	NY Rangers		Hebert	2–2–2	6	W
7	October 20	Anaheim	0–4	New Jersey		Tugnutt	2–3–2	6	L
8	October 23	Anaheim	1–4	Montreal		Hebert	2–4–2	6	L
9	October 25	Anaheim	1–4	Ottawa		Tugnutt	2–5–2	6	L
10	October 28	Anaheim	3–4	San Jose		Hebert	2–6–2	6	L
11	October 29	Washington	5–2	Anaheim		Tugnutt	2–7–2	6	L
12	October 31	San Jose	2–1	Anaheim	OT	Hebert	2–8–2	6	L

November: 6–7–0 (home: 2–4–0; road: 4–3–0)

Game	Date	Visitor	Score	Home	OT	Decision	Record	Points	Recap
13	November 3	Dallas	4–5	Anaheim		Tugnutt	3–8–2	8	W
14	November 5	New Jersey	6–3	Anaheim		Tugnutt	3–9–2	8	L
15	November 7	Pittsburgh	5–4	Anaheim		Hebert	3–10–2	8	L
16	November 9	Dallas	2–4	Anaheim (played @ Phoenix)		Hebert	4–10–2	10	W
17	November 11	Anaheim	4–5	Calgary		Hebert	4–11–2	10	L
18	November 14	Anaheim	2–3	Vancouver		Shtalenkov	4–12–2	10	L
19	November 17	Toronto	4–3	Anaheim		Hebert	4–13–2	10	L
20	November 19	Anaheim	6–3	Vancouver		Tugnutt	5–13–2	12	W
21	November 21	Anaheim	4–2	Edmonton		Tugnutt	6–13–2	14	W
22	November 22	Anaheim	2–1	Calgary		Hebert	7–13–2	16	W
23	November 24	Anaheim	2–1	Winnipeg		Tugnutt	8–13–2	18	W
24	November 26	San Jose	4–3	Anaheim		Tugnutt	8–14–2	18	L
25	November 27	Anaheim	0–1	San Jose		Hebert	8–15–2	18	L

December: 6–8–0 (home: 2–4–0; road: 4–4–0)

Game	Date	Visitor	Score	Home	OT	Decision	Record	Points	Recap
26	December 1	Winnipeg	2–5	Anaheim		Tugnutt	9–15–2	20	W
27	December 2	Anaheim	2–3	Los Angeles		Hebert	9–16–2	20	L
28	December 5	Tampa Bay	4–2	Anaheim		Tugnutt	9–17–2	20	L
29	December 7	Florida	3–2	Anaheim		Hebert	9–18–2	20	L
30	December 12	St. Louis	1–2	Anaheim	OT	Hebert	10–18–2	22	W
31	December 14	Anaheim	2–5	Detroit		Tugnutt	10–19–2	22	L
32	December 15	Anaheim	1–0	Toronto		Hebert	11–19–2	24	W
33	December 17	Anaheim	3–2	Dallas		Hebert	12–19–2	26	W
34	December 19	Anaheim	0–2	Chicago		Tugnutt	12–20–2	26	L
35	December 20	Anaheim	7–5	Winnipeg		Hebert	13–20–2	28	W
36	December 22	Dallas	3–2	Anaheim	OT	Tugnutt	13–21–2	28	L
37	December 26	Los Angeles	3–2	Anaheim		Hebert	13–22–2	28	L
38	December 28	Anaheim	3–0	NY Islanders		Tugnutt	14–22–2	30	W
39	December 30	Anaheim	0–3	Washington		Tugnutt	14–23–2	30	L

January: 6–6–2 (home: 3–4–0; road: 3–2–2)

Game	Date	Visitor	Score	Home	OT	Decision	Record	Points	Recap
40	January 1	Anaheim	2–4	Florida		Hebert	14–24–2	30	L
41	January 2	Anaheim	4–1	Tampa Bay (played @ Orlando)		Tugnutt	15–24–2	32	W
42	January 6	Anaheim	6–2	Chicago		Tugnutt	16–24–2	34	W
43	January 8	Anaheim	5–3	St. Louis		Hebert	17–24–2	36	W
44	January 10	Detroit	6–4	Anaheim		Tugnutt	17–25–2	36	L
45	January 12	San Jose	5–2	Anaheim		Hebert	17–26–2	36	L
46	January 14	Hartford	3–6	Anaheim		Hebert	18–26–2	38	W
47	January 16	Vancouver	4–3	Anaheim		Tugnutt	18–27–2	38	L
48	January 18	Anaheim	3–3	Toronto	OT	Hebert	18–27–3	39	T
49	January 19	Anaheim	4–4	Detroit	OT	Hebert	18–27–4	40	T
50	January 24	St. Louis	3–2	Anaheim	OT	Hebert	18–28–4	40	L
51	January 26	Winnipeg	1–3	Anaheim		Hebert	19–28–4	42	W
52	January 28	NY Rangers	2–3	Anaheim		Hebert	20–28–4	44	W
53	January 29	Anaheim	1–5	Los Angeles		Hebert	20–29–4	44	L

February: 4–6–1 (home: 2–4–0; road: 2–2–1)

Game	Date	Visitor	Score	Home	OT	Decision	Record	Points	Recap
54	February 2	Calgary	4–2	Anaheim		Tugnutt	20–30–4	44	L
55	February 4	Vancouver	0–3	Anaheim		Hebert	21–30–4	46	W
56	February 6	Chicago	3–2	Anaheim		Hebert	21–31–4	46	L
57	February 11	Los Angeles	5–3	Anaheim		Hebert	21–32–4	46	L
58	February 13	Anaheim	6–3	Edmonton		Tugnutt	22–32–4	48	W
59	February 16	Philadelphia	3–6	Anaheim		Hebert	23–32–4	50	W
60	February 18	Quebec	1–0	Anaheim		Tugnutt	23–33–4	50	L
61	February 20	Anaheim	1–4	St. Louis		Hebert	23–34–4	50	L
62	February 23	Anaheim	2–4	Buffalo		Hebert	23–35–4	50	L
63	February 24	Anaheim	2–2	Pittsburgh	OT	Shtalenkov	23–35–5	51	T
64	February 26	Anaheim	6–3	Quebec		Hebert	24–35–5	53	W

March: 6–8–0 (home: 3–4–0; road: 3–4–0)

Game	Date	Visitor	Score	Home	OT	Decision	Record	Points	Recap
65	March 2	Montreal	5–2	Anaheim		Hebert	24–36–5	53	L
66	March 4	Edmonton	1–4	Anaheim		Hebert	25–36–5	55	W
67	March 6	Anaheim	0–6	San Jose		Hebert	25–37–5	55	L
68	March 8	Anaheim	0–3	Chicago (played @ Phoenix)		Shtalenkov	25–38–5	55	L
69	March 9	Buffalo	3–0	Anaheim		Hebert	25–39–5	55	L
70	March 11	Chicago	3–2	Anaheim		Hebert	25–40–5	55	L
71	March 13	Ottawa	1–5	Anaheim		Shtalenkov	26–40–5	57	W
72	March 16	Los Angeles	2–5	Anaheim		Shtalenkov	27–40–5	59	W
73	March 22	Anaheim	3–4	Dallas		Shtalenkov	27–41–5	59	L
74	March 24	Anaheim	3–5	Boston		Hebert	27–42–5	59	L
75	March 26	Anaheim	3–2	Hartford		Hebert	28–42–5	61	W
76	March 27	Anaheim	3–2	Philadelphia	OT	Hebert	29–42–5	63	W
77	March 30	Anaheim	5–2	Los Angeles		Hebert	30–42–5	65	W
78	March 31	Edmonton	3–2	Anaheim	OT	Hebert	30–43–5	65	L

April: 3–3–0 (home: 1–2–0; road: 2–1–0)

Game	Date	Visitor	Score	Home	OT	Decision	Record	Points	Recap
79	April 2	Toronto	1–3	Anaheim		Hebert	31–43–5	67	W
80	April 6	Anaheim	2–4	Calgary		Hebert	31–44–5	67	L
81	April 8	Anaheim	3–1	Edmonton		Hebert	32–44–5	69	W
82	April 9	Anaheim	3–1	Vancouver		Shtalenkov	33–44–5	71	W
83	April 11	Calgary	3–0	Anaheim		Shtalenkov	33–45–5	71	L
84	April 13	Vancouver	2–1	Anaheim		Hebert	33–46–5	71	L

Legend: W Win (2 points) L Loss (0 points) T Tie (1 point)

== Player statistics ==
=== Skaters ===
Regular season
Player	GP	G	A	Pts	+/−	PIM
Terry Yake	82	21	31	52	2	44
Bob Corkum	76	23	28	51	4	18
Garry Valk	78	18	27	45	8	100
Tim Sweeney	78	16	27	43	3	49
Bill Houlder	80	14	25	39	-18	40
Joe Sacco	84	19	18	37	-11	61
Peter Douris	74	12	22	34	-5	21
Shaun Van Allen	80	8	25	33	0	64
Anatoli Semenov	49	11	19	30	-4	12
Sean Hill	68	7	20	27	-12	78
Patrik Carnback	73	12	11	23	-8	54
Alexei Kasatonov ‡	55	4	18	22	-8	43
Bobby Dollas	77	9	11	20	20	55
David Williams	56	5	15	20	8	42
Troy Loney	62	13	6	19	-5	88
Todd Ewen	76	9	9	18	-7	272
Don McSween	32	3	9	12	4	39
Steven King	36	8	3	11	-7	44
Stephan Lebeau †	22	6	4	10	-5	14
Randy Ladouceur	81	1	9	10	7	74
Jarrod Skalde	20	5	4	9	-3	10
Mark Ferner	50	3	5	8	-16	30
John Lilley	13	1	6	7	1	8
Stu Grimson	77	1	5	6	-6	199
Robin Bawa	12	0	1	1	-3	7
Myles O'Connor	5	0	1	1	0	6
Maxim Bets	3	0	0	0	-3	0
Anatoli Fedotov	3	0	0	0	-1	0
Lonnie Loach	3	0	0	0	-2	2
Scott McKay	1	0	0	0	0	0
Jim Thomson	6	0	0	0	0	5
Total		229	359	588	—	1,479

=== Goaltenders ===
Regular season
Player	GP	GS	TOI	W	L	T	GA	GAA	SA	SV%	SO	G	A	PIM
Guy Hebert	52	49	2,990:33	20	27	3	141	2.83	1,513	.907	2	0	0	2
Ron Tugnutt ‡	28	26	1,519:41	10	15	1	76	3.00	828	.908	1	0	0	2
Mikhail Shtalenkov	10	9	542:30	3	4	1	24	2.65	265	.909	0	0	0	0
Total			5,052:44	33	46	5	241	2.86	2,606	.908	3	0	0	4

† Denotes player spent time with another team before joining the Mighty Ducks. Stats reflect time with the Mighty Ducks only.
‡ Denotes player was traded mid-season. Stats reflect time with the Mighty Ducks only.

== Transactions ==
=== Trades ===
Date	Details	
August 10, 1993	To Montreal Canadiens 1994 3rd-round pick (#54 overall)	To Mighty Ducks of Anaheim Todd Ewen; Patrik Carnback
February 20, 1994	To Montreal Canadiens Ron Tugnutt	To Mighty Ducks of Anaheim Stephane Lebeau
February 20, 1994	To Quebec Nordiques 1995 4th-round pick (#81 overall)	To Mighty Ducks of Anaheim John Tanner
March 21, 1994	To St. Louis Blues Alexei Kasatonov	To Mighty Ducks of Anaheim Maxim Bets; 1995 6th-round pick (#153 overall)

=== Free agents ===
Date	Player	Team	Contract Term
July 22, 1993	Myles O'Connor		
July 22, 1993	Peter Douris	from Boston Bruins	
July 22, 1993	Shaun Van Allen	from Edmonton Oilers	
August 2, 1993	Scott McKay		
August 16, 1993	Denny Lambert		
September 7, 1993	Jean-Francois Jomphe		
September 7, 1993	Allan Bester	from Detroit Red Wings	
September 19, 1993	Joel Savage		
January 12, 1994	Don McSween		
January 28, 1994	Mike Maneluk	from Hartford Whalers	multi-year contract (effective at start of 1994-95 season)
March 9, 1994	John Lilley		

=== Waivers ===
Date	Player	Team
October 3, 1993	Garry Valk	from Vancouver Canucks

== Draft picks ==
=== Expansion draft ===
#	Player	Position	Drafted from
2	Guy Hebert	G	St. Louis Blues
3	Glenn Healy ^{1}	G	New York Islanders
6	Ron Tugnutt	G	Edmonton Oilers
8	Alexei Kasatonov	D	New Jersey Devils
9	Sean Hill	D	Montreal Canadiens
11	Bill Houlder	D	Buffalo Sabres
14	Bobby Dollas	D	Detroit Red Wings
16	Randy Ladouceur	D	Hartford Whalers
17	David Williams	D	San Jose Sharks
19	Dennis Vial ^{2}	D	Tampa Bay Lightning
22	Mark Ferner	D	Ottawa Senators
23	Steven King	RW	New York Rangers
26	Troy Loney	LW	Pittsburgh Penguins
28	Stu Grimson	LW	Chicago Blackhawks
29	Tim Sweeney	LW	Boston Bruins
31	Terry Yake	C	Hartford Whalers
34	Jarrod Skalde	C	New Jersey Devils
36	Bob Corkum	C	Buffalo Sabres
37	Anatoli Semenov	C	Vancouver Canucks
39	Joe Sacco	RW	Toronto Maple Leafs
42	Lonnie Loach	LW	Los Angeles Kings
44	Jim Thomson	RW	Los Angeles Kings
45	Trevor Halverson	LW	Washington Capitals
47	Robin Bawa	RW	San Jose Sharks

Notes

1. Lost in expansion draft phase two to the Tampa Bay Lightning and then traded to the New York Rangers for a third-round pick in the 1993 NHL entry draft.
2. Lost in expansion draft phase two to the Ottawa Senators.

=== NHL draft ===
Anaheim's draft picks at the 1993 NHL entry draft held at Colisée de Québec in Quebec City, Quebec, Canada.

Round	Pick	Player	Position	Nationality	College/Junior/Club team
1	4	Paul Kariya	LW	Canada	University of Maine (Hockey East)
2	30	Nikolai Tsulygin	D	Russia	Salavat Yulayev Ufa (Russia)
3	56	Valeri Karpov	RW	Russia	Traktor Chelyabinsk (Russia)
4	82	Joel Gagnon	G	Canada	Oshawa Generals (OHL)
5	108	Mikhail Shtalenkov	G	Russia	Milwaukee Admirals (IHL)
6	134	Antti Aalto	C	Finland	TPS Turku (Finland)
7	160	Matt Peterson	D	United States	Osseo Orioles (High-MN)
8	186	Tom Askey	G	United States	Ohio State University (CCHA)
9	212	Vitaly Kozel	C	Belarus	Minsk (Russia)
10	238	Anatoli Fedotov	D	Russia	Krylia Sovetov (Russia)
11	264	David Penney	LW	United States	Worcester Academy (High-MA)
S	5	Pat Thompson	D	Canada	Brown University (ECAC)

== See also ==
- 1993–94 NHL season
