= 1993–94 St. Louis Blues season =

National Hockey League team season

1993–94 St. Louis Blues
- Division: 4th Central
- Conference: 5th Western
- 1993–94 record: 40–33–11
- Home record: 22–11–8
- Road record: 18–22–3
- Goals for: 270
- Goals against: 283

Team information
- General manager: Ron Caron
- Coach: Bob Berry
- Captain: Brett Hull
- Alternate captains: Ron Sutter (Oct-Jan); Garth Butcher (Oct-Jan); Brendan Shanahan
- Arena: St. Louis Arena
- Minor league affiliate: Peoria Rivermen (IHL)

Team leaders
- Goals: Brett Hull (57)
- Assists: Craig Janney (68)
- Points: Brendan Shanahan (102)
- Penalty minutes: Kelly Chase (278)
- Plus/minus: Kevin Miller (+6)
- Wins: Curtis Joseph (36)
- Goals against average: Curtis Joseph (3.10)

The 1993–94 St. Louis Blues season was the 27th for the franchise in St. Louis, Missouri, and the final season for the Blues at the St. Louis Arena. The Blues finished the regular-season with a record of 40 wins, 33 losses and 11 ties, good for 91 points, and a trip to the Stanley Cup playoffs, where they were swept by the Dallas Stars in the Western Conference Quarterfinals. For the second consecutive year, the Blues had two 50-goal scorers (Brett Hull and Brendan Shanahan).

== Regular season ==
=== Final standings ===
Central Division
No.	CR		GP	W	L	T	GF	GA	Pts
1	1	**Detroit Red Wings**	84	46	30	8	356	275	100
2	2	**Toronto Maple Leafs**	84	43	29	12	280	243	98
3	4	**Dallas Stars**	84	42	29	13	286	265	97
4	5	**St. Louis Blues**	84	40	33	11	270	283	91
5	6	**Chicago Blackhawks**	84	39	36	9	254	240	87
6	12	Winnipeg Jets	84	24	51	9	245	344	57

Note: No. = Division rank, CR = Conference rank, W = Wins, L = Losses, T = Ties, GF = Goals For, GA = Goals Against, Pts = Points
Teams that qualified for the playoffs are highlighted in bold.

Western Conference
R		Div	GP	W	L	T	GF	GA	Pts
**1**	**y- Detroit Red Wings ***	**CEN**	**84**	**46**	**30**	**8**	**356**	**275**	**100**
**2**	**x- Calgary Flames ***	**PAC**	**84**	**42**	**29**	**13**	**302**	**256**	**97**
**3**	**Toronto Maple Leafs**	**CEN**	**84**	**43**	**29**	**12**	**280**	**243**	**98**
**4**	**Dallas Stars**	**CEN**	**84**	**42**	**29**	**13**	**286**	**265**	**97**
**5**	**St. Louis Blues**	**CEN**	**84**	**40**	**33**	**11**	**270**	**283**	**91**
**6**	**Chicago Blackhawks**	**CEN**	**84**	**39**	**36**	**9**	**254**	**240**	**87**
**7**	**Vancouver Canucks**	**PAC**	**84**	**41**	**40**	**3**	**279**	**276**	**85**
**8**	**San Jose Sharks**	**PAC**	**84**	**33**	**35**	**16**	**252**	**265**	**82**
9	Mighty Ducks of Anaheim	PAC	84	33	46	5	229	251	71
10	Los Angeles Kings	PAC	84	27	45	12	294	322	66
11	Edmonton Oilers	PAC	84	25	45	14	261	305	64
12	Winnipeg Jets	CEN	84	24	51	9	245	344	57

Divisions: CEN – Central, PAC – Pacific

bold – Qualified for playoffs; x – Won division; y – Won Conference (and division); * – Division leader

== Playoffs ==
The Blues got swept by the Dallas Stars in four games.

== Schedule and results ==
=== Regular season ===
1993–94 regular season
October: 7–2–1 (home: 4–0–0; road: 3–2–1)

Game	Date	Score	Opponent	Record	Recap
1	October 7, 1993	5–3	Florida Panthers (1993–94)	1–0–0	W
2	October 9, 1993	7–5	Ottawa Senators (1993–94)	2–0–0	W
3	October 13, 1993	5–2	@ Detroit Red Wings (1993–94)	3–0–0	W
4	October 16, 1993	0–4	@ Dallas Stars (1993–94)	3–1–0	L
5	October 19, 1993	4–1	@ San Jose Sharks (1993–94)	4–1–0	W
6	October 21, 1993	5–2	San Jose Sharks (1993–94)	5–1–0	W
7	October 23, 1993	3–3 OT	@ Pittsburgh Penguins (1993–94)	5–1–1	T
8	October 26, 1993	2–9	@ Chicago Blackhawks (1993–94)	5–2–1	L
9	October 28, 1993	2–1	Hartford Whalers (1993–94)	6–2–1	W
10	October 30, 1993	2–1	@ Boston Bruins (1993–94)	7–2–1	W

November: 5–4–4 (home: 3–1–4; road: 2–3–0)

Game	Date	Score	Opponent	Record	Recap
11	November 1, 1993	4–2	@ Hartford Whalers (1993–94)	8–2–1	W
12	November 3, 1993	3–0	@ Winnipeg Jets (1993–94)	9–2–1	W
13	November 6, 1993	6–5 OT	Edmonton Oilers (1993–94)	10–2–1	W
14	November 9, 1993	3–3 OT	Pittsburgh Penguins (1993–94)	10–2–2	T
15	November 11, 1993	3–2	Toronto Maple Leafs (1993–94)	11–2–2	W
16	November 13, 1993	3–6	@ Los Angeles Kings (1993–94)	11–3–2	L
17	November 16, 1993	0–3	@ Vancouver Canucks (1993–94)	11–4–2	L
18	November 18, 1993	3–3 OT	Calgary Flames (1993–94)	11–4–3	T
19	November 20, 1993	4–1	Los Angeles Kings (1993–94)	12–4–3	W
20	November 21, 1993	2–2 OT	Detroit Red Wings (1993–94)	12–4–4	T
21	November 24, 1993	2–5	@ Washington Capitals (1993–94)	12–5–4	L
22	November 26, 1993	6–6 OT	New Jersey Devils (1993–94)	12–5–5	T
23	November 28, 1993	3–4	Winnipeg Jets (1993–94)	12–6–5	L

December: 7–8–0 (home: 4–3–0; road: 3–5–0)

Game	Date	Score	Opponent	Record	Recap
24	December 1, 1993	2–4	@ Toronto Maple Leafs (1993–94)	12–7–5	L
25	December 2, 1993	4–5	Toronto Maple Leafs (1993–94)	12–8–5	L
26	December 4, 1993	4–3	Dallas Stars (1993–94)	13–8–5	W
27	December 7, 1993	3–2	Chicago Blackhawks (1993–94)	14–8–5	W
28	December 9, 1993	2–3	@ Detroit Red Wings (1993–94)	14–9–5	L
29	December 11, 1993	1–9	@ Los Angeles Kings (1993–94)	14–10–5	L
30	December 12, 1993	1–2 OT	@ Mighty Ducks of Anaheim (1993–94)	14–11–5	L
31	December 15, 1993	3–1	@ San Jose Sharks (1993–94)	15–11–5	W
32	December 17, 1993	4–3	@ Calgary Flames (1993–94)	16–11–5	W
33	December 19, 1993	4–1	@ Edmonton Oilers (1993–94)	17–11–5	W
34	December 23, 1993	7–4	Tampa Bay Lightning (1993–94)	18–11–5	W
35	December 26, 1993	3–2	Chicago Blackhawks (1993–94)	19–11–5	W
36	December 27, 1993	2–5	Montreal Canadiens (1993–94)	19–12–5	L
37	December 29, 1993	3–4	New York Rangers (1993–94)	19–13–5	L
38	December 31, 1993	1–2	@ Winnipeg Jets (1993–94)	19–14–5	L

January: 7–4–2 (home: 3–1–1; road: 4–3–1)

Game	Date	Score	Opponent	Record	Recap
39	January 2, 1994	4–3 OT	Calgary Flames (1993–94)	20–14–5	W
40	January 4, 1994	4–4 OT	Detroit Red Wings (1993–94)	20–14–6	T
41	January 6, 1994	2–1	@ Hartford Whalers (1993–94)	21–14–6	W
42	January 8, 1994	3–5	Mighty Ducks of Anaheim (1993–94)	21–15–6	L
43	January 9, 1994	1–2	@ Dallas Stars (1993–94)	21–16–6	L
44	January 13, 1994	6–4	Edmonton Oilers (1993–94)	22–16–6	W
45	January 15, 1994	2–1	Buffalo Sabres (1993–94)	23–16–6	W
46	January 18, 1994	1–4	@ New York Rangers (1993–94)	23–17–6	L
47	January 19, 1994	3–8	@ Philadelphia Flyers (1993–94)	23–18–6	L
48	January 24, 1994	3–2 OT	@ Mighty Ducks of Anaheim (1993–94)	24–18–6	W
49	January 25, 1994	3–3 OT	@ Vancouver Canucks (1993–94)	24–18–7	T
50	January 28, 1994	3–2	@ Edmonton Oilers (1993–94)	25–18–7	W
51	January 29, 1994	5–3	@ Calgary Flames (1993–94)	26–18–7	W

February: 6–5–1 (home: 5–3–1; road: 1–2–0)

Game	Date	Score	Opponent	Record	Recap
52	February 1, 1994	4–4 OT	Toronto Maple Leafs (1993–94)	26–18–8	T
53	February 3, 1994	3–4	Quebec Nordiques (1993–94)	26–19–8	L
54	February 5, 1994	4–3	San Jose Sharks (1993–94)	27–19–8	W
55	February 8, 1994	6–5	Winnipeg Jets (1993–94)	28–19–8	W
56	February 10, 1994	3–4	Washington Capitals (1993–94)	28–20–8	L
57	February 12, 1994	4–5 OT	Detroit Red Wings (1993–94)	28–21–8	L
58	February 15, 1994	3–2	Vancouver Canucks (1993–94)	29–21–8	W
59	February 18, 1994	3–1	Boston Bruins (1993–94)	30–21–8	W
60	February 20, 1994	4–1	Mighty Ducks of Anaheim (1993–94)	31–21–8	W
61	February 24, 1994	0–6	@ Quebec Nordiques (1993–94)	31–22–8	L
62	February 26, 1994	11–1	@ Ottawa Senators (1993–94)	32–22–8	W
63	February 28, 1994	1–5	@ New Jersey Devils (1993–94)	32–23–8	L

March: 5–7–1 (home: 1–3–1; road: 4–4–0)

Game	Date	Score	Opponent	Record	Recap
64	March 1, 1994	2–4	@ New York Islanders (1993–94)	32–24–8	L
65	March 3, 1994	0–4	Vancouver Canucks (1993–94)	32–25–8	L
66	March 7, 1994	3–2	@ Toronto Maple Leafs (1993–94)	33–25–8	W
67	March 9, 1994	2–7	@ Montreal Canadiens (1993–94)	33–26–8	L
68	March 12, 1994	5–5 OT	New York Islanders (1993–94)	33–26–9	T
69	March 16, 1994	0–4	@ Winnipeg Jets (1993–94)	33–27–9	L
70	March 18, 1994	2–4	@ Toronto Maple Leafs (1993–94)	33–28–9	L
71	March 20, 1994	4–3 OT	@ Chicago Blackhawks (1993–94)	34–28–9	W
72	March 22, 1994	3–6	Philadelphia Flyers (1993–94)	34–29–9	L
73	March 23, 1994	3–2	@ Buffalo Sabres (1993–94)	35–29–9	W
74	March 25, 1994	5–3	Dallas Stars (1993–94)	36–29–9	W
75	March 27, 1994	3–4	San Jose Sharks (1993–94)	36–30–9	L
76	March 30, 1994	3–1	@ Florida Panthers (1993–94)	37–30–9	W

April: 3–3–2 (home: 3–0–1; road: 0–3–1)

Game	Date	Score	Opponent	Record	Recap
77	April 1, 1994	3–4	@ Tampa Bay Lightning (1993–94)	37–31–9	L
78	April 3, 1994	3–3 OT	@ Detroit Red Wings (1993–94)	37–31–10	T
79	April 5, 1994	5–1	Chicago Blackhawks (1993–94)	38–31–10	W
80	April 7, 1994	6–2	Los Angeles Kings (1993–94)	39–31–10	W
81	April 8, 1994	1–6	@ Chicago Blackhawks (1993–94)	39–32–10	L
82	April 10, 1994	2–2 OT	Dallas Stars (1993–94)	39–32–11	T
83	April 12, 1994	5–9	@ Dallas Stars (1993–94)	39–33–11	L
84	April 14, 1994	3–1	Winnipeg Jets (1993–94)	40–33–11	W

Legend: W Win (2 points) L Loss (0 points) T Tie (1 point)

=== Playoffs ===
1994 Stanley Cup playoffs
Western Conference Quarterfinals vs. (4) Dallas Stars – Stars win 4–0

Game	Date	Score	Opponent	Series	Recap
1	April 17, 1994	3–5	@ Dallas Stars	Stars lead 1–0	L
2	April 20, 1994	2–4	@ Dallas Stars	Stars lead 2–0	L
3	April 22, 1994	4–5 OT	Dallas Stars	Stars lead 3–0	L
4	April 24, 1994	1–2	Dallas Stars	Stars win 4–0	L

Legend: W Win L Loss

== Player statistics ==
=== Regular season ===
Scoring

Player	Pos	GP	G	A	Pts	PIM	+/-	PPG	SHG	GWG
Brendan Shanahan	LW	81	52	50	102	211	-9	15	7	8
Brett Hull	RW	81	57	40	97	38	-3	25	3	6
Craig Janney	C	69	16	68	84	24	-14	8	0	7
Jeff Brown	D	63	13	47	60	46	-13	7	0	3
Kevin Miller	C	75	23	25	48	83	6	6	3	5
Steve Duchesne	D	36	12	19	31	14	1	8	0	1
Vitali Prokhorov	LW	55	15	10	25	20	-6	3	0	1
Philippe Bozon	LW	80	9	16	25	42	4	0	1	1
Phil Housley	D	26	7	15	22	12	-5	4	0	1
Vitali Karamnov	LW	59	9	12	21	51	-3	2	0	1
Jim Montgomery	C	67	6	14	20	44	-1	0	0	1
Petr Nedved	C	19	6	14	20	8	2	2	0	0
Ron Sutter	C	36	6	12	18	46	-1	1	0	2
Igor Korolev	C	73	6	10	16	40	-12	0	0	1
Peter Stastny	C	17	5	11	16	4	-2	2	0	1
Murray Baron	D	77	5	9	14	123	-14	0	0	0
Tony Hrkac	C	36	6	5	11	8	-11	1	1	1
Bret Hedican	D	61	0	11	11	64	-8	0	0	0
Rick Zombo	D	74	2	8	10	85	-15	0	0	0
Bob Bassen	C	46	2	7	9	44	-14	0	1	0
Doug Crossman	D	50	2	7	9	10	1	1	0	0
Tom Tilley	D	48	1	7	8	32	3	0	0	0
Kelly Chase	RW	68	2	5	7	278	-5	0	0	0
Garth Butcher	D	43	1	6	7	76	-6	0	1	0
Nathan LaFayette	C	38	2	3	5	14	-9	0	0	0
David Mackey	LW	30	2	3	5	56	-4	0	0	0
Daniel Laperriere	D	20	1	3	4	8	-1	1	0	0
Basil McRae	LW	40	1	2	3	103	-7	0	0	0
Curtis Joseph	G	71	0	3	3	4	0	0	0	0
Alexei Kasatonov	D	8	0	2	2	19	5	0	0	0
Denny Felsner	LW	6	1	0	1	2	-1	0	0	0
Denis Chasse	RW	3	0	1	1	15	1	0	0	0
Jim Hrivnak	G	23	0	1	1	2	0	0	0	0
Kevin Miehm	C	14	0	1	1	4	-3	0	0	0
Jeff Batters	D	6	0	0	0	7	1	0	0	0
Terry Hollinger	D	2	0	0	0	0	1	0	0	0
Ian Laperriere	RW	1	0	0	0	0	0	0	0	0
David Roberts	LW	1	0	0	0	2	0	0	0	0

Goaltending

Player	MIN	GP	W	L	T	GA	GAA	SO	SA	SV	SV%
Curtis Joseph	4127	71	36	23	11	213	3.10	1	2382	2169	.911
Jim Hrivnak	970	23	4	10	0	69	4.27	0	563	494	.877
Team:	5097	84	40	33	11	282	3.32	1	2945	2663	.904

=== Playoffs ===
Scoring

Player	Pos	GP	G	A	Pts	PIM	+/-	PPG	SHG	GWG
Brendan Shanahan	LW	4	2	5	7	4	6	0	0	0
Craig Janney	C	4	1	3	4	0	3	0	0	0
Phil Housley	D	4	2	1	3	4	-3	2	0	0
Brett Hull	RW	4	2	1	3	0	1	1	0	0
Alexei Kasatonov	D	4	2	0	2	2	-2	0	0	0
Steve Duchesne	D	4	0	2	2	2	-1	0	0	0
Kevin Miller	C	3	1	0	1	4	0	0	1	0
Kelly Chase	RW	4	0	1	1	6	0	0	0	0
Petr Nedved	C	4	0	1	1	4	-2	0	0	0
Tom Tilley	D	4	0	1	1	2	0	0	0	0
Murray Baron	D	4	0	0	0	10	-1	0	0	0
Philippe Bozon	LW	4	0	0	0	4	-2	0	0	0
Tony Hrkac	C	4	0	0	0	0	-3	0	0	0
Curtis Joseph	G	4	0	0	0	0	0	0	0	0
Igor Korolev	C	2	0	0	0	0	-2	0	0	0
David Mackey	LW	2	0	0	0	2	-1	0	0	0
Basil McRae	LW	2	0	0	0	12	0	0	0	0
Vitali Prokhorov	LW	4	0	0	0	0	-5	0	0	0
David Roberts	LW	3	0	0	0	12	-1	0	0	0
Peter Stastny	C	4	0	0	0	2	-4	0	0	0
Rick Zombo	D	4	0	0	0	11	1	0	0	0

Goaltending

Player	MIN	GP	W	L	GA	GAA	SO	SA	SV	SV%
Curtis Joseph	246	4	0	4	15	3.66	0	158	143	.905
Team:	246	4	0	4	15	3.66	0	158	143	.905

Note:

Pos = Position;GP = Games played; G = Goals; A = Assists; Pts = Points; PIM = Penalty minutes; +/- = Plus/minus; PPG = Power-play goals; SHG = Short-handed goals; GWG = Game-winning goals
Pos = Position;GP = Games played; Min, TOI = Minutes played; W = Wins; L = Losses; T,T/OT = Ties; OTL = Overtime losses; GA = Goals-against; GAA = Goals-against average; SO = Shutouts; SA = Shots against; SV = Shots saved;SV% = Save percentage;

== Draft picks ==
St. Louis's draft picks at the 1993 NHL entry draft held at the Quebec Coliseum in Quebec City, Quebec.

Round	#	Player	Nationality	College/Junior/Club team (League)
2	37	Maxim Bets	Russia	Spokane Chiefs (WHL)
3	63	Jamie Rivers	Canada	Sudbury Wolves (OHL)
4	89	Jamal Mayers	Canada	Western Michigan University (CCHA)
6	141	Todd Kelman	Canada	Vernon Lakers (BCJHL)
7	167	Mike Buzak	Canada	Michigan State University (CCHA)
8	193	Eric Boguniecki	United States	Westminster School (USHS-CT)
9	219	Mike Grier	United States	Saint Sebastian's School (USHS-MA)
10	245	Libor Prochazka	Czech Republic	Poldi SONP Kladno (Czech Republic)
11	271	Alexander Vasilevski	Russia	Victoria Cougars (WHL)
11	275	Christer Olsson	Sweden	Brynäs IF (Sweden)

== See also ==
- 1993–94 NHL season
