= 1993–94 New York Islanders season =

Ice hockey team season

1993–94 New York Islanders
- Division: 4th Atlantic
- Conference: 8th Eastern
- 1993–94 record: 36–36–12
- Home record: 23–15–4
- Road record: 13–21–8
- Goals for: 282
- Goals against: 264

Team information
- General manager: Don Maloney
- Coach: Al Arbour
- Captain: Patrick Flatley
- Arena: Nassau Coliseum
- Average attendance: 12,091
- Minor league affiliates: Salt Lake Golden Eagles; Richmond Renegades

Team leaders
- Goals: Steve Thomas (42)
- Assists: Pierre Turgeon (56)
- Points: Pierre Turgeon (94)
- Penalty minutes: Mick Vukota (237)
- Plus/minus: Marty McInnis (+31)
- Wins: Ron Hextall (27)
- Goals against average: Jamie McLennan (2.84)

The 1993–94 New York Islanders season was the 22nd season in the franchise's history and the final one with Al Arbour as head coach. For the second consecutive year, four Islanders reached the 30-goal plateau. In the playoffs, the Islanders were swept in four straight by their rival New York Rangers en route to winning the Stanley Cup.

== Regular season ==
=== Final standings ===
Atlantic Division
No.	CR		GP	W	L	T	GF	GA	Pts
1	1	**New York Rangers**	84	52	24	8	299	231	112
2	3	**New Jersey Devils**	84	47	25	12	306	220	106
3	7	**Washington Capitals**	84	39	35	10	277	263	88
4	8	**New York Islanders**	84	36	36	12	282	264	84
5	9	Florida Panthers	84	33	34	17	233	233	83
6	10	Philadelphia Flyers	84	35	39	10	294	314	80
7	12	Tampa Bay Lightning	84	30	43	11	224	251	71

Note: No. = Division rank, CR = Conference rank, W = Wins, L = Losses, T = Ties, GF = Goals For, GA = Goals Against, Pts = Points
Teams that qualified for the playoffs are highlighted in bold.

Eastern Conference
R		GP	W	L	T	GF	GA	Pts
**1**	**p-New York Rangers ***	**84**	**52**	**24**	**8**	**299**	**231**	**112**
**2**	**x-Pittsburgh Penguins ***	**84**	**44**	**27**	**13**	**299**	**285**	**101**
**3**	**New Jersey Devils**	**84**	**47**	**25**	**12**	**306**	**220**	**106**
**4**	**Boston Bruins**	**84**	**42**	**29**	**13**	**289**	**252**	**97**
**5**	**Montreal Canadiens**	**84**	**41**	**29**	**14**	**283**	**248**	**96**
**6**	**Buffalo Sabres**	**84**	**43**	**32**	**9**	**282**	**218**	**95**
**7**	**Washington Capitals**	**84**	**39**	**35**	**10**	**277**	**263**	**88**
**8**	**New York Islanders**	**84**	**36**	**36**	**12**	**282**	**264**	**84**
9	Florida Panthers	84	33	34	17	233	233	83
10	Philadelphia Flyers	84	35	39	10	294	314	80
11	Quebec Nordiques	84	34	42	8	277	292	76
12	Tampa Bay Lightning	84	30	43	11	224	251	71
13	Hartford Whalers	84	27	48	9	227	288	63
14	Ottawa Senators	84	14	61	9	201	397	37

Final standings

bold – Qualified for playoffs; x – Won division; p – Won Presidents' Trophy (and division); * – Division leader

== Schedule and results ==
=== Regular season ===
1993–94 regular season
October: 3–7–1 (home: 1–2–1; road: 2–5–0)

Game	Date	Score	Opponent	Record	Recap
1	October 5, 1993	1–2	@ Calgary Flames (1993–94)	0–1–0	L
2	October 8, 1993	1–5	@ Edmonton Oilers (1993–94)	0–2–0	L
3	October 10, 1993	4–3 OT	@ Mighty Ducks of Anaheim (1993–94)	1–2–0	W
4	October 12, 1993	5–7	@ Los Angeles Kings (1993–94)	1–3–0	L
5	October 16, 1993	3–6	New Jersey Devils (1993–94)	1–4–0	L
6	October 19, 1993	2–3	Pittsburgh Penguins (1993–94)	1–5–0	L
7	October 22, 1993	3–4	@ Philadelphia Flyers (1993–94)	1–6–0	L
8	October 23, 1993	5–5 OT	Ottawa Senators (1993–94)	1–6–1	T
9	October 26, 1993	7–0	Los Angeles Kings (1993–94)	2–6–1	W
10	October 28, 1993	2–5	@ Florida Panthers (1993–94)	2–7–1	L
11	October 29, 1993	4–2	@ Tampa Bay Lightning (1993–94)	3–7–1	W

November: 6–6–1 (home: 3–4–0; road: 3–2–1)

Game	Date	Score	Opponent	Record	Recap
12	November 2, 1993	1–2	Vancouver Canucks (1993–94)	3–8–1	L
13	November 4, 1993	2–4	@ Chicago Blackhawks (1993–94)	3–9–1	L
14	November 6, 1993	5–3	Hartford Whalers (1993–94)	4–9–1	W
15	November 9, 1993	2–5	Winnipeg Jets (1993–94)	4–10–1	L
16	November 10, 1993	3–5	@ New Jersey Devils (1993–94)	4–11–1	L
17	November 13, 1993	2–5	Boston Bruins (1993–94)	4–12–1	L
18	November 17, 1993	8–1	@ Ottawa Senators (1993–94)	5–12–1	W
19	November 18, 1993	5–1	@ Montreal Canadiens (1993–94)	6–12–1	W
20	November 21, 1993	5–4 OT	@ Philadelphia Flyers (1993–94)	7–12–1	W
21	November 24, 1993	2–2 OT	@ Dallas Stars (1993–94)	7–12–2	T
22	November 27, 1993	6–4	New York Rangers (1993–94)	8–12–2	W
23	November 28, 1993	1–4	Detroit Red Wings (1993–94)	8–13–2	L
24	November 30, 1993	6–4	Washington Capitals (1993–94)	9–13–2	W

December: 6–4–1 (home: 4–2–1; road: 2–2–0)

Game	Date	Score	Opponent	Record	Recap
25	December 2, 1993	3–7	@ Boston Bruins (1993–94)	9–14–2	L
26	December 3, 1993	2–3	Quebec Nordiques (1993–94)	9–15–2	L
27	December 7, 1993	4–4 OT	Edmonton Oilers (1993–94)	9–15–3	T
28	December 11, 1993	5–2	Philadelphia Flyers (1993–94)	10–15–3	W
29	December 14, 1993	4–1	New Jersey Devils (1993–94)	11–15–3	W
30	December 17, 1993	6–2	Toronto Maple Leafs (1993–94)	12–15–3	W
31	December 19, 1993	6–3	@ Pittsburgh Penguins (1993–94)	13–15–3	W
32	December 22, 1993	5–3	@ Montreal Canadiens (1993–94)	14–15–3	W
33	December 26, 1993	4–3 OT	Buffalo Sabres (1993–94)	15–15–3	W
34	December 28, 1993	0–3	Mighty Ducks of Anaheim (1993–94)	15–16–3	L
35	December 29, 1993	3–5	@ Quebec Nordiques (1993–94)	15–17–3	L

January: 2–8–2 (home: 2–3–1; road: 0–5–1)

Game	Date	Score	Opponent	Record	Recap
36	January 1, 1994	3–4	Hartford Whalers (1993–94)	15–18–3	L
37	January 4, 1994	3–6	@ New Jersey Devils (1993–94)	15–19–3	L
38	January 7, 1994	6–2	Calgary Flames (1993–94)	16–19–3	W
39	January 8, 1994	0–6	@ Hartford Whalers (1993–94)	16–20–3	L
40	January 10, 1994	3–3 OT	@ Ottawa Senators (1993–94)	16–20–4	T
41	January 14, 1994	5–2	Montreal Canadiens (1993–94)	17–20–4	W
42	January 15, 1994	5–5 OT	Chicago Blackhawks (1993–94)	17–20–5	T
43	January 17, 1994	1–2	Florida Panthers (1993–94)	17–21–5	L
44	January 19, 1994	3–4 OT	@ Tampa Bay Lightning (1993–94)	17–22–5	L
45	January 26, 1994	3–4	@ Toronto Maple Leafs (1993–94)	17–23–5	L
46	January 28, 1994	0–3	Boston Bruins (1993–94)	17–24–5	L
47	January 29, 1994	1–2	@ Boston Bruins (1993–94)	17–25–5	L

February: 9–4–1 (home: 7–1–0; road: 2–3–1)

Game	Date	Score	Opponent	Record	Recap
48	February 1, 1994	5–4	San Jose Sharks (1993–94)	18–25–5	W
49	February 2, 1994	4–4 OT	@ New York Rangers (1993–94)	18–25–6	T
50	February 5, 1994	3–2	@ Quebec Nordiques (1993–94)	19–25–6	W
51	February 6, 1994	1–4	@ Buffalo Sabres (1993–94)	19–26–6	L
52	February 8, 1994	3–1	Buffalo Sabres (1993–94)	20–26–6	W
53	February 10, 1994	5–3	@ Pittsburgh Penguins (1993–94)	21–26–6	W
54	February 12, 1994	3–4	Florida Panthers (1993–94)	21–27–6	L
55	February 15, 1994	2–1	Tampa Bay Lightning (1993–94)	22–27–6	W
56	February 18, 1994	1–3	@ Washington Capitals (1993–94)	22–28–6	L
57	February 19, 1994	4–0	Ottawa Senators (1993–94)	23–28–6	W
58	February 21, 1994	4–0	Washington Capitals (1993–94)	24–28–6	W
59	February 24, 1994	4–5 OT	@ Philadelphia Flyers (1993–94)	24–29–6	L
60	February 25, 1994	2–0	Philadelphia Flyers (1993–94)	25–29–6	W
61	February 27, 1994	5–2	Quebec Nordiques (1993–94)	26–29–6	W

March: 5–6–4 (home: 3–3–1; road: 2–3–3)

Game	Date	Score	Opponent	Record	Recap
62	March 1, 1994	4–2	St. Louis Blues (1993–94)	27–29–6	W
63	March 4, 1994	3–3 OT	@ New York Rangers (1993–94)	27–29–7	T
64	March 5, 1994	4–5	New York Rangers (1993–94)	27–30–7	L
65	March 7, 1994	7–2	@ Winnipeg Jets (1993–94)	28–30–7	W
66	March 9, 1994	4–5	@ Vancouver Canucks (1993–94)	28–31–7	L
67	March 10, 1994	3–4	@ San Jose Sharks (1993–94)	28–32–7	L
68	March 12, 1994	5–5 OT	@ St. Louis Blues (1993–94)	28–32–8	T
69	March 15, 1994	3–2	New Jersey Devils (1993–94)	29–32–8	W
70	March 17, 1994	3–1	@ Detroit Red Wings (1993–94)	30–32–8	W
71	March 18, 1994	2–2 OT	Buffalo Sabres (1993–94)	30–32–9	T
72	March 20, 1994	1–2	Pittsburgh Penguins (1993–94)	30–33–9	L
73	March 22, 1994	5–4 OT	Tampa Bay Lightning (1993–94)	31–33–9	W
74	March 26, 1994	1–3	Florida Panthers (1993–94)	31–34–9	L
75	March 27, 1994	1–4	@ Buffalo Sabres (1993–94)	31–35–9	L
76	March 29, 1994	2–2 OT	@ Washington Capitals (1993–94)	31–35–10	T

April: 5–1–2 (home: 3–0–0; road: 2–1–2)

Game	Date	Score	Opponent	Record	Recap
77	April 1, 1994	5–2	Montreal Canadiens (1993–94)	32–35–10	W
78	April 2, 1994	3–3 OT	@ Montreal Canadiens (1993–94)	32–35–11	T
79	April 5, 1994	4–3 OT	@ Washington Capitals (1993–94)	33–35–11	W
80	April 6, 1994	3–3 OT	@ Hartford Whalers (1993–94)	33–35–12	T
81	April 8, 1994	5–1	Dallas Stars (1993–94)	34–35–12	W
82	April 10, 1994	5–4	New York Rangers (1993–94)	35–35–12	W
83	April 13, 1994	2–0	@ Tampa Bay Lightning (1993–94)	36–35–12	W
84	April 14, 1994	1–4	@ Florida Panthers (1993–94)	36–36–12	L

Legend: W Win (2 points) L Loss (0 points) T Tie (1 point)

=== Playoffs ===
1994 Stanley Cup playoffs
Eastern Conference Quarterfinals vs. (1) New York Rangers – Rangers win 4–0

Game	Date	Score	Opponent	Series	Recap
1	April 17, 1994	0–6	@ New York Rangers	Rangers lead 1–0	L
2	April 18, 1994	0–6	@ New York Rangers	Rangers lead 2–0	L
3	April 21, 1994	1–5	New York Rangers	Rangers lead 3–0	L
4	April 24, 1994	2–5	New York Rangers	Rangers win 4–0	L

Legend: W Win L Loss

== Player statistics ==
Regular season
Scoring

Player	Pos	GP	G	A	Pts	PIM	+/-	PPG	SHG	GWG
Pierre Turgeon	C	69	38	56	94	18	14	10	4	6
Steve Thomas	LW	78	42	33	75	139	-9	17	0	5
Derek King	LW	78	30	40	70	59	18	10	0	7
Benoit Hogue	C	83	36	33	69	73	-7	9	5	3
Vladimir Malakhov	D	76	10	47	57	80	29	4	0	2
Marty McInnis	RW	81	25	31	56	24	31	3	5	3
Ray Ferraro	C	82	21	32	53	83	1	5	0	3
Pat Flatley	RW	64	12	30	42	40	12	2	1	2
Travis Green	C	83	18	22	40	44	16	1	0	2
Tom Kurvers	D	66	9	31	40	47	7	5	0	1
Brad Dalgarno	RW	73	11	19	30	62	14	3	0	1
Uwe Krupp	D	41	7	14	21	30	11	3	0	0
David Volek	W	32	5	9	14	10	0	2	0	0
Scott Lachance	D	74	3	11	14	70	-5	0	0	1
Dennis Vaske	D	65	2	11	13	76	21	0	0	0
Darius Kasparaitis	D	76	1	10	11	142	-6	0	0	0
Keith Acton	C	71	2	7	9	50	-1	0	0	0
David Maley	LW	37	0	6	6	74	-6	0	0	0
Wayne McBean	D	19	1	4	5	16	-13	0	0	0
Rich Pilon	D	28	1	4	5	75	-4	0	0	0
Mick Vukota	RW	72	3	1	4	237	-5	0	0	0
Chris Luongo	D	17	1	3	4	13	-1	0	0	0
Dean Chynoweth	D	39	0	4	4	122	3	0	0	0
Yan Kaminsky	RW	23	2	1	3	4	4	0	0	0
Ron Hextall	G	65	0	3	3	52	0	0	0	0
Claude Loiselle	C	17	1	1	2	49	-2	0	0	0
Dave Chyzowski	LW	3	1	0	1	4	-1	0	0	0
Jamie McLennan	G	22	0	1	1	6	0	0	0	0
Dan Plante	RW	12	0	1	1	4	-2	0	0	0
Derek Armstrong	C	1	0	0	0	0	0	0	0	0
Joe Day	C	24	0	0	0	30	-7	0	0	0
Tom Draper	G	7	0	0	0	0	0	0	0	0
Brent Grieve	LW	3	0	0	0	7	0	0	0	0
Steve Junker	LW	5	0	0	0	0	0	0	0	0
Bob McGill	D	3	0	0	0	5	0	0	0	0
Zigmund Palffy	RW	5	0	0	0	0	-6	0	0	0
Scott Scissons	C	1	0	0	0	0	0	0	0	0
Jason Simon	LW	4	0	0	0	34	0	0	0	0

Goaltending

Player	MIN	GP	W	L	T	GA	GAA	SO	SA	SV	SV%
Ron Hextall	3581	65	27	26	6	184	3.08	5	1801	1617	.898
Jamie McLennan	1287	22	8	7	6	61	2.84	0	639	578	.905
Tom Draper	227	7	1	3	0	16	4.23	0	118	102	.864
Team:	5095	84	36	36	12	261	3.07	5	2558	2297	.898

Playoffs
Scoring

Player	Pos	GP	G	A	Pts	PIM	+/-	PPG	SHG	GWG
Ray Ferraro	C	4	1	0	1	6	-2	0	0	0
Dan Plante	RW	1	1	0	1	2	0	0	0	0
Steve Thomas	LW	4	1	0	1	8	-5	1	0	0
Brad Dalgarno	RW	4	0	1	1	4	-2	0	0	0
Benoit Hogue	C	4	0	1	1	4	-3	0	0	0
Derek King	LW	4	0	1	1	0	-3	0	0	0
Uwe Krupp	D	4	0	1	1	4	-3	0	0	0
Pierre Turgeon	C	4	0	1	1	0	-4	0	0	0
Dennis Vaske	D	4	0	1	1	2	-1	0	0	0
Keith Acton	C	4	0	0	0	8	0	0	0	0
Dean Chynoweth	D	2	0	0	0	2	-1	0	0	0
Dave Chyzowski	LW	2	0	0	0	0	-1	0	0	0
Travis Green	C	4	0	0	0	2	-5	0	0	0
Ron Hextall	G	3	0	0	0	4	0	0	0	0
Yan Kaminsky	RW	2	0	0	0	4	-1	0	0	0
Darius Kasparaitis	D	4	0	0	0	8	-6	0	0	0
Tom Kurvers	D	3	0	0	0	2	-4	0	0	0
Scott Lachance	D	3	0	0	0	0	-5	0	0	0
Vladimir Malakhov	D	4	0	0	0	6	-5	0	0	0
David Maley	LW	3	0	0	0	0	-2	0	0	0
Marty McInnis	RW	4	0	0	0	0	-5	0	0	0
Jamie McLennan	G	2	0	0	0	0	0	0	0	0
Mick Vukota	RW	4	0	0	0	17	0	0	0	0

Goaltending

Player	MIN	GP	W	L	GA	GAA	SO	SA	SV	SV%
Ron Hextall	158	3	0	3	16	6.08	0	80	64	.800
Jamie McLennan	82	2	0	1	6	4.39	0	47	41	.872
Team:	240	4	0	4	22	5.50	0	127	105	.827

Note: Pos = Position; GP = Games played; G = Goals; A = Assists; Pts = Points; +/- = plus/minus; PIM = Penalty minutes; PPG = Power-play goals; SHG = Short-handed goals; GWG = Game-winning goals
MIN = Minutes played; W = Wins; L = Losses; T = Ties; GA = Goals-against; GAA = Goals-against average; SO = Shutouts; SA = Shots against; SV = Shots saved; SV% = Save percentage;

== Draft picks ==
New York's draft picks at the 1993 NHL entry draft held at the Quebec Coliseum in Quebec City, Quebec.

Round	#	Player	Nationality	College/Junior/Club team (League)
1	23	Todd Bertuzzi	Canada	Guelph Storm (OHL)
2	40	Bryan McCabe	Canada	Spokane Chiefs (WHL)
3	66	Vladimir Chebaturkin	Russia	Kristall Elektrostal (Russia)
4	92	Warren Luhning	Canada	Calgary Royals (AJHL)
5	118	Tommy Salo	Sweden	VIK Västerås HK (Sweden)
6	144	Peter Leboutillier	Canada	Red Deer Rebels (WHL)
7	170	Darren Van Impe	Canada	Red Deer Rebels (WHL)
8	196	Rod Hinks	Canada	Sudbury Wolves (OHL)
9	222	Daniel Johansson	Sweden	Rögle BK (Sweden)
10	248	Stephane Larocque	Canada	Sherbrooke Faucons (QMJHL)
11	274	Carl Charland	Canada	Hull Olympiques (QMJHL)

== See also ==
- 1993–94 NHL season
