= 1993–94 Boston Bruins season =

Ice hockey team season

1993–94 Boston Bruins
- Division: 2nd Northeast
- Conference: 4th Eastern
- 1993–94 record: 42–29–13
- Home record: 20–14–8
- Road record: 22–15–5
- Goals for: 289
- Goals against: 252

Team information
- General manager: Harry Sinden
- Coach: Brian Sutter
- Captain: Ray Bourque
- Alternate captains: Cam Neely; Adam Oates
- Arena: Boston Garden
- Minor league affiliates: Providence Bruins (AHL); Charlotte Checkers (ECHL)

Team leaders
- Goals: Cam Neely (50)
- Assists: Adam Oates (80)
- Points: Adam Oates (112)
- Penalty minutes: Glen Featherstone (152)
- Plus/minus: Don Sweeney (+29)
- Wins: Jon Casey (30)
- Goals against average: Jon Casey (2.88)

The 1993–94 Boston Bruins season was the Bruins' 70th season. The season involved Cam Neely scoring 50 goals in 44 games, however, the Bruins had already played 66 games; making this an unofficial record.

The Bruins reached the second round in the Stanley Cup playoffs, beating the Montreal Canadiens before losing to the New Jersey Devils.

== Regular season ==
The Bruins had 2,980 shots on goal during the regular season, second only to the Detroit Red Wings. They tied the Buffalo Sabres and Tampa Bay Lightning for the fewest power-play goals against (58). On Sunday, March 27, 1994, the Bruins scored three short-handed goals in a 6–4 win over the Washington Capitals.

=== Final standings ===
Northeast Division
No.	CR		GP	W	L	T	GF	GA	Pts
1	2	**Pittsburgh Penguins**	84	44	27	13	299	285	101
2	4	**Boston Bruins**	84	42	29	13	289	252	97
3	5	**Montreal Canadiens**	84	41	29	14	283	248	96
4	6	**Buffalo Sabres**	84	43	32	9	282	218	95
5	11	Quebec Nordiques	84	34	42	8	277	292	76
6	13	Hartford Whalers	84	27	48	9	227	288	63
7	14	Ottawa Senators	84	14	61	9	201	397	37

Note: No. = Division rank, CR = Conference rank, W = Wins, L = Losses, T = Ties, GF = Goals For, GA = Goals Against, Pts = Points
Teams that qualified for the playoffs are highlighted in bold.

Eastern Conference
R		GP	W	L	T	GF	GA	Pts
**1**	**p-New York Rangers ***	**84**	**52**	**24**	**8**	**299**	**231**	**112**
**2**	**x-Pittsburgh Penguins ***	**84**	**44**	**27**	**13**	**299**	**285**	**101**
**3**	**New Jersey Devils**	**84**	**47**	**25**	**12**	**306**	**220**	**106**
**4**	**Boston Bruins**	**84**	**42**	**29**	**13**	**289**	**252**	**97**
**5**	**Montreal Canadiens**	**84**	**41**	**29**	**14**	**283**	**248**	**96**
**6**	**Buffalo Sabres**	**84**	**43**	**32**	**9**	**282**	**218**	**95**
**7**	**Washington Capitals**	**84**	**39**	**35**	**10**	**277**	**263**	**88**
**8**	**New York Islanders**	**84**	**36**	**36**	**12**	**282**	**264**	**84**
9	Florida Panthers	84	33	34	17	233	233	83
10	Philadelphia Flyers	84	35	39	10	294	314	80
11	Quebec Nordiques	84	34	42	8	277	292	76
12	Tampa Bay Lightning	84	30	43	11	224	251	71
13	Hartford Whalers	84	27	48	9	227	288	63
14	Ottawa Senators	84	14	61	9	201	397	37

Final standings

bold – Qualified for playoffs; x – Won division; p – Won Presidents' Trophy (and division); * – Division leader

== Playoffs ==
In the Conference Quarterfinals the Bruins met the defending champion Montreal Canadiens led by goalie Patrick Roy. The Bruins finished the season one point ahead of the Canadiens but had a losing 1–2–2 record over the season series between the two teams. The opening round playoff series was back and forth with the Canadiens holding a 3–2 series lead by Game 5. The Bruins rallied and won the last two games of the series in order to advance to the next round. This was the last time the Bruins reached at least the second round until the 1998–99 season.

In the second round Eastern Conference semifinal series the Bruins were matched with the New Jersey Devils, who under the eventual 93–94 coach of the year winner, Jacques Lemaire, implemented the neutral zone trap. The Bruins jumped ahead to a 2–0 series lead by taking the opening two games. However the Devils rebounded and eliminated the Bruins, winning the next four games straight.

The Bruins were without forward and leading scorer Cam Neely due to a knee injury. Their top scorer in the playoffs was center Adam Oates with 12 points (3 goals, 9 assists).

== Schedule and results ==
=== Regular season ===
1993–94 regular season
October: 4–3–4 (home: 2–2–1; road: 2–1–3)

Game	Date	Score	Opponent	Record	Recap
1	October 5, 1993	4–3	@ New York Rangers (1993–94)	1–0–0	W
2	October 7, 1993	3–5	Buffalo Sabres (1993–94)	1–1–0	L
3	October 9, 1993	7–3	Quebec Nordiques (1993–94)	2–1–0	W
4	October 11, 1993	1–1 OT	Montreal Canadiens (1993–94)	2–1–1	T
5	October 15, 1993	1–1 OT	@ Mighty Ducks of Anaheim (1993–94)	2–1–2	T
6	October 16, 1993	1–1 OT	@ San Jose Sharks (1993–94)	2–1–3	T
7	October 19, 1993	4–5	@ Vancouver Canucks (1993–94)	2–2–3	L
8	October 22, 1993	3–1	@ Edmonton Oilers (1993–94)	3–2–3	W
9	October 23, 1993	3–3 OT	@ Calgary Flames (1993–94)	3–2–4	T
10	October 28, 1993	6–2	Ottawa Senators (1993–94)	4–2–4	W
11	October 30, 1993	1–2	St. Louis Blues (1993–94)	4–3–4	L

November: 8–3–2 (home: 4–0–2; road: 4–3–0)

Game	Date	Score	Opponent	Record	Recap
12	November 2, 1993	1–6	@ Detroit Red Wings (1993–94)	4–4–4	L
13	November 4, 1993	6–3	Calgary Flames (1993–94)	5–4–4	W
14	November 6, 1993	1–1 OT	Tampa Bay Lightning (1993–94)	5–4–5	T
15	November 7, 1993	4–3	@ Buffalo Sabres (1993–94)	6–4–5	W
16	November 11, 1993	5–1	Edmonton Oilers (1993–94)	7–4–5	W
17	November 13, 1993	5–2	@ New York Islanders (1993–94)	8–4–5	W
18	November 17, 1993	4–2	@ Hartford Whalers (1993–94)	9–4–5	W
19	November 18, 1993	3–1	San Jose Sharks (1993–94)	10–4–5	W
20	November 20, 1993	5–5 OT	Philadelphia Flyers (1993–94)	10–4–6	T
21	November 24, 1993	3–7	@ Pittsburgh Penguins (1993–94)	10–5–6	L
22	November 26, 1993	3–2	Florida Panthers (1993–94)	11–5–6	W
23	November 27, 1993	2–4	@ Toronto Maple Leafs (1993–94)	11–6–6	L
24	November 30, 1993	5–2	@ Quebec Nordiques (1993–94)	12–6–6	W

December: 5–6–1 (home: 1–5–1; road: 4–1–0)

Game	Date	Score	Opponent	Record	Recap
25	December 2, 1993	7–3	New York Islanders (1993–94)	13–6–6	W
26	December 4, 1993	1–8	Montreal Canadiens (1993–94)	13–7–6	L
27	December 5, 1993	1–3	@ Buffalo Sabres (1993–94)	13–8–6	L
28	December 9, 1993	2–3 OT	Vancouver Canucks (1993–94)	13–9–6	L
29	December 11, 1993	4–5	Chicago Blackhawks (1993–94)	13–10–6	L
30	December 12, 1993	2–2 OT	Hartford Whalers (1993–94)	13–10–7	T
31	December 15, 1993	5–4	@ New Jersey Devils (1993–94)	14–10–7	W
32	December 18, 1993	5–3	@ Tampa Bay Lightning (1993–94)	15–10–7	W
33	December 19, 1993	2–1 OT	@ Florida Panthers (1993–94)	16–10–7	W
34	December 23, 1993	3–4	Pittsburgh Penguins (1993–94)	16–11–7	L
35	December 27, 1993	5–3	@ Ottawa Senators (1993–94)	17–11–7	W
36	December 31, 1993	3–4	Philadelphia Flyers (1993–94)	17–12–7	L

January: 8–4–2 (home: 5–2–1; road: 3–2–1)

Game	Date	Score	Opponent	Record	Recap
37	January 2, 1994	8–2	Washington Capitals (1993–94)	18–12–7	W
38	January 6, 1994	5–4	Winnipeg Jets (1993–94)	19–12–7	W
39	January 8, 1994	2–2 OT	Florida Panthers (1993–94)	19–12–8	T
40	January 10, 1994	0–3	Toronto Maple Leafs (1993–94)	19–13–8	L
41	January 11, 1994	4–5 OT	@ Pittsburgh Penguins (1993–94)	19–14–8	L
42	January 13, 1994	2–6	@ Philadelphia Flyers (1993–94)	19–15–8	L
43	January 15, 1994	2–3	Detroit Red Wings (1993–94)	19–16–8	L
44	January 17, 1994	5–3	Hartford Whalers (1993–94)	20–16–8	W
45	January 19, 1994	3–3 OT	@ Montreal Canadiens (1993–94)	20–16–9	T
46	January 24, 1994	2–1	@ Hartford Whalers (1993–94)	21–16–9	W
47	January 25, 1994	3–1	@ Washington Capitals (1993–94)	22–16–9	W
48	January 28, 1994	3–0	@ New York Islanders (1993–94)	23–16–9	W
49	January 29, 1994	2–1	New York Islanders (1993–94)	24–16–9	W
50	January 31, 1994	4–3	Quebec Nordiques (1993–94)	25–16–9	W

February: 8–3–2 (home: 2–1–1; road: 6–2–1)

Game	Date	Score	Opponent	Record	Recap
51	February 3, 1994	0–3	New York Rangers (1993–94)	25–17–9	L
52	February 5, 1994	4–0	Philadelphia Flyers (1993–94)	26–17–9	W
53	February 6, 1994	0–3	@ Florida Panthers (1993–94)	26–18–9	L
54	February 8, 1994	6–1	@ Quebec Nordiques (1993–94)	27–18–9	W
55	February 10, 1994	3–3 OT	Buffalo Sabres (1993–94)	27–18–10	T
56	February 12, 1994	5–3	New Jersey Devils (1993–94)	28–18–10	W
57	February 14, 1994	3–2 OT	@ Los Angeles Kings (1993–94)	29–18–10	W
58	February 16, 1994	3–0	@ Dallas Stars (1993–94)	30–18–10	W
59	February 18, 1994	1–3	@ St. Louis Blues (1993–94)	30–19–10	L
60	February 20, 1994	2–2 OT	@ Tampa Bay Lightning (1993–94)	30–19–11	T
61	February 23, 1994	6–3	@ New York Rangers (1993–94)	31–19–11	W
62	February 25, 1994	7–6	@ Winnipeg Jets (1993–94)	32–19–11	W
63	February 27, 1994	4–0	@ Chicago Blackhawks (1993–94)	33–19–11	W

March: 6–6–2 (home: 5–2–2; road: 1–4–0)

Game	Date	Score	Opponent	Record	Recap
64	March 3, 1994	6–4	Los Angeles Kings (1993–94)	34–19–11	W
65	March 5, 1994	6–1	Ottawa Senators (1993–94)	35–19–11	W
66	March 7, 1994	6–3	Washington Capitals (1993–94)	36–19–11	W
67	March 8, 1994	3–7	@ Pittsburgh Penguins (1993–94)	36–20–11	L
68	March 10, 1994	2–2 OT	New York Rangers (1993–94)	36–20–12	T
69	March 12, 1994	1–2	@ New Jersey Devils (1993–94)	36–21–12	L
70	March 14, 1994	4–5	@ Montreal Canadiens (1993–94)	36–22–12	L
71	March 17, 1994	2–4	Pittsburgh Penguins (1993–94)	36–23–12	L
72	March 19, 1994	6–8	New Jersey Devils (1993–94)	36–24–12	L
73	March 22, 1994	3–5	@ Quebec Nordiques (1993–94)	36–25–12	L
74	March 24, 1994	5–3	Mighty Ducks of Anaheim (1993–94)	37–25–12	W
75	March 26, 1994	6–3	Montreal Canadiens (1993–94)	38–25–12	W
76	March 27, 1994	6–4	@ Washington Capitals (1993–94)	39–25–12	W
77	March 31, 1994	2–2 OT	Dallas Stars (1993–94)	39–25–13	T

April: 3–4–0 (home: 1–2–0; road: 2–2–0)

Game	Date	Score	Opponent	Record	Recap
78	April 1, 1994	0–5	@ Buffalo Sabres (1993–94)	39–26–13	L
79	April 3, 1994	2–6	@ Pittsburgh Penguins (1993–94)	39–27–13	L
80	April 7, 1994	5–4	Ottawa Senators (1993–94)	40–27–13	W
81	April 9, 1994	0–3	Tampa Bay Lightning (1993–94)	40–28–13	L
82	April 10, 1994	4–3	@ Philadelphia Flyers (1993–94)	41–28–13	W
83	April 13, 1994	8–0	@ Ottawa Senators (1993–94)	42–28–13	W
84	April 14, 1994	2–3	Hartford Whalers (1993–94)	42–29–13	L

Legend: W Win (2 points) L Loss (0 points) T Tie (1 point)

=== Playoffs ===
1994 Stanley Cup playoffs
Eastern Conference Quarterfinals vs. (5) Montreal Canadiens – Bruins win 4–3

Game	Date	Score	Opponent	Series	Recap
1	April 16, 1994	3–2	Montreal Canadiens	Bruins lead 1–0	W
2	April 18, 1994	2–3	Montreal Canadiens	Series tied 1–1	L
3	April 21, 1994	6–3	@ Montreal Canadiens	Bruins lead 2–1	W
4	April 23, 1994	2–5	@ Montreal Canadiens	Series tied 2–2	L
5	April 25, 1994	1–2 OT	Montreal Canadiens	Canadiens lead 3–2	L
6	April 27, 1994	3–2	@ Montreal Canadiens	Series tied 3–3	W
7	April 29, 1994	5–3	Montreal Canadiens	Bruins win 4–3	W

Eastern Conference Semifinals vs. (3) New Jersey Devils – Devils win 4–2

Game	Date	Score	Opponent	Series	Recap
1	May 1, 1994	2–1	@ New Jersey Devils	Bruins lead 1–0	W
2	May 3, 1994	6–5 OT	@ New Jersey Devils	Bruins lead 2–0	W
3	May 5, 1994	2–4	New Jersey Devils	Bruins lead 2–1	L
4	May 7, 1994	4–5 OT	New Jersey Devils	Series tied 2–2	L
5	May 9, 1994	0–2	@ New Jersey Devils	Devils win 3–2	L
6	May 11, 1994	3–5	New Jersey Devils	Devils win 4–2	L

Legend: W Win L Loss

== Player statistics ==
=== Skaters ===
Regular season
Player	GP	G	A	Pts	+/-	PIM
Adam Oates	77	32	80	112	10	45
Ray Bourque	72	20	71	91	26	58
Cam Neely	49	50	24	74	12	54
Joe Juneau ‡	63	14	58	72	11	35
Glen Wesley	81	14	44	58	1	64
Ted Donato	84	22	32	54	0	59
Bryan Smolinski	83	31	20	51	4	82
Glen Murray	81	18	13	31	-1	48
Brent Hughes	77	13	11	24	10	143
Jozef Stümpel	59	8	15	23	4	14
Dave Reid	83	6	17	23	10	25
Steve Heinze	77	10	11	21	-2	32
Don Sweeney	75	6	15	21	29	50
Dmitri Kvartalnov	39	12	7	19	-9	10
Stephen Leach	42	5	10	15	-10	74
Al Iafrate †	12	5	8	13	6	20
Daniel Marois	22	7	3	10	-4	18
Paul Stanton	71	3	7	10	-7	54
David Shaw	55	1	9	10	-11	85
Cam Stewart	57	3	6	9	-6	66
Glen Featherstone	58	1	8	9	-5	152
Gordie Roberts	59	1	6	7	-13	40
Fred Knipscheer	11	3	2	5	3	14
Mariusz Czerkawski	4	2	1	3	-2	0
Sergei Zholtok	24	2	1	3	-7	2
Darren Banks	4	0	1	1	0	9
John Gruden	7	0	1	1	-3	2
Jamie Huscroft	36	0	1	1	-2	144
Andrew McKim	29	0	1	1	-10	4
Jon Morris	4	0	0	0	-2	0
Grigori Panteleev	10	0	0	0	-2	0
Mikhail Tatarinov	2	0	0	0	0	2
Jim Wiemer	4	0	0	0	-3	2
Total		289	483	772	—	1,407

Playoffs
Player	GP	G	A	Pts	+/-	PIM
Adam Oates	13	3	9	12	-3	8
Ray Bourque	13	2	8	10	-5	0
Bryan Smolinski	13	5	4	9	-1	4
Glen Murray	13	4	5	9	-2	14
Jozef Stumpel	13	1	7	8	0	4
Ted Donato	13	4	2	6	-1	10
Mariusz Czerkawski	13	3	3	6	-1	4
Glen Wesley	13	3	3	6	0	12
Steve Heinze	13	2	3	5	6	7
Al Iafrate	13	3	1	4	-2	6
Brent Hughes	13	2	1	3	-3	27
Fred Knipscheer	12	2	1	3	0	6
Dave Reid	13	2	1	3	-1	2
Don Sweeney	12	2	1	3	-2	4
David Shaw	13	1	2	3	4	16
Cam Stewart	8	0	3	3	0	7
Stephen Leach	5	0	1	1	-2	2
Daniel Marois	11	0	1	1	-1	16
Gordie Roberts	12	0	1	1	0	8
Glen Featherstone	1	0	0	0	1	0
Jamie Huscroft	4	0	0	0	1	9
Total		39	57	96	—	166

=== Goaltending ===
Regular season
Player	GP	GS	TOI	W	L	T	GA	GAA	SA	SV%	SO	G	A	PIM
Jon Casey	57	56	3,191:47	30	15	9	153	2.88	1,289	.881	4	0	2	14
Vincent Riendeau †	18	14	975:59	7	6	1	50	3.07	415	.880	1	0	1	0
John Blue	18	14	944:07	5	8	3	47	2.99	407	.885	0	0	0	7
Total			5,111:53	42	29	13	250	2.93	2,111	.882	5	0	3	21

Playoffs
Player	GP	GS	TOI	W	L	GA	GAA	SA	SV%	SO	G	A	PIM
Jon Casey	11	11	698:16	5	6	34	2.92	308	.890	0	0	0	0
Vincent Riendeau	2	2	120:00	1	1	8	4.00	42	.810	0	0	0	0
Total			818:16	6	7	42	3.08	350	.880	0	0	0	0

† Denotes player spent time with another team before joining the Bruins. Stats reflect time with the Bruins only.
‡ Denotes player was traded mid-season. Stats reflect time with the Bruins only.

Note:

Pos = Position;GP = Games played; G = Goals; A = Assists; Pts = Points; PIM = Penalty minutes; +/- = Plus/minus; PPG = Power-play goals; SHG = Short-handed goals; GWG = Game-winning goals
Pos = Position;GP = Games played; Min, TOI = Minutes played; W = Wins; L = Losses; T,T/OT = Ties; OTL = Overtime losses; GA = Goals-against; GAA = Goals-against average; SO = Shutouts; SA = Shots against; SV = Shots saved;SV% = Save percentage;

== Awards and honors ==
James Norris Trophy

- Ray Bourque

== Draft picks ==
Boston's draft picks at the 1993 NHL entry draft held at the Quebec Coliseum in Quebec City, Quebec.

Round	#	Player	Position	Nationality	College/Junior/Club team (League)
1	25	Kevyn Adams	C	United States	Miami University (CCHA)
2	51	Matt Alvey	RW	United States	Springfield Olympics (NEJHL)
4^{1}	88	Charles Paquette	D	Canada	Sherbrooke Faucons (QMJHL)
4	103	Shawn Bates	C	United States	Medford High School (USHS-MA)
5	129	Andrei Sapozhnikov	D	Russia	Traktor Chelyabinsk (IHL)
6	155	Milt Mastad	D	Canada	Seattle Thunderbirds (WHL)
7	181	Ryan Golden	C	United States	Reading Memorial High School (USHS-MA)
8	207	Hal Gill	D	United States	Providence College (Hockey East)
9	233	Joel Prpic	C	Canada	Waterloo Black Hawks (USHL)
10	259	Joakim Persson	C	Sweden	Hammarby IF (Sweden)

Notes

1. The Bruins acquired this pick as the result of a trade on January 2, 1992, that sent Garry Galley, Wes Walz and a third-round pick in 1993 to Philadelphia in exchange for Gord Murphy, Brian Dobbin, a third-round pick in 1992 and this pick.
- The Bruins third-round pick went to the Philadelphia Flyers as the result of a trade on January 2, 1992, that sent Gord Murphy, Brian Dobbin, a third-round pick in 1992 and a fourth-round pick in 1993 to Boston in exchange for Garry Galley, Wes Walz and this pick (77th overall).
- The Bruins eleventh-round pick went to the Winnipeg Jets as the result of a trade on February 21, 1993, that sent Troy Murray to Chicago in exchange for Steve Bancroft and this pick (285th overall).

Chicago previously acquired this pick as the result of a trade on January 8, 1992 that sent an eleventh-round pick in 1992 to Boston in exchange for Steve Bancroft and this pick.
