= 1993–94 Montreal Canadiens season =

Ice hockey team season

1993–94 Montreal Canadiens
- Division: 3rd Northeast
- Conference: 5th Eastern
- 1993–94 record: 41–29–14
- Home record: 26–12–4
- Road record: 15–17–10
- Goals for: 283
- Goals against: 248

Team information
- General manager: Serge Savard
- Coach: Jacques Demers
- Captain: Guy Carbonneau
- Alternate captains: J. J. Daigneault; Kirk Muller
- Arena: Montreal Forum
- Minor league affiliates: Fredericton Canadiens; Wheeling Thunderbirds

Team leaders
- Goals: Vincent Damphousse (40)
- Assists: Vincent Damphousse (51)
- Points: Vincent Damphousse (91)
- Penalty minutes: Lyle Odelein (276)
- Plus/minus: John LeClair (+17)
- Wins: Patrick Roy (35)
- Goals against average: Patrick Roy (2.50)

The 1993–94 Montreal Canadiens season was the team's 85th season of play. The defending Stanley Cup champions could not repeat, being eliminated in the Eastern Conference Quarterfinals by the Boston Bruins four games to three. It was the last time at the Forum that the playoffs were played. In addition, it was the first time in eleven years that the Canadiens did not advance past the first round of the playoffs.

== Off-season ==
- In the off-season, Patrick Roy signed a new four-year, $16 million contract.

== Regular season ==
For the season, Roy had 35 wins, 17 losses and 11 ties. Without him in net, the Canadiens had 6 wins, 12 losses and 3 ties. The Canadiens ended the season on a sour note. They had 3 wins and 9 losses in their last 12 games, including a 9–0 loss to the Detroit Red Wings. Vincent Damphousse finished the season with 40 goals, the last time a Canadiens player achieved the feat before Cole Caufield in 2026.

=== Season standings ===
Northeast Division
No.	CR		GP	W	L	T	GF	GA	Pts
1	2	**Pittsburgh Penguins**	84	44	27	13	299	285	101
2	4	**Boston Bruins**	84	42	29	13	289	252	97
3	5	**Montreal Canadiens**	84	41	29	14	283	248	96
4	6	**Buffalo Sabres**	84	43	32	9	282	218	95
5	11	Quebec Nordiques	84	34	42	8	277	292	76
6	13	Hartford Whalers	84	27	48	9	227	288	63
7	14	Ottawa Senators	84	14	61	9	201	397	37

Note: No. = Division rank, CR = Conference rank, W = Wins, L = Losses, T = Ties, GF = Goals For, GA = Goals Against, Pts = Points
Teams that qualified for the playoffs are highlighted in bold.

Eastern Conference
R		GP	W	L	T	GF	GA	Pts
**1**	**p-New York Rangers ***	**84**	**52**	**24**	**8**	**299**	**231**	**112**
**2**	**x-Pittsburgh Penguins ***	**84**	**44**	**27**	**13**	**299**	**285**	**101**
**3**	**New Jersey Devils**	**84**	**47**	**25**	**12**	**306**	**220**	**106**
**4**	**Boston Bruins**	**84**	**42**	**29**	**13**	**289**	**252**	**97**
**5**	**Montreal Canadiens**	**84**	**41**	**29**	**14**	**283**	**248**	**96**
**6**	**Buffalo Sabres**	**84**	**43**	**32**	**9**	**282**	**218**	**95**
**7**	**Washington Capitals**	**84**	**39**	**35**	**10**	**277**	**263**	**88**
**8**	**New York Islanders**	**84**	**36**	**36**	**12**	**282**	**264**	**84**
9	Florida Panthers	84	33	34	17	233	233	83
10	Philadelphia Flyers	84	35	39	10	294	314	80
11	Quebec Nordiques	84	34	42	8	277	292	76
12	Tampa Bay Lightning	84	30	43	11	224	251	71
13	Hartford Whalers	84	27	48	9	227	288	63
14	Ottawa Senators	84	14	61	9	201	397	37

Final standings

bold – Qualified for playoffs; x – Won division; p – Won Presidents' Trophy (and division); * – Division leader

== Schedule and results ==
=== Regular season ===
1993–94 regular season
October: 7–3–2 (home: 5–1–0; road: 2–2–2)

Game	Date	Score	Opponent	Record	Recap
1	October 6, 1993	4–3	Hartford Whalers	1–0–0	W
2	October 7, 1993	1–2 OT	@ Pittsburgh Penguins	1–1–0	L
3	October 9, 1993	7–4	Buffalo Sabres	2–1–0	W
4	October 11, 1993	1–1	@ Boston Bruins	2–1–1	T
5	October 13, 1993	3–4	@ Hartford Whalers	2–2–1	L
6	October 16, 1993	2–5	Quebec Nordiques	2–3–1	L
7	October 18, 1993	4–2	@ Quebec Nordiques	3–3–1	W
8	October 20, 1993	5–2	Dallas Stars	4–3–1	W
9	October 23, 1993	4–1	Mighty Ducks of Anaheim	5–3–1	W
10	October 26, 1993	2–0	@ New Jersey Devils	6–3–1	W
11	October 28, 1993	3–3	@ New York Rangers	6–3–2	T
12	October 30, 1993	5–2	Toronto Maple Leafs	7–3–2	W

November: 4–6–1 (home: 3–4–1; road: 1–2–0)

Game	Date	Score	Opponent	Record	Recap
13	November 3, 1993	1–0	Tampa Bay Lightning	8–3–2	W
14	November 6, 1993	3–4	Calgary Flames	8–4–2	L
15	November 10, 1993	1–3	Florida Panthers	8–5–2	L
16	November 13, 1993	2–3 OT	Ottawa Senators	8–6–2	L
17	November 15, 1993	4–2	@ Ottawa Senators	9–6–2	W
18	November 17, 1993	3–1	Edmonton Oilers	10–6–2	W
19^{[a]}	November 18, 1993	1–5	New York Islanders	10–7–2	L
20	November 20, 1993	2–2	Pittsburgh Penguins	10–7–3	T
21	November 23, 1993	4–5	@ New York Rangers	10–8–3	L
22	November 24, 1993	2–9	@ Philadelphia Flyers	10–9–3	L
23	November 27, 1993	4–0	Los Angeles Kings	11–9–3	W
Notes:^{a} Neutral site game played at the Copps Coliseum in Hamilton, Ontario.

December: 5–6–3 (home: 2–4–0; road: 3–2–3)

Game	Date	Score	Opponent	Record	Recap
24	December 1, 1993	3–6	Ottawa Senators	11–10–3	L
25	December 3, 1993	2–2	@ Washington Capitals	11–10–4	T
26	December 4, 1993	8–1	@ Boston Bruins	12–10–4	W
27	December 6, 1993	4–3 OT	Vancouver Canucks	13–10–4	W
28	December 8, 1993	2–4	New Jersey Devils	13–11–4	L
29	December 11, 1993	3–5	Washington Capitals	13–12–4	L
30	December 14, 1993	1–1	@ Tampa Bay Lightning	13–12–5	T
31	December 15, 1993	3–3	@ Florida Panthers	13–12–6	T
32	December 18, 1993	8–1	Detroit Red Wings	14–12–6	W
33	December 22, 1993	3–5	New York Islanders	14–13–6	L
34	December 23, 1993	0–5	@ Buffalo Sabres	14–14–6	L
35	December 27, 1993	5–2	@ St. Louis Blues	15–14–6	W
36	December 29, 1993	3–6	@ Edmonton Oilers	15–15–6	L
37	December 31, 1993	5–2	@ Calgary Flames	16–15–6	W

January: 8–4–2 (home: 5–2–1; road: 3–2–1)

Game	Date	Score	Opponent	Record	Recap
38	January 2, 1994	3–2	@ Vancouver Canucks	17–15–6	W
39	January 4, 1994	2–2	@ San Jose Sharks	17–15–7	T
40^{[b]}	January 5, 1994	4–0	@ Quebec Nordiques	18–15–7	W
41	January 8, 1994	3–2	New York Rangers	19–15–7	W
42	January 10, 1994	4–2	Winnipeg Jets	20–15–7	W
43	January 12, 1994	3–2	New Jersey Devils	21–15–7	W
44	January 14, 1994	2–5	@ New York Islanders	21–16–7	L
45	January 15, 1994	2–5	Florida Panthers	21–17–7	L
46	January 17, 1994	3–1	Washington Capitals	22–17–7	W
47	January 19, 1994	3–3	Boston Bruins	22–17–8	T
48	January 24, 1994	3–8	@ Florida Panthers	22–18–8	L
49	January 26, 1994	3–0	@ Hartford Whalers	23–18–8	W
50	January 29, 1994	2–3	Buffalo Sabres	23–19–8	L
51	January 30, 1994	5–4 OT	Philadelphia Flyers	24–19–8	W
Notes:^{b} Neutral site game played at the America West Arena in Phoenix, Arizona.

February: 9–3–1 (home: 5–0–0; road: 4–3–1)

Game	Date	Score	Opponent	Record	Recap
52	February 2, 1994	9–2	Hartford Whalers	25–19–8	W
53	February 4, 1994	4–0	@ Washington Capitals	26–19–8	W
54	February 5, 1994	4–3	@ Ottawa Senators	27–19–8	W
55	February 7, 1994	4–1	@ Pittsburgh Penguins	28–19–8	W
56	February 9, 1994	4–3 OT	New York Rangers	29–19–8	W
57	February 11, 1994	1–5	@ Buffalo Sabres	29–20–8	L
58	February 12, 1994	5–2	Quebec Nordiques	30–20–8	W
59	February 17, 1994	3–4	@ Tampa Bay Lightning	30–21–8	L
60	February 19, 1994	4–1	Pittsburgh Penguins	31–21–8	W
61	February 21, 1994	7–8	@ Philadelphia Flyers	31–22–8	L
62	February 23, 1994	3–1	San Jose Sharks	32–22–8	W
63	February 26, 1994	3–0	@ Toronto Maple Leafs	33–22–8	W
64	February 28, 1994	3–3	@ Los Angeles Kings	33–22–9	T

March: 6–3–4 (home: 5–0–1; road: 1–3–3)

Game	Date	Score	Opponent	Record	Recap
65	March 2, 1994	5–2	@ Mighty Ducks of Anaheim	34–22–9	W
66	March 6, 1994	2–2	@ Dallas Stars	34–22–10	T
67	March 9, 1994	7–2	St. Louis Blues	35–22–10	W
68	March 10, 1994	4–4	@ Quebec Nordiques	35–22–11	T
69	March 12, 1994	4–4	Philadelphia Flyers	35–22–12	T
70	March 14, 1994	5–4	Boston Bruins	36–22–12	W
71	March 16, 1994	5–3	Chicago Blackhawks	37–22–12	W
72	March 19, 1994	5–2	Quebec Nordiques	38–22–12	W
73	March 23, 1994	1–3	@ Winnipeg Jets	38–23–12	L
74	March 24, 1994	5–5	@ Chicago Blackhawks	38–23–13	T
75	March 26, 1994	3–6	@ Boston Bruins	38–24–13	L
76	March 28, 1994	3–2	Ottawa Senators	39–24–13	W
77	March 29, 1994	2–5	@ New Jersey Devils	39–25–13	L

April: 2–4–1 (home: 1–1–1; road: 1–3–0)

Game	Date	Score	Opponent	Record	Recap
78	April 1, 1994	2–5	@ New York Islanders	39–26–13	L
79	April 2, 1994	3–3	New York Islanders	39–26–14	T
80	April 6, 1994	1–3	Tampa Bay Lightning	39–27–14	L
81	April 8, 1994	0–1	@ Buffalo Sabres	39–28–14	L
82	April 9, 1994	9–1	Pittsburgh Penguins	40–28–14	W
83	April 11, 1994	3–1	@ Hartford Whalers	41–28–14	W
84	April 13, 1994	0–9	@ Detroit Red Wings	41–29–14	L

Legend: W Win (2 points) L Loss (0 points) T Tie (1 point)

=== Playoffs ===
1994 Stanley Cup playoffs
Eastern Conference Quarterfinals vs. (4) Boston Bruins – Bruins win 4–3

Game	Date	Score	Opponent	Series	Recap
1	April 16, 1994	2–3	@ Boston Bruins	Bruins lead 1–0	L
2	April 18, 1994	3–2	@ Boston Bruins	Series tied 1–1	W
3	April 21, 1994	3–6	Boston Bruins	Bruins lead 2–1	L
4	April 23, 1994	5–2	Boston Bruins	Series tied 2–2	W
5	April 25, 1994	2–1 OT	@ Boston Bruins	Canadiens lead 3–2	W
6	April 27, 1994	2–3	Boston Bruins	Series tied 3–3	L
7	April 29, 1994	3–5	@ Boston Bruins	Bruins win 4–3	L

Legend: W Win L Loss

== Player statistics ==
=== Regular season ===
Scoring

Player	Pos	GP	G	A	Pts	PIM	+/-	PPG	SHG	GWG
Vincent Damphousse	C	84	40	51	91	75	0	13	0	10
Brian Bellows	LW	77	33	38	71	36	9	13	0	2
Kirk Muller	LW	76	23	34	57	96	-1	9	2	3
Mathieu Schneider	D	75	20	32	52	62	15	11	0	4
Mike Keane	RW	80	16	30	46	119	6	6	2	2
Gilbert Dionne	LW	74	19	26	45	31	-9	3	0	5
John LeClair	LW	74	19	24	43	32	17	1	0	1
Lyle Odelein	D	79	11	29	40	276	8	6	0	2
Guy Carbonneau	C	79	14	24	38	48	16	0	0	1
Eric Desjardins	D	84	12	23	35	97	-1	6	1	3
Paul DiPietro	C	70	13	20	33	37	-2	2	0	0
Benoit Brunet	LW	71	10	20	30	20	14	0	3	1
Oleg Petrov	RW	55	12	15	27	2	7	1	0	1
Patrice Brisebois	D	53	2	21	23	63	5	1	0	0
Stephan Lebeau	C	34	9	7	16	8	1	4	0	2
Gary Leeman	RW	31	4	11	15	17	5	0	0	0
Ed Ronan	RW	61	6	8	14	42	3	0	0	1
J. J. Daigneault	D	68	2	12	14	73	16	0	0	1
Peter Popovic	D	47	2	12	14	26	10	1	0	0
Kevin Haller	D	68	4	9	13	118	3	0	0	1
Ron Wilson	C	48	2	10	12	12	-2	0	0	0
Pierre Sevigny	LW	43	4	5	9	42	6	1	0	1
Donald Brashear	LW	14	2	2	4	34	0	0	0	0
Bryan Fogarty	D	13	1	2	3	10	-4	0	0	0
Christian Proulx	D	7	1	2	3	20	0	0	0	0
Mario Roberge	LW	28	1	2	3	55	-2	0	0	0
Brian Savage	LW	3	1	0	1	0	0	0	0	0
Craig Ferguson	C	2	0	1	1	0	1	0	0	0
Rob Ramage	D	6	0	1	1	2	-1	0	0	0
Patrick Roy	G	68	0	1	1	30	0	0	0	0
Frederic Chabot	G	1	0	0	0	0	0	0	0	0
Gerry Fleming	LW	5	0	0	0	25	-4	0	0	0
Les Kuntar	G	6	0	0	0	2	0	0	0	0
Andre Racicot	G	11	0	0	0	0	0	0	0	0
Turner Stevenson	RW	2	0	0	0	2	-2	0	0	0
Ron Tugnutt	G	8	0	0	0	0	0	0	0	0
Lindsay Vallis	D	1	0	0	0	0	0	0	0	0

Goaltending

Player	MIN	GP	W	L	T	GA	GAA	SO	SA	SV	SV%
Patrick Roy	3867	68	35	17	11	161	2.50	7	1956	1795	.918
Les Kuntar	302	6	2	2	0	16	3.18	0	130	114	.877
Andre Racicot	500	11	2	6	2	37	4.44	0	246	209	.850
Ron Tugnutt	378	8	2	3	1	24	3.81	0	172	148	.860
Frederic Chabot	60	1	0	1	0	5	5.00	0	24	19	.792
Team:	5107	84	41	29	14	243	2.85	7	2528	2285	.904

=== Playoffs ===
Scoring

Player	Pos	GP	G	A	Pts	PIM	PPG	SHG	GWG
Kirk Muller	LW	7	6	2	8	4	3	0	2
Paul DiPietro	C	7	2	4	6	2	2	0	1
Benoit Brunet	LW	7	1	4	5	16	0	0	0
Mike Keane	RW	6	3	1	4	4	0	0	0
Guy Carbonneau	C	7	1	3	4	4	0	0	0
Patrice Brisebois	D	7	0	4	4	6	0	0	0
John LeClair	LW	7	2	1	3	8	1	0	0
Brian Bellows	LW	6	1	2	3	2	0	0	0
Vincent Damphousse	C	7	1	2	3	8	0	0	0
Gilbert Dionne	LW	5	1	2	3	0	0	0	0
Kevin Haller	D	7	1	1	2	19	0	0	0
Eric Desjardins	D	7	0	2	2	4	0	0	0
Brian Savage	LW	3	0	2	2	0	0	0	0
Turner Stevenson	RW	3	0	2	2	0	0	0	0
Ed Ronan	RW	7	1	0	1	0	0	0	0
J. J. Daigneault	D	7	0	1	1	12	0	0	0
Peter Popovic	D	6	0	1	1	0	0	0	0
Pierre Sevigny	LW	3	0	1	1	0	0	0	0
Donald Brashear	LW	2	0	0	0	0	0	0	0
Gary Leeman	RW	1	0	0	0	0	0	0	0
Lyle Odelein	D	7	0	0	0	17	0	0	0
Oleg Petrov	RW	2	0	0	0	0	0	0	0
Patrick Roy	G	6	0	0	0	0	0	0	0
Mathieu Schneider	D	1	0	0	0	0	0	0	0
Ron Tugnutt	G	1	0	0	0	0	0	0	0
Ron Wilson	C	4	0	0	0	0	0	0	0

Goaltending

Player	MIN	GP	W	L	GA	GAA	SO	SA	SV	SV%
Patrick Roy	375	6	3	3	16	2.56	0	228	212	.930
Ron Tugnutt	59	1	0	1	5	5.08	0	25	20	.800
Team:	434	7	3	4	21	2.90	0	253	232	.917

Note:

Pos = Position;GP = Games played; G = Goals; A = Assists; Pts = Points; PIM = Penalty minutes; +/- = Plus/minus; PPG = Power-play goals; SHG = Short-handed goals; GWG = Game-winning goals
Pos = Position;GP = Games played; Min, TOI = Minutes played; W = Wins; L = Losses; T,T/OT = Ties; OTL = Overtime losses; GA = Goals-against; GAA = Goals-against average; SO = Shutouts; SA = Shots against; SV = Shots saved;SV% = Save percentage;

== Transactions ==
February 20, 1994	To Montreal Canadiens Ron Tugnutt	To Anaheim Ducks Stephan Lebeau

== Draft picks ==
Montreal's draft picks at the 1993 NHL entry draft held at the Quebec Coliseum in Quebec City, Quebec.

Round	#	Player	Position	Nationality	College/Junior/Club team
1	21	Saku Koivu	Centre	Finland	TPS (Finland)
2	47	Rory Fitzpatrick	Defence	United States	Sudbury Wolves (OHL)
3	73	Sebastien Bordeleau	Centre	Canada	Hull Olympiques (QMJHL)
4	85	Adam Wiesel	Defence	United States	Springfield Olympics (NEJHL)
4	99	Jean-Francois Houle	Left wing	Canada	Northwood Prep. (USHS-NY)
5	113	Jeff Lank	Defence	Canada	Prince Albert Raiders (WHL)
5	125	Dion Darling	Defence	Canada	Spokane Chiefs (WHL)
6	151	Darcy Tucker	Right wing	Canada	Kamloops Blazers (WHL)
7	177	David Ruhly	Left wing	United States	Culver Military Academy (USHS-IN)
8	203	Alan Letang	Defence	Canada	Newmarket Royals (OHL)
9	229	Alexandre Duchesne	Left wing	Canada	Drummondville Voltigeurs (QMJHL)
10	255	Brian Larochelle	Goaltender	United States	Phillips Exeter Academy (USHS-NH)
11	281	Russell Guzior	Centre	United States	Culver Military Academy (USHS-IN)

== See also ==
- 1993–94 NHL season
