= Scott McKay (ice hockey) =

Canadian ice hockey player

- Born: January 26, 1972 (age 54) Burlington, Ontario, Canada
- Height: 5 ft 11 in (180 cm)
- Weight: 200 lb (91 kg; 14 st 4 lb)
- Position: Right wing
- Shot: Right
- Played for: Mighty Ducks of Anaheim
- NHL draft: Undrafted
- Playing career: 1993–1998

Scott Gordon McKay (born January 26, 1972) is a Canadian former professional ice hockey right winger who played National Hockey League for the Mighty Ducks of Anaheim during the 1993–94 NHL season. On April 9, 1994, he played against the Vancouver Canucks, he was credited with 1 shot on goal, but failed to register a point. After the game, he played in various minor leagues, as well as in the Alpenliga in 1996-1997. He retired in 1998.

== Career statistics ==
=== Regular season and playoffs ===
			Regular season					Playoffs
Season	Team	League	GP	G	A	Pts	PIM	GP	G	A	Pts	PIM
1988–89	Burlington Cougars	COJHL	25	19	25	44	40	—	—	—	—	—
1989–90	London Knights	OHL	59	20	29	49	37	5	1	1	2	12
1990–91	London Knights	OHL	62	29	40	69	29	7	4	2	6	6
1991–92	London Knights	OHL	64	30	45	75	97	10	3	8	11	8
1992–93	London Knights	OHL	63	38	57	95	49	12	1	14	15	6
1993–94	Mighty Ducks of Anaheim	NHL	1	0	0	0	0	—	—	—	—	—
1993–94	San Diego Gulls	IHL	58	10	6	16	35	9	2	5	7	6
1994–95	Greensboro Monarchs	ECHL	17	7	7	14	54	—	—	—	—	—
1994–95	San Diego Gulls	IHL	1	0	0	0	2	—	—	—	—	—
1995–96	Baltimore Bandits	AHL	16	1	0	1	6	—	—	—	—	—
1995–96	Raleigh IceCaps	ECHL	2	1	0	1	0	—	—	—	—	—
1996–97	EC Graz	ALP	17	6	7	13	16	—	—	—	—	—
1996–97	Port Huron Border Cats	CoHL	20	9	12	21	28	—	—	—	—	—
1996–97	Carolina Monarchs	AHL	30	1	9	10	2	—	—	—	—	—
1997–98	Louisiana IceGators	ECHL	48	20	16	36	55	9	2	3	5	4
NHL totals			1	0	0	0	0	—	—	—	—	—

== See also ==
- List of players who played only one game in the NHL
