= Yan Kaminsky =

Russian ice hockey player

- Born: July 28, 1971 (age 55) Penza, Soviet Union
- Height: 6 ft 1 in (185 cm)
- Weight: 176 lb (80 kg; 12 st 8 lb)
- Position: Right wing
- Shot: Left
- Played for: Dynamo Moscow; Fribourg-Gottéron; Winnipeg Jets; New York Islanders; Lukko
- National team: Soviet Union and Russia
- NHL draft: 99th overall, 1991; Winnipeg Jets
- Playing career: 1987–1999

Yan Bronislavovich Kaminsky (Russian: Ян Брониславович Каминский; born July 28, 1971) is a Russian former professional ice hockey player who played in the Soviet Championship League and National Hockey League (NHL) between 1989 and 1995. He played for Dynamo Moscow, Winnipeg Jets, and New York Islanders. He was inducted into the Russian and Soviet Hockey Hall of Fame in 1993. He currently resides in Kennesaw, Georgia where he serves as Youth Hockey Director for the Atlanta Madhatters hockey team.

== Career statistics ==
=== Regular season and playoffs ===
			Regular season					Playoffs
Season	Team	League	GP	G	A	Pts	PIM	GP	G	A	Pts	PIM
1987–88	Dizelist Penza	USSR-2	43	10	7	17	12	—	—	—	—	—
1988–89	Dizelist Penza	USSR-3	36	4	4	8	10	—	—	—	—	—
1989–90	Dynamo Moscow	USSR	6	1	0	1	4	—	—	—	—	—
1989–90	Dynamo Moscow-2	USSR-3	37	12	4	16	46	—	—	—	—	—
1990–91	Dynamo Moscow	USSR	25	10	5	15	2	—	—	—	—	—
1990–91	Dynamo Moscow-2	USSR-3	16	7	9	16	16	—	—	—	—	—
1991–92	Dynamo Moscow	USSR	35	8	7	15	22	7	1	0	1	0
1991–92	HC Fribourg-Gottéron	NLA	1	0	0	0	0	—	—	—	—	—
1992–93	Dynamo Moscow	RUS	39	15	14	29	12	10	2	5	7	8
1993–94	Winnipeg Jets	NHL	1	0	0	0	0	—	—	—	—	—
1993–94	Moncton Hawks	AHL	33	9	13	22	6	—	—	—	—	—
1993–94	New York Islanders	NHL	23	2	1	3	4	2	0	0	0	4
1994–95	New York Islanders	NHL	2	1	1	2	0	—	—	—	—	—
1994–95	Denver Grizzlies	IHL	38	17	16	33	14	15	6	6	12	0
1995–96	Utah Grizzlies	IHL	16	3	3	6	8	21	3	5	8	4
1996–97	Utah Grizzlies	IHL	77	28	27	55	18	7	1	4	5	0
1997–98	Lukko	FIN	38	5	8	13	33	—	—	—	—	—
1998–99	Utah Grizzlies	IHL	56	11	17	28	12	—	—	—	—	—
1998–99	Grand Rapids Griffins	IHL	7	0	2	2	0	—	—	—	—	—
IHL totals			194	59	65	124	52	43	10	15	25	4
NHL totals			26	3	2	5	4	2	0	0	0	4

=== International ===
Year	Team	Event	GP	G	A	Pts	PIM
1989	Soviet Union	EJC	6	2	2	4	6
1990	Soviet Union	WJC	7	2	0	2	0
1991	Soviet Union	WJC	6	1	1	2	6
1993	Russia	WC	8	2	2	4	4
Junior totals			13	3	1	4	6
Senior totals			8	2	2	4	4
