= 1993–94 New Jersey Devils season =

Ice hockey team season

1993–94 New Jersey Devils
- Division: 2nd Atlantic
- Conference: 3rd Eastern
- 1993–94 record: 47–25–12
- Home record: 29–11–2
- Road record: 18–14–10
- Goals for: 306
- Goals against: 220

Team information
- General manager: Lou Lamoriello
- Coach: Jacques Lemaire
- Captain: Scott Stevens
- Alternate captains: Bruce Driver; John MacLean
- Arena: Brendan Byrne Arena
- Minor league affiliates: Albany River Rats; Raleigh IceCaps

Team leaders
- Goals: John MacLean (37)
- Assists: Scott Stevens (60)
- Points: Scott Stevens (78)
- Penalty minutes: Randy McKay (224)
- Plus/minus: Scott Stevens (+53)
- Wins: Martin Brodeur (27)
- Goals against average: Martin Brodeur (2.40)

The 1993–94 New Jersey Devils season was the 20th season for the National Hockey League (NHL) franchise that was established on June 11, 1974, and 12th season since the franchise relocated from Colorado prior to the 1982–83 NHL season. For the fourth consecutive season, the Devils qualified for the playoffs. In the playoffs, the Devils made it all the way to the Eastern Conference Final where they came within a game of advancing to the 1994 Stanley Cup Final. Goaltender Martin Brodeur won the Calder Memorial Trophy as the NHL's top rookie and new coach Jacques Lemaire won the Jack Adams Award as the NHL's top coach.

== Regular season ==
The New Jersey Devils opened the 1993–94 season with 7 consecutive wins. They finished second in scoring and in goaltending. They also set team records in wins (47) and points (106). Captain Scott Stevens led the league in +/- with +53.

During the regular season, the Devils allowed the fewest even-strength goals (141) and had the fewest power-play opportunities (333).

=== Final standings ===
Atlantic Division
No.	CR		GP	W	L	T	GF	GA	Pts
1	1	**New York Rangers**	84	52	24	8	299	231	112
2	3	**New Jersey Devils**	84	47	25	12	306	220	106
3	7	**Washington Capitals**	84	39	35	10	277	263	88
4	8	**New York Islanders**	84	36	36	12	282	264	84
5	9	Florida Panthers	84	33	34	17	233	233	83
6	10	Philadelphia Flyers	84	35	39	10	294	314	80
7	12	Tampa Bay Lightning	84	30	43	11	224	251	71

Note: No. = Division rank, CR = Conference rank, W = Wins, L = Losses, T = Ties, GF = Goals For, GA = Goals Against, Pts = Points
Teams that qualified for the playoffs are highlighted in bold.

Eastern Conference
R		GP	W	L	T	GF	GA	Pts
**1**	**p-New York Rangers ***	**84**	**52**	**24**	**8**	**299**	**231**	**112**
**2**	**x-Pittsburgh Penguins ***	**84**	**44**	**27**	**13**	**299**	**285**	**101**
**3**	**New Jersey Devils**	**84**	**47**	**25**	**12**	**306**	**220**	**106**
**4**	**Boston Bruins**	**84**	**42**	**29**	**13**	**289**	**252**	**97**
**5**	**Montreal Canadiens**	**84**	**41**	**29**	**14**	**283**	**248**	**96**
**6**	**Buffalo Sabres**	**84**	**43**	**32**	**9**	**282**	**218**	**95**
**7**	**Washington Capitals**	**84**	**39**	**35**	**10**	**277**	**263**	**88**
**8**	**New York Islanders**	**84**	**36**	**36**	**12**	**282**	**264**	**84**
9	Florida Panthers	84	33	34	17	233	233	83
10	Philadelphia Flyers	84	35	39	10	294	314	80
11	Quebec Nordiques	84	34	42	8	277	292	76
12	Tampa Bay Lightning	84	30	43	11	224	251	71
13	Hartford Whalers	84	27	48	9	227	288	63
14	Ottawa Senators	84	14	61	9	201	397	37

Final standings

bold – Qualified for playoffs; x – Won division; p – Won Presidents' Trophy (and division); * – Division leader

== Schedule and results ==
=== Regular season ===
1993–94 regular season
October: 8–2–0 (home: 6–1–0; road: 2–1–0)

Game	Date	Score	Opponent	Record	Recap
1	October 6, 1993	2–1	Tampa Bay Lightning	1–0–0	W
2	October 8, 1993	6–3	@ Washington Capitals	2–0–0	W
3	October 9, 1993	6–4	Washington Capitals	3–0–0	W
4	October 12, 1993	7–4	Winnipeg Jets	4–0–0	W
5	October 16, 1993	6–3	@ New York Islanders	5–0–0	W
6	October 20, 1993	4–0	Mighty Ducks of Anaheim	6–0–0	W
7	October 23, 1993	2–1	Florida Panthers	7–0–0	W
8	October 26, 1993	0–2	Montreal Canadiens	7–1–0	L
9	October 30, 1993	5–3	Philadelphia Flyers	8–1–0	W
10	October 31, 1993	1–4	@ New York Rangers	8–2–0	L

November: 7–4–2 (home: 2–3–0; road: 5–1–2)

Game	Date	Score	Opponent	Record	Recap
11	November 3, 1993	2–3	@ Los Angeles Kings	8–3–0	L
12	November 5, 1993	6–3	@ Mighty Ducks of Anaheim	9–3–0	W
13	November 7, 1993	2–1	@ San Jose Sharks	10–3–0	W
14	November 10, 1993	5–3	New York Islanders	11–3–0	W
15	November 11, 1993	5–3	@ Philadelphia Flyers	12–3–0	W
16	November 13, 1993	2–4	San Jose Sharks	12–4–0	L
17	November 17, 1993	4–0	Buffalo Sabres	13–4–0	W
18	November 18, 1993	5–2	@ Ottawa Senators	14–4–0	W
19	November 20, 1993	3–4 OT	Detroit Red Wings	14–5–0	L
20	November 23, 1993	1–1 OT	@ Quebec Nordiques	14–5–1	T
21	November 24, 1993	5–3	@ Buffalo Sabres	15–5–1	W
22	November 26, 1993	6–6 OT	@ St. Louis Blues	15–5–2	T
23	November 30, 1993	1–3	New York Rangers	15–6–2	L

December: 6–6–2 (home: 4–2–1; road: 2–4–1)

Game	Date	Score	Opponent	Record	Recap
24	December 2, 1993	2–2 OT	@ Pittsburgh Penguins	15–6–3	T
25	December 4, 1993	2–2 OT	Chicago Blackhawks	15–6–4	T
26	December 5, 1993	1–2	@ New York Rangers	15–7–4	L
27	December 8, 1993	4–2	@ Montreal Canadiens	16–7–4	W
28	December 9, 1993	2–3	Quebec Nordiques	16–8–4	L
29	December 11, 1993	5–2	Edmonton Oilers	17–8–4	W
30	December 14, 1993	1–4	@ New York Islanders	17–9–4	L
31	December 15, 1993	4–5	Boston Bruins	17–10–4	L
32	December 18, 1993	6–2	@ Quebec Nordiques	18–10–4	W
33	December 19, 1993	4–2	Philadelphia Flyers	19–10–4	W
34	December 22, 1993	3–6	@ Hartford Whalers	19–11–4	L
35	December 23, 1993	3–2	Toronto Maple Leafs	20–11–4	W
36	December 26, 1993	3–8	@ New York Rangers	20–12–4	L
37	December 28, 1993	4–2	Hartford Whalers	21–12–4	W

January: 6–4–2 (home: 2–2–0; road: 4–2–2)

Game	Date	Score	Opponent	Record	Recap
38	January 1, 1994	7–1	@ Ottawa Senators	22–12–4	W
39	January 4, 1994	6–3	New York Islanders	23–12–4	W
40	January 7, 1994	4–1	Florida Panthers	24–12–4	W
41	January 9, 1994	0–4	Washington Capitals	24–13–4	L
42	January 12, 1994	2–3	@ Montreal Canadiens	24–14–4	L
43	January 14, 1994	5–2	@ Washington Capitals	25–14–4	W
44	January 15, 1994	3–5	Los Angeles Kings	25–15–4	L
45	January 19, 1994	4–0	@ Winnipeg Jets	26–15–4	W
46	January 24, 1994	6–2	@ Dallas Stars	27–15–4	W
47	January 26, 1994	3–3 OT	@ Edmonton Oilers	27–15–5	T
48	January 28, 1994	2–2 OT	@ Calgary Flames	27–15–6	T
49	January 29, 1994	3–6	@ Vancouver Canucks	27–16–6	L

February: 6–4–3 (home: 5–2–0; road: 1–2–3)

Game	Date	Score	Opponent	Record	Recap
50	February 2, 1994	2–3	Buffalo Sabres	27–17–6	L
51	February 4, 1994	5–2	Ottawa Senators	28–17–6	W
52	February 5, 1994	7–3	Pittsburgh Penguins	29–17–6	W
53	February 10, 1994	7–3	Vancouver Canucks	30–17–6	W
54	February 12, 1994	3–5	@ Boston Bruins	30–18–6	L
55	February 13, 1994	3–3 OT	@ Tampa Bay Lightning	30–18–7	T
56	February 17, 1994	1–2	@ Toronto Maple Leafs	30–19–7	L
57	February 19, 1994	5–4	Tampa Bay Lightning	31–19–7	W
58	February 20, 1994	1–1 OT	@ Chicago Blackhawks	31–19–8	T
59	February 23, 1994	7–2	@ Detroit Red Wings	32–19–8	W
60	February 24, 1994	1–3	New York Rangers	32–20–8	L
61	February 26, 1994	1–1 OT	@ Hartford Whalers	32–20–9	T
62	February 28, 1994	5–1	St. Louis Blues	33–20–9	W

March: 12–1–2 (home: 8–0–1; road: 4–1–1)

Game	Date	Score	Opponent	Record	Recap
63	March 2, 1994	3–2	@ Florida Panthers	34–20–9	W
64	March 3, 1994	5–4 OT	@ Tampa Bay Lightning	35–20–9	W
65	March 5, 1994	6–3	Calgary Flames	36–20–9	W
66	March 7, 1994	2–2 OT	Quebec Nordiques	36–20–10	T
67	March 10, 1994	4–0	Hartford Whalers	37–20–10	W
68	March 12, 1994	2–1	Boston Bruins	38–20–10	W
69	March 13, 1994	4–0	Dallas Stars	39–20–10	W
70	March 15, 1994	2–3	@ New York Islanders	39–21–10	L
71	March 17, 1994	6–1	@ Buffalo Sabres	40–21–10	W
72	March 19, 1994	8–6	@ Boston Bruins	41–21–10	W
73	March 21, 1994	3–3 OT	@ Florida Panthers	41–21–11	T
74	March 24, 1994	2–1	Tampa Bay Lightning	42–21–11	W
75	March 26, 1994	7–2	Philadelphia Flyers	43–21–11	W
76	March 27, 1994	5–2	Quebec Nordiques	44–21–11	W
77	March 29, 1994	5–2	Montreal Canadiens	45–21–11	W

April: 2–4–1 (home: 2–1–0; road: 0–3–1)

Game	Date	Score	Opponent	Record	Recap
78	April 1, 1994	1–2	@ Washington Capitals	45–22–11	L
79	April 2, 1994	2–4	New York Rangers	45–23–11	L
80	April 6, 1994	1–3	@ Pittsburgh Penguins	45–24–11	L
81	April 8, 1994	7–2	Pittsburgh Penguins	46–24–11	W
82	April 10, 1994	2–2 OT	@ Florida Panthers	46–24–12	T
83	April 12, 1994	2–4	@ Philadelphia Flyers	46–25–12	L
84	April 14, 1994	4–1	Ottawa Senators	47–25–12	W

Legend: W Win (2 points) L Loss (0 points) T Tie (1 point)

=== Playoffs ===
1994 Stanley Cup playoffs
Eastern Conference Quarterfinals vs. (6) Buffalo Sabres – Devils win 4–3

Game	Date	Score	Opponent	Series	Recap
1	April 17, 1994	0–2	Buffalo Sabres	Sabres lead 1–0	L
2	April 19, 1994	2–1	Buffalo Sabres	Series tied 1–1	W
3	April 21, 1994	2–1	@ Buffalo Sabres	Devils lead 2–1	W
4	April 23, 1994	3–5	@ Buffalo Sabres	Series tied 2–2	L
5	April 25, 1994	5–3	Buffalo Sabres	Devils lead 3–2	W
6	April 27, 1994	0–1 4OT	@ Buffalo Sabres	Series tied 3–3	L
7	April 29, 1994	2–1	Buffalo Sabres	Devils win 4–3	W

Eastern Conference Semifinals vs. (4) Boston Bruins – Devils win 4–2

Game	Date	Score	Opponent	Series	Recap
1	May 1, 1994	1–2	Boston Bruins	Bruins lead 1–0	L
2	May 3, 1994	5–6 OT	Boston Bruins	Bruins lead 2–0	L
3	May 5, 1994	4–2	@ Boston Bruins	Bruins lead 2–1	W
4	May 7, 1994	5–4 OT	@ Boston Bruins	Series tied 2–2	W
5	May 9, 1994	2–0	Boston Bruins	Devils win 3–2	W
6	May 11, 1994	5–3	@ Boston Bruins	Devils win 4–2	W

Eastern Conference Finals vs. (1) New York Rangers – Rangers win 4–3

Game	Date	Score	Opponent	Series	Recap
1	May 15, 1994	4–3 2OT	@ New York Rangers	Devils lead 1–0	W
2	May 17, 1994	0–4	@ New York Rangers	Series tied 1–1	L
3	May 19, 1994	2–3 2OT	New York Rangers	Rangers lead 2–1	L
4	May 21, 1994	3–1	New York Rangers	Series tied 2–2	W
5	May 23, 1994	4–1	@ New York Rangers	Devils lead 3–2	W
6	May 25, 1994	2–4	New York Rangers	Series tied 3–3	L
7	May 27, 1994	1–2 2OT	@ New York Rangers	Rangers win 4–3	L

Legend: W Win L Loss

== Player statistics ==
=== Regular season ===
Scoring

Player	Pos	GP	G	A	Pts	PIM	+/-	PPG	SHG	GWG
Scott Stevens	D	83	18	60	78	112	53	5	1	4
Stephane Richer	RW	80	36	36	72	16	31	7	3	9
John MacLean	RW	80	37	33	70	95	30	8	0	4
Valeri Zelepukin	LW	82	26	31	57	70	36	8	0	0
Corey Millen	C	78	20	30	50	52	24	4	0	3
Bernie Nicholls	C	61	19	27	46	86	24	3	0	1
Scott Niedermayer	D	81	10	36	46	42	34	5	0	2
Bill Guerin	RW	81	25	19	44	101	14	2	0	3
Claude Lemieux	RW	79	18	26	44	86	13	5	0	5
Tom Chorske	LW	76	21	20	41	32	14	1	1	4
Bobby Holík	C	70	13	20	33	72	28	2	0	3
Bob Carpenter	C	76	10	23	33	51	7	0	2	1
Bruce Driver	D	66	8	24	32	63	29	3	1	0
Alexander Semak	C	54	12	17	29	22	6	2	2	2
Randy McKay	RW	78	12	15	27	244	24	0	0	1
Mike Peluso	LW	69	4	16	20	238	19	0	0	0
Tommy Albelin	D	62	2	17	19	36	20	1	0	1
Jaroslav Modrý	D	41	2	15	17	18	10	2	0	0
Jim Dowd	C	15	5	10	15	0	8	2	0	0
Viacheslav Fetisov	D	52	1	14	15	30	14	0	0	0
David Emma	C	15	5	5	10	2	0	1	0	2
Ken Daneyko	D	78	1	9	10	176	27	0	0	1
Jason Smith	D	41	0	5	5	43	7	0	0	0
Chris Terreri	G	44	0	2	2	4	0	0	0	0
Ben Hankinson	RW	13	1	0	1	23	0	0	0	1
Martin Brodeur	G	47	0	0	0	2	0	0	0	0
Scott Pellerin	LW	1	0	0	0	2	0	0	0	0
Peter Sidorkiewicz	G	3	0	0	0	0	0	0	0	0

Goaltending

Player	MIN	GP	W	L	T	GA	GAA	SO	SA	SV	SV%
Martin Brodeur	2625	47	27	11	8	105	2.40	3	1238	1133	.915
Chris Terreri	2340	44	20	11	4	106	2.72	2	1141	1035	.907
Peter Sidorkiewicz	130	3	0	3	0	6	2.77	0	55	49	.891
Team:	5095	84	47	25	12	217	2.56	5	2434	2217	.911

=== Playoffs ===
Scoring

Player	Pos	GP	G	A	Pts	PIM	PPG	SHG	GWG
Claude Lemieux	RW	20	7	11	18	44	0	0	2
John MacLean	RW	20	6	10	16	22	2	0	1
Bernie Nicholls	C	16	4	9	13	28	2	1	0
Stephane Richer	RW	20	7	5	12	6	3	0	2
Scott Stevens	D	20	2	9	11	42	2	0	1
Bruce Driver	D	20	3	5	8	12	2	0	0
Jim Dowd	C	19	2	6	8	8	0	0	0
Bob Carpenter	C	20	1	7	8	20	0	0	0
Valeri Zelepukin	LW	20	5	2	7	14	1	0	0
Tom Chorske	LW	20	4	3	7	0	0	0	1
Tommy Albelin	D	20	2	5	7	14	1	0	1
Scott Niedermayer	D	20	2	2	4	8	1	0	0
Bill Guerin	RW	17	2	1	3	35	0	0	1
Randy McKay	RW	20	1	2	3	24	0	0	0
Bobby Holík	C	20	0	3	3	6	0	0	0
Viacheslav Fetisov	D	14	1	0	1	8	0	0	0
Ben Hankinson	RW	2	1	0	1	4	0	0	0
Corey Millen	C	7	1	0	1	2	0	0	1
Mike Peluso	LW	17	1	0	1	64	0	0	1
Martin Brodeur	G	17	0	1	1	0	0	0	0
Ken Daneyko	D	20	0	1	1	45	0	0	0
Alexander Semak	C	2	0	0	0	0	0	0	0
Jason Smith	D	6	0	0	0	7	0	0	0
Chris Terreri	G	4	0	0	0	4	0	0	0

Goaltending

Player	MIN	GP	W	L	GA	GAA	SO	SA	SV	SV%
Martin Brodeur	1171	17	8	9	38	1.95	1	531	493	.928
Chris Terreri	200	4	3	0	9	2.70	0	111	102	.919
Team:	1371	20	11	9	47	2.06	1	642	595	.927

Note: GP = Games played; G = Goals; A = Assists; Pts = Points; +/- = Plus/minus; PIM = Penalty minutes; PPG=Power-play goals; SHG=Short-handed goals; GWG=Game-winning goals
MIN=Minutes played; W = Wins; L = Losses; T = Ties; GA = Goals against; GAA = Goals against average; SO = Shutouts; SA=Shots against; SV=Shots saved; SV% = Save percentage;

== Awards and records ==
=== Awards ===
Regular Season
Player	Award	Awarded
Martin Brodeur	Calder Memorial Trophy	End of regular season
Martin Brodeur	NHL All-Rookie Team – Goaltender	End of regular season
Jacques Lemaire	Jack Adams Trophy	End of regular season
Scott Stevens	NHL Plus-Minus Award	End of regular season
Scott Stevens	NHL First All-Star Team – Defense	End of regular season

=== Nominations ===
Regular Season
Player	Award	Place
Scott Stevens	James Norris Memorial Trophy	Runner-Up

== Draft picks ==
New Jersey's draft picks at the 1993 NHL entry draft held at the Quebec Coliseum in Quebec City, Quebec.

Rd #	Pick #	Player	Nat	Pos	Team (League)	Notes
1	13	Denis Pederson	Canada	C	Prince Albert Raiders (WHL)	
2	32	Jay Pandolfo	United States	LW	Boston University (Hockey East)	(Note: The Devils acquired the 1993 second-round pick, Bobby Holik, and a conditional 1994 draft pick from Hartford for Sean Burke and Eric Weinrich on August 28, 1992.)
2	39	Brendan Morrison	Canada	C	Penticton Panthers (BCJHL)	
3	65	Krzysztof Oliwa	Poland	LW	Welland Flames (GHJBHL)	
4	91	No fourth-round pick				(Note: The Devils traded their 1993 fourth-round pick (used on Cosmo Dupual), along with Craig Billington and Troy Mallette to Ottawa for Peter Sidorkiewicz and future considerations (later became Mike Peluso) on June 20, 1993.)
5	110	John Guirestante	Canada	RW	London Knights (OHL)	(Note: The Devils acquired the 1993 fifth-round pick from Hartford for Lee Norwood on October 3, 1991. The Devils had traded their original fifth-round pick (used on Jason Saal) to Los Angeles for Corey Millen on June 26, 1993.)
6	143	Steve Brule	Canada	RW	St. Jean Lynx (QMJHL)	
7	169	Nikolai Zavarukhin	Russia	C	Salavat Yulaev Ufa (RSL)	
8	195	Thom Cullen	Canada	D	Wexford Raiders (MJHL)	
9	221	Judd Lambert	Canada	G	Chilliwack Chiefs (BCJHL)	
10	247	Jimmy Provencher	Canada	RW	St. Jean Lynx (QMJHL)	
11	273	Mike Legg	Canada	RW	London (MOJHL)	

== See also ==
- 1993–94 NHL season
