= 1993–94 Calgary Flames season =

NHL team season

1993–94 Calgary Flames
- Pacific Division champions
- Division: 1st Pacific
- Conference: 2nd Western
- 1993–94 record: 42–29–13
- Home record: 25–12–5
- Road record: 17–17–8
- Goals for: 302
- Goals against: 256

Team information
- General manager: Doug Risebrough
- Coach: Dave King
- Captain: Joe Nieuwendyk
- Alternate captains: Al MacInnis; Joel Otto
- Arena: Olympic Saddledome
- Average attendance: 19,325
- Minor league affiliate: Saint John Flames

Team leaders
- Goals: Gary Roberts (41)
- Assists: Al MacInnis (54)
- Points: Robert Reichel (93)
- Penalty minutes: Ron Stern (243)
- Plus/minus: Frank Musil (+38)
- Wins: Mike Vernon (26)
- Goals against average: Mike Vernon (2.81)

The 1993–94 Calgary Flames season was the 14th National Hockey League season in Calgary. It was a season of change across the NHL, as the league reorganized its divisions and playoff format. The Smythe Division was retired and the Flames joined the new Pacific Division of the Western Conference, as the NHL aligned itself with the other major sports leagues in naming divisions by geographical boundaries. The change angered fans, who preferred the traditional convention, which honoured the game's past builders.

Realignment also led to significant changes in the playoff format, as the top eight teams in each conference now qualified for the post-season, rather than the top four in each division. Under the new format, the top team in each division was guaranteed one of the top two seeds, and declared the divisional champion, as opposed to having to win two playoff rounds to capture the division title. Thus, the Flames became the first Pacific Division champions, and the second seed in the playoffs. They faced the second place Vancouver Canucks in the playoffs rather than the fourth place Mighty Ducks of Anaheim who failed to qualify under the new system.

The playoffs ended in another bitter disappointment, as the Flames blew a 3–1 series lead, losing the last three games in overtime to the Canucks, who would eventually go onto the Stanley Cup finals before bowing out to the New York Rangers.

Two Flames represented the Western Conference at the 1994 All-Star Game: Forward Joe Nieuwendyk and defenceman Al MacInnis.

For the second consecutive season, four Flames reached the 30-goal plateau. Three of them (Theoren Fleury, Robert Reichel and Gary Roberts) were also 40-goal scorers.

Prior to the season, Calgary lost two players in the 1993 NHL expansion draft, as the Florida Panthers selected defenceman Alexander Godynyuk 13th overall, and centre Brian Skrudland 32nd overall. The Mighty Ducks of Anaheim did not select any Flames players.

== Regular season ==
The Flames were shorthanded a total of 465 times during the regular season, the most among all 26 teams.

=== Season standings ===
Pacific Division
No.	CR		GP	W	L	T	GF	GA	Pts
1	3	**Calgary Flames**	84	42	29	13	302	256	97
2	7	**Vancouver Canucks**	84	41	40	3	279	276	85
3	8	**San Jose Sharks**	84	33	35	16	252	265	82
4	9	Mighty Ducks of Anaheim	84	33	46	5	229	251	71
5	10	Los Angeles Kings	84	27	45	12	294	322	66
6	11	Edmonton Oilers	84	25	45	14	261	305	64

Note: No. = Division rank, CR = Conference rank, W = Wins, L = Losses, T = Ties, GF = Goals For, GA = Goals Against, Pts = Points
Teams that qualified for the playoffs are highlighted in bold.

Western Conference
R		Div	GP	W	L	T	GF	GA	Pts
**1**	**y- Detroit Red Wings ***	**CEN**	**84**	**46**	**30**	**8**	**356**	**275**	**100**
**2**	**x- Calgary Flames ***	**PAC**	**84**	**42**	**29**	**13**	**302**	**256**	**97**
**3**	**Toronto Maple Leafs**	**CEN**	**84**	**43**	**29**	**12**	**280**	**243**	**98**
**4**	**Dallas Stars**	**CEN**	**84**	**42**	**29**	**13**	**286**	**265**	**97**
**5**	**St. Louis Blues**	**CEN**	**84**	**40**	**33**	**11**	**270**	**283**	**91**
**6**	**Chicago Blackhawks**	**CEN**	**84**	**39**	**36**	**9**	**254**	**240**	**87**
**7**	**Vancouver Canucks**	**PAC**	**84**	**41**	**40**	**3**	**279**	**276**	**85**
**8**	**San Jose Sharks**	**PAC**	**84**	**33**	**35**	**16**	**252**	**265**	**82**
9	Mighty Ducks of Anaheim	PAC	84	33	46	5	229	251	71
10	Los Angeles Kings	PAC	84	27	45	12	294	322	66
11	Edmonton Oilers	PAC	84	25	45	14	261	305	64
12	Winnipeg Jets	CEN	84	24	51	9	245	344	57

Divisions: CEN – Central, PAC – Pacific

bold – Qualified for playoffs; x – Won division; y – Won Conference (and division); * – Division leader

== Playoffs ==
The Flames entered the 1994 Stanley Cup playoffs as the second seed under the new alignment, facing the seventh seeded Vancouver Canucks. After getting blown out at home in game one, the Flames responded by winning the next three games to take a 3–1 series lead. The Flames, however, lost the last three games in overtime, as they proved unable to overcome a series of injuries to key players, and the tenacious play of the Canucks. Pavel Bure scored the series winner on a breakaway in double overtime for the Canucks, who reached the Stanley Cup finals before falling to the New York Rangers in seven games.

For the Flames, it was another year of playoff frustration, as for the fifth consecutive year, Calgary failed to reach the second round of the post-season.

== Schedule and results ==
=== Regular season ===
1993–94 regular season
October: 8–3–2 (home: 4–2–1; road: 4–1–1)

Game	Date	Visitor	Score	Home	OT	Record	Pts	Recap
1	October 5	NY Islanders	1 – 2	Calgary		1–0–0	2	W
2	October 7	San Jose	2 – 6	Calgary		2–0–0	4	W
3	October 9	Calgary	5 – 1	Vancouver		3–0–0	6	W
4	October 14	Calgary	2 – 1	San Jose		4–0–0	8	W
5	October 16	Calgary	4 – 8	Los Angeles		4–1–0	8	L
6	October 17	Calgary	2 – 2	Anaheim	OT	4–1–1	9	T
7	October 20	Calgary	5 – 3	Edmonton		5–1–1	11	W
8	October 21	Vancouver	6 – 3	Calgary		5–2–1	11	L
9	October 23	Boston	3 – 3	Calgary	OT	5–2–2	12	T
10	October 25	Washington	2 – 3	Calgary	OT	6–2–2	14	W
11	October 27	Buffalo	5 – 3	Calgary		6–3–2	14	L
12	October 30	Edmonton	1 – 4	Calgary		7–3–2	16	W
13	October 31	Calgary	4 – 3	Winnipeg		8–3–2	18	W

November: 7–4–2 (home: 5–2–1; road: 2–2–1)

Game	Date	Visitor	Score	Home	OT	Record	Pts	Recap
14	November 3	Calgary	6 – 3	Hartford		9–3–2	20	W
15	November 4	Calgary	3 – 6	Boston		9–4–2	20	L
16	November 6	Calgary	4 – 3	Montreal		10–4–2	22	W
17	November 9	Los Angeles	3 – 4	Calgary		11–4–2	24	W
18	November 11	Anaheim	4 – 5	Calgary		12–4–2	26	W
19	November 13	Vancouver	3 – 4	Calgary		13–4–2	28	W
20	November 15	Winnipeg	2 – 7	Calgary		14–4–2	30	W
21	November 18	Calgary	3 – 3	St. Louis	OT	14–4–3	31	T
22	November 20	Calgary	3 – 4	Dallas		14–5–3	31	L
23	November 22	Anaheim	2 – 1	Calgary		14–6–3	31	L
24	November 24	Toronto	3 – 5	Calgary		15–6–3	33	W
25	November 26	Chicago	6 – 3	Calgary		15–7–3	33	L
26	November 30	Dallas	2 – 2	Calgary	OT	15–7–4	34	T

December: 5–7–2 (home: 4–3–0; road: 1–4–2)

Game	Date	Visitor	Score	Home	OT	Record	Pts	Recap
27	December 4	Philadelphia	0 – 6	Calgary		16–7–4	36	W
28	December 6	Calgary	6 – 1	Ottawa		17–7–4	38	W
29	December 7	Calgary	4 – 4	Quebec	OT	17–7–5	39	T
30	December 10	Calgary	2 – 6	Buffalo		17–8–5	39	L
31	December 11	Calgary	1 – 3	Toronto		17–9–5	39	L
32	December 14	Vancouver	4 – 8	Calgary		18–9–5	41	W
33	December 17	St. Louis	4 – 3	Calgary		18–10–5	41	L
34	December 18	Winnipeg	4 – 5	Calgary	OT	19–10–5	43	W
35	December 20	Los Angeles	5 – 4	Calgary	OT	19–11–5	43	L
36	December 22	Calgary	3 – 7	Edmonton		19–12–5	43	L
37	December 23	Calgary	3 – 4	Vancouver		19–13–5	43	L
38	December 28	Calgary	3 – 3	San Jose	OT	19–13–6	44	T
39	December 30	Edmonton	1 – 7	Calgary		20–13–6	46	W
40	December 31	Montreal	5 – 2	Calgary		20–14–6	46	L

January: 4–5–3 (home: 2–2–2; road: 2–3–1)

Game	Date	Visitor	Score	Home	OT	Record	Pts	Recap
41	January 2	Calgary	3 – 4	St. Louis	OT	20–15–6	46	L
42	January 5	Calgary	4 – 1	NY Rangers		21–15–6	48	W
43	January 7	Calgary	2 – 6	NY Islanders		21–16–6	48	L
44	January 8	Calgary	2 – 2	Pittsburgh		21–16–7	49	T
45	January 11	Quebec	0 – 1	Calgary		22–16–7	51	W
46	January 15	Ottawa	0 – 10	Calgary		23–16–7	53	W
47	January 17	Calgary	2 – 3	San Jose		23–17–7	53	L
48	January 19	Calgary	4 – 3	Vancouver		24–17–7	55	W
49	January 24	Los Angeles	3 – 3	Calgary	OT	24–17–8	56	T
50	January 26	Dallas	3 – 2	Calgary		24–18–8	56	L
51	January 28	New Jersey	2 – 2	Calgary	OT	24–18–9	57	T
52	January 29	St. Louis	5 – 3	Calgary		24–19–9	57	L

February: 8–3–1 (home: 4–2–0; road: 4–1–1)

Game	Date	Visitor	Score	Home	OT	Record	Pts	Recap
53	February 2	Calgary	4 – 2	Anaheim		25–19–9	59	W
54	February 5	Calgary	5 – 4	Los Angeles	OT	26–19–9	61	W
55	February 7	Edmonton	3 – 4	Calgary		27–19–9	63	W
56	February 9	Calgary	1 – 6	Edmonton		28–19–9	65	W
57	February 11	Hartford	1 – 4	Calgary		29–19–9	67	W
58	February 12	Toronto	2 – 3	Calgary		30–19–9	69	W
59	February 14	Chicago	4 – 2	Calgary		30–20–9	69	L
60	February 18	Calgary	2 – 4	Dallas		30–21–9	69	L
61	February 20	Calgary	5 – 2	Winnipeg		31–21–9	71	W
62	February 22	Calgary	4 – 4	Vancouver	OT	31–21–10	72	T
63	February 24	Tampa Bay	4 – 0	Calgary		31–22–10	72	L
64	February 26	Los Angeles	2 – 4	Calgary		32–22–10	74	W

March: 6–5–2 (home: 3–1–1; road: 3–4–1)

Game	Date	Visitor	Score	Home	OT	Record	Pts	Recap
65	March 1	Calgary	2 – 5	Detroit		32–23–10	74	L
66	March 3	Calgary	2 – 4	Chicago		32–24–10	74	L
67	March 5	Calgary	3 – 6	New Jersey		32–25–10	74	L
68	March 6	Calgary	4 – 4	Washington	OT	32–25–11	75	T
69	March 9	Detroit	5 – 1	Calgary		32–26–11	75	L
70	March 11	Florida	2 – 4	Calgary		33–26–11	77	W
71	March 12	San Jose	0 – 2	Calgary		34–26–11	79	W
72	March 15	Calgary	7 – 3	Tampa Bay		35–26–11	81	W
73	March 16	Calgary	1 – 2	Florida		35–27–11	81	L
74	March 20	Calgary	6 – 3	Toronto		36–27–11	83	W
75	March 22	NY Rangers	4 – 4	Calgary		36–27–12	84	T
76	March 26	Pittsburgh	3 – 5	Calgary		37–27–12	86	W
77	March 31	Calgary	4 – 1	Philadelphia		38–27–12	88	W

April: 4–2–1 (home: 3–0–0; road: 1–2–1)

Game	Date	Visitor	Score	Home	OT	Record	Pts	Recap
78	April 2	Calgary	3 – 3	Detroit		38–27–13	89	T
79	April 3	Calgary	1 – 2	Chicago		38–28–13	89	L
80	April 6	Anaheim	2 – 4	Calgary		39–28–13	91	W
81	April 8	San Jose	2 – 5	Calgary		40–28–13	93	W
82	April 9	Detroit	2 – 4	Calgary		41–28–13	95	W
83	April 11	Calgary	3 – 0	Anaheim		42–28–13	97	W
84	April 13	Calgary	4 – 6	Los Angeles		42–29–13	97	L

Legend: W Win (2 points) L Loss (0 points) T Tie (1 point)

=== Playoffs ===
1994 Stanley Cup playoffs
Western Conference Quarterfinals vs. Vancouver Canucks (7) – Vancouver wins 4–3

Game	Date	Visitor	Score	Home	OT	Attendance	Series	Recap
1	April 18	Vancouver	5 – 0	Calgary		17,764	Vancouver leads 1–0	L
2	April 20	Vancouver	5 – 7	Calgary		18,318	Series tied 1–1	W
3	April 22	Calgary	4 – 2	Vancouver		16,150	Calgary leads 2–1	W
4	April 24	Calgary	3 – 2	Vancouver		16,150	Calgary leads 3–1	W
5	April 26	Vancouver	2 – 1	Calgary	OT	19,059	Calgary leads 3–2	L
6	April 28	Calgary	2 – 3	Vancouver	OT	16,150	Series tied 3–3	L
7	April 30	Vancouver	4 – 3	Calgary	2OT	20,230	Vancouver wins 4–3	L

Legend: W Win L Loss

== Player statistics ==
=== Skaters ===
Note: GP = Games played; G = Goals; A = Assists; Pts = Points; PIM = Penalty minutes

		Regular season					Playoffs
Player	#	GP	G	A	Pts	PIM	GP	G	A	Pts	PIM
Robert Reichel	26	84	40	53	93	58	7	0	5	5	0
Theoren Fleury	14	83	40	45	85	186	7	6	4	10	5
Gary Roberts	10	71	41	43	84	145	7	2	6	8	24
Al MacInnis	2	75	28	54	82	95	7	2	6	8	12
Joe Nieuwendyk	25	64	36	39	75	51	6	2	2	4	0
German Titov	13	76	27	18	45	28	7	2	1	3	4
Wes Walz	17	53	11	27	38	16	6	3	0	3	2
Kelly Kisio	11	51	7	23	30	28	7	0	2	2	8
Ron Stern	22	71	9	20	29	243	7	2	0	2	12
Paul Ranheim	28	67	10	14	24	20	-	-	-	-	-
Joel Otto	29	81	11	12	23	92	3	0	1	1	4
Michel Petit	7	63	2	21	23	110	-	-	-	-	-
Trent Yawney	18	58	6	15	21	60	7	0	0	0	16
Dan Keczmer^{†}	39	57	1	20	21	48	3	0	0	0	4
Gary Suter	20	25	4	9	13	20	-	-	-	-	-
Ted Drury	27	34	5	7	12	26	-	-	-	-	-
Chris Dahlquist	5	77	1	11	12	52	1	0	0	0	0
Paul Kruse	12	68	3	8	11	185	7	0	0	0	14
Michael Nylander^{†}	92	15	2	9	11	6	3	0	0	0	0
Sandy McCarthy	15	79	5	5	10	173	7	0	0	0	34
Zarley Zalapski^{†}	33	13	3	7	10	18	7	0	3	3	2
Frank Musil	3	75	1	8	9	10	7	1	1	2	8
Brad Schlegel	21	26	1	6	7	4	-	-	-	-	-
Mike Sullivan^{†}	32	19	2	3	5	6	7	1	1	2	8
James Patrick^{†}	6	15	2	2	4	6	7	0	1	1	6
Trevor Kidd	37	31	0	4	4	4	-	-	-	-	-
Vesa Viitakoski	32/19	8	1	2	3	0	-	-	-	-	-
Len Esau	36	6	0	3	3	7	-	-	-	-	-
Kevin Dahl	4	33	0	3	3	23	6	0	0	0	4
Greg Paslawski	23	15	2	0	2	2	-	-	-	-	-
David Haas	19	2	1	1	2	7	-	-	-	-	-
Guy Larose^{†}	42	7	0	1	1	4	-	-	-	-	-
Brad Miller	55/34	8	0	1	1	14	-	-	-	-	-
Lee Norwood	6	16	0	1	1	16	-	-	-	-	-
Jason Muzzatti	31	1	0	0	0	0	-	-	-	-	-
Jeff Reese	35	1	0	0	0	0	-	-	-	-	-
Mark Freer	16	2	0	0	0	4	-	-	-	-	-
Peter Ahola	38	2	0	0	0	0	-	-	-	-	-
David Struch	33	4	0	0	0	4	-	-	-	-	-
Kevin Wortman	34	5	0	0	0	2	-	-	-	-	-
Andrei Trefilov	1	11	0	0	0	4	-	-	-	-	-
Mike Vernon	30	48	0	0	0	14	7	0	0	0	2

^{†}Denotes player spent time with another team before joining Calgary. Stats reflect time with the Flames only.

=== Goaltenders ===
Note: GP = Games played; TOI = Time on ice (minutes); W = Wins; L = Losses; OT = Overtime/shootout losses; GA = Goals against; SO = Shutouts; GAA = Goals against average

		Regular season								Playoffs
Player	#	GP	TOI	W	L	T	GA	SO	GAA	GP	TOI	W	L	GA	SO	GAA
Andrei Trefilov	1	11	623	3	4	2	26	2	2.50	-	-	-	-	-	-	-
Mike Vernon	30	48	2798	26	17	5	131	3	2.81	7	466	3	4	23	0	2.96
Trevor Kidd	37	31	1614	13	7	6	85	0	3.16	-	-	-	-	-	-	-
Jeff Reese	35	1	13	0	0	0	1	0	4.62	-	-	-	-	-	-	-
Jason Muzzatti	36	1	60	0	1	0	8	0	8.00	-	-	-	-	-	-	-

^{†}Denotes player spent time with another team before joining Calgary. Stats reflect time with the Flames only.

== Transactions ==
The Flames were involved in the following transactions during the 1993–94 season.

=== Trades ===
Date	Details	
June 20, 1993	To Hartford Whalers Sergei Makarov	To Calgary Flames Future Considerations (1993 WSH 4th-round pick (#95 overall))
June 26, 1993	To Washington Capitals Craig Berube	To Calgary Flames 1993 5th-round pick (#121 overall)
June 26, 1993	To Washington Capitals 1993 7th-round pick (#174 overall)	To Calgary Flames Brad Schlegel
September 2, 1993	To Toronto Maple Leafs Todd Gillingham; Paul Holden	To Calgary Flames Jeff Perry; Brad Miller
October 5, 1993	To Tampa Bay Lightning Cash	To Calgary Flames Peter Ahola
November 19, 1993	To Hartford Whalers Jeff Reese	To Calgary Flames Dan Keczmer; Future Considerations
January 24, 1994	To Hartford Whalers Todd Harkins	To Calgary Flames Scott Morrow
March 10, 1994	To Hartford Whalers Gary Suter; Paul Ranheim; Ted Drury	To Calgary Flames Michael Nylander; James Patrick; Zarley Zalapski

=== Free agents ===
Date	Player	Team
August 3, 1993	Rich Chernomaz	to Toronto Maple Leafs
August 10, 1993	Dale Kushner	
August 10, 1993	David Haas	from Edmonton Oilers
August 10, 1993	Mark Freer	from Ottawa Senators
August 10, 1993	Mike Stevens	from New York Rangers
August 18, 1993	Kelly Kisio	
August 26, 1993	Wes Walz	from Philadelphia Flyers
September 6, 1993	Len Esau	from Quebec Nordiques
September 9, 1993	Chris Lindberg	to Quebec Nordiques
September 13, 1993	Wayne Cowley	to Edmonton Oilers
September 18, 1993	Kevan Guy	to New York Islanders
October 22, 1993	Lee Norwood	to St. Louis Blues
June 14, 1994	Neil Eisenhut	
June 14, 1994	Michel Petit	to Los Angeles Kings

=== Signings ===
Date	Player	Contract term
September 22, 1993	Gary Roberts	multi-year

=== Waivers ===
Date	Player	Team
January 1, 1994	Guy Larose	from Toronto Maple Leafs
January 6, 1994	Mike Sullivan	from San Jose Sharks

== Draft picks ==
Calgary's picks at the 1993 NHL entry draft, held in Quebec City, Quebec.

Rnd	Pick	Player	Nationality	Position	Team (league)	NHL statistics				
Rnd	Pick	Player	Nationality	Position	Team (league)	GP	G	A	Pts	PIM
1	18	Jesper Mattsson	Sweden	RW	Malmö Redhawks (SEL)					
2	44	Jamie Allison	Canada	D	Detroit Jr. Red Wings (OHL)	372	7	23	30	639
3	70	Dan Tompkins	United States	F	Omaha Lancers (USHL)					
4	95	Jason Smith	Canada	D	Princeton (NCAA)					
4	96	Marty Murray	Canada	C	Brandon Wheat Kings (WHL)	261	31	42	73	41
5	121	Darryl LaFrance	Canada	RW	Oshawa Generals (OHL)					
5	122	John Emmons	United States	C	Yale University (NCAA)	85	2	4	6	64
6	148	Andreas Karlsson	Sweden	C	Leksands IF (SEL)	264	16	35	51	72
8	200	Derek Sylvester	United States	RW	Niagara Falls Thunder (OHL)					
10	252	German Titov	Russia	C	Voskresensk Khimik (RSL)	624	157	220	377	311
11	278	Burke Murphy	Canada	RW	St. Lawrence University (NCAA)					

== Farm teams ==
=== Saint John Flames ===
The 1993–94 American Hockey League season was the first for the Flames top minor league affiliate as the new expansion team was created in Saint John, New Brunswick. The Flames posted a respectable 37–33–10 record in their first season, good enough for second in the Atlantic division. They fell to the Moncton Hawks in seven games in the first round of the playoffs, however. Cory Stillman led the Flames with 35 goals, while Mark Freer lead with 86 points. Jason Muzzatti was the starting goaltender, posting a 26–23–3 record with a 3.74 GAA in 51 games.

== See also ==
- 1993–94 NHL season
