= 1993–94 Toronto Maple Leafs season =

NHL hockey team season

1993–94 Toronto Maple Leafs
- Division: 2nd Central
- Conference: 3rd Western
- 1993–94 record: 43–29–12
- Home record: 23–15–4
- Road record: 20–14–8
- Goals for: 280
- Goals against: 243

Team information
- General manager: Cliff Fletcher
- Coach: Pat Burns
- Captain: Wendel Clark
- Alternate captains: Doug Gilmour; Bob Rouse
- Arena: Maple Leaf Gardens
- Minor league affiliate: St. John's Maple Leafs

Team leaders
- Goals: Dave Andreychuk (53)
- Assists: Doug Gilmour (84)
- Points: Doug Gilmour (111)
- Penalty minutes: Ken Baumgartner (185)
- Plus/minus: Sylvain Lefebvre (+33)
- Wins: Felix Potvin (34)
- Goals against average: Damian Rhodes (2.62)

The 1993–94 Toronto Maple Leafs season was the 77th season of play for the Maple Leafs in the National Hockey League (NHL). The Leafs opened the regular season with ten consecutive wins, and finished in second place in the Central Division with a record of 43 wins, 29 losses and 12 ties for 98 points. The team qualified for the playoffs for the second consecutive year, returning to the Conference Finals. They defeated the Chicago Blackhawks in six games in the Conference Quarterfinals, then eliminated the San Jose Sharks in a seven-game Conference Semifinal series. However, they lost the Western Conference Finals in five games to the Vancouver Canucks.

== Off-season ==
The NHL re-organized in the off-season, and the Leafs were placed in the new Central Division.

== Preseason ==
The Leafs played a pair of preseason games at Wembley Arena in London versus the New York Rangers on September 12 and 13, 1993. The Leafs lost both games and the prize money of $50,000.

Date	Venue	Team	Team	Score
September 11	Wembley Arena, London	Toronto Maple Leafs	New York Rangers	3–5
September 12	Wembley Arena, London	New York Rangers	Toronto Maple Leafs	3–1

== Regular season ==
The Leafs started the season with a ten-game winning streak, an NHL record they currently share with the 2006–07 Buffalo Sabres.

Doug Gilmour ranked fourth in the NHL in scoring with 111 points.

During the regular season, the Maple Leafs had the most power-play opportunities (459) out of all 26 teams.

=== Season standings ===
Central Division
No.	CR		GP	W	L	T	GF	GA	Pts
1	1	**Detroit Red Wings**	84	46	30	8	356	275	100
2	2	**Toronto Maple Leafs**	84	43	29	12	280	243	98
3	4	**Dallas Stars**	84	42	29	13	286	265	97
4	5	**St. Louis Blues**	84	40	33	11	270	283	91
5	6	**Chicago Blackhawks**	84	39	36	9	254	240	87
6	12	Winnipeg Jets	84	24	51	9	245	344	57

Note: No. = Division rank, CR = Conference rank, W = Wins, L = Losses, T = Ties, GF = Goals For, GA = Goals Against, Pts = Points
Teams that qualified for the playoffs are highlighted in bold.

Western Conference
R		Div	GP	W	L	T	GF	GA	Pts
**1**	**y- Detroit Red Wings ***	**CEN**	**84**	**46**	**30**	**8**	**356**	**275**	**100**
**2**	**x- Calgary Flames ***	**PAC**	**84**	**42**	**29**	**13**	**302**	**256**	**97**
**3**	**Toronto Maple Leafs**	**CEN**	**84**	**43**	**29**	**12**	**280**	**243**	**98**
**4**	**Dallas Stars**	**CEN**	**84**	**42**	**29**	**13**	**286**	**265**	**97**
**5**	**St. Louis Blues**	**CEN**	**84**	**40**	**33**	**11**	**270**	**283**	**91**
**6**	**Chicago Blackhawks**	**CEN**	**84**	**39**	**36**	**9**	**254**	**240**	**87**
**7**	**Vancouver Canucks**	**PAC**	**84**	**41**	**40**	**3**	**279**	**276**	**85**
**8**	**San Jose Sharks**	**PAC**	**84**	**33**	**35**	**16**	**252**	**265**	**82**
9	Mighty Ducks of Anaheim	PAC	84	33	46	5	229	251	71
10	Los Angeles Kings	PAC	84	27	45	12	294	322	66
11	Edmonton Oilers	PAC	84	25	45	14	261	305	64
12	Winnipeg Jets	CEN	84	24	51	9	245	344	57

Divisions: CEN – Central, PAC – Pacific

bold – Qualified for playoffs; x – Won division; y – Won Conference (and division); * – Division leader

== Playoffs ==
The Maple Leafs entered the playoffs as the third seed in the Western Conference beginning their playoff run against number six Chicago Blackhawks. After defeating Chicago, the Leafs would go on to play the eighth seed San Jose Sharks in the conference semifinals. With the win in game seven against San Jose, Toronto would go on to play the Vancouver Canucks, who would end their playoff run.

== Schedule and results ==
=== Regular season ===
1993–94 regular season
October: 10–1–0 (home: 5–0–0; road: 5–1–0)

Game	Date	Score	Opponent	Record	Recap
1	October 7, 1993	6–3	Dallas Stars (1993–94)	1–0–0	W
2	October 9, 1993	2–1	Chicago Blackhawks (1993–94)	2–0–0	W
3	October 10, 1993	5–4	@ Philadelphia Flyers (1993–94)	3–0–0	W
4	October 13, 1993	7–1	Washington Capitals (1993–94)	4–0–0	W
5	October 15, 1993	6–3	Detroit Red Wings (1993–94)	5–0–0	W
6	October 16, 1993	2–1	@ Detroit Red Wings (1993–94)	6–0–0	W
7	October 19, 1993	7–2	Hartford Whalers (1993–94)	7–0–0	W
8	October 21, 1993	4–3 OT	@ Florida Panthers (1993–94)	8–0–0	W
9	October 23, 1993	2–0	@ Tampa Bay Lightning (1993–94)	9–0–0	W
10	October 28, 1993	4–2	@ Chicago Blackhawks (1993–94)	10–0–0	W
11	October 30, 1993	2–5	@ Montreal Canadiens (1993–94)	10–1–0	L

November: 7–4–4 (home: 3–2–1; road: 4–2–3)

Game	Date	Score	Opponent	Record	Recap
12	November 1, 1993	3–3 OT	@ Dallas Stars (1993–94)	10–1–1	T
13	November 3, 1993	6–3	Florida Panthers (1993–94)	11–1–1	W
14	November 4, 1993	3–3 OT	@ Detroit Red Wings (1993–94)	11–1–2	T
15	November 6, 1993	5–3	Philadelphia Flyers (1993–94)	12–1–2	W
16	November 9, 1993	2–2 OT	@ San Jose Sharks (1993–94)	12–1–3	T
17	November 11, 1993	2–3	@ St. Louis Blues (1993–94)	12–2–3	L
18	November 13, 1993	2–3	Chicago Blackhawks (1993–94)	12–3–3	L
19	November 15, 1993	5–5 OT	Edmonton Oilers (1993–94)	12–3–4	T
20	November 17, 1993	4–3	@ Mighty Ducks of Anaheim (1993–94)	13–3–4	W
21	November 18, 1993	3–2	@ Los Angeles Kings (1993–94)	14–3–4	W
22	November 20, 1993	3–2	@ Edmonton Oilers (1993–94)	15–3–4	W
23	November 22, 1993	5–2	@ Vancouver Canucks (1993–94)	16–3–4	W
24	November 24, 1993	3–5	@ Calgary Flames (1993–94)	16–4–4	L
25	November 27, 1993	4–2	Boston Bruins (1993–94)	17–4–4	W
26	November 29, 1993	0–3	Buffalo Sabres (1993–94)	17–5–4	L

December: 4–7–2 (home: 3–3–1; road: 1–4–1)

Game	Date	Score	Opponent	Record	Recap
27	December 1, 1993	4–2	St. Louis Blues (1993–94)	18–5–4	W
28	December 2, 1993	5–4	@ St. Louis Blues (1993–94)	19–5–4	W
29	December 4, 1993	3–4	New York Rangers (1993–94)	19–6–4	L
30	December 8, 1993	4–5	Winnipeg Jets (1993–94)	19–7–4	L
31	December 11, 1993	3–1	Calgary Flames (1993–94)	20–7–4	W
32	December 12, 1993	3–3 OT	@ Winnipeg Jets (1993–94)	20–7–5	T
33	December 15, 1993	0–1	Mighty Ducks of Anaheim (1993–94)	20–8–5	L
34	December 17, 1993	2–6	@ New York Islanders (1993–94)	20–9–5	L
35	December 18, 1993	4–1	Los Angeles Kings (1993–94)	21–9–5	W
36	December 22, 1993	2–2 OT	San Jose Sharks (1993–94)	21–9–6	T
37	December 23, 1993	2–3	@ New Jersey Devils (1993–94)	21–10–6	L
38	December 27, 1993	2–5	@ Chicago Blackhawks (1993–94)	21–11–6	L
39	December 29, 1993	0–4	@ Dallas Stars (1993–94)	21–12–6	L

January: 7–2–4 (home: 4–2–2; road: 3–0–2)

Game	Date	Score	Opponent	Record	Recap
40	January 1, 1994	4–7	Los Angeles Kings (1993–94)	21–13–6	L
41	January 2, 1994	3–3 OT	@ Buffalo Sabres (1993–94)	21–13–7	T
42^{[a]}	January 4, 1994	0–1	Tampa Bay Lightning (1993–94)	21–14–7	L
43	January 6, 1994	6–3	Ottawa Senators (1993–94)	22–14–7	W
44	January 8, 1994	5–3	Vancouver Canucks (1993–94)	23–14–7	W
45	January 10, 1994	3–0	@ Boston Bruins (1993–94)	24–14–7	W
46	January 11, 1994	2–1	@ Washington Capitals (1993–94)	25–14–7	W
47	January 13, 1994	4–3 OT	Dallas Stars (1993–94)	26–14–7	W
48	January 15, 1994	5–1	@ Winnipeg Jets (1993–94)	27–14–7	W
49	January 18, 1994	3–3 OT	Mighty Ducks of Anaheim (1993–94)	27–14–8	T
50	January 19, 1994	3–3 OT	@ Hartford Whalers (1993–94)	27–14–9	T
51	January 26, 1994	4–3	New York Islanders (1993–94)	28–14–9	W
52	January 29, 1994	4–4 OT	Pittsburgh Penguins (1993–94)	28–14–10	T

February: 6–5–1 (home: 3–3–0; road: 3–2–1)

Game	Date	Score	Opponent	Record	Recap
53	February 1, 1994	4–4 OT	@ St. Louis Blues (1993–94)	28–14–11	T
54	February 5, 1994	3–4	Detroit Red Wings (1993–94)	28–15–11	L
55	February 7, 1994	1–2	Tampa Bay Lightning (1993–94)	28–16–11	L
56	February 11, 1994	3–1	@ Winnipeg Jets (1993–94)	29–16–11	W
57	February 12, 1994	2–3	@ Calgary Flames (1993–94)	29–17–11	L
58	February 15, 1994	5–4 OT	Detroit Red Wings (1993–94)	30–17–11	W
59	February 17, 1994	2–1	New Jersey Devils (1993–94)	31–17–11	W
60	February 19, 1994	3–2	Edmonton Oilers (1993–94)	32–17–11	W
61	February 21, 1994	6–4	@ Los Angeles Kings (1993–94)	33–17–11	W
62	February 23, 1994	3–6	@ Edmonton Oilers (1993–94)	33–18–11	L
63	February 26, 1994	0–3	Montreal Canadiens (1993–94)	33–19–11	L
64	February 28, 1994	4–1	@ Ottawa Senators (1993–94)	34–19–11	W

March: 6–7–1 (home: 4–4–0; road: 2–3–1)

Game	Date	Score	Opponent	Record	Recap
65	March 4, 1994	6–5 OT	@ Detroit Red Wings (1993–94)	35–19–11	W
66	March 5, 1994	1–4	@ Quebec Nordiques (1993–94)	35–20–11	L
67	March 7, 1994	2–3	St. Louis Blues (1993–94)	35–21–11	L
68	March 9, 1994	4–2	Dallas Stars (1993–94)	36–21–11	W
69	March 10, 1994	4–2	@ Pittsburgh Penguins (1993–94)	37–21–11	W
70	March 12, 1994	3–1	Winnipeg Jets (1993–94)	38–21–11	W
71	March 16, 1994	1–4	Vancouver Canucks (1993–94)	38–22–11	L
72	March 18, 1994	4–2	St. Louis Blues (1993–94)	39–22–11	W
73	March 20, 1994	3–6	Calgary Flames (1993–94)	39–23–11	L
74^{[a]}	March 23, 1994	1–1 OT	@ Florida Panthers (1993–94)	39–23–12	T
75	March 24, 1994	1–2	San Jose Sharks (1993–94)	39–24–12	L
76	March 26, 1994	6–3	Quebec Nordiques (1993–94)	40–24–12	W
77	March 28, 1994	2–3 OT	@ Vancouver Canucks (1993–94)	40–25–12	L
78	March 31, 1994	3–5	@ San Jose Sharks (1993–94)	40–26–12	L

April: 3–3–0 (home: 1–1–0; road: 2–2–0)

Game	Date	Score	Opponent	Record	Recap
79	April 2, 1994	1–3	@ Mighty Ducks of Anaheim (1993–94)	40–27–12	L
80	April 5, 1994	6–4	@ Dallas Stars (1993–94)	41–27–12	W
81	April 8, 1994	3–5	@ New York Rangers (1993–94)	41–28–12	L
82	April 10, 1994	7–0	Winnipeg Jets (1993–94)	42–28–12	W
83	April 12, 1994	3–4	Chicago Blackhawks (1993–94)	42–29–12	L
84	April 14, 1994	6–4	@ Chicago Blackhawks (1993–94)	43–29–12	W

Legend: W Win (2 points) L Loss (0 points) T Tie (1 point)
Notes: ^{a} Neutral site game played at Copps Coliseum in Hamilton, Ontario.

=== Playoffs ===
1994 Stanley Cup playoffs
Western Conference Quarterfinals vs. (6) Chicago Blackhawks – Maple Leafs win 4–2

Game	Date	Score	Opponent	Series	Recap
1	April 18, 1994	5–1	Chicago Blackhawks	Maple Leafs lead 1–0	W
2	April 20, 1994	1–0 OT	Chicago Blackhawks	Maple Leafs lead 2–0	W
3	April 23, 1994	4–5	@ Chicago Blackhawks	Maple Leafs lead 2–1	L
4	April 24, 1994	3–4 OT	@ Chicago Blackhawks	Series tied 2–2	L
5	April 26, 1994	1–0	Chicago Blackhawks	Maple Leafs lead 3–2	W
6	April 28, 1994	1–0	@ Chicago Blackhawks	Maple Leafs win 4–2	W

Western Conference Semifinals vs. (8) San Jose Sharks: Maple Leafs win 4–3

Game	Date	Score	Opponent	Series	Recap
1	May 2, 1994	2–3	San Jose Sharks	Sharks lead 1–0	L
2	May 4, 1994	5–1	San Jose Sharks	Series tied 1–1	W
3	May 6, 1994	2–5	@ San Jose Sharks	Sharks lead 2–1	L
4	May 8, 1994	8–3	@ San Jose Sharks	Series tied 2–2	W
5	May 10, 1994	2–5	@ San Jose Sharks	Sharks lead 3–2	L
6	May 12, 1994	3–2 OT	San Jose Sharks	Series tied 3–3	W
7	May 14, 1994	4–2	San Jose Sharks	Maple Leafs win 4–3	W

Western Conference Finals vs. (7) Vancouver Canucks: Canucks win 4–1

Game	Date	Score	Opponent	Series	Recap
1	May 16, 1994	3–2 OT	Vancouver Canucks	Maple Leafs lead 1–0	W
2	May 18, 1994	3–4	Vancouver Canucks	Series tied 1–1	L
3	May 20, 1994	0–4	@ Vancouver Canucks	Canucks lead 2–1	L
4	May 22, 1994	0–2	@ Vancouver Canucks	Canucks lead 3–1	L
5	May 24, 1994	3–4 2OT	@ Vancouver Canucks	Canucks win 4–1	L

Legend: W Win L Loss

== Player statistics ==
=== Regular season ===
Scoring

Player	GP	G	A	Pts	PIM	+/-	PPG	SHG	GWG
Doug Gilmour	83	27	84	111	105	25	10	1	3
Dave Andreychuk	83	53	46	99	98	22	21	5	8
Wendel Clark	64	46	30	76	115	10	21	0	8
Dave Ellett	68	7	36	43	42	6	5	0	1
Dmitri Mironov	76	9	27	36	78	5	3	0	0
Glenn Anderson	73	17	18	35	50	-6	5	0	3
Nikolai Borschevsky	45	14	20	34	10	6	7	0	1
John Cullen	53	13	17	30	67	-2	2	0	4
Rob Pearson	67	12	18	30	189	-6	1	0	4
Jamie Macoun	82	3	27	30	115	-5	1	0	1
Todd Gill	45	4	24	28	44	8	2	0	1
Mark Osborne	73	9	15	24	145	2	1	1	2
Bill Berg	83	8	11	19	93	-3	0	0	1
Mike Eastwood	54	8	10	18	28	2	1	0	2
Peter Zezel	41	8	8	16	19	5	0	0	0
Kent Manderville	67	7	9	16	63	5	0	0	1
Bob Rouse	63	5	11	16	101	8	1	1	0
Mike Gartner	10	6	6	12	4	9	1	0	0
Mike Krushelnyski	54	5	6	11	28	-5	1	0	1
Sylvain Lefebvre	84	2	9	11	79	33	0	0	0
Drake Berehowsky	49	2	8	10	63	-3	2	0	2
Ken Baumgartner	64	4	4	8	185	-6	0	0	0
Yanic Perreault	13	3	3	6	0	1	2	0	0
Chris Govedaris	12	2	2	4	14	4	0	0	0
Mark Greig	13	2	2	4	10	1	0	0	0
Felix Potvin	66	0	4	4	4	0	0	0	0
Guy Larose	10	1	2	3	10	-2	0	0	0
Ken McRae	9	1	1	2	36	1	0	0	0
David Sacco	4	1	1	2	4	-2	1	0	0
Alexei Kudashov	25	1	0	1	4	-3	0	0	0
Matt Martin	12	0	1	1	6	0	0	0	0
Greg Smyth	11	0	1	1	38	-2	0	0	0
Patrik Augusta	2	0	0	0	0	0	0	0	0
Frank Bialowas	3	0	0	0	12	0	0	0	0
Mike Foligno	4	0	0	0	4	0	0	0	0
David Harlock	6	0	0	0	0	-2	0	0	0
Eric Lacroix	3	0	0	0	2	0	0	0	0
Damian Rhodes	22	0	0	0	2	0	0	0	0
Chris Snell	2	0	0	0	2	-1	0	0	0

Goaltending

Player	MIN	GP	W	L	T	GA	GAA	SO	SA	SV	SV%
Felix Potvin	3883	66	34	22	9	187	2.89	3	2010	1823	.907
Damian Rhodes	1213	22	9	7	3	53	2.62	0	541	488	.902
Team:	5096	84	43	29	12	240	2.83	3	2551	2311	.906

=== Playoffs ===
Scoring

Player	GP	G	A	Pts	PIM	PPG	SHG	GWG
Doug Gilmour	18	6	22	28	42	5	0	1
Dave Ellett	18	3	15	18	31	3	0	0
Wendel Clark	18	9	7	16	24	2	0	1
Dmitri Mironov	18	6	9	15	6	6	0	0
Mike Gartner	18	5	6	11	14	1	0	3
Dave Andreychuk	18	5	5	10	16	3	1	0
Mark Osborne	18	4	2	6	52	0	2	1
Peter Zezel	18	2	4	6	8	0	0	1
Todd Gill	18	1	5	6	37	0	0	1
Mike Eastwood	18	3	2	5	12	1	0	1
Nikolai Borschevsky	15	2	2	4	4	1	0	0
Bill Berg	18	1	2	3	10	0	0	0
Sylvain Lefebvre	18	0	3	3	16	0	0	0
Bob Rouse	18	0	3	3	29	0	0	0
Jamie Macoun	18	1	1	2	12	0	0	0
Kent Manderville	12	1	0	1	4	0	1	0
Rob Pearson	14	1	0	1	32	0	0	0
Ken Baumgartner	10	0	0	0	18	0	0	0
John Cullen	3	0	0	0	0	0	0	0
Chris Govedaris	2	0	0	0	0	0	0	0
Darby Hendrickson	2	0	0	0	0	0	0	0
Mike Krushelnyski	6	0	0	0	0	0	0	0
Eric Lacroix	2	0	0	0	0	0	0	0
Ken McRae	6	0	0	0	4	0	0	0
Felix Potvin	18	0	0	0	4	0	0	0
Damian Rhodes	1	0	0	0	0	0	0	0

Goaltending

Player	MIN	GP	W	L	GA	GAA	SO	SA	SV	SV%
Felix Potvin	1124	18	9	9	46	2.46	3	520	474	.912
Damian Rhodes	1	1	0	0	0	0.00	0	0	0	
Team:	1125	18	9	9	46	2.45	3	520	474	.912

Note:

Pos = Position;GP = Games played; G = Goals; A = Assists; Pts = Points; PIM = Penalty minutes; +/- = Plus/minus; PPG = Power-play goals; SHG = Short-handed goals; GWG = Game-winning goals
Pos = Position;GP = Games played; Min, TOI = Minutes played; W = Wins; L = Losses; T,T/OT = Ties; OTL = Overtime losses; GA = Goals-against; GAA = Goals-against average; SO = Shutouts; SA = Shots against; SV = Shots saved;SV% = Save percentage;

== Awards and records ==
- Doug Gilmour, runner-up, Selke Trophy.
- Doug Gilmour, Molson Cup (most game star selections for Toronto Maple Leafs).

== Transactions ==
The Maple Leafs have been involved in the following transactions during the 1993-94 season.

=== Trades ===
August 3, 1993	To Florida Panthers Dave Tomlinson	To Toronto Maple Leafs Cash
August 12, 1993	To Winnipeg Jets Kevin McClelland	To Toronto Maple Leafs Cash
August 25, 1993	To Winnipeg Jets Future Considerations	To Toronto Maple Leafs Daniel Jardemyr
September 2, 1993	To Calgary Flames Jeff Perry; Brad Miller	To Toronto Maple Leafs Todd Gillingham; Paul Holden
November 5, 1993	To Florida Panthers Mike Foligno	To Toronto Maple Leafs Cash
December 7, 1993	To Florida Panthers Cash	To Toronto Maple Leafs Greg Smyth
January 25, 1994	To Hartford Whalers Ted Crowley	To Toronto Maple Leafs Mark Greig; 6th round pick in 1995 – Doug Bonner
February 21, 1994	To Tampa Bay Lightning Cash	To Toronto Maple Leafs Pat Jablonski
March 18, 1994	To Hartford Whalers 9th round pick in 1994 – Matt Ball	To Toronto Maple Leafs Ken Belanger
March 21, 1994	To New York Rangers Glenn Anderson; Scott Malone; 4th round pick in 1994 – Alexander Korobolin	To Toronto Maple Leafs Mike Gartner
June 28, 1994	To New York Islanders 2nd round pick in 1995 – D. J. Smith	To Toronto Maple Leafs 3rd round pick in 1994 – Fredrik Modin
June 28, 1994	To Quebec Nordiques Wendel Clark; Sylvain Lefebvre; Landon Wilson; 1st round pick in 1994 – Jeff Kealty	To Toronto Maple Leafs Mats Sundin; Garth Butcher; Todd Warriner; 1st round pick in 1994 – Nolan Baumgartner
June 28, 1994	To Washington Capitals Rob Pearson; 1st round pick in 1994 – Nolan Baumgartner	To Toronto Maple Leafs Mike Ridley; 1st round pick in 1994 – Eric Fichaud

=== Waivers ===
October 3, 1993	To Ottawa Senators Dave McLlwain
January 1, 1994	To Calgary Flames; Guy Larose
January 8, 1994	To Chicago Blackhawks Greg Smyth

=== Free agents ===
Player	Former team
Chris Snell	Buffalo Sabres
Rich Chernomaz	Calgary Flames
Bruce Racine	Pittsburgh Penguins
David Harlock	New Jersey Devils
Chris Govedaris	Hartford Whalers
Marcel Cousineau	Boston Bruins
Frank Bialowas	Undrafted Free Agent
Mark Kolesar	Undrafted Free Agent

Player	New team
Todd Hawkins	Pittsburgh Penguins
Bob Halkidis	Detroit Red Wings
Bob McGill	New York Islanders
Rob Cimetta	Chicago Blackhawks

== Draft picks ==
Toronto's draft picks at the 1993 NHL entry draft held at the Quebec Coliseum in Quebec City, Quebec.

Round	#	Player	Nationality	College/Junior/Club team (League)
1	12	Kenny Jonsson	Sweden	Rögle BK (Sweden)
1	19	Landon Wilson	United States	Dubuque Fighting Saints (USHL)
5	123	Zdenek Nedved	Czech Republic	Sudbury Wolves (OHL)
6	149	Paul Vincent	United States	Cushing Academy (USHS–MA)
7	175	Jeff Andrews	Canada	North Bay Centennials (OHL)
8	201	David Brumby	Canada	Tri-City Americans (WHL)
10	253	Kyle Ferguson	Canada	Michigan Technological University (WCHA)
11	279	Mikhail Lapin	Russia	Western Michigan University (CCHA)

== Farm teams ==
- The Maple Leafs farm team was the St. John's Maple Leafs in St. John's, Newfoundland.
