= 1993–94 Edmonton Oilers season =

NHL team season

1993–94 Edmonton Oilers
- Division: 6th Pacific
- Conference: 11th Western
- 1993–94 record: 25–45–14
- Home record: 17–22–3
- Road record: 8–23–11
- Goals for: 261
- Goals against: 305

Team information
- General manager: Glen Sather
- Coach: Ted Green (Oct.–Jan.); Glen Sather (Jan.–Apr.)
- Captain: Craig MacTavish (Oct.–Mar.); Vacant (Mar.–Apr.)
- Alternate captains: Jason Arnott (Mar.–Apr.); Kelly Buchberger; Shayne Corson; Dave Manson (Oct.–Mar.); Doug Weight (Mar.–Apr.)
- Arena: Northlands Coliseum
- Average attendance: 13,437 (76.8%)
- Minor league affiliates: Cape Breton Oilers (AHL); Wheeling Thunderbirds (ECHL)

Team leaders
- Goals: Jason Arnott (33)
- Assists: Doug Weight (50)
- Points: Doug Weight (74)
- Penalty minutes: Kelly Buchberger (199)
- Plus/minus: Dean McAmmond (+12)
- Wins: Bill Ranford (22)
- Goals against average: Bill Ranford (3.48)

The 1993–94 Edmonton Oilers season was the Oilers' 15th season in the NHL, and they were coming off their worst season in team history in 1992–93, finishing with only 60 points and failing to qualify for the playoffs for the first time in franchise history.

During the off-season, the NHL announced it renamed the divisions and conferences, and the Oilers were placed in the newly created Pacific Division in the Western Conference, along with their Battle of Alberta rivals, the Calgary Flames, Vancouver Canucks, Los Angeles Kings, San Jose Sharks, and the expansion Mighty Ducks of Anaheim.

Edmonton got off to a horrible start, starting the year 3–18–3, before head coach Ted Green was fired and replaced by Glen Sather for the rest of the season. The Oilers played much better under Sather but still fail to qualify for the playoffs for the 2nd straight season, finishing 18 points behind the 8th seeded San Jose Sharks. During the season, Edmonton once again traded veteran players for youngsters, as team captain Craig MacTavish was dealt to the New York Rangers for Todd Marchant, while Dave Manson was shipped to the Winnipeg Jets for Boris Mironov.

Offensively, Doug Weight led the club with 74 points, while 19-year-old rookie Jason Arnott scored a team high 33 goals, and finish just behind Weight with 68 points. Shayne Corson and Zdeno Cíger each scored over 20 goals, with 25 and 22 respectively. Igor Kravchuk led the Oilers blueline with 12 goals and 50 points, while Bob Beers put together a solid season on defense, scoring 10 goals and 37 points. Kelly Buchberger was the team leader in penalty minutes, accumulating 199.

In goal, Bill Ranford appeared in a career high 71 games, winning 22 of them, with a 3.48 GAA and 1 shutout. Rookie Fred Brathwaite backed him up, appearing in 19 games, and winning 3 of them.

The Oilers scored the fewest shorthanded goals (2) during the regular season.

== Season standings ==
Pacific Division
No.	CR		GP	W	L	T	GF	GA	Pts
1	3	**Calgary Flames**	84	42	29	13	302	256	97
2	7	**Vancouver Canucks**	84	41	40	3	279	276	85
3	8	**San Jose Sharks**	84	33	35	16	252	265	82
4	9	Mighty Ducks of Anaheim	84	33	46	5	229	251	71
5	10	Los Angeles Kings	84	27	45	12	294	322	66
6	11	Edmonton Oilers	84	25	45	14	261	305	64

Note: No. = Division rank, CR = Conference rank, W = Wins, L = Losses, T = Ties, GF = Goals For, GA = Goals Against, Pts = Points
Teams that qualified for the playoffs are highlighted in bold.

Western Conference
R		Div	GP	W	L	T	GF	GA	Pts
**1**	**y- Detroit Red Wings ***	**CEN**	**84**	**46**	**30**	**8**	**356**	**275**	**100**
**2**	**x- Calgary Flames ***	**PAC**	**84**	**42**	**29**	**13**	**302**	**256**	**97**
**3**	**Toronto Maple Leafs**	**CEN**	**84**	**43**	**29**	**12**	**280**	**243**	**98**
**4**	**Dallas Stars**	**CEN**	**84**	**42**	**29**	**13**	**286**	**265**	**97**
**5**	**St. Louis Blues**	**CEN**	**84**	**40**	**33**	**11**	**270**	**283**	**91**
**6**	**Chicago Blackhawks**	**CEN**	**84**	**39**	**36**	**9**	**254**	**240**	**87**
**7**	**Vancouver Canucks**	**PAC**	**84**	**41**	**40**	**3**	**279**	**276**	**85**
**8**	**San Jose Sharks**	**PAC**	**84**	**33**	**35**	**16**	**252**	**265**	**82**
9	Mighty Ducks of Anaheim	PAC	84	33	46	5	229	251	71
10	Los Angeles Kings	PAC	84	27	45	12	294	322	66
11	Edmonton Oilers	PAC	84	25	45	14	261	305	64
12	Winnipeg Jets	CEN	84	24	51	9	245	344	57

Divisions: CEN – Central, PAC – Pacific

bold – Qualified for playoffs; x – Won division; y – Won Conference (and division); * – Division leader

== Schedule and results ==
1993–94 regular season
October: 2–10–1 (home: 2–5–0; road: 0–5–1)

Game	Date	Visitor	Score	Home	OT	Decision	Attendance	Record	Pts	Recap
1	October 6	San Jose Sharks	2 – 3	Edmonton Oilers		Ranford	13,121	1–0–0	2	W
2	October 8	New York Islanders	1 – 5	Edmonton Oilers		Ranford	12,405	2–0–0	4	W
3	October 11	Edmonton Oilers	1 – 4	Vancouver Canucks		Ranford	13,672	2–1–0	4	L
4	October 13	Edmonton Oilers	3 – 4	Mighty Ducks of Anaheim		Brathwaite	15,570	2–2–0	4	L
5	October 14	Edmonton Oilers	4 – 4	Los Angeles Kings	OT	Ranford	14,813	2–2–1	5	T
6	October 16	Vancouver Canucks	3 – 2	Edmonton Oilers		Ranford	13,032	2–3–1	5	L
7	October 18	Edmonton Oilers	3 – 6	Winnipeg Jets		Brathwaite	12,082	2–4–1	5	L
8	October 20	Calgary Flames	5 – 3	Edmonton Oilers		Ranford	11,525	2–5–1	5	L
9	October 22	Boston Bruins	3 – 1	Edmonton Oilers		Ranford	13,387	2–6–1	5	L
10	October 24	Washington Capitals	3 – 2	Edmonton Oilers	OT	Ranford	11,063	2–7–1	5	L
11	October 26	Edmonton Oilers	1 – 3	San Jose Sharks		Brathwaite	13,457	2–8–1	5	L
12	October 29	Buffalo Sabres	6 – 3	Edmonton Oilers		Ranford	13,011	2–9–1	5	L
13	October 30	Edmonton Oilers	1 – 4	Calgary Flames		Ranford	19,128	2–10–1	5	L

November: 2–9–2 (home: 1–5–0; road: 1–4–2)

Game	Date	Visitor	Score	Home	OT	Decision	Attendance	Record	Pts	Recap
14	November 3	Ottawa Senators	7 – 5	Edmonton Oilers		Ranford	11,382	2–11–1	5	L
15	November 6	Edmonton Oilers	5 – 6	St. Louis Blues	OT	Brathwaite	17,849	2–12–1	5	L
16	November 7	Edmonton Oilers	0 – 3	Chicago Blackhawks		Brathwaite	17,375	2–13–1	5	L
17	November 9	Edmonton Oilers	4 – 2	Detroit Red Wings		Ranford	19,875	3–13–1	7	W
18	November 11	Edmonton Oilers	1 – 5	Boston Bruins		Ranford	13,354	3–14–1	7	L
19	November 13	Edmonton Oilers	4 – 4	Hartford Whalers	OT	Ranford	12,119	3–14–2	8	T
20	November 15	Edmonton Oilers	5 – 5	Toronto Maple Leafs	OT	Ranford	15,728	3–14–3	9	T
21	November 17	Edmonton Oilers	1 – 3	Montreal Canadiens		Ranford	16,186	3–15–3	9	L
22	November 20	Toronto Maple Leafs	3 – 2	Edmonton Oilers		Ranford	17,503	3–16–3	9	L
23	November 21	Mighty Ducks of Anaheim	4 – 2	Edmonton Oilers		Brathwaite	12,346	3–17–3	9	L
24	November 24	Chicago Blackhawks	3 – 1	Edmonton Oilers		Ranford	10,656	3–18–3	9	L
25	November 27	Vancouver Canucks	1 – 2	Edmonton Oilers		Ranford	13,782	4–18–3	11	W
26	November 29	Dallas Stars	6 – 5	Edmonton Oilers	OT	Ranford	10,784	4–19–3	11	L

December: 7–5–2 (home: 6–1–0; road: 1–4–2)

Game	Date	Visitor	Score	Home	OT	Decision	Attendance	Record	Pts	Recap
27	December 1	Philadelphia Flyers	1 – 3	Edmonton Oilers		Ranford	11,547	5–19–3	13	W
28	December 5	Edmonton Oilers	3 – 4	Dallas Stars		Ranford	14,477	5–20–3	13	L
29	December 7	Edmonton Oilers	4 – 4	New York Islanders	OT	Ranford	8,780	5–20–4	14	T
30	December 8	Edmonton Oilers	1 – 1	New York Rangers	OT	Ranford	18,200	5–20–5	15	T
31	December 11	Edmonton Oilers	2 – 5	New Jersey Devils		Cowley	8,705	5–21–5	15	L
32	December 12	Edmonton Oilers	2 – 1	Philadelphia Flyers		Ranford	17,106	6–21–5	17	W
33	December 15	Vancouver Canucks	2 – 7	Edmonton Oilers		Ranford	11,094	7–21–5	19	W
34	December 17	San Jose Sharks	2 – 4	Edmonton Oilers		Ranford	12,803	8–21–5	21	W
35	December 19	St. Louis Blues	4 – 1	Edmonton Oilers		Ranford	13,628	8–22–5	21	L
36	December 21	Edmonton Oilers	3 – 6	Vancouver Canucks		Ranford	14,693	8–23–5	21	L
37	December 22	Calgary Flames	3 – 7	Edmonton Oilers		Ranford	15,186	9–23–5	23	W
38	December 27	Winnipeg Jets	0 – 6	Edmonton Oilers		Ranford	14,836	10–23–5	25	W
39	December 29	Montreal Canadiens	3 – 6	Edmonton Oilers		Ranford	17,503	11–23–5	27	W
40	December 30	Edmonton Oilers	1 – 7	Calgary Flames		Ranford	20,230	11–24–5	27	L

January: 2–7–3 (home: 1–3–2; road: 1–4–1)

Game	Date	Visitor	Score	Home	OT	Decision	Attendance	Record	Pts	Recap
41	January 2	San Jose Sharks	4 – 4	Edmonton Oilers	OT	Ranford	12,758	11–24–6	28	T
42	January 7	Quebec Nordiques	4 – 6	Edmonton Oilers		Ranford	15,057	12–24–6	30	W
43	January 9	Edmonton Oilers	4 – 2	Chicago Blackhawks		Ranford	17,432	13–24–6	32	W
44	January 11	Edmonton Oilers	2 – 5	Dallas Stars		Ranford	16,246	13–25–6	32	L
45	January 13	Edmonton Oilers	4 – 6	St. Louis Blues		Ranford	16,703	13–26–6	32	L
46	January 15	Edmonton Oilers	3 – 4	Pittsburgh Penguins		Ranford	17,476	13–27–6	32	L
47	January 18	Edmonton Oilers	3 – 4	Ottawa Senators	OT	Ranford	10,410	13–28–6	32	L
48	January 19	Edmonton Oilers	1 – 1	Buffalo Sabres	OT	Ranford	12,951	13–28–7	33	T
49	January 24	Vancouver Canucks	5 – 4	Edmonton Oilers	OT	Ranford	10,801	13–29–7	33	L
50	January 26	New Jersey Devils	3 – 3	Edmonton Oilers	OT	Ranford	12,028	13–29–8	34	T
51	January 28	St. Louis Blues	3 – 2	Edmonton Oilers		Ranford	12,299	13–30–8	34	L
52	January 29	Dallas Stars	5 – 3	Edmonton Oilers		Ranford	12,709	13–31–8	34	L

February: 4–7–2 (home: 4–4–1; road: 0–3–1)

Game	Date	Visitor	Score	Home	OT	Decision	Attendance	Record	Pts	Recap
53	February 2	Los Angeles Kings	4 – 6	Edmonton Oilers		Ranford	14,238	14–31–8	36	W
54	February 4	Chicago Blackhawks	3 – 1	Edmonton Oilers		Ranford	13,524	14–32–8	36	L
55	February 6	Winnipeg Jets	2 – 5	Edmonton Oilers		Ranford	11,742	15–32–8	38	W
56	February 7	Edmonton Oilers	3 – 4	Calgary Flames		Ranford	18,833	15–33–8	38	L
57	February 9	Calgary Flames	6 – 1	Edmonton Oilers		Ranford	12,543	15–34–8	38	L
58	February 12	Hartford Whalers	5 – 2	Edmonton Oilers		Brathwaite	11,395	15–35–8	38	L
59	February 13	Mighty Ducks of Anaheim	6 – 3	Edmonton Oilers		Ranford	13,453	15–36–8	38	L
60	February 15	Edmonton Oilers	2 – 2	Washington Capitals	OT	Ranford	12,619	15–36–9	39	T
61	February 18	Edmonton Oilers	1 – 5	Detroit Red Wings		Ranford	19,875	15–37–9	39	L
62	February 19	Edmonton Oilers	2 – 3	Toronto Maple Leafs		Ranford	15,278	15–38–9	39	L
63	February 23	Toronto Maple Leafs	3 – 6	Edmonton Oilers		Ranford	15,416	16–38–9	41	W
64	February 25	Los Angeles Kings	5 – 5	Edmonton Oilers	OT	Ranford	17,225	16–38–10	42	T
65	February 27	Tampa Bay Lightning	2 – 3	Edmonton Oilers		Ranford	11,719	17–38–10	44	W

March: 5–5–2 (home: 2–3–0; road: 3–2–2)

Game	Date	Visitor	Score	Home	OT	Decision	Attendance	Record	Pts	Recap
66	March 1	Edmonton Oilers	7 – 4	Vancouver Canucks		Ranford	14,767	18–38–10	46	W
67	March 3	Edmonton Oilers	2 – 4	San Jose Sharks		Ranford	17,190	18–39–10	46	L
68	March 4	Edmonton Oilers	1 – 4	Mighty Ducks of Anaheim		Ranford	17,174	18–40–10	46	L
69	March 9	Florida Panthers	5 – 3	Edmonton Oilers		Ranford	12,566	18–41–10	46	L
70	March 11	Detroit Red Wings	2 – 4	Edmonton Oilers		Ranford	15,659	19–41–10	48	W
71	March 16	Edmonton Oilers	4 – 4	Tampa Bay Lightning	OT	Ranford	18,274	19–41–11	49	T
72	March 18	Edmonton Oilers	4 – 4	Florida Panthers	OT	Brathwaite	14,674	19–41–12	50	T
73	March 20	Edmonton Oilers	5 – 3	Quebec Nordiques		Ranford	14,236	20–41–12	52	W
74	March 23	New York Rangers	5 – 3	Edmonton Oilers		Brathwaite	14,186	20–42–12	52	L
75	March 25	Los Angeles Kings	4 – 3	Edmonton Oilers	OT	Brathwaite	17,503	20–43–12	52	L
76	March 27	Pittsburgh Penguins	3 – 5	Edmonton Oilers		Ranford	15,064	21–43–12	54	W
77	March 31	Edmonton Oilers	3 – 2	Mighty Ducks of Anaheim	OT	Brathwaite	17,174	22–43–12	56	W

April: 3–2–2 (home: 1–1–0; road: 2–1–2)

Game	Date	Visitor	Score	Home	OT	Decision	Attendance	Record	Pts	Recap
78	April 2	Edmonton Oilers	5 – 3	Los Angeles Kings		Ranford	14,108	23–43–12	58	W
79	April 3	Edmonton Oilers	1 – 6	Los Angeles Kings		Ranford	10,363	23–44–12	58	L
80	April 6	Edmonton Oilers	4 – 3	Winnipeg Jets		Brathwaite	10,961	24–44–12	60	W
81	April 8	Mighty Ducks of Anaheim	3 – 1	Edmonton Oilers		Brathwaite	15,701	24–45–12	60	L
82	April 10	Detroit Red Wings	3 – 4	Edmonton Oilers		Brathwaite	16,198	25–45–12	62	W
83	April 13	Edmonton Oilers	2 – 2	San Jose Sharks	OT	Brathwaite	17,190	25–45–13	63	T
84	April 14	Edmonton Oilers	2 – 2	Los Angeles Kings	OT	Brathwaite	16,005	25–45–14	64	T

Legend: W Win (2 points) L Loss (0 points) T Tie (1 point)

== Player statistics ==
=== Scoring ===
- Position abbreviations: C = Centre; D = Defence; G = Goaltender; LW = Left wing; RW = Right wing
- † = Joined team via a transaction (e.g., trade, waivers, signing) during the season. Stats reflect time with the Oilers only.
- ‡ = Left team via a transaction (e.g., trade, waivers, release) during the season. Stats reflect time with the Oilers only.

No.	Player	Pos	Regular season					
No.	Player	Pos	GP	G	A	Pts	+/-	PIM
39	Doug Weight	C	84	24	50	74	−22	47
7	Jason Arnott	C	78	33	35	68	1	104
8	Zdeno Ciger	RW	84	22	35	57	−11	8
9	Shayne Corson	LW	64	25	29	54	−8	118
21	Igor Kravchuk	D	81	12	38	50	−12	16
33	Scott Pearson	LW	72	19	18	37	−4	165
2	Bob Beers†	D	66	10	27	37	−11	74
12	Steven Rice	RW	63	17	15	32	−10	36
15	Fredrik Olausson†	D	55	9	19	28	−4	20
10	Ilya Byakin	D	44	8	20	28	−3	30
37	Dean McAmmond	LW	45	6	21	27	12	16
14	Craig MacTavish‡	C	66	16	10	26	−20	80
16	Kelly Buchberger	RW	84	3	18	21	−20	199
18	Kirk Maltby	RW	68	11	8	19	−2	74
23	Vladimir Vujtek	C	40	4	15	19	−7	14
34	Brent Grieve†	LW	24	13	5	18	4	14
24	Dave Manson‡	D	57	3	13	16	−4	140
25	Mike Stapleton†	C	23	5	9	14	−1	28
17	Scott Thornton	C	61	4	7	11	−15	104
29	Louie DeBrusk	LW	48	4	6	10	−9	185
35	Adam Bennett†	D	48	3	6	9	−8	49
26	Shjon Podein	RW	28	3	5	8	3	8
27	Peter White	LW	26	3	5	8	1	2
22	Luke Richardson	D	69	2	6	8	−13	131
5	Brad Werenka‡	D	15	0	4	4	−1	14
28	Roman Oksiuta	RW	10	1	2	3	−1	4
25	Geoff Smith‡	D	21	0	3	3	−10	12
6	Ian Herbers	D	22	0	2	2	−6	32
20	Boris Mironov†	D	14	0	2	2	−4	14
30	Bill Ranford	G	71	0	2	2		2
2	Chris Joseph‡	D	10	1	1	2	−8	28
36	Todd Marchant†	C	3	0	1	1	−1	2
32	Gord Mark†	D	12	0	1	1	−2	43
31	Fred Brathwaite	G	19	0	0	0		0
20	Jeff Chychrun†	D	2	0	0	0	1	0
20	Jozef Cierny	LW	1	0	0	0	−1	0
1	Wayne Cowley	G	1	0	0	0		0
27	Todd Elik‡	C	4	0	0	0	0	6
34	Alexander Kerch	LW	5	0	0	0	−8	2
20	Marc Laforge‡	D	5	0	0	0	−2	21
34	Darcy Martini	D	2	0	0	0	−1	0
19	Tyler Wright	C	5	0	0	0	−3	4
20	Brad Zavisha	LW	2	0	0	0	−2	0

=== Goaltending ===
No.	Player	Regular season									
No.	Player	GP	W	L	T	SA	GA	GAA	SV%	SO	TOI
30	Bill Ranford	71	22	34	11	2325	236	3.48	.898	1	4070
31	Fred Brathwaite	19	3	10	3	523	58	3.54	.889	0	982
1	Wayne Cowley	1	0	1	0	35	3	3.15	.914	0	57

== Awards and records ==
=== Milestones ===
Regular Season
Player	Milestone	Reached
Jason Arnott	1st NHL Game; 1st NHL Goal; 1st NHL Point	October 6, 1993
Ian Herbers	1st NHL Game; 1st NHL Assist; 1st NHL Point	October 6, 1993
Roman Oksiuta	1st NHL Game	October 6, 1993
Jason Arnott	1st NHL Assist	October 8, 1993
Chris Joseph	200th NHL PIM	October 8, 1993
Kirk Maltby	1st NHL Game; 1st NHL Goal; 1st NHL Point	October 8, 1993
Fred Brathwaite	1st NHL Game	October 13, 1993
Shayne Corson	200th NHL Assist	October 16, 1993
Dean McAmmond	1st NHL Goal	October 18, 1993
Dave Manson	500th NHL Game	October 20, 1993
Aleksandrs Kerčs	1st NHL Game	October 29, 1993
Adam Bennett	1st NHL Goal	November 6, 1993
Ilya Byakin	1st NHL Game; 1st NHL Goal; 1st NHL Assist; 1st NHL Point	November 6, 1993
Shayne Corson	3rd NHL Hat-trick	November 15, 1993
Geoff Smith	300th NHL Game	November 15, 1993
Kelly Buchberger	1,000th NHL PIM	November 20, 1993
Kirk Maltby	1st NHL Assist	November 20, 1993
Peter White	1st NHL Game	November 27, 1993
Craig MacTavish	700th NHL PIM	November 29, 1993
Peter White	1st NHL Goal; 1st NHL Point	November 29, 1993
Igor Kravchuk	100th NHL Game	December 8, 1993
Wayne Cowley	1st NHL Game	December 11, 1993
Peter White	1st NHL Assist	December 11, 1993
Fredrik Olausson	200th NHL PIM; 500th NHL Game	December 12, 1993
Doug Weight	100th NHL Point	December 12, 1993
Doug Weight	100th NHL PIM	December 15, 1993
Kelly Buchberger	400th NHL Game	December 17, 1993
Scott Pearson	400th NHL PIM	December 27, 1993
Zdeno Cíger	100th NHL Point	December 29, 1993
Scott Thornton	100th NHL PIM	December 29, 1993
Louie DeBrusk	100th NHL Game	January 9, 1994
Darcy Martini	1st NHL Game	January 13, 1994
Louie DeBrusk	400th NHL PIM	January 15, 1994
Jozef Čierny	1st NHL Game	January 18, 1994
Shayne Corson	1,200th NHL PIM	January 28, 1994
Scott Pearson	200th NHL Game	February 2, 1994
Craig MacTavish	900th NHL Game	February 6, 1994
Roman Oksiuta	1st NHL Goal; 1st NHL Point	February 6, 1994
Roman Oksiuta	1st NHL Assist	February 7, 1994
Brent Grieve	1st NHL Game; 1st NHL Assist; 1st NHL Point	February 12, 1994
Dave Manson	1,700th NHL PIM	February 12, 1994
Luke Richardson	900th NHL PIM	February 15, 1994
Brad Zavisha	1st NHL Game	February 15, 1994
Brent Grieve	1st NHL Goal	February 18, 1994
Kelly Buchberger	1,100th NHL PIM	February 19, 1994
Brent Grieve	1st NHL Hat-trick	February 25, 1994
Scott Thornton	100th NHL Game	February 25, 1994
Scott Pearson	2nd NHL Gordie Howe hat trick	February 27, 1994
Doug Weight	200th NHL Game	March 9, 1994
Zdeno Cíger	200th NHL Game	March 16, 1994
Boris Mironov	100th NHL PIM	March 20, 1994
Todd Marchant	1st NHL Assist; 1st NHL Point	March 25, 1994
Fred Brathwaite	1st NHL Win	March 31, 1994
Bob Beers	200th NHL PIM	April 2, 1994
Bill Ranford	400th NHL Game	April 2, 1994
Jason Arnott	100th NHL PIM	April 3, 1994
Steven Rice	100th NHL Game	April 3, 1994
Luke Richardson	500th NHL Game	April 6, 1994
Doug Weight	100th NHL Assist	April 6, 1994
Louie DeBrusk	500th NHL PIM	April 10, 1994

== Transactions ==
=== Trades ===
June 16, 1993	To Tampa Bay Lightning Petr Klima	To Edmonton Oilers 3rd-round pick in 1994
June 20, 1993	To Quebec Nordiques Martin Gelinas; 6th-round pick in 1994	To Edmonton Oilers Scott Pearson
August 30, 1993	To Detroit Red Wings Peter Ing	To Edmonton Oilers 7th-round pick in 1994; Future considerations
September 1, 1993	To Buffalo Sabres Craig Simpson	To Edmonton Oilers Josef Cierny; 4th-round pick in 1994
September 10, 1993	To San Jose Sharks 10th-round pick in 1994	To Edmonton Oilers Link Gaetz
September 15, 1993	To Ottawa Senators Brian Glynn	To Edmonton Oilers 8th-round pick in 1994
October 7, 1993	To Chicago Blackhawks Kevin Todd	To Edmonton Oilers Adam Bennett
November 2, 1993	To Los Angeles Kings Future considerations	To Edmonton Oilers Jeff Chychrun
November 11, 1993	To Tampa Bay Lightning Chris Joseph	To Edmonton Oilers Bob Beers
December 6, 1993	To Florida Panthers Geoff Smith; 4th-round pick in 1994	To Edmonton Oilers 3rd-round pick in 1994; 6th-round pick in 1994
December 6, 1993	To Winnipeg Jets 3rd-round pick in 1994	To Edmonton Oilers Fredrik Olausson; 7th-round pick in 1994
December 9, 1993	To Winnipeg Jets Craig Fisher	To Edmonton Oilers Cash
December 15, 1993	To New York Islanders Marc Laforge	To Edmonton Oilers Brent Grieve
March 15, 1994	To Winnipeg Jets Dave Manson; 6th-round pick in 1994	To Edmonton Oilers Boris Mironov; Mats Lindgren; 1st-round pick in 1994; 4th-round pick in 1994
March 21, 1994	To New York Rangers Craig MacTavish	To Edmonton Oilers Todd Marchant
March 21, 1994	To Quebec Nordiques Brad Werenka	To Edmonton Oilers Steve Passmore

=== Free agents ===
Player	New team
G Wayne Cowley	Cape Breton Oilers (AHL)
G Fred Brathwaite	Detroit Junior Red Wings (OHL)
D Gord Mark	Cape Breton Oilers (AHL)
D Greg de Vries	Niagara Falls Thunder (OHL)
D Scott Ferguson	Kamloops Blazers (WHL)

Player	Former team
G Pokey Reddick	Florida Panthers
D Brian Benning	Florida Panthers
F Dan Currie	Los Angeles Kings
F Shaun Van Allen	Mighty Ducks of Anaheim
G Norm Foster	Philadelphia Flyers
D Jeff Bloemberg	Hartford Whalers
F David Haas	Calgary Flames
F Bill McDougall	Tampa Bay Lightning
D Brian Curran	Washington Capitals
D Kevin MacDonald	Ottawa Senators

=== Waivers ===
Date	Player	Team
October 3, 1993	Mike Hudson	to New York Rangers
October 6, 1993	François Leroux	to Ottawa Senators
October 26, 1993	Todd Elik	to San Jose Sharks
February 19, 1994	Mike Stapleton	from Pittsburgh Penguins

== Draft picks ==
Edmonton's draft picks at the 1993 NHL entry draft. The Oilers had two picks in the first round as part of the Wayne Gretzky trade.

Round	#	Player	Nationality	College/Junior/Club team (League)
1	7	Jason Arnott	Canada	Oshawa Generals (OHL)
1	16	Nick Stajduhar	Canada	London Knights (OHL)
2	33	David Vyborny	Czech Republic	Sparta Praha (Czech.)
3	59	Kevin Paden	United States	Detroit Jr. Red Wings (OHL)
3	60	Alexander Kerch	Russia	Pardaugava Riga (Russia)
5	111	Miroslav Satan	Slovakia	Dukla Trencin (Czech.)
7	163	Aleksandr Zhurik	Belarus	Dynamo Minsk (Russia)
8	189	Martin Bakula	Czech Republic	University of Alaska (NCAA)
9	215	Brad Norton	United States	Cushing Academy (USHS)
10	241	Oleg Maltsev	Russia	Traktor Chelyabinsk (Russia)
11	267	Ilya Byakin	Russia	Landshut EV (Germany)
S	7	Brett Abel	United States	University of New Hampshire (Hockey East)
