= 1993–94 Vancouver Canucks season =

24th season in franchise history

1993–94 Vancouver Canucks
- Western Conference champions
- Division: 2nd Pacific
- Conference: 7th Western
- 1993–94 record: 41–40–3
- Home record: 20–19–3
- Road record: 21–21–0
- Goals for: 279
- Goals against: 276

Team information
- General manager: Pat Quinn
- Coach: Pat Quinn
- Captain: Trevor Linden
- Alternate captains: Sergio Momesso; Dana Murzyn
- Arena: Pacific Coliseum
- Average attendance: 15,226
- Minor league affiliates: Hamilton Canucks; Columbus Chill

Team leaders
- Goals: Pavel Bure (60)
- Assists: Jeff Brown (52)
- Points: Pavel Bure (107)
- Penalty minutes: Gino Odjick (271)
- Plus/minus: Robert Dirk (+18)
- Wins: Kirk McLean (23)
- Goals against average: Kirk McLean (2.99)

The 1993–94 Vancouver Canucks season was the Canucks' 24th NHL season. Vancouver finished the season second in their division and qualified for the playoffs as the number seven seed. In the playoffs, the Canucks pulled several upsets and reached the Stanley Cup Final for the second time in franchise history. In the finals they fell behind the New York Rangers three games to one before making a comeback to force a game seven. Vancouver fell short in its bid to capture the franchise's first Stanley Cup losing game seven by a final of 3–2.

During the regular season, Pavel Bure tied his own club record for goals in a season, originally set in the 1992–93 season. Bure's 60 goals led the NHL and as a result he was named a First Team NHL All-Star. Kirk McLean won a team leading 23 games during the regular season, only 8 more than the 15 he recorded in the post-season games. Jeff Brown officially led the team in assists, but did not join the team till after the trade deadline when he was acquired from St. Louis.

In the playoffs, both Bure and captain Trevor Linden were very productive. Bure led all forwards in playoff scoring finishing second overall to Brian Leetch. However, Bure led the league in playoff goals with Linden tied for second. McLean led the playoffs in minutes played, shots against and saves while he and the Rangers Mike Richter tied for the lead in playoff shutouts. McLean finished fourth in goals against average and save percentage.

== Regular season ==
Pacific Division
No.	CR		GP	W	L	T	GF	GA	Pts
1	3	**Calgary Flames**	84	42	29	13	302	256	97
2	7	**Vancouver Canucks**	84	41	40	3	279	276	85
3	8	**San Jose Sharks**	84	33	35	16	252	265	82
4	9	Mighty Ducks of Anaheim	84	33	46	5	229	251	71
5	10	Los Angeles Kings	84	27	45	12	294	322	66
6	11	Edmonton Oilers	84	25	45	14	261	305	64

Note: No. = Division rank, CR = Conference rank, W = Wins, L = Losses, T = Ties, GF = Goals For, GA = Goals Against, Pts = Points
Teams that qualified for the playoffs are highlighted in bold.

Western Conference
R		Div	GP	W	L	T	GF	GA	Pts
**1**	**y- Detroit Red Wings ***	**CEN**	**84**	**46**	**30**	**8**	**356**	**275**	**100**
**2**	**x- Calgary Flames ***	**PAC**	**84**	**42**	**29**	**13**	**302**	**256**	**97**
**3**	**Toronto Maple Leafs**	**CEN**	**84**	**43**	**29**	**12**	**280**	**243**	**98**
**4**	**Dallas Stars**	**CEN**	**84**	**42**	**29**	**13**	**286**	**265**	**97**
**5**	**St. Louis Blues**	**CEN**	**84**	**40**	**33**	**11**	**270**	**283**	**91**
**6**	**Chicago Blackhawks**	**CEN**	**84**	**39**	**36**	**9**	**254**	**240**	**87**
**7**	**Vancouver Canucks**	**PAC**	**84**	**41**	**40**	**3**	**279**	**276**	**85**
**8**	**San Jose Sharks**	**PAC**	**84**	**33**	**35**	**16**	**252**	**265**	**82**
9	Mighty Ducks of Anaheim	PAC	84	33	46	5	229	251	71
10	Los Angeles Kings	PAC	84	27	45	12	294	322	66
11	Edmonton Oilers	PAC	84	25	45	14	261	305	64
12	Winnipeg Jets	CEN	84	24	51	9	245	344	57

Divisions: CEN – Central, PAC – Pacific

bold – Qualified for playoffs; x – Won division; y – Won Conference (and division); * – Division leader

== Schedule and results ==
=== Regular season ===
1993–94 regular season
October: 7–3–0 (home: 3–3–0; road: 4–0–0)

Game	Date	Visitor	Score	Home	OT	Record	Points	Recap
1	October 6	Vancouver	5–2	Los Angeles	–	1–0–0	2	W
2	October 9	Calgary	5–1	Vancouver	–	1–1–0	2	L
3	October 11	Edmonton	1–4	Vancouver	–	2–1–0	4	W
4	October 16	Vancouver	3–2	Edmonton	–	3–1–0	6	W
5	October 19	Boston	4–5	Vancouver	–	4–1–0	8	W
6	October 21	Vancouver	6–3	Calgary	–	5–1–0	10	W
7	October 23	Vancouver	6–4	San Jose	–	6–1–0	12	W
8	October 24	San Jose	2–3	Vancouver	OT	7–1–0	14	W
9	October 27	Washington	3–2	Vancouver	–	7–2–0	14	L
10	October 30	Buffalo	6–3	Vancouver	–	7–3–0	14	L

November: 7–7–0 (home: 4–3–0; road: 3–4–0)

Game	Date	Visitor	Score	Home	OT	Record	Points	Recap
11	November 2	Vancouver	2–1	NY Islanders	–	8–3–0	16	W
12	November 3	Vancouver	3–6	NY Rangers	–	8–4–0	16	L
13	November 5	Vancouver	2–3	Washington	–	8–5–0	16	L
14	November 7	Vancouver	5–2	Philadelphia	–	9–5–0	18	W
15	November 10	Los Angeles	0–4	Vancouver	–	10–5–0	20	W
16	November 13	Vancouver	4–3	Calgary	–	10–6–0	20	L
17	November 14	Anaheim	2–3	Vancouver	–	11–6–0	22	W
18	November 16	St. Louis	0–3	Vancouver	–	12–6–0	24	W
19	November 19	Anaheim	6–3	Vancouver	–	12–7–0	24	L
20	November 22	Toronto	5–2	Vancouver	–	12–8–0	24	L
21	November 24	Detroit	5–4	Vancouver	OT	12–9–0	24	L
22	November 26	Vancouver	5–3	Winnipeg	–	13–9–0	26	W
23	November 27	Vancouver	1–2	Edmonton	–	13–10–0	26	L
24	November 29	Chicago	1–2	Vancouver	OT	14–10–0	28	W

December: 5–8–0 (home: 3–3–0; road: 2–5–0)

Game	Date	Visitor	Score	Home	OT	Record	Points	Recap
25	December 2	Philadelphia	6–3	Vancouver	–	14–11–0	28	L
26	December 4	Vancouver	1–3	Quebec	–	14–12–0	28	L
27	December 6	Vancouver	3–4	Montreal	OT	14–13–0	28	L
28	December 8	Vancouver	4–1	Hartford	–	15–13–0	30	W
29	December 9	Vancouver	3–2	Boston	OT	16–13–0	32	W
30	December 14	Vancouver	4–8	Calgary	–	16–14–0	32	L
31	December 15	Vancouver	2–7	Edmonton	–	16–15–0	32	L
32	December 17	Winnipeg	1–6	Vancouver	–	17–15–0	34	W
33	December 19	Dallas	3–1	Vancouver	–	17–16–0	34	L
34	December 21	Edmonton	3–6	Vancouver	–	18–16–0	36	W
35	December 23	Calgary	3–4	Vancouver	–	19–16–0	38	W
36	December 28	Vancouver	5–6	Los Angeles	–	19–17–0	38	L
37	December 31	San Jose	3–2	Vancouver	–	19–18–0	38	L

January: 6–5–2 (home: 3–3–2; road: 3–2–0)

Game	Date	Visitor	Score	Home	OT	Record	Points	Recap
38	January 2	Montreal	3–2	Vancouver	–	19–19–0	38	L
39	January 5	Vancouver	7–2	Ottawa	–	20–19–0	40	W
40	January 8	Vancouver	5–3	Toronto	–	20–20–0	40	L
41	January 9	Vancouver	5–3	Buffalo	–	20–21–0	40	L
42	January 12	Quebec	3–4	Vancouver	–	21–21–0	42	W
43	January 14	Ottawa	2–2	Vancouver	OT	21–21–1	43	T
44	January 16	Vancouver	4–3	Anaheim	–	22–21–1	45	W
45	January 19	Calgary	4–3	Vancouver	–	22–22–1	45	L
46	January 24	Vancouver	5–4	Edmonton	OT	23–22–1	47	W
47	January 25	St. Louis	3–3	Vancouver	OT	23–22–2	48	T
48	January 27	Dallas	3–2	Vancouver	OT	23–23–2	48	L
49	January 29	New Jersey	3–6	Vancouver	–	24–23–2	50	W
50	January 31	Los Angeles	1–3	Vancouver	–	25–23–2	52	W

February: 5–5–1 (home: 2–1–1; road: 3–4–0)

Game	Date	Visitor	Score	Home	OT	Record	Points	Recap
51	February 2	Chicago	4–6	Vancouver	–	26–23–2	54	W
52	February 4	Vancouver	0–3	Anaheim	–	26–24–2	54	L
53	February 6	Hartford	4–2	Vancouver	–	26–25–2	54	L
54	February 8	Vancouver	6–3	Detroit	–	27–25–2	56	W
55	February 10	Vancouver	3–7	New Jersey	–	27–26–2	56	L
56	February 12	Vancouver	3–2	Tampa Bay	–	28–26–2	58	W
57	February 13	Vancouver	1–2	Florida	–	28–27–2	58	L
58	February 15	Vancouver	2–3	St. Louis	–	28–28–2	58	L
59	February 17	Vancouver	4–2	Chicago	–	29–28–2	60	W
60	February 22	Calgary	4–4	Vancouver	OT	29–28–3	61	T
61	February 26	Tampa Bay	1–3	Vancouver	–	30–28–3	63	W

March: 8–8–0 (home: 3–4–0; road: 5–4–0)

Game	Date	Visitor	Score	Home	OT	Record	Points	Recap
62	March 1	Edmonton	7–4	Vancouver	–	30–29–3	63	L
63	March 3	Vancouver	4–0	St. Louis	–	31–29–3	65	W
64	March 4	Vancouver	4–1	Dallas	–	32–29–3	67	W
65	March 7	Florida	2–1	Vancouver	–	32–30–3	67	L
66	March 9	NY Islanders	4–5	Vancouver	–	33–30–3	69	W
67	March 11	Vancouver	4–5	Winnipeg	–	34–30–3	71	W
68	March 13	Vancouver	2–5	Chicago	–	34–31–3	71	L
69	March 15	Vancouver	2–5	Detroit	–	34–32–3	71	L
70	March 16	Vancouver	2–5	Toronto	–	35–32–3	73	W
71	March 19	Vancouver	4–5	Pittsburgh	–	35–33–3	73	L
72	March 20	Vancouver	1–2	Dallas	OT	35–34–3	73	L
73	March 23	Vancouver	6–3	Los Angeles	–	36–34–3	75	W
74	March 25	NY Rangers	5–2	Vancouver	–	36–35–3	75	L
75	March 27	Los Angeles	3–4	Vancouver	–	37–35–3	77	W
76	March 28	Toronto	2–3	Vancouver	OT	38–35–3	79	W
77	March 30	Pittsburgh	3–1	Vancouver	–	38–36–3	79	L

April: 3–4–0 (home: 2–2–0; road: 1–2–0)

Game	Date	Visitor	Score	Home	OT	Record	Points	Recap
78	April 1	Winnipeg	1–5	Vancouver	–	39–36–3	81	W
79	April 2	Vancouver	4–7	San Jose	–	39–37–3	81	L
80	April 5	Detroit	8–3	Vancouver	–	39–38–3	81	L
81	April 7	San Jose	2–3	Vancouver	–	40–38–3	83	W
82	April 9	Anaheim	3–1	Vancouver	–	40–39–3	83	L
83	April 10	Vancouver	1–3	San Jose	–	40–40–3	83	L
84	April 13	Vancouver	2–1	Anaheim	–	41–40–3	85	W

Legend: W Win (2 points) L Loss (0 points) T Tie (1 point)

=== Playoffs ===
1994 Stanley Cup playoffs
Western Conference Quarterfinals vs. (2) Calgary Flames – Canucks win 4–3

Game	Date	Visitor	Score	Home	OT	Decision	Attendance	Series	Recap
1	April 18	Vancouver	5 – 0	Calgary		McLean	17,764	1 – 0	W
2	April 20	Vancouver	5 – 7	Calgary		McLean	18,318	1 – 1	L
3	April 22	Calgary	4 – 2	Vancouver		McLean	16,150	1 – 2	L
4	April 24	Calgary	3 – 2	Vancouver		McLean	16,150	1 – 3	L
5	April 26	Vancouver	2 – 1	Calgary	OT	McLean	19,059	2 – 3	W
6	April 28	Calgary	2 – 3	Vancouver	OT	McLean	16,150	3 – 3	W
7	April 30	Vancouver	4 – 3	Calgary	2OT	McLean	20,230	4 – 3	W

Western Conference Semifinals vs. (4) Dallas Stars – Canucks win 4–1

Game	Date	Visitor	Score	Home	OT	Decision	Attendance	Series	Recap
1	May 2	Vancouver	6 – 4	Dallas		McLean	16,914	1 – 0	W
2	May 4	Vancouver	3 – 0	Dallas		McLean	16,914	2 – 0	W
3	May 6	Dallas	4 – 3	Vancouver		McLean	16,150	2 – 1	L
4	May 8	Dallas	1 – 2	Vancouver	OT	McLean	16,150	3 – 1	W
5	May 10	Dallas	2 – 4	Vancouver		McLean	16,150	4 – 1	W

Western Conference Finals vs. (3) Toronto Maple Leafs – Canucks win 4–1

Game	Date	Visitor	Score	Home	OT	Decision	Attendance	Series	Recap
1	May 16	Vancouver	2 – 3	Toronto	OT	McLean	15,728	0 – 1	L
2	May 18	Vancouver	4 – 3	Toronto		McLean	15,728	1 – 1	W
3	May 20	Toronto	0 – 4	Vancouver		McLean	16,150	2 – 1	W
4	May 22	Toronto	0 – 2	Vancouver		McLean	16,150	3 – 1	W
5	May 24	Toronto	3 – 4	Vancouver	2OT	McLean	16,150	4 – 1	W

Stanley Cup Finals vs. (E1) New York Rangers – Rangers win 4–3

Game	Date	Visitor	Score	Home	OT	Decision	Attendance	Series	Recap
1	May 31	Vancouver	3 – 2	New York	OT	McLean	18,200	1 – 0	W
2	June 2	Vancouver	1 – 3	New York		McLean	18,200	1 – 1	L
3	June 4	New York	5 – 1	Vancouver		McLean	16,150	1 – 2	L
4	June 7	New York	4 – 2	Vancouver		McLean	16,150	1 – 3	L
5	June 9	Vancouver	6 – 3	New York		McLean	18,200	2 – 3	W
6	June 11	New York	1 – 4	Vancouver		McLean	16,150	3 – 3	W
7	June 14	Vancouver	2 – 3	New York		McLean	18,200	3 – 4	L

Legend: W Win L Loss

== Player statistics ==
=== Scoring ===
- Position abbreviations: C = Centre; D = Defence; G = Goaltender; LW = Left wing; RW = Right wing
- † = Joined team via a transaction (e.g., trade, waivers, signing) during the season. Stats reflect time with the Canucks only.
- ‡ = Left team via a transaction (e.g., trade, waivers, release) during the season. Stats reflect time with the Canucks only.

No.	Player	Pos	Regular season						Playoffs					
No.	Player	Pos	GP	G	A	Pts	+/-	PIM	GP	G	A	Pts	+/-	PIM
10	Pavel Bure	RW	76	60	47	107	1	86	24	16	15	31	8	40
14	Geoff Courtnall	LW	82	26	44	70	15	123	24	9	10	19	10	51
7	Cliff Ronning	C	76	25	43	68	7	42	24	5	10	15	−2	16
16	Trevor Linden	RW	84	32	29	61	6	73	24	12	13	25	3	18
32	Murray Craven	C	78	15	40	55	5	30	22	4	9	13	10	18
21	Jyrki Lumme	D	83	13	42	55	3	50	24	2	11	13	8	16
24	Jiri Slegr	D	78	5	33	38	0	86	—	—	—	—	—	—
8	Greg Adams	LW	68	13	24	37	−1	20	23	6	8	14	1	2
44	Dave Babych	D	73	4	28	32	0	52	24	3	5	8	4	12
29	Gino Odjick	LW	76	16	13	29	13	271	10	0	0	0	0	18
27	Sergio Momesso	LW	68	14	13	27	−2	149	24	3	4	7	7	56
5	Dana Murzyn	D	80	6	14	20	4	109	7	0	0	0	−4	4
17	Jimmy Carson†	C	34	7	10	17	−13	22	2	0	1	1	1	0
23	Martin Gelinas†	RW	33	8	8	16	−6	26	24	5	4	9	−1	14
20	Jose Charbonneau	RW	30	7	7	14	−3	49	3	1	0	1	1	4
4	Gerald Diduck	D	55	1	10	11	2	72	24	1	7	8	1	22
6	Adrien Plavsic	D	47	1	9	10	−5	6	—	—	—	—	—	—
15	John McIntyre	C	62	3	6	9	−9	38	24	0	1	1	−3	16
17	Dixon Ward‡	LW	33	6	1	7	−14	37	—	—	—	—	—	—
19	Tim Hunter	RW	56	3	4	7	−7	171	24	0	0	0	−3	26
36	Dane Jackson	RW	12	5	1	6	3	9	—	—	—	—	—	—
25	Dan Kesa	RW	19	2	4	6	−3	18	—	—	—	—	—	—
22	Jeff Brown†	D	11	1	5	6	2	10	24	6	9	15	7	37
22	Robert Dirk‡	D	65	2	3	5	18	105	—	—	—	—	—	—
2	Evgeny Namestnikov	D	17	0	5	5	−2	10	—	—	—	—	—	—
23 (Note: Eisenhut wore number 34 in his first game.)	Neil Eisenhut	C	13	1	3	4	0	21	—	—	—	—	—	—
1	Kirk McLean	G	52	0	4	4		2	24	0	1	1		0
18 (Note: Antoski wore number 31 in his first game.)	Shawn Antoski	LW	55	1	2	3	−11	190	16	0	1	1	−3	36
25	Nathan LaFayette†	C	11	1	1	2	2	4	20	2	7	9	13	4
25	Stephane Morin	LW	5	1	1	2	0	6	—	—	—	—	—	—
3	Bret Hedican†	D	8	0	1	1	1	0	24	1	6	7	13	16
28	Brian Glynn†	D	16	0	0	0	−4	12	17	0	3	3	5	10
33	Michael Peca	C	4	0	0	0	−1	2	—	—	—	—	—	—
35	Kay Whitmore	G	32	0	0	0		6	—	—	—	—	—	—

=== Goaltending ===
No.	Player	Regular season										Playoffs								
No.	Player	GP	W	L	T	SA	GA	GAA	SV%	SO	TOI	GP	W	L	SA	GA	GAA	SV%	SO	TOI
1	Kirk McLean	52	23	26	3	1430	156	2.99	.891	3	3128	24	15	9	820	59	2.29	.928	4	1544
35	Kay Whitmore	32	18	4	0	848	113	3.53	.867	0	1921	—	—	—	—	—	—	—	—	—

== Awards and records ==
- Clarence S. Campbell Bowl
- Pavel Bure, NHL Leader, Goals (60)
- Pavel Bure, Club Record, Goals in a Season (60)
- Pavel Bure, Molson Cup (Most game star selections for Vancouver Canucks)
- Pavel Bure, Cyclone Taylor Award (MVP of the Canucks)

== Transactions ==
=== Trades ===
June 23, 1993	To Vancouver Canucks John Vanbiesbrouck	To New York Rangers Doug Lidster
January 8, 1994	To Vancouver Canucks Jimmy Carson	To Los Angeles Kings Dixon Ward; Conditional draft pick in 1995.
March 14, 1994	To Vancouver Canucks Craig Janney; 2nd round draft pick in 1994 (Dave Scatchard)	To St. Louis Blues compensation for the signing of free agent Petr Nedved
March 21, 1994	To Vancouver Canucks Jeff Brown; Bret Hedican; Nathan LaFayette	To St. Louis Blues Craig Janney
March 21, 1994	To Vancouver Canucks 4th round pick in 1994 (Mike Dubinsky)	To Chicago Blackhawks Robert Dirk

=== Expansion draft ===
Vancouver's losses at the 1993 NHL expansion draft in Quebec City, Quebec.

Round	#	Player	Nationality	Drafted by	Drafted from
1	1	John Vanbiesbrouck (G)	United States	Florida Panthers	Vancouver Canucks
1	37	Anatoli Semenov (C)	Russia	Mighty Ducks of Anaheim	Vancouver Canucks

== Draft picks ==
Vancouver's picks at the 1993 NHL entry draft in Quebec City, Quebec.

Round	#	Player	Nationality	College/Junior/Club team (League)
1	20	Mike Wilson (D)	Canada	Sudbury Wolves (OHL)
2	46	Rick Girard (C)	Canada	Swift Current Broncos (WHL)
4	98	Dieter Kochan (G)	United States	Vernon Lakers (BCJHL)
5	124	Scott Walker (D)	Canada	Owen Sound Platers (OHL)
6	150	Troy Creurer (D)	Canada	Notre Dame Hounds (SJHL)
7	176	Yevgeni Babariko (C)	Russia	Torpedo Nizhny Novgorod (Vysshaya Liga)
8	202	Sean Tallaire (RW)	Canada	Lake Superior State University (NCAA)
10	254	Bert Robertsson (D)	Sweden	Södertälje SK (Allsvenskan)
11	280	Sergei Tkachenko (G)	Ukraine	Hamilton Canucks (AHL)

== Farm teams ==
=== Hamilton Canucks ===
The AHL affiliate based in Hamilton, Ontario and whose home arena was Copps Coliseum. This was the team's second and final season as an affiliate of the Canucks. In the 1993–94 AHL season, Hamilton finished in second place in the South Division, but was eliminated in the first round of the AHL playoffs by the Cornwall Aces in four straight games. After the season, the franchise was relocated as the Syracuse Crunch, which kept its affiliation with Vancouver.

=== Columbus Chill ===
The ECHL affiliate based in Columbus, Ohio, and whose home arena was the Ohio Expo Center Coliseum.
