= 1988 WCHA men's ice hockey tournament =

1988 WCHA Men's ice hockey tournament
- Dates: February 25-March 7, 1988
- Teams: 8
- Finals site: Civic Center; St. Paul, Minnesota
- Champions: Wisconsin (8th title)
- Winning coach: Jeff Sauer (3rd title)
- MVP: Dean Anderson (Wisconsin)
- Attendance: 51,807
- WCHA Men's Ice Hockey Tournaments

The 1988 WCHA Men's Ice Hockey Tournament was the 29th conference playoff in league history and 36th season where a WCHA champion was crowned. The tournament was played between February 25 and March 7, 1988. First round games were played at home team campus sites while all 'Final Four' matches were held, for the first time, at the Civic Center in St. Paul, Minnesota. This was the first year in the tournament's history that the championship game was held at a neutral site which it would continue to do henceforward (as of 2014). By winning the tournament, Wisconsin was awarded the Broadmoor Trophy and received the WCHA's automatic bid to the 1988 NCAA Division I Men's Ice Hockey Tournament.

Additionally, this was the first season that the WCHA named a tournament MVP as well as an All-Tournament Team.

== Format ==
The first round of the postseason tournament featured a best-of-three games format. Teams were seeded No. 1 through No. 8 according to their final conference standing, with a tiebreaker system used to seed teams with an identical number of points accumulated. The top four seeded teams each earned home ice and hosted one of the lower seeded teams.

The winners of the first round series advanced to the semifinal and championship rounds held at the Civic Center. All Final Four games used a single-elimination format. Teams were re-seeded No. 1 through No. 4 according to the final regular season conference standings, with the top remaining seed matched against lowest remaining seed in one semifinal game while the two other semifinalists meeting with the winners advancing to the championship game and the losers competing in a Third Place contest. The Tournament Champion received an automatic bid to the 1988 NCAA Division I Men's Ice Hockey Tournament.

=== Conference standings ===
Note: GP = Games played; W = Wins; L = Losses; T = Ties; PTS = Points; GF = Goals For; GA = Goals Against

1987–88 Western Collegiate Hockey Association standings
	Conference							Overall					
	GP	W	L	T	PTS	GF	GA	GP	W	L	T	GF	GA
Minnesota†	35	28	7	0	56	167	107	44	34	10	0	209	125
Wisconsin*	35	22	12	1	45	163	125	45	30	13	2	205	161
Denver	35	19	14	2	40	169	152	39	20	17	2	184	170
Michigan Tech	35	19	15	1	39	165	158	41	20	20	1	189	188
North Dakota	35	16	18	1	33	147	140	42	21	20	1	174	160
Minnesota-Duluth	35	15	18	2	32	143	155	41	18	21	2	163	179
Northern Michigan	35	14	17	4	32	145	147	40	16	20	4	164	159
Colorado College	35	3	31	1	7	102	206	38	4	33	1	111	222
Championship: Wisconsin † indicates conference regular season champion * indicates conference tournament champion

== Bracket ==
Teams are reseeded after the first round

First Round; February 25–28
1	Minnesota	7	5	—
8	Colorado College	0	0	—
2	Wisconsin	2*	5	—
7	Northern Michigan	1	4	—
(Pairings are reseeded after the first round)
3	Denver	2	3	—
6	Minnesota-Duluth	5	7	—
4	Michigan Tech	4	6	3
5	North Dakota	5	3	4*

Semifinals; March 6
1	Minnesota	6
6	Minnesota-Duluth	1
2	Wisconsin	2
5	North Dakota	1

Championship; March 7
1	Minnesota	2
2	Wisconsin	3
Third place
5	North Dakota	6
6	Minnesota-Duluth	0

Note: * denotes overtime period(s)

=== First round ===
==== (1) Minnesota vs. (8) Colorado College ====
February 26	Minnesota	7 – 0	Colorado College	Mariucci Arena

February 27	Minnesota	5 – 0	Colorado College	Mariucci Arena

Minnesota won series 2–0

==== (2) Wisconsin vs. (7) Northern Michigan ====
February 25	Wisconsin	2 – 1	OT	Northern Michigan	Dane County Coliseum

February 26	Wisconsin	5 – 4	Northern Michigan	Dane County Coliseum

Wisconsin won series 2–0

==== (3) Denver vs. (6) Minnesota-Duluth ====
February 26	Denver	2 – 5	Minnesota-Duluth	DU Arena

February 27	Denver	3 – 7	Minnesota-Duluth	DU Arena

Minnesota-Duluth won series 2–0

==== (4) Michigan Tech vs. (5) North Dakota ====
February 26	Michigan Tech	4 – 5	North Dakota	Student Ice Arena

February 27	Michigan Tech	6 – 3	North Dakota	Student Ice Arena

February 28	Michigan Tech	3 – 4	OT	North Dakota	Student Ice Arena

North Dakota won series 2–1

=== Semifinals ===
==== (1) Minnesota vs. (6) Minnesota-Duluth ====
March 6	Minnesota	6 – 0	Minnesota-Duluth	Civic Center

==== (2) Wisconsin vs. (5) North Dakota ====
March 6	Wisconsin	2 – 1	North Dakota	Civic Center

=== Third Place ===
==== (5) North Dakota vs. (6) Minnesota-Duluth ====
March 7	North Dakota	6 – 0	Minnesota-Duluth	Civic Center

=== Championship ===
==== (1) Minnesota vs. (2) Wisconsin ====
March 7	Minnesota	2 – 3	Wisconsin	Civic Center

== Tournament awards ==
=== All-Tournament Team ===
- F Neil Eisenhut (North Dakota)
- F Paul Ranheim (Wisconsin)
- F Steve Tuttle (Wisconsin)
- D Randy Skarda (Minnesota)
- D Paul Stanton (Wisconsin)
- G Dean Anderson* (Wisconsin)

* Most Valuable Player(s)

== See also ==
- Western Collegiate Hockey Association men's champions
