= Guy Larose =

Canadian ice hockey player

- Born: July 31, 1967 (age 58) Hull, Quebec, Canada
- Height: 5 ft 9 in (175 cm)
- Weight: 175 lb (79 kg; 12 st 7 lb)
- Position: Centre
- Shot: Left
- Played for: Winnipeg Jets; Toronto Maple Leafs; Calgary Flames; Boston Bruins
- NHL draft: 224th overall, 1985; Buffalo Sabres
- Playing career: 1987–2002

Guy B. Larose (born July 31, 1967) is a Canadian former professional ice hockey player. He is the son of former NHL player Claude Larose.

== Playing career ==
Larose was selected 2nd overall by the Guelph Platers in the 1984 Ontario Hockey League (OHL). He played major junior hockey in the OHL from 1984 to 1987 for the Guelph Platers and Ottawa 67's.

Larose was drafted 224th overall by the Buffalo Sabres in the 1985 NHL entry draft as a 17-year-old but never signed a contract with the Sabres. He inked a free agent deal with the Winnipeg Jets in 1987 but spent most of his tenure in the American Hockey League for the Moncton Hawks, and managed to play just ten games for the Jets. On January 22, 1991, he was traded to the New York Rangers for Rudy Poeschek, but never played for them and spent his entire tenure with the AHL's Binghamton Rangers, where he scored five goals in his very first game with Binghamton. He was traded again on December 26, 1991, to the Toronto Maple Leafs for Mike Stevens, and played the most games in the NHL for the team, but was unable to maintain a permanent role in the team, and again bounced around the leagues. On January 1, 1994, Larose was claimed off waivers by the Calgary Flames and played seven games for them. He signed with the Boston Bruins as a free agent but only managed to play four playoff games, as the Bruins lost four games to one to the New Jersey Devils in the first round.

Larose spent the next few seasons in the International Hockey League, playing for the Detroit Vipers, Las Vegas Thunder and the Houston Aeros, before spending a season in the Deutsche Eishockey Liga in Germany for the Revier Löwen. He returned to the IHL and spent four seasons with the Chicago Wolves and won the Turner Cup in 2000. He also won the Calder Cup in 2002 with the Chicago Wolves (AHL). He then retired in 2002 after splitting that year with the Wolves and the ECHL's Augusta Lynx.

== Career statistics ==
=== Regular season and playoffs ===
			Regular season					Playoffs
Season	Team	League	GP	G	A	Pts	PIM	GP	G	A	Pts	PIM
1983–84	Ottawa Jr. Senators	CJHL	54	37	66	103	66	—	—	—	—	—
1984–85	Guelph Platers	OHL	58	30	30	60	63	—	—	—	—	—
1985–86	Guelph Platters	OHL	37	12	36	48	55	—	—	—	—	—
1985–86	Ottawa 67s	OHL	28	19	25	44	63	—	—	—	—	—
1986–87	Ottawa 67s	OHL	66	28	49	77	77	11	2	8	10	27
1987–88	Moncton Hawks	AHL	77	22	31	53	127	—	—	—	—	—
1988–89	Winnipeg Jets	NHL	3	0	1	1	6	—	—	—	—	—
1988–89	Moncton Hawks	AHL	72	32	27	59	176	10	4	4	8	37
1989–90	Moncton Hawks	AHL	79	44	26	70	232	—	—	—	—	—
1990–91	Winnipeg Jets	NHL	7	0	0	0	0	—	—	—	—	—
1990–91	Moncton Hawks	AHL	35	14	10	24	60	—	—	—	—	—
1990–91	Binghamton Rangers	AHL	34	21	15	36	48	10	8	5	13	37
1991–92	Toronto Maple Leafs	NHL	34	9	5	14	27	—	—	—	—	—
1991–92	St. John's Maple Leafs	AHL	15	7	7	14	26	—	—	—	—	—
1991–92	Binghamton Rangers	AHL	30	10	11	21	36	—	—	—	—	—
1992–93	Toronto Maple Leafs	NHL	9	0	0	0	8	—	—	—	—	—
1992–93	St. John's Maple Leafs	AHL	5	0	1	1	8	9	5	2	7	6
1993–94	Toronto Maple Leafs	NHL	10	1	2	3	10	—	—	—	—	—
1993–94	St. John's Maple Leafs	AHL	23	13	16	29	41	—	—	—	—	—
1993–94	Calgary Flames	NHL	7	0	1	1	4	—	—	—	—	—
1993–94	Saint John Flames	AHL	15	11	11	22	20	7	3	2	5	22
1994–95	Providence Bruins	AHL	68	25	33	58	93	12	4	6	10	22
1994–95	Boston Bruins	NHL	—	—	—	—	—	4	0	0	0	0
1995–96	Detroit Vipers	IHL	50	28	15	43	53	—	—	—	—	—
1995–96	Las Vegas Thunder	IHL	25	10	22	32	54	15	3	6	9	14
1996–97	Houston Aeros	IHL	79	29	25	54	108	13	6	7	13	12
1997–98	Revierlöwen Oberhausen	DEL	43	12	16	28	73	3	1	1	2	0
1998–99	Chicago Wolves	IHL	80	19	22	41	117	10	1	3	4	14
1999–00	Chicago Wolves	IHL	79	9	24	33	100	16	1	4	5	14
2000–01	Chicago Wolves	IHL	81	13	22	35	32	16	2	3	5	10
2001–02	Chicago Wolves	AHL	11	3	3	6	7	24	2	2	4	12
2001–02	Augusta Lynx	ECHL	60	22	39	61	72	—	—	—	—	—
AHL totals			464	202	191	393	874	72	26	21	47	136
NHL totals			70	10	9	19	63	4	0	0	0	0
