= Adam Bennett =

Canadian ice hockey player, coach (born 1971)

- Born: March 30, 1971 (age 55) Georgetown, Ontario, Canada
- Height: 6 ft 4 in (193 cm)
- Weight: 206 lb (93 kg; 14 st 10 lb)
- Position: Defenceman
- Shot: Right
- Played for: Chicago Blackhawks; Edmonton Oilers
- NHL draft: 6th overall, 1989; Chicago Blackhawks
- Playing career: 1990–1996

Adam Bennett (born March 30, 1971) is a Canadian former professional ice hockey defenceman and coach. He was selected in the first round of the 1989 NHL entry draft, 6th overall, by the Chicago Blackhawks.

== Playing career ==
Bennett played junior with the Sudbury Wolves of the OHL. In his first season, he was drafted by the Blackhawks, but he played two more years in junior, culminating in an all-star selection at the end of the 1990–91 season. He turned professional immediately after the junior season ended, fitting in three games with the Indianapolis Ice of the IHL. Bennett spent the next two seasons splitting time in the IHL and the NHL, before finally being dealt to the Edmonton Oilers at the start of the 1993–94 NHL season. He played a career high 48 games for the Oilers, in what would be his last NHL season. He played just two more years of professional hockey, with the Cape Breton Oilers of the AHL and the Richmond Renegades of the ECHL.

== Post-playing career ==
Bennett joined the Mississauga Ice Dogs of the OHL as an assistant coach for the 1998–99 season. Adam is currently the GM and Head Coach at Clearwater Prep Hockey Academy in Clearwater, Florida.

== Awards ==
- 1991 - OHL Second All-Star Team

== Career statistics ==
			Regular season					Playoffs
Season	Team	League	GP	G	A	Pts	PIM	GP	G	A	Pts	PIM
1986–87	Georgetown Gemini	COJHL	1	0	0	0	0	—	—	—	—	—
1987–88	Georgetown Gemini	COJHL	32	9	31	40	63	—	—	—	—	—
1988–89	Sudbury Wolves	OHL	66	7	22	29	133	—	—	—	—	—
1989–90	Sudbury Wolves	OHL	65	18	44	61	116	7	1	2	3	23
1990–91	Sudbury Wolves	OHL	54	21	29	50	123	5	1	2	3	11
1990–91	Indianapolis Ice	IHL	3	0	1	1	12	2	0	0	0	0
1991–92	Indianapolis Ice	IHL	59	4	10	14	89	—	—	—	—	—
1991–92	Chicago Blackhawks	NHL	5	0	0	0	12	—	—	—	—	—
1992–93	Indianapolis Ice	IHL	39	8	16	24	69	2	0	0	0	2
1992–93	Chicago Blackhawks	NHL	16	0	2	2	8	—	—	—	—	—
1993–94	Cape Breton Oilers	AHL	7	2	5	7	7	—	—	—	—	—
1993–94	Edmonton Oilers	NHL	48	6	6	9	49	—	—	—	—	—
1994–95	Cape Breton Oilers	AHL	10	0	3	3	6	—	—	—	—	—
1995–96	Richmond Renegades	ECHL	5	0	1	1	2	—	—	—	—	—
IHL totals			101	12	27	39	170	4	0	0	0	2
NHL totals			69	3	8	11	69	—	—	—	—	—

== Transactions ==
- October 7, 1993 - Chicago trades Bennett to Edmonton for Kevin Todd

Preceded by Jeremy Roenick	Chicago Blackhawks first-round draft pick 1989	Succeeded by Karl Dykhuis
