= Frank Bialowas =

Canadian ice hockey player

- Born: September 25, 1970 (age 56) Winnipeg, Manitoba, Canada
- Height: 5 ft 11 in (180 cm)
- Weight: 220 lb (100 kg; 15 st 10 lb)
- Position: Left wing
- Shot: Left
- Played for: Toronto Maple Leafs Philadelphia Phantoms Roanoke Valley Rebels Richmond Renegades St. John’s Maple Leafs Portland Pirates Hershey Bears Indianapolis Ice Danbury Trashers Sherbrooke Saint-François
- NHL draft: Undrafted
- Playing career: 1991–2000; 2004–2006

Francis Michael "The Animal" Bialowas (born September 25, 1970) is a Canadian former professional ice hockey player who played in four National Hockey League (NHL) games with the Toronto Maple Leafs during the 1993–94 season. He was known as an enforcer during his eleven-season playing career and was a member of the Philadelphia Phantoms' 1998 Calder Cup championship team. He was inducted into the Phantoms' Hall of Fame in 2005.

== Career statistics ==
=== Regular season and playoffs ===
			Regular season					Playoffs
Season	Team	League	GP	G	A	Pts	PIM	GP	G	A	Pts	PIM
1987–88	Estevan Bruins	SJHL	56	8	12	20	256	—	—	—	—	—
1988–89	Winkler Flyers	MJHL	—	—	—	—	—	—	—	—	—	—
1989–90	Kildonan North Stars	MJHL	43	6	12	18	223	—	—	—	—	—
1990–91	Winkler Flyers	MJHL	26	2	9	11	153	—	—	—	—	—
1990–91	Weyburn Red Wings	SJHL	14	0	1	1	103	—	—	—	—	—
1991–92	Roanoke Valley Rebels	ECHL	23	4	2	6	150	3	0	0	0	4
1992–93	Richmond Renegades	ECHL	61	3	18	21	261	1	0	0	0	2
1992–93	St. John's Maple Leafs	AHL	7	1	0	1	28	1	0	0	0	0
1993–94	Toronto Maple Leafs	NHL	4	0	0	0	12	—	—	—	—	—
1993–94	St. John's Maple Leafs	AHL	69	2	8	10	352	7	0	3	3	25
1994–95	St. John's Maple Leafs	AHL	51	2	3	5	277	4	0	0	0	12
1995–96	Portland Pirates	AHL	65	4	3	7	211	7	0	0	0	42
1996–97	Philadelphia Phantoms	AHL	67	7	6	13	254	6	0	2	2	41
1997–98	Philadelphia Phantoms	AHL	65	5	7	12	259	19	0	0	0	26
1998–99	Philadelphia Phantoms	AHL	24	0	3	3	42	—	—	—	—	—
1998–99	Portland Pirates	AHL	6	0	0	0	10	—	—	—	—	—
1998–99	Indianapolis Ice	IHL	16	1	0	1	27	2	0	0	0	0
1999–00	Hershey Bears	AHL	40	4	3	7	65	8	1	0	1	32
2004–05	Sherbrooke Saint-François	LNAH	5	0	0	0	36	—	—	—	—	—
2004–05	Danbury Trashers	UHL	5	0	0	0	78	—	—	—	—	—
2005–06	Sherbrooke Saint-François	LNAH	4	0	0	0	27	—	—	—	—	—
2005–06	Danbury Trashers	UHL	1	0	0	0	0	—	—	—	—	—
AHL totals			394	25	33	58	1498	52	1	5	6	178
NHL totals			4	0	0	0	12	—	—	—	—	—
