= Chris Govedaris =

Canadian ice hockey player (born 1970)

- Born: February 2, 1970 (age 56) Toronto, Ontario, Canada
- Height: 6 ft 1 in (185 cm)
- Weight: 200 lb (91 kg; 14 st 4 lb)
- Position: Left wing
- Shot: Left
- Played for: Hartford Whalers; Toronto Maple Leafs
- National team: Canada
- NHL draft: 11th overall, 1988; Hartford Whalers
- Playing career: 1989–2001

Christopher Govedaris (born February 2, 1970) is a Canadian former professional ice hockey left winger.

Govedaris was born in Toronto, Ontario. As a youth, he played in the 1983 Quebec International Pee-Wee Hockey Tournament with the Toronto Marlboros minor ice hockey team. He was drafted in the first round, 11th overall, by the Hartford Whalers in the 1988 NHL entry draft. He played 45 games in the National Hockey League: 33 with the Whalers and 12 with the Toronto Maple Leafs.

== Career statistics ==
			Regular season					Playoffs
Season	Team	League	GP	G	A	Pts	PIM	GP	G	A	Pts	PIM
1985–86	Toronto Young Nationals AAA	MTHL	38	35	50	85	—	—	—	—	—	—
1985–86	St. Michael's Buzzers	MetJHL	2	0	1	1	2	—	—	—	—	—
1986–87	Toronto Marlboros	OHL	64	36	28	64	148	—	—	—	—	—
1987–88	Toronto Marlboros	OHL	62	42	38	80	118	4	2	3	5	10
1988–89	Toronto Marlboros	OHL	49	41	38	79	117	6	2	3	5	0
1989–90	Hartford Whalers	NHL	12	0	1	1	6	2	0	0	0	2
1989–90	Binghamton Whalers	AHL	14	3	3	6	4	—	—	—	—	—
1989–90	Dukes of Hamilton	OHL	23	11	21	32	53	—	—	—	—	—
1990–91	Hartford Whalers	NHL	14	1	3	4	4	—	—	—	—	—
1990–91	Springfield Indians	AHL	56	26	36	62	133	9	2	5	7	36
1991–92	Springfield Indians	AHL	43	14	25	39	55	11	3	2	5	25
1992–93	Hartford Whalers	NHL	7	1	0	1	0	—	—	—	—	—
1992–93	Springfield Indians	AHL	65	31	24	55	58	15	7	4	11	18
1993–94	Toronto Maple Leafs	NHL	12	2	2	4	14	2	0	0	0	0
1993–94	St. John's Maple Leafs	AHL	62	35	35	70	76	11	6	5	11	22
1994–95	Adirondack Red Wings	AHL	24	19	11	30	34	4	2	1	3	10
1994–95	Milwaukee Admirals	IHL	54	34	25	59	71	—	—	—	—	—
1995–96	Minnesota Moose	IHL	81	31	36	67	133	—	—	—	—	—
1996–97	Eisbären Berlin	DEL	48	24	21	45	115	8	4	2	6	10
1997–98	Eisbären Berlin	DEL	46	20	26	46	42	10	2	6	8	10
1998–99	Eisbären Berlin	DEL	49	24	21	45	50	8	3	2	5	8
1999–2000	Eisbären Berlin	DEL	47	19	25	44	47	—	—	—	—	—
2000–01	Eisbären Berlin	DEL	58	26	26	52	32	—	—	—	—	—
2001–02	Leksands IF	SWE.2	35	26	11	37	63	3	0	0	0	6
NHL totals			45	4	6	10	24	4	0	0	0	2
AHL totals			264	128	134	262	360	50	20	17	37	111
DEL totals			248	113	119	232	286	26	9	10	19	28

=== International ===
Chris Govedaris
Medal record

Men's ice hockey

Representing Canada

World Championships
Bronze medal – third place	1995 Sweden	Ice hockey

Year	Team	Event	GP	G	A	Pts	PIM
1995	Canada	WC	8	1	0	1	6

Preceded by Jody Hull	Hartford Whalers first-round draft pick 1988	Succeeded by Bobby Holík
