= Wayne Cowley =

Canadian-British ice hockey player (born 1964)

- Born: December 4, 1964 (age 61) Scarborough, Ontario, Canada
- Height: 6 ft 0 in (183 cm)
- Weight: 185 lb (84 kg; 13 st 3 lb)
- Position: Goaltender
- Caught: Left
- Played for: Edmonton Oilers
- National team: Great Britain
- NHL draft: Undrafted
- Playing career: 1988–2000

Wayne Robert Cowley (born December 4, 1964) is a Canadian-born British former professional ice hockey goaltender who played in one game in the National Hockey League for the Edmonton Oilers during the 1993–94 season, on December 11, 1993, against the New Jersey Devils. The rest of his career, which lasted from 1988 to 2000, was mainly spent in the minor leagues, though he also played several years in the United Kingdom and Germany. Cowley became a naturalized British citizen and played for the British national team at the 2000 World Championships.

== Career statistics ==
=== Regular season and playoffs ===
			Regular season									Playoffs
Season	Team	League	GP	W	L	T	MIN	GA	SO	GAA	SV%	GP	W	L	MIN	GA	SO	GAA	SV%
1981–82	Streetsville Derbys	COJHL	6	—	—	—	328	24	0	4.39	—	—	—	—	—	—	—	—	—
1982–83	Georgetown Geminis	COJHL	14	—	—	—	836	74	0	5.31	—	—	—	—	—	—	—	—	—
1983–84	Georgetown Geminis	COJHL	37	—	—	—	2170	157	0	4.34	—	—	—	—	—	—	—	—	—
1984–85	Oakville Blades	COJHL	35	—	—	—	2086	132	3	3.80	—	—	—	—	—	—	—	—	—
1985–86	Colgate University	ECAC	7	2	2	0	313	23	1	4.42	—	—	—	—	—	—	—	—	—
1986–87	Colgate University	ECAC	31	21	8	1	1805	106	0	3.52	—	—	—	—	—	—	—	—	—
1987–88	Colgate University	ECAC	20	11	7	1	1162	58	1	2.99	—	—	—	—	—	—	—	—	—
1988–89	Salt Lake Golden Eagles	IHL	29	17	7	1	1423	94	0	3.96	—	2	1	0	69	6	0	5.22	—
1989–90	Salt Lake Golden Eagles	IHL	36	15	12	5	2009	124	1	3.70	—	2	1	0	69	6	0	5.22	—
1990–91	Salt Lake Golden Eagles	IHL	7	3	4	0	377	23	1	3.66	—	—	—	—	—	—	—	—	—
1990–91	Cincinnati Cyclones	ECHL	30	19	9	2	1680	108	1	3.85	.883	4	1	3	249	13	1	3.13	—
1991–92	Blackburn Blackhawks	BD1	2	—	—	—	115	7	0	3.65	—	—	—	—	—	—	—	—	—
1991–92	Raleigh IceCaps	ECHL	38	16	18	2	2213	137	0	3.71	.891	—	—	—	—	—	—	—	—
1991–92	Cape Breton Oilers	AHL	11	6	5	0	644	42	0	3.91	.891	1	0	1	61	3	0	2.95	.909
1992–93	Cape Breton Oilers	AHL	42	14	17	6	2334	152	1	3.91	.878	16	14	2	1014	47	1	2.78	—
1992–93	Wheeling Thunderbirds	ECHL	1	1	0	0	60	3	0	3.00	.880	—	—	—	—	—	—	—	—
1993–94	Edmonton Oilers	NHL	1	0	1	0	58	3	0	3.15	.914	—	—	—	—	—	—	—	—
1993–94	Cape Breton Oilers	AHL	44	20	17	5	2486	150	0	3.62	.878	5	1	4	258	20	0	4.66	—
1994–95	Worcester IceCats	AHL	45	11	25	6	2597	153	1	3.53	.885	—	—	—	—	—	—	—	—
1994–95	Milwaukee Admirals	IHL	2	0	0	1	79	4	0	3.04	.918	—	—	—	—	—	—	—	—
1995–96	Sheffield Steelers	BHL	20	—	—	—	1160	62	—	3.21	.887	7	—	—	420	17	2	2.43	.902
1996–97	Wedemark Scorpions	DEL	43	—	—	—	2324	175	1	4.51	.859	7	—	—	410	30	0	4.39	.870
1997–98	Newcastle Cobras	BISL	28	—	—	—	1612	94	—	3.50	.896	6	—	—	367	20	—	3.27	.901
1998–99	Newcastle Riverkings	BISL	29	—	—	—	1673	87	0	3.12	.888	5	—	—	—	—	—	3.68	.872
1999–00	Flint Generals	UHL	7	6	1	0	419	21	0	3.01	.875	—	—	—	—	—	—	—	—
2003–04	Dundas Real McCoys	MLH	6	—	—	—	—	—	—	—	—	—	—	—	—	—	—	—	—
2004–05	Dundas Real McCoys	MLH	22	—	—	—	—	—	—	—	—	—	—	—	—	—	—	—	—
NHL totals			1	0	1	0	58	3	0	3.15	.914	—	—	—	—	—	—	—	—

=== International ===
Year	Team	Event	GP	W	L	T	MIN	GA	SO	GAA	SV%
2000	Great Britain	WC-B	2	1	0	0	85	6	0	4.22	.824
Senior totals			2	1	0	0	85	6	0	4.22	.824

== See also ==
- List of players who played only one game in the NHL
