= Neil Eisenhut =

Canadian ice hockey player

- Born: February 9, 1967 (age 59) Osoyoos, British Columbia, Canada
- Height: 6 ft 1 in (185 cm)
- Weight: 195 lb (88 kg; 13 st 13 lb)
- Position: Centre
- Shot: Right
- Played for: Vancouver Canucks; Calgary Flames
- NHL draft: 233rd overall, 1987; Vancouver Canucks
- Playing career: 1991–2003

Neil R. Eisenhut (born February 9, 1967) is a Canadian former professional ice hockey player who spent parts of two seasons in the National Hockey League in the mid-1990s.

Eisenhut was born in Osoyoos, British Columbia. He was selected 233rd overall in the 1987 NHL entry draft by the Vancouver Canucks, following which he spent four seasons at the University of North Dakota. At North Dakota, he played alongside a slew of fellow Canuck draft picks (Dixon Ward, Dane Jackson, Garry Valk, and Jason Herter) who would also be future teammates in pro hockey.

Turning pro in 1991, Eisenhut was assigned to the Milwaukee Admirals of the IHL. He would toil in the minors in Vancouver's system for the next three years, earning a positive reputation for his character and leadership, and serving as captain of the Hamilton Canucks. In 1992–93, he had his best minor-league season, recording 22 goals and 40 assists for 62 points with Hamilton. In 1993–94, he finally received a taste of NHL action, recording a goal and 4 points in a 13-game callup to the Canucks.

Eisenhut signed as a free agent with the Calgary Flames for the 1994–95 season, and had another brief NHL stint, appearing in three games for the Flames. After spending two more years in the AHL, primarily with the Binghamton Rangers, Eisenhut signed in Germany in 1997. He would spend a successful six seasons in the DEL with the Krefeld Penguins and DEG Metro Stars before retiring in 2003.

Following his retirement, Eisenhut became a financial advisor and currently works in that position for RBC in Kelowna, BC. He also continued to play senior amateur hockey, helping the Powell River Regals to the Allan Cup in 2006.

== Career statistics ==
=== Regular season and playoffs ===
			Regular season					Playoffs
Season	Team	League	GP	G	A	Pts	PIM	GP	G	A	Pts	PIM
1984–85	Langley Eagles	BCJHL	32	12	15	27	12	—	—	—	—	—
1984–85	Merritt Centennials	BCJHL	17	10	14	24	6	—	—	—	—	—
1985–86	Penticton Knights	BCJHL	13	2	6	8	10	—	—	—	—	—
1986–87	Langley Eagles	BCJHL	43	41	34	75	28	—	—	—	—	—
1987–88	North Dakota Fighting Sioux	WCHA	42	12	20	32	14	—	—	—	—	—
1988–89	North Dakota Fighting Sioux	WCHA	41	22	16	38	26	—	—	—	—	—
1989–90	North Dakota Fighting Sioux	WCHA	45	22	32	54	46	—	—	—	—	—
1990–91	North Dakota Fighting Sioux	WCHA	20	9	15	24	10	—	—	—	—	—
1991–92	Milwaukee Admirals	IHL	76	13	23	36	26	2	1	2	3	0
1992–93	Hamilton Canucks	AHL	72	22	40	62	41	—	—	—	—	—
1993–94	Hamilton Canucks	AHL	60	17	36	53	30	4	1	4	5	0
1993–94	Vancouver Canucks	NHL	13	1	3	4	21	—	—	—	—	—
1994–95	Saint John Flames	AHL	75	16	39	55	30	5	1	1	2	6
1994–95	Calgary Flames	NHL	3	0	0	0	0	—	—	—	—	—
1995–96	Orlando Solar Bears	IHL	59	10	18	28	30	—	—	—	—	—
1995–96	Binghamton Rangers	AHL	10	3	3	6	2	4	3	2	5	0
1996–97	Flint Generals	CoHL	21	10	33	43	20	5	1	4	5	8
1996–97	Binghamton Rangers	AHL	55	25	26	51	16	4	1	2	3	0
1997–98	Krefeld Pinguine	DEL	35	9	8	17	12	10	1	7	8	6
1998–99	Krefeld Pinguine	DEL	46	18	25	43	69	4	1	1	2	8
1999–00	Krefeld Pinguine	DEL	52	10	27	37	46	4	0	2	2	10
2000–01	Krefeld Pinguine	DEL	59	12	16	28	38	—	—	—	—	—
2001–02	Düsseldorfer EG	DEL	48	11	22	33	67	—	—	—	—	—
2002–03	Düsseldorfer EG	DEL	52	6	11	17	26	5	2	0	2	2
NHL totals			16	1	3	4	21	—	—	—	—	—
IHL totals			135	23	41	64	56	2	1	2	3	0
AHL totals			272	83	144	227	119	17	6	9	15	6
DEL totals			292	66	109	175	258	23	4	10	14	26

== Awards and honors ==
Award	Year
WCHA All-Tournament Team	1988
