= Mike Stevens (ice hockey, born 1965) =

Canadian ice hockey player

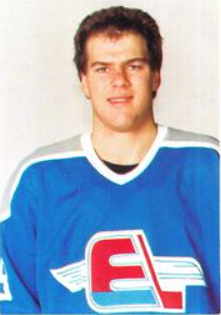
- Stevens in 1985 card
- Born: December 30, 1965 (age 60) Kitchener, Ontario, Canada
- Height: 5 ft 11 in (180 cm)
- Weight: 195 lb (88 kg; 13 st 13 lb)
- Position: Left wing
- Shot: Left
- Played for: Vancouver Canucks; Boston Bruins; New York Islanders; Toronto Maple Leafs
- NHL draft: 58th overall, 1984; Vancouver Canucks
- Playing career: 1984–1990

Michael Stevens (born December 30, 1965) is a Canadian former professional ice hockey winger who played 23 games in the National Hockey League with the Vancouver Canucks, Boston Bruins, New York Islanders, and Toronto Maple Leafs. Stevens spent the bulk of his career in the minor American Hockey League, and also spent time in the International Hockey League and Deutsche Eishockey Liga. He is the younger brother of Scott Stevens, who was also played in the NHL and inducted into the Hockey Hall of Fame.

== Playing career ==
Stevens played his junior hockey with the Kitchener Rangers, the same team as his brother Scott, and was selected 58th overall in the 1984 NHL entry draft by the Vancouver Canucks. While still playing in Kitchener in 1984–85, he received a six-game callup to the Canucks, recording three assists. However, he would have a difficult transition to pro hockey, struggling to produce in two seasons in Vancouver's farm system with the Fredericton Express of the American Hockey League. He recorded over 200 penalty minutes both years.

Prior to the 1986–87, Stevens was sold to the Boston Bruins. He broke through offensively in the AHL scoring 30 goals, and was called up to the Bruins for seven games, recording an assist. He was released by the Bruins after the season and signed with the New York Islanders for the 1987–88 campaign. He would appear in nine games for the Islanders, recording his only NHL goal.

He played one final NHL game for the Toronto Maple Leafs in 1989–90, and played in the minor league systems of the New York Rangers and Calgary Flames during the mid-1990s. His best professional season came in 1992–93, when he recorded 92 points in 68 games for the Binghamton Rangers. In 12 seasons of minor-pro hockey, he recorded 2668 penalty minutes, an average of over 220 per year. He signed at Adler Mannheim 1997, and spent seven seasons there before retiring in 2004.

Stevens appeared in 23 NHL games, recording one goal and four assists for five points.

== Career statistics ==
=== Regular season and playoffs ===
			Regular season					Playoffs
Season	Team	League	GP	G	A	Pts	PIM	GP	G	A	Pts	PIM
1982–83	Kitchener Rangers	OHL	13	0	4	4	16	12	0	1	1	9
1982–83	Kitchener Jr. Rangers	AHMPL	29	5	18	23	86	—	—	—	—	—
1983–84	Kitchener Rangers	OHL	66	19	21	40	109	16	10	7	17	40
1984–85	Kitchener Rangers	OHL	37	17	18	35	121	4	1	1	2	8
1984–85	Vancouver Canucks	NHL	6	0	3	3	6	—	—	—	—	—
1985–86	Fredericton Express	AHL	79	12	19	31	208	6	1	1	2	35
1986–87	Fredericton Express	AHL	71	7	18	25	258	—	—	—	—	—
1987–88	Boston Bruins	NHL	7	0	1	1	9	—	—	—	—	—
1987–88	Maine Mariners	AHL	63	30	25	55	265	7	1	2	3	37
1988–89	New York Islanders	NHL	9	1	0	1	14	—	—	—	—	—
1988–89	Springfield Indians	AHL	42	17	13	30	120	—	—	—	—	—
1989–90	Springfield Indians	AHL	28	12	10	22	75	—	—	—	—	—
1989–90	Toronto Maple Leafs	NHL	1	0	0	0	0	—	—	—	—	—
1989–90	Newmarket Saints	AHL	46	16	28	44	86	—	—	—	—	—
1990–91	Newmarket Saints	AHL	68	24	23	47	229	—	—	—	—	—
1991–92	St. John's Maple Leafs	AHL	30	13	11	24	65	—	—	—	—	—
1991–92	Binghamton Rangers	AHL	44	15	15	30	87	11	7	6	13	45
1992–93	Binghamton Rangers	AHL	68	31	61	92	230	14	5	5	10	63
1993–94	Saint John Flames	AHL	79	20	37	57	293	6	1	3	4	34
1994–95	Cincinnati Cyclones	IHL	80	34	43	77	274	10	6	3	9	16
1995–96	Cleveland Lumberjacks	IHL	81	31	43	74	252	3	1	0	1	8
1996–97	Cleveland Lumberjacks	IHL	6	1	4	5	32	—	—	—	—	—
1996–97	Manitoba Moose	IHL	22	8	4	12	54	—	—	—	—	—
1996–97	Cincinnati Cyclones	IHL	46	16	18	34	140	3	0	2	2	8
1997–98	SERC Wild Wings	DEL	44	16	28	44	169	7	3	4	7	30
1998–99	Adler Mannheim	DEL	44	8	13	21	233	11	4	4	8	49
1999–00	Adler Mannheim	DEL	48	17	16	33	126	5	1	0	1	42
2000–01	Adler Mannheim	DEL	56	11	12	23	185	10	3	7	10	69
2001–02	Adler Mannheim	DEL	56	16	15	31	228	12	1	6	7	48
2002–03	Hamburg Freezers	DEL	50	13	13	26	150	3	0	0	0	8
2003–04	ERC Ingolstadt	DEL	26	2	4	6	44	9	1	1	2	20
AHL totals			618	197	260	457	1916	44	15	17	32	214
NHL totals			23	1	4	5	29	—	—	—	—	—
