= David Haas (ice hockey) =

Canadian ice hockey player

- Born: June 23, 1968 (age 57) Toronto, Ontario, Canada
- Height: 6 ft 2 in (188 cm)
- Weight: 196 lb (89 kg; 14 st 0 lb)
- Position: Left wing
- Shot: Left
- Played for: NHL; Edmonton Oilers; Calgary Flames; AHL; Cape Breton Oilers; New Haven Nighthawks; Saint John Flames; Worcester IceCats; IHL; Phoenix Roadrunners; Detroit Vipers; Europe; HC Courmaosta (Serie A); Olimpija Ljubljana (Slovenia); HC Milano (Serie A); Hannover Scorpions (DEL)
- NHL draft: 105th overall, 1986; Edmonton Oilers
- Playing career: 1988–2004

David Haas (born June 23, 1968) is a Canadian former professional ice hockey player.

== Playing career ==
As a youth, Haas played in the 1981 Quebec International Pee-Wee Hockey Tournament with the Toronto Marlboros minor ice hockey team from.

Drafted 105th overall by the Edmonton Oilers in the 1986 NHL entry draft, Haas played five games for the Oilers during the 1990–91 NHL season, scoring one goal. He spent most of his tenure with their American Hockey League affiliate the Cape Breton Oilers. He also played for the New Haven Nighthawks during 1991–92. In 1993, he signed with the Calgary Flames as a free agent, but he would only play two further NHL games, scoring one goal and one assist, again spending most of his time in the minor pro leagues.

=== Europe ===
It was in 1994 that Haas began his European adventure, playing in Italy with HC Courmaosta where he stayed for one season. After that, he was off for Slovenia to play for Olimpija Ljubljana, where he spent three seasons and became a core player with the club, scoring 49 goals in the 1995–96 season and 85 points the next season. After a brief return to Italy with HC Milano, his next stop was Germany's Deutsche Eishockey Liga where he spent five seasons with the Hannover Scorpions where he had a stellar career, frequently ranking as one of the team's top points scorer.

=== Retirement ===
After a brief return to America for the Fresno Falcons of the West Coast Hockey League, he spent one season in Hannover. However, his numbers were less productive compared to previous seasons. David Haas officially retired in 2004.

== Career statistics ==
			Regular season					Playoffs
Season	Team	League	GP	G	A	Pts	PIM	GP	G	A	Pts	PIM
1985–86	London Knights	OHL	62	4	13	17	91	5	0	1	1	0
1986–87	London Knights	OHL	5	1	0	1	5	—	—	—	—	—
1986–87	Kitchener Rangers	OHL	4	0	1	1	4	—	—	—	—	—
1986–87	Belleville Bulls	OHL	55	10	13	23	86	6	3	0	3	13
1987–88	Belleville Bulls	OHL	5	1	1	2	9	—	—	—	—	—
1987–88	Windsor Compuware Spitfires	OHL	58	59	46	105	237	11	9	11	20	50
1988–89	Cape Breton Oilers	AHL	61	9	9	18	325	—	—	—	—	—
1989–90	Cape Breton Oilers	AHL	53	6	12	18	230	4	2	2	4	15
1990–91	Edmonton Oilers	NHL	5	1	0	1	0	—	—	—	—	—
1990–91	Cape Breton Oilers	AHL	60	24	23	47	137	3	0	2	2	12
1991–92	Cape Breton Oilers	AHL	16	3	7	10	32	—	—	—	—	—
1991–92	New Haven Nighthawks	AHL	50	13	23	36	97	5	3	0	3	13
1992–93	Cape Breton Oilers	AHL	73	22	56	78	121	16	11	13	24	36
1993–94	Calgary Flames	NHL	2	1	1	2	7	—	—	—	—	—
1993–94	Saint John Flames	AHL	37	11	17	28	108	—	—	—	—	—
1993–94	Phoenix Roadrunners	IHL	11	7	4	11	43	—	—	—	—	—
1994–95	HC Lions Courmaosta	Italy	16	9	15	24	50	6	5	5	10	14
1994–95	Detroit Vipers	IHL	1	0	1	1	0	—	—	—	—	—
1994–95	Worcester IceCats	AHL	28	11	10	21	88	—	—	—	—	—
1995–96	Olimpija Ljubljana	Alpenliga	13	9	4	13	24	—	—	—	—	—
1995–96	Olimpija Ljubljana	Slovenia	36	49	26	75	84	—	—	—	—	—
1996–97	Olimpija Ljubljana	Alpenliga	40	29	46	75	83	5	9	1	10	5
1996–97	HC 24 Milan	Italy	4	6	5	11	31	6	3	3	6	24
1997–98	Hannover Scorpions	DEL	40	16	26	42	120	9	9	2	11	20
1998–99	Hannover Scorpions	DEL	42	18	20	38	104	—	—	—	—	—
1999–00	Hannover Scorpions	DEL	40	12	19	31	106	—	—	—	—	—
2000–01	Hannover Scorpions	DEL	34	14	9	23	115	6	2	2	4	26
2001–02	Hannover Scorpions	DEL	55	17	24	41	80	—	—	—	—	—
2002–03	Fresno Falcons	WCHL	10	6	1	7	34	8	0	3	3	28
2003–04	Hannover Scorpions	DEL	42	7	13	20	80	5	2	1	3	18
NHL totals			7	2	1	3	7	—	—	—	—	—
AHL totals			378	99	157	256	1,138	28	16	17	33	76
DEL totals			253	84	111	195	605	20	13	5	18	64
