= List of Philadelphia Flyers players =

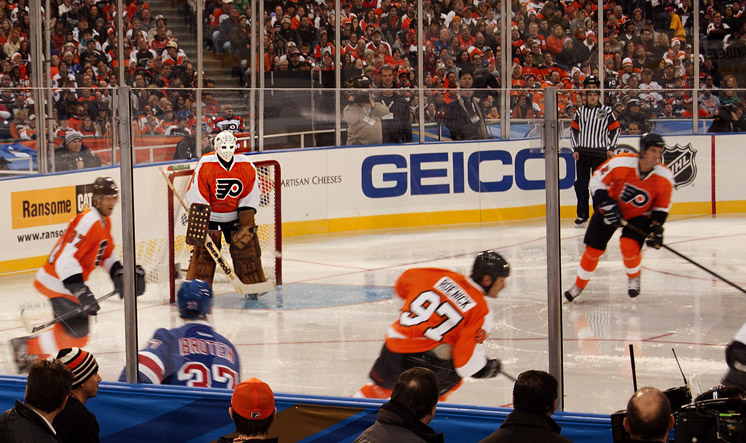
Eric Desjardins (left), Bernie Parent (in goal), Jeremy Roenick (97) and Derian Hatcher (far right) playing for the Flyers during the 2012 Winter Classic Alumni Game.

The Philadelphia Flyers are a professional ice hockey team based in Philadelphia, Pennsylvania. They are members of the Metropolitan Division of the National Hockey League's (NHL) Eastern Conference. The Flyers were founded in 1967 as one of six expansion teams, increasing the size of the NHL at that time to 12 teams.

Since the franchise was established, the team has had 20 captains, including Bobby Clarke, who captained the Flyers to two Stanley Cups in 1973–74 and 1974–75, and is the only player to have scored over 1,000 points for the Flyers. Clarke was awarded the Hart Memorial Trophy as the NHL's most valuable player three times, and was inducted into the Hockey Hall of Fame in 1987. Thirteen other players who have appeared for the Flyers have been inducted into the Hockey Hall of Fame: Bill Barber, Paul Coffey, Peter Forsberg, Dale Hawerchuk, Mark Howe, Eric Lindros, Adam Oates, Bernie Parent, Chris Pronger, Mark Recchi, Jeremy Roenick, Darryl Sittler and Allan Stanley. Six players have been honored by having their number retired by the Flyers: Barber, Clarke, Howe, Lindros, Parent and Barry Ashbee. Thirty people have been inducted into the Flyers Hall of Fame since its establishment in 1988, of which twenty-five have been players.

In addition to leading the team in points both in the regular season and playoffs, Clarke also holds the records for the most appearances and most assists for the Flyers in both regular season and playoffs. Fellow Stanley Cup winner Barber has scored the most goals for the team with his 420 regular season and 53 playoff goals. Rick Tocchet spent the most time in the penalty box during the regular season for the Flyers, accruing 1,817 minutes in total, while Dave Schultz's 363 penalty minutes are the most by a Flyer in the playoffs. Among goaltenders, Roman Cechmanek boasts the best goals against average and save percentage in the regular season (excluding Marc D'Amour and Robbie Moore, neither of whom made more than five appearances).

As of the completion of the 2025–26 NHL season, 67 goaltenders and 648 skaters (forwards and defensemen) have appeared in at least one regular season or playoff game with the Philadelphia Flyers since the team joined the league in the 1967–68 NHL season. The Flyers won the Stanley Cup in 1974 and 1975 with a total of 26 players. Seventeen of them were part of both Stanley Cup winning rosters. The 715 all-time members of the Flyers are listed below, with statistics complete through the end of the 2025–26 season.

== Key ==
- † Won a Stanley Cup with the Flyers
- ‡ Appeared in a Flyers game during the most recently completed season

General abbreviations
Abbreviation	Definition
GP	Games played
Tot	Total number of seasons
HHOF	Inducted into the Hockey Hall of Fame as a player
SC	Won the Stanley Cup with the team, followed by year(s) won
Ret	Uniform number retired by the team
FHOF	Inducted into the Flyers Hall of Fame

Goaltender statistical abbreviations
Abbreviation	Definition
W	Wins
L	Losses
T (Note: Beginning in the 2005–06 season, ties are no longer possible. At the same time, the league began tracking overtime losses for goaltenders.)	Ties
OT	Overtime loss
SO	Shutouts
GAA	Goals against average
SV% (Note: Save percentage did not become an official NHL statistic until the 1982–83 season. Therefore, goaltenders who played before 1982 do not have official save percentages. The unofficial save percentages of goaltenders who played for the team before 1982 are according to the Flyers History website.)	Save percentage

Skater statistical abbreviations
Abbreviation	Definition
Pos	Position
G	Goals
A	Assists
P	Points
PIM	Penalty minutes
D	Defense
LW	Left wing
C	Center
RW	Right wing

Statistics are complete to the end of the 2025–26 NHL season.

== Goaltenders ==
Goaltenders who have played for the Philadelphia Flyers
Name	Nat (Note: The nationality column lists the player's national team or country of birth if the player has never competed internationally. The player's national team is listed if it differs from their country of birth. For example, Mike Knuble was born in Canada but played for the United States internationally. His nationality is listed as United States.)	Tot	Seasons (Note: The seasons column lists the first year of the season of the player's first game and the last year of the season of the player's last game. For example, a player who played one game in the 1999–2000 season would be listed as playing with the team from 1999–2000, regardless of what calendar year the game occurred within.)	Regular season								Playoffs						Notes
Name	Nat	Tot	Seasons	GP	W	L	T	OT	SO	GAA	SV%	GP	W	L	SO	GAA	SV%	Notes
Johan Backlund	(Sweden)	1	2009–2010	1	0	1	–	0	0	3.00	.917	1	0	0	0	0.00	–	
Stephane Beauregard	(Canada)	1	1992–1993	16	3	9	0	–	0	4.41	.854	–	–	–	–	–	–	
Michel Belhumeur	(Canada)	1	1972–1973	23	9	7	3	–	0	3.23	.903	1	0	0	0	5.94	.889	
Martin Biron	(Canada)	3	2006–2009	133	65	47	–	16	7	2.71	.915	23	11	12	2	2.87	.908	
Sergei Bobrovsky	(Russia)	2	2010–2012	83	42	23	–	10	0	2.73	.909	7	0	2	0	4.04	.848	
Brian Boucher	(United States)	6	1999–2002; 2009–2011; 2012–2013	174	73	68	12	7	8	2.50	.904	42	21	18	2	2.37	.911	
Ilya Bryzgalov	(Russia)	2	2011–2013	99	52	33	–	10	7	2.60	.905	11	5	6	0	3.46	.887	
Sean Burke	(Canada)	2	1997–1998; 2003–2004	26	13	8	2	–	2	2.55	.911	6	1	4	0	3.34	.862	
Roman Cechmanek	(Czech Republic)	3	2000–2003	163	92	43	22	–	20	1.96	.923	23	9	14	3	2.33	.909	
Frederic Chabot	(Canada)	1	1993–1994	4	0	1	1	–	0	4.26	.875	–	–	–	–	–	–	
Marc D'Amour	(Canada)	1	1988–1989	1	0	0	0	–	0	0.00	1.000	–	–	–	–	–	–	
Jeremy Duchesne	(United States)	1	2009–2010	1	0	0	–	0	0	3.59	.750	–	–	–	–	–	–	
Brian Elliott	(Canada)	4	2017–2021	130	65	38	–	14	6	2.86	.902	7	2	4	0	3.60	.876	
Ray Emery	(Canada)	3	2009–2010; 2013–2015	88	35	34	–	10	5	2.88	.901	3	1	2	0	3.49	.888	
Samuel Ersson‡	(Sweden)	4	2022–2026	143	65	50	–	17	7	3.01	.884	–	–	–	–	–	–	
Robert Esche	(United States)	4	2002–2007	132	60	40	10	6	7	2.65	.901	24	13	11	1	2.73	.907	
Doug Favell	(Canada)	6	1967–1973	215	77	87	37	–	16	2.79	.917	16	6	10	1	3.11	.903	
Ivan Fedotov	(Russia)	2	2023–2025	29	6	14	–	5	0	3.29	.874	–	–	–	–	–	–	
Bob Froese	(Canada)	5	1982–1987	144	92	29	12	–	12	2.74	.899	12	2	6	0	3.77	.864	
Bruce Gamble	(Canada)	2	1970–1972	35	10	14	4	–	2	3.09	.908	2	0	2	0	6.00	.821	
Jeff Hackett	(Canada)	1	2003–2004	27	10	10	6	–	3	2.39	.905	–	–	–	–	–	–	
Carter Hart	(Canada)	6	2018–2024	227	96	93	–	29	6	2.94	.906	14	9	5	2	2.23	.926	
Cal Heeter	(United States)	1	2013–2014	1	0	0	–	1	0	4.69	.868	–	–	–	–	–	–	
Ron Hextall	(Canada)	11	1986–1992; 1994–1999	489	240	172	58	–	18	2.91	.895	84	45	36	2	2.95	.898	FHOF – 2008
Bruce Hoffort	(Canada)	2	1989–1991	9	4	0	3	–	0	3.59	.877	–	–	–	–	–	–	
Martin Houle	(Canada)	1	2006–2007	1	0	0	–	0	0	27.27	.667	–	–	–	–	–	–	
Gary Inness	(Canada)	2	1975–1977	8	3	0	2	–	0	2.18	.919	–	–	–	–	–	–	
Darren Jensen	(Canada)	2	1984–1986	30	15	10	1	–	2	3.82	.879	–	–	–	–	–	–	
Martin Jones	(Canada)	1	2021–2022	35	12	18	–	3	0	3.42	.900	–	–	–	–	–	–	
Aleksei Kolosov‡	(Belarus)	2	2024–2026	21	5	11	–	1	0	3.64	.863	–	–	–	–	–	–	
Mark Laforest	(Canada)	2	1987–1989	38	10	16	4	–	1	3.91	.873	2	1	0	0	1.25	.917	
Michel Larocque	(Canada)	1	1982–1983	2	0	1	1	–	0	4.00	.857	–	–	–	–	–	–	
Michael Leighton	(Canada)	4	2006–2007; 2009–2011; 2012–2013	33	19	8	–	2	1	2.76	.910	16	8	4	3	2.54	.913	
Pelle Lindbergh	(Sweden)	5	1981–1986	157	87	49	15	–	7	3.31	.887	23	12	10	3	3.13	.892	
Neil Little	(Canada)	2	2001–2002; 2003–2004	2	0	2	0	–	0	3.86	.838	–	–	–	–	–	–	
Alex Lyon	(United States)	4	2017–2021	22	6	7	–	2	0	3.21	.893	–	–	–	–	–	–	
Steve Mason	(Canada)	5	2012–2017	231	104	78	–	36	14	2.47	.918	8	2	5	0	2.86	.906	
Mike McKenna	(United States)	1	2018–2019	1	0	1	–	0	0	4.22	.833	–	–	–	–	–	–	
Don McLeod	(Canada)	1	1971–1972	4	0	3	1	–	0	4.65	.872	–	–	–	–	–	–	
Robbie Moore	(Canada)	1	1978–1979	5	3	0	1	–	2	1.77	.927	5	3	2	0	4.06	.854	
Jerome Mrazek	(Canada)	1	1975–1976	1	0	0	0	–	0	9.55	.500	–	–	–	–	–	–	
Petr Mrazek	(Czech Republic)	1	2017–2018	17	6	6	–	3	1	3.22	.891	1	0	0	0	3.87	.857	
Phil Myre	(Canada)	2	1979–1981	57	24	12	19	–	0	3.72	.872	6	5	1	1	2.50	.920	
Michal Neuvirth	(Czech Republic)	4	2015–2019	89	39	30	–	9	4	2.66	.908	6	3	2	1	2.38	.927	
Antero Niittymaki	(Finland)	5	2003–2009	161	62	61	0	23	4	3.01	.901	2	0	0	0	4.13	.828	
Maxime Ouellet	(Canada)	1	2000–2001	2	0	1	0	–	0	2.38	.889	–	–	–	–	–	–	
Bernie Parent†	(Canada)	10	1967–1971; 1973–1979	486	231	141	102	–	50	2.43	.917	63	35	28	6	2.39	.916	SC: 1974, 1975; Ret # 1 – 1979; HHOF – 1984; FHOF – 1988
Pete Peeters	(Canada)	6	1978–1982; 1989–1991	179	85	57	20	–	5	3.20	.888	20	11	8	1	3.31	.880	
Jean-Marc Pelletier	(United States)	1	1998–1999	1	0	1	0	–	0	5.00	.828	–	–	–	–	–	–	
Cal Petersen	(United States)	1	2023–2024	5	2	2	–	0	0	3.90	.864	–	–	–	–	–	–	
Calvin Pickard	(Canada)	1	2018–2019	11	4	2	–	2	1	4.01	.863	–	–	–	–	–	–	
Glenn Resch	(Canada)	2	1985–1987	22	7	7	2	–	0	2.97	.900	3	0	0	0	3.16	.833	
Dominic Roussel	(Canada)	5	1991–1996	139	62	49	14	–	5	3.18	.895	1	0	0	0	0.00	1.000	
Felix Sandstrom	(Sweden)	3	2021–2024	30	4	18	–	4	0	3.66	.880	–	–	–	–	–	–	
Garth Snow	(United States)	3	1995–1998	90	40	25	16	–	3	2.59	.900	13	8	4	0	2.83	.892	
Tommy Soderstrom	(Sweden)	2	1992–1994	78	26	35	10	–	7	3.66	.881	–	–	–	–	–	–	
Rick St. Croix	(Canada)	6	1977–1983	82	38	26	16	–	2	3.24	.886	10	4	6	1	3.02	.891	
Wayne Stephenson†	(Canada)	5	1974–1979	165	93	35	23	–	10	2.77	.897	23	10	10	2	2.89	.893	SC: 1975
Anthony Stolarz	(United States)	2	2016–2017; 2018–2019	19	6	4	–	4	2	2.86	.911	–	–	–	–	–	–	
Cam Talbot	(Canada)	1	2018–2019	4	1	2	–	0	0	3.70	.881	–	–	–	–	–	–	
Bobby Taylor†	(Canada)	5	1971–1976	43	15	16	7	–	0	4.06	.885	–	–	–	–	–	–	SC: 1974, 1975
John Vanbiesbrouck	(United States)	2	1998–2000	112	52	33	24	–	9	2.19	.904	6	2	4	1	1.46	.938	
Daniel Vladar‡	(Czech Republic)	1	2025–2026	52	29	14	–	7	0	2.42	.906	10	4	6	2	2.18	.922	
Dunc Wilson	(Canada)	1	1969–1970	1	0	1	0	–	0	3.02	.885	–	–	–	–	–	–	
Ken Wregget	(Canada)	4	1988–1992	107	42	47	9	–	0	3.55	.879	5	2	2	0	2.23	.928	
Wendell Young	(Canada)	1	1987–1988	6	3	2	0	–	0	3.76	.865	–	–	–	–	–	–	
Rob Zepp	(Germany)	1	2014–2015	10	5	2	–	0	0	2.89	.888	–	–	–	–	–	–	

== Skaters ==
Skaters who have played for the Philadelphia Flyers
Name	Nat	Pos	Tot	Seasons	Regular season					Playoffs					Notes
Name	Nat	Pos	Tot	Seasons	GP	G	A	P	PIM	GP	G	A	P	PIM	Notes
Rodrigo Abols‡	(Latvia)	C	2	2024–2026	64	5	10	15	26	–	–	–	–	–	
Keith Acton	(Canada)	C	5	1988–1993	303	45	72	117	412	16	2	3	5	18	
Greg Adams	(Canada)	LW	2	1980–1982	39	7	15	22	113	–	–	–	–	–	
Dmitry Afanasenkov	(Russia)	LW	1	2006–2007	41	8	7	15	12	–	–	–	–	–	
Jason Akeson	(Canada)	RW	3	2012–2015	15	1	1	2	8	7	2	1	3	4	
Andrew Alberts	(United States)	D	1	2008–2009	79	1	12	13	61	6	0	1	1	10	
Ray Allison	(Canada)	RW	5	1981–1985; 1986–1987	167	47	81	128	210	10	2	2	4	20	
Wade Allison	(Canada)	RW	3	2020–2023	75	13	9	22	40	–	–	–	–	–	
Mark Alt	(United States)	D	2	2014–2015; 2017–2018	9	0	0	0	2	–	–	–	–	–	
Tony Amonte	(United States)	RW	2	2002–2004	93	27	41	68	40	31	4	11	15	10	
Shawn Anderson	(Canada)	D	1	1994–1995	1	0	0	0	0	–	–	–	–	–	
Mikael Andersson	(Sweden)	LW	2	1998–2000	43	2	4	6	0	6	0	1	1	2	
Emil Andrae‡	(Sweden)	D	3	2023–2026	107	3	17	20	38	4	0	1	1	4	
Andy Andreoff	(Canada)	LW	2	2019–2021	20	0	1	1	11	–	–	–	–	–	
Lou Angotti	(Canada)	C	1	1967–1968	70	12	37	49	35	7	0	0	0	2	Captain: 1967–1968
Shawn Antoski	(Canada)	LW	2	1994–1996	89	1	3	4	265	20	1	2	3	38	
Bill Armstrong	(Canada)	LW	1	1990–1991	1	0	1	1	0	–	–	–	–	–	
Fred Arthur	(Canada)	D	2	1981–1983	77	1	8	9	49	4	0	0	0	2	
Arron Asham	(Canada)	RW	2	2008–2010	150	18	26	44	281	29	5	4	9	16	
Barry Ashbee†	(Canada)	D	4	1970–1974	270	15	67	82	277	17	0	4	4	22	SC: 1974; Ret # 4 – 1977; FHOF – 1991
Cam Atkinson	(United States)	RW	2	2021–2022; 2023–2024	143	36	42	78	37	–	–	–	–	–	
Ronnie Attard	(United States)	D	3	2021–2024	29	2	4	6	14	–	–	–	–	–	
Nicolas Aube-Kubel	(Canada)	RW	4	2018–2022	102	10	18	28	69	13	2	1	3	8	
Dave Babych	(Canada)	D	2	1997–1999	39	2	4	6	32	5	1	0	1	4	
Justin Bailey	(United States)	RW	1	2018–2019	11	0	1	1	2	–	–	–	–	–	
Reid Bailey	(Canada)	D	2	1980–1982	27	1	3	4	78	14	0	2	2	23	
Terry Ball	(Canada)	D	2	1967–1968; 1969–1970	62	7	18	25	20	–	–	–	–	–	
Bill Barber†	(Canada)	LW	12	1972–1984	903	420	463	883	623	129	53	55	108	109	SC: 1974, 1975; Captain: 1981–1983; FHOF – 1989; Ret # 7 – 1990; HHOF – 1990
Denver Barkey‡	(Canada)	C	1	2025–2026	43	5	12	17	16	10	1	1	2	4	
Norm Barnes	(Canada)	D	4	1976–1977; 1978–1981	82	4	24	28	77	12	0	0	0	8	
Murray Baron	(Canada)	D	2	1989–1991	83	10	10	20	86	–	–	–	–	–	
Len Barrie	(Canada)	C	2	1989–1990; 1992–1993	9	2	2	4	9	–	–	–	–	–	
Oskars Bartulis	(Latvia)	D	2	2009–2011	66	1	8	9	32	7	0	0	0	4	
Ryan Bast	(Canada)	D	1	1998–1999	2	0	1	1	0	–	–	–	–	–	
Frank Bathe	(Canada)	D	7	1977–1984	198	3	24	27	502	27	1	3	4	42	
Nolan Baumgartner	(Canada)	D	1	2006–2007	6	0	1	1	21	–	–	–	–	–	
Pierre-Edouard Bellemare	(France)	LW	3	2014–2017	237	17	17	34	65	5	0	1	1	15	
Kieffer Bellows	(United States)	LW	1	2022–2023	27	3	0	3	6	–	–	–	–	–	
Louis Belpedio	(United States)	D	1	2023–2024	12	2	2	4	0	–	–	–	–	–	
Harvey Bennett	(United States)	C	2	1976–1978	53	13	8	21	67	4	0	0	0	2	
Brian Benning	(Canada)	D	2	1991–1993	59	11	29	40	128	–	–	–	–	–	
Josef Beranek	(Czech Republic)	LW	3	1992–1995	134	46	38	84	137	–	–	–	–	–	
Todd Bergen	(Canada)	C	1	1984–1985	14	11	5	16	4	17	4	9	13	8	
Bo Berglund	(Sweden)	RW	1	1985–1986	7	0	2	2	4	–	–	–	–	–	
Serge Bernier	(Canada)	C	4	1968–1972	123	35	40	75	130	4	1	1	2	0	
Craig Berube	(Canada)	LW	7	1986–1991; 1998–2000	323	20	34	54	1138	45	2	0	2	100	
Blair Betts	(Canada)	C	2	2009–2011	138	13	17	30	22	34	1	1	2	4	
Don Biggs	(Canada)	C	1	1989–1990	11	2	0	2	8	–	–	–	–	–	
Don Blackburn	(Canada)	LW	2	1967–1969	115	16	29	45	59	11	3	0	3	10	
Tom Bladon†	(Canada)	D	6	1972–1978	463	67	163	230	281	78	8	24	32	68	SC: 1974, 1975
Claude Boivin	(Canada)	LW	3	1991–1994	114	11	18	29	320	–	–	–	–	–	
Mike Boland	(Canada)	D	1	1974–1975	2	0	0	0	0	–	–	–	–	–	
Oliver Bonk‡	(Canada)	D	1	2025–2026	1	1	1	2	0	1	0	0	0	0	
Mark Botell	(Canada)	D	1	1981–1982	32	4	10	14	31	–	–	–	–	–	
Jesse Boulerice	(United States)	RW	2	2001–2002; 2007–2008	8	0	0	0	34	–	–	–	–	–	
Marc-Andre Bourdon	(Canada)	D	1	2011–2012	45	4	3	7	52	1	0	0	0	0	
Jason Bowen	(Canada)	D	5	1992–1997	73	2	6	8	99	–	–	–	–	–	
Nick Boynton	(Canada)	D	1	2010–2011	10	0	0	0	4	–	–	–	–	–	
Donald Brashear	(United States)	LW	4	2001–2006	270	22	44	66	648	37	2	5	7	101	
Derick Brassard	(Canada)	C	1	2021–2022	31	6	10	16	10	–	–	–	–	–	
Justin Braun	(United States)	D	4	2019–2023	227	9	34	43	91	16	0	2	2	2	
Pavel Brendl	(Czech Republic)	RW	2	2001–2003	50	6	7	13	6	2	0	0	0	0	
Andy Brickley	(United States)	LW	1	1982–1983	3	1	1	2	0	–	–	–	–	–	
Mel Bridgman	(Canada)	C	7	1975–1982	462	119	205	324	971	74	13	30	43	201	Captain: 1979–1981
Danny Briere	(Canada)	C	6	2007–2013	364	124	159	283	331	68	37	35	72	64	
Aris Brimanis	(United States)	D	3	1993–1994; 1995–1997	21	0	3	3	12	–	–	–	–	–	
Rod Brind'Amour	(Canada)	C	9	1991–2000	633	235	366	601	563	57	24	27	51	31	FHOF – 2015
Bobby Brink‡	(United States)	RW	4	2021–2022; 2023–2026	201	36	58	94	52	–	–	–	–	–	
Willie Brossart	(Canada)	D	3	1970–1973	47	0	5	5	12	–	–	–	–	–	
Dave Brown	(Canada)	RW	11	1982–1989; 1991–1995	552	39	39	78	1382	54	2	2	4	173	
Larry Brown	(Canada)	D	1	1971–1972	12	0	0	0	2	–	–	–	–	–	
Patrick Brown	(United States)	C	2	2021–2023	87	6	10	16	28	–	–	–	–	–	
Mike Bullard	(Canada)	C	2	1988–1990	124	50	63	113	127	19	3	9	12	32	
Alex Bump‡	(United States)	LW	1	2025–2026	17	5	4	9	2	6	2	0	2	0	
Connor Bunnaman	(Canada)	C	3	2019–2022	54	1	2	3	8	4	0	0	0	2	
Marc Bureau	(Canada)	C	2	1998–2000	125	6	8	14	20	6	0	2	2	2	
Adam Burt	(United States)	D	2	1998–2000	84	1	7	8	59	17	0	1	1	8	
Mike Busniuk	(Canada)	D	2	1979–1981	143	3	23	26	297	25	2	5	7	34	
Vyacheslav Butsayev	(Russia)	C	2	1992–1994	99	14	23	37	119	–	–	–	–	–	
Mike Byers	(Canada)	RW	1	1968–1969	5	0	2	2	0	4	0	1	1	0	
Kyle Calder	(Canada)	LW	1	2006–2007	59	9	12	21	36	–	–	–	–	–	
Drew Callander	(Canada)	RW	3	1976–1979	18	3	1	4	5	–	–	–	–	–	
Daniel Carcillo	(Canada)	LW	3	2008–2011	153	16	16	32	414	33	5	6	11	69	
Terry Carkner	(Canada)	D	5	1988–1993	376	29	103	132	867	19	1	5	6	28	
Matt Carle	(United States)	D	4	2008–2012	308	15	122	137	91	51	3	23	26	20	
Dwight Carruthers	(Canada)	D	1	1967–1968	1	0	0	0	0	–	–	–	–	–	
Lindsay Carson	(Canada)	LW	7	1981–1988	346	61	76	137	495	44	3	8	11	56	
Jeff Carter	(Canada)	C	6	2005–2011	461	181	162	343	288	47	13	8	21	34	
Jackson Cates	(United States)	C	3	2020–2023	20	1	1	2	0	–	–	–	–	–	
Noah Cates‡	(United States)	LW	5	2021–2026	317	58	91	149	74	8	1	3	4	0	
Dick Cherry	(Canada)	D	2	1968–1970	139	12	10	22	41	4	1	0	1	4	
Eric Chouinard	(United States)	RW	3	2002–2006	46	7	4	11	10	–	–	–	–	–	
Jeff Chychrun	(Canada)	D	5	1986–1991	199	3	17	20	608	19	0	2	2	65	
Bobby Clarke†	(Canada)	C	15	1969–1984	1144	358	852	1210	1453	136	42	77	119	152	Captain: 1973–1979; SC: 1974, 1975; Captain: 1983–1984; Ret # 16 – 1984; HHOF – 1987; FHOF – 1988
Bill Clement†	(Canada)	C	4	1971–1975	229	53	52	105	166	18	2	0	2	12	SC: 1974, 1975
Braydon Coburn	(Canada)	D	9	2006–2015	576	37	124	161	470	72	2	21	23	61	
Glen Cochrane	(Canada)	D	6	1978–1979; 1980–1985	257	16	61	77	1110	11	1	1	2	24	
Paul Coffey	(Canada)	D	2	1996–1998	94	8	47	55	50	17	1	8	9	6	HHOF – 2004
Carlo Colaiacovo	(Canada)	D	1	2014–2015	33	2	6	8	10	–	–	–	–	–	
Bill Collins	(Canada)	RW	1	1976–1977	9	1	1	2	4	–	–	–	–	–	
Mike Comrie	(Canada)	C	1	2003–2004	21	4	5	9	12	–	–	–	–	–	
Kevin Connauton	(Canada)	D	1	2021–2022	26	1	2	3	2	–	–	–	–	–	
Al Conroy	(Canada)	RW	3	1991–1994	114	9	14	23	156	–	–	–	–	–	
Bob Corkum	(United States)	C	1	1995–1996	28	4	3	7	8	12	1	2	3	6	
Riley Cote	(Canada)	LW	4	2006–2010	156	1	6	7	411	3	0	0	0	0	
Nick Cousins	(Canada)	C	3	2014–2017	107	12	15	27	37	6	0	0	0	2	
Sean Couturier‡	(Canada)	C	14	2011–2022; 2023–2026	952	218	361	579	377	49	11	15	26	34	Captain: 2024–present
Bruce Cowick†	(Canada)	LW	1	1973–1974	–	–	–	–	–	8	0	0	0	9	SC: 1974
Murray Craven	(Canada)	LW	8	1984–1992	523	152	272	424	315	44	9	15	24	28	
Terry Crisp†	(Canada)	C	5	1972–1977	194	25	54	79	78	47	7	13	20	8	SC: 1974, 1975
Shawn Cronin	(United States)	D	1	1992–1993	35	2	1	3	37	–	–	–	–	–	
Doug Crossman	(Canada)	D	5	1983–1988	392	35	158	193	255	60	9	22	31	81	
Phil Crowe	(Canada)	D	1	1995–1996	16	1	1	2	28	–	–	–	–	–	
Mark Cullen	(United States)	C	1	2006–2007	3	0	0	0	0	–	–	–	–	–	
Jim Cummins	(United States)	RW	1	1993–1994	22	1	2	3	71	–	–	–	–	–	
Jim Cunningham	(United States)	LW	1	1977–1978	1	0	0	0	4	–	–	–	–	–	
Alexandre Daigle	(Canada)	C	2	1997–1999	68	12	19	31	8	5	0	2	2	0	
J. J. Daigneault	(Canada)	D	2	1986–1988	105	8	18	26	68	9	1	0	1	0	
Bob Dailey	(Canada)	D	6	1976–1982	304	56	138	194	397	56	10	30	40	91	
Rod Dallman	(Canada)	LW	1	1991–1992	2	0	0	0	5	–	–	–	–	–	
Kimbi Daniels	(Canada)	C	2	1990–1992	27	1	2	3	4	–	–	–	–	–	
Scott Daniels	(Canada)	LW	1	1996–1997	56	5	3	8	237	–	–	–	–	–	
Craig Darby	(United States)	C	2	1996–1998	12	2	4	6	2	–	–	–	–	–	
Barry Dean	(Canada)	LW	2	1977–1979	86	11	31	42	54	–	–	–	–	–	
Tony DeAngelo	(United States)	D	1	2022–2023	70	11	31	42	73	–	–	–	–	–	
Michael Del Zotto	(Canada)	D	3	2014–2017	167	20	43	63	78	–	–	–	–	–	
Andy Delmore	(Canada)	D	3	1998–2001	95	7	15	22	24	20	6	2	8	16	
Eric Desjardins	(Canada)	D	11	1994–2006	738	93	303	396	406	97	14	37	51	38	Captain: 2000–2001; FHOF – 2015
Nicolas Deslauriers‡	(Canada)	LW	4	2022–2026	195	9	11	20	273	–	–	–	–	–	
Elliot Desnoyers	(Canada)	LW	1	2022–2023	4	0	0	0	0	–	–	–	–	–	
Rob DiMaio	(Canada)	C	3	1993–1996	109	12	21	33	117	18	2	4	6	4	
Niko Dimitrakos	(United States)	RW	2	2005–2007	24	5	4	9	12	5	0	0	0	2	
Kevin Dineen	(Canada)	RW	5	1991–1996	284	88	88	176	533	15	6	4	10	18	Captain: 1993–1994
Gilbert Dionne	(Canada)	RW	2	1994–1996	22	0	7	7	2	3	0	0	0	4	
Tomas Divisek	(Czech Republic)	RW	2	2000–2002	5	1	0	1	0	–	–	–	–	–	
Brian Dobbin	(Canada)	RW	4	1986–1990	56	6	8	14	39	2	0	0	0	17	
Jiri Dopita	(Czech Republic)	C	1	2001–2002	52	11	16	27	8	–	–	–	–	–	
Gary Dornhoefer†	(Canada)	RW	11	1967–1978	725	202	316	518	1256	80	17	19	36	203	SC: 1974, 1975; FHOF – 1991
Karsen Dorwart	(United States)	LW	1	2024–2025	5	0	0	0	2	–	–	–	–	–	
Jim Dowd	(United States)	C	1	2007–2008	73	5	5	10	41	17	1	2	3	0	
Steve Downie	(Canada)	RW	3	2007–2009; 2013–2014	89	9	20	29	154	6	0	1	1	10	
Rene Drolet	(Canada)	RW	1	1971–1972	1	0	0	0	0	–	–	–	–	–	
John Druce	(Canada)	RW	3	1995–1998	79	12	14	26	27	17	1	2	3	6	
Jamie Drysdale‡	(Canada)	D	3	2023–2026	172	17	40	57	59	10	2	2	4	10	
Steve Duchesne	(Canada)	D	2	1991–1992; 1998–1999	89	20	43	63	88	6	0	2	2	2	
Blake Dunlop	(Canada)	C	2	1977–1979	69	20	29	49	16	8	1	1	2	4	
Andre Dupont†	(Canada)	D	8	1972–1980	539	42	135	177	1505	108	13	15	28	306	SC: 1974, 1975
Yanick Dupre	(Canada)	LW	3	1991–1992; 1994–1996	35	2	0	2	16	–	–	–	–	–	
Christian Dvorak‡	(United States)	C	1	2025–2026	80	18	33	51	27	10	0	4	4	8	
Miroslav Dvorak	(Czechoslovakia)	D	3	1982–1985	193	11	74	85	51	18	0	2	2	6	
Karl Dykhuis	(Canada)	D	5	1994–1997; 1998–2000	227	13	41	54	211	50	7	9	16	42	
Ben Eager	(Canada)	LW	3	2005–2008	88	9	10	19	251	2	0	0	0	26	
Mark Eaton	(United States)	D	1	1999–2000	27	1	1	2	8	7	0	0	0	0	
Darryl Edestrand	(Canada)	D	1	1969–1970	2	0	0	0	6	–	–	–	–	–	
Pelle Eklund	(Sweden)	C	9	1985–1994	589	118	334	452	107	57	10	33	43	4	
Ryan Ellis	(Canada)	D	1	2021–2022	4	1	4	5	0	–	–	–	–	–	
Matt Ellison	(Canada)	RW	2	2005–2007	7	0	1	1	2	–	–	–	–	–	
Steve Eminger	(Canada)	D	1	2008–2009	12	0	2	2	8	–	–	–	–	–	
Thomas Eriksson	(Sweden)	D	5	1980–1982; 1983–1986	208	22	76	98	107	19	0	3	3	12	
Doug Evans	(Canada)	LW	1	1992–1993	65	8	13	21	70	–	–	–	–	–	
Paul Evans	(Canada)	C	3	1978–1979; 1980–1981; 1982–1983	103	14	25	39	34	1	0	0	0	0	
Pat Falloon	(Canada)	RW	3	1995–1998	144	38	45	83	24	26	6	3	9	4	
Joel Farabee	(United States)	LW	6	2019–2025	384	90	111	201	221	12	3	2	5	4	
Andre Faust	(Canada)	C	2	1992–1994	47	10	7	17	14	–	–	–	–	–	
Todd Fedoruk	(Canada)	LW	5	2000–2004; 2006–2007	268	13	26	39	575	7	0	0	0	22	
Ruslan Fedotenko	(Ukraine)	LW	3	2000–2002; 2012–2013	199	37	38	75	127	11	1	1	2	6	
Brent Fedyk	(Canada)	LW	4	1992–1996	200	59	65	124	160	9	2	2	4	8	
David Fenyves	(Canada)	D	4	1987–1991	58	1	5	6	32	–	–	–	–	–	
Valtteri Filppula	(Finland)	C	2	2016–2018	101	16	25	41	22	6	1	2	3	2	
Jeff Finley	(Canada)	D	1	1993–1994	55	1	8	9	24	–	–	–	–	–	
Craig Fisher	(Canada)	C	2	1989–1991	4	0	0	0	0	–	–	–	–	–	
Rory Fitzpatrick	(Canada)	D	1	2007–2008	19	0	1	1	11	–	–	–	–	–	
Ross Fitzpatrick	(Canada)	C	4	1982–1986	20	5	2	7	0	–	–	–	–	–	
Reg Fleming	(Canada)	LW	1	1969–1970	65	9	18	27	134	–	–	–	–	–	
Bill Flett†	(Canada)	RW	3	1971–1974	167	71	68	139	130	28	3	10	13	21	SC: 1974
Ron Flockhart	(Canada)	C	4	1980–1984	167	65	80	145	108	9	2	2	4	6	
Tyson Foerster‡	(Canada)	RW	4	2022–2026	195	61	39	100	111	10	1	0	1	6	
Rick Foley	(Canada)	D	1	1971–1972	58	11	25	36	168	–	–	–	–	–	
Christian Folin	(Sweden)	D	1	2018–2019	26	0	2	2	16	–	–	–	–	–	
Colin Forbes	(Canada)	LW	3	1996–1999	132	22	14	36	110	8	0	0	0	2	
Peter Forsberg	(Sweden)	C	2	2005–2007	100	30	85	115	118	6	4	4	8	6	Captain: 2006–2007; HHOF – 2014
Corey Foster	(Canada)	D	1	1991–1992	25	3	4	7	20	–	–	–	–	–	
Kurtis Foster	(Canada)	D	1	2012–2013	23	1	4	5	25	–	–	–	–	–	
Nick Fotiu	(United States)	LW	1	1987–1988	23	0	0	0	40	–	–	–	–	–	
Mark Freer	(Canada)	C	5	1986–1990; 1991–1992	59	6	9	15	18	–	–	–	–	–	
Mark Friedman	(Canada)	D	3	2018–2021	11	0	1	1	6	–	–	–	–	–	
Jamie Fritsch	(United States)	D	1	2008–2009	1	0	0	0	0	–	–	–	–	–	
Morgan Frost	(Canada)	C	6	2019–2025	278	50	85	135	80	–	–	–	–	–	
Simon Gagne	(Canada)	LW	11	1999–2010; 2012–2013	691	264	271	535	284	90	32	15	47	26	FHOF – 2027
Sam Gagner	(Canada)	C	1	2015–2016	53	8	8	16	25	6	0	2	2	8	
Garry Galley	(Canada)	D	4	1991–1995	236	28	144	172	260	–	–	–	–	–	
Dave Gardner	(Canada)	C	1	1979–1980	2	1	1	2	0	–	–	–	–	–	
Rhett Gardner	(Canada)	C/LW	1	2023–2024	1	0	0	0	0	–	–	–	–	–	
Jacob Gaucher‡	(Canada)	C	2	2024–2026	8	0	0	0	0	–	–	–	–	–	
Denis Gauthier	(Canada)	D	2	2005–2007	60	0	4	4	82	6	0	1	1	19	
Jean Gauthier	(Canada)	D	1	1967–1968	65	5	7	12	74	7	1	3	4	6	
Jean-Guy Gendron	(Canada)	LW	5	1967–1972	278	69	86	155	203	8	0	1	1	6	
Bruno Gervais	(Canada)	D	1	2012–2013	37	1	5	6	10	–	–	–	–	–	
Hal Gill	(United States)	D	1	2013–2014	6	0	0	0	2	1	0	0	0	0	
Don Gillen	(Canada)	RW	1	1979–1980	1	1	0	1	0	–	–	–	–	–	
Jere Gillis	(United States)	LW	1	1986–1987	1	0	0	0	0	–	–	–	–	–	
Adam Ginning‡	(Sweden)	D	4	2022–2026	16	1	0	1	2	–	–	–	–	–	
Claude Giroux	(Canada)	C	15	2007–2022	1000	291	609	900	412	85	25	48	73	39	Captain: 2013–2022
Luke Glendening‡	(United States)	C	1	2025–2026	18	2	3	5	4	10	1	0	1	6	
Larry Goodenough†	(Canada)	D	3	1974–1977	129	15	56	71	104	21	3	15	18	8	SC: 1975
Boyd Gordon	(Canada)	C	1	2016–2017	13	1	0	1	2	–	–	–	–	–	
Tom Gorence	(United States)	RW	5	1978–1983	291	57	52	109	89	37	9	6	15	47	
Shayne Gostisbehere	(United States)	D	7	2014–2021	381	60	159	219	129	17	2	3	5	10	
Tyrell Goulbourne	(Canada)	LW	2	2017–2019	11	0	0	0	2	–	–	–	–	–	
Helge Grans	(Sweden)	D	1	2024–2025	6	0	1	1	2	–	–	–	–	–	
Derek Grant	(Canada)	C	1	2019–2020	7	1	4	5	2	15	0	2	2	8	
Triston Grant	(Canada)	LW	1	2006–2007	8	0	1	1	10	–	–	–	–	–	
Chris Gratton	(Canada)	C	2	1997–1999	108	23	47	70	200	5	2	0	2	10	
Josh Gratton	(Canada)	LW	2	2005–2006; 2008–2009	22	1	2	3	71	–	–	–	–	–	
Nikita Grebenkin‡	(Russia)	RW	1	2025–2026	55	4	10	14	46	–	–	–	–	–	
Kyle Greentree	(Canada)	LW	1	2007–2008	2	0	0	0	0	–	–	–	–	–	
Mark Greig	(Canada)	RW	4	1998–2001; 2002–2003	30	5	7	12	14	5	0	1	1	0	
Martin Grenier	(Canada)	D	1	2006–2007	3	0	0	0	0	–	–	–	–	–	
Nicklas Grossmann	(Sweden)	D	4	2011–2015	198	7	31	38	118	13	0	1	1	10	
Carl Grundstrom‡	(Sweden)	RW	1	2025–2026	47	9	4	13	19	3	0	1	1	2	
Paul Guay	(United States)	RW	2	1983–1985	16	2	7	9	14	3	0	0	0	4	
Radko Gudas	(Czech Republic)	D	4	2015–2019	290	17	56	73	355	12	0	0	0	27	
Nate Guenin	(United States)	D	3	2006–2009	12	0	2	2	6	–	–	–	–	–	
Denis Gurianov	(Russia)	RW	1	2023–2024	4	0	0	0	0	–	–	–	–	–	
Erik Gustafsson	(Sweden)	D	4	2010–2014	91	6	17	23	14	9	2	1	3	4	
Erik Gustafsson	(Sweden)	D	1	2020–2021	24	1	9	10	0	–	–	–	–	–	
Len Hachborn	(Canada)	C	2	1983–1985	78	16	38	54	27	7	0	3	3	7	
Robert Hagg	(Sweden)	D	5	2016–2021	236	13	34	47	143	14	0	3	3	6	
Larry Hale	(Canada)	D	4	1968–1972	196	5	37	42	90	8	0	0	0	12	
Adam Hall	(United States)	RW	2	2012–2014	91	4	5	9	23	7	0	1	1	7	
Kevin Haller	(Canada)	D	3	1994–1997	132	7	22	29	177	21	4	5	9	18	
Denis Hamel	(Canada)	LW	1	2006–2007	7	0	0	0	0	–	–	–	–	–	
Michal Handzus	(Slovakia)	C	3	2002–2006	237	54	92	146	166	37	7	13	20	18	
John Hanna	(Canada)	D	1	1967–1968	15	0	0	0	0	–	–	–	–	–	
Pat Hannigan	(Canada)	RW	2	1967–1969	72	11	16	27	58	7	1	2	3	9	
Jeff Harding	(Canada)	RW	2	1988–1990	15	0	0	0	47	–	–	–	–	–	
Ted Harris†	(Canada)	D	1	1974–1975	70	1	6	7	48	16	0	4	4	4	SC: 1975
Ryan Hartman	(United States)	RW	1	2018–2019	19	2	4	6	30	–	–	–	–	–	
Scott Hartnell	(Canada)	LW	7	2007–2014	517	157	169	326	908	75	16	25	41	112	
Derian Hatcher	(United States)	D	3	2005–2008	203	9	24	33	193	21	1	4	5	50	Captain: 2006
Garnet Hathaway‡	(Canada)	RW	3	2023–2026	215	18	23	41	249	8	1	1	2	14	
Dale Hawerchuk	(Canada)	C	2	1995–1997	67	16	38	54	36	29	5	11	16	12	HHOF – 2001
Greg Hawgood	(Canada)	D	2	1992–1994	59	9	34	43	58	–	–	–	–	–	
Kevin Hayes	(United States)	C	4	2019–2023	253	63	94	157	105	16	4	9	13	2	
Paul Healey	(Canada)	RW	2	1996–1998	6	0	0	0	12	–	–	–	–	–	
Earl Heiskala	(Canada)	LW	3	1968–1971	127	13	11	24	294	–	–	–	–	–	
Wayne Hicks	(United States)	RW	1	1967–1968	32	2	7	9	6	–	–	–	–	–	
Al Hill	(Canada)	LW	8	1976–1982; 1986–1988	221	40	55	95	227	51	8	11	19	43	
Larry Hillman	(Canada)	D	2	1969–1971	149	8	39	47	112	4	0	2	2	2	
Wayne Hillman	(Canada)	D	4	1969–1973	258	8	25	33	170	8	0	0	0	0	
Jan Hlavac	(Czech Republic)	LW	1	2001–2002	31	7	3	10	8	–	–	–	–	–	
Todd Hlushko	(Canada)	C	1	1993–1994	2	1	0	1	0	–	–	–	–	–	
Ed Hoekstra	(Canada)	C	1	1967–1968	70	15	21	36	6	7	0	1	1	0	
Bob Hoffmeyer	(Canada)	D	2	1981–1983	92	9	31	40	182	3	0	1	1	25	
Hayden Hodgson	(Canada)	RW	2	2021–2023	7	1	2	3	11	–	–	–	–	–	
Linus Hogberg	(Sweden)	D	1	2021–2022	5	0	2	2	2	–	–	–	–	–	
Milos Holan	(Czech Republic)	D	1	1993–1994	8	1	1	2	4	–	–	–	–	–	
Paul Holmgren	(United States)	RW	9	1975–1984	500	138	171	309	1600	67	19	31	50	181	FHOF – 2021
Ben Holmstrom	(United States)	C	2	2010–2012	7	0	0	0	7	–	–	–	–	–	
Randy Holt	(Canada)	D	1	1983–1984	26	0	0	0	74	–	–	–	–	–	
Tony Horacek	(Canada)	LW	3	1989–1992	116	9	14	23	217	–	–	–	–	–	
Ed Hospodar	(United States)	D	3	1984–1987	112	8	7	15	321	23	1	1	2	71	
Martin Hostak	(Czechoslovakia)	C	2	1990–1992	55	3	11	14	24	–	–	–	–	–	
Mark Howe	(United States)	D	10	1982–1992	594	138	342	480	323	82	8	45	53	30	FHOF – 2001; HHOF – 2011; Ret # 2 – 2012
Dave Hoyda	(Canada)	LW	2	1977–1979	108	4	16	20	257	12	0	0	0	17	
Petr Hubacek	(Czech Republic)	C	1	2000–2001	6	1	0	1	2	–	–	–	–	–	
Willie Huber	(Canada)	D	1	1987–1988	10	4	9	13	16	5	0	0	0	2	
Kerry Huffman	(Canada)	D	7	1986–1992; 1995–1996	207	23	61	84	158	8	0	0	0	2	
Brent Hughes	(Canada)	D	3	1970–1973	122	5	41	46	88	4	0	0	0	6	
Jody Hull	(Canada)	RW	3	1998–2001	210	20	22	42	26	30	0	1	1	8	
Kent Huskins	(Canada)	D	1	2012–2013	8	0	1	1	0	–	–	–	–	–	
Gord Hynes	(Canada)	D	1	1992–1993	37	3	4	7	16	–	–	–	–	–	
Jaromir Jagr	(Czech Republic)	RW	1	2011–2012	73	19	35	54	30	11	1	7	8	2	
Chris Jensen	(Canada)	RW	3	1989–1992	21	2	1	3	4	–	–	–	–	–	
David Jiricek‡	(Czech Republic)	D	1	2025–2026	1	0	0	0	2	–	–	–	–	–	
Erik Johnson	(United States)	D	2	2023–2025	39	3	3	6	13	–	–	–	–	–	
Jim Johnson	(Canada)	C	5	1967–1972	266	66	102	168	67	7	0	2	2	2	
Kim Johnsson	(Sweden)	D	4	2001–2006	291	40	107	147	140	33	2	9	11	18	
Blair Jones	(Canada)	C	1	2014–2015	4	0	0	0	2	–	–	–	–	–	
Brad Jones	(United States)	LW	1	1991–1992	48	7	10	17	44	–	–	–	–	–	
Keith Jones	(Canada)	RW	3	1998–2001	131	27	47	74	164	24	5	4	9	28	
Randy Jones	(Canada)	D	5	2003–2009	217	13	56	69	134	22	0	3	3	4	
Lars Jonsson	(Sweden)	D	1	2006–2007	8	0	2	2	6	–	–	–	–	–	
Chris Joseph	(Canada)	D	2	1997–1999	17	1	0	1	21	1	0	0	0	2	
Eddie Joyal	(Canada)	C	1	1971–1972	26	3	4	7	8	–	–	–	–	–	
Patrik Juhlin	(Sweden)	LW	2	1994–1996	56	7	6	13	23	13	1	0	1	2	
Noah Juulsen‡	(Canada)	D	1	2025–2026	52	1	9	10	15	5	0	2	2	0	
Jon Kalinski	(Canada)	LW	2	2008–2010	22	1	4	5	0	–	–	–	–	–	
Tomi Kallio	(Finland)	RW	1	2002–2003	7	1	0	1	2	–	–	–	–	–	
Boyd Kane	(Canada)	LW	3	2003–2004; 2006–2007; 2008–2009	23	0	2	2	35	–	–	–	–	–	
Sami Kapanen	(Finland)	RW	5	2002–2008	311	44	66	110	70	37	7	10	17	14	
Devin Kaplan	(United States)	RW	1	2024–2025	1	0	0	0	0	–	–	–	–	–	
David Kase	(Czech Republic)	RW	2	2019–2021	7	1	0	1	0	–	–	–	–	–	
Steve Kasper	(Canada)	C	2	1991–1993	53	6	5	11	14	–	–	–	–	–	
Pat Kavanagh	(Canada)	RW	1	2005–2006	8	0	0	0	2	–	–	–	–	–	
Larry Keenan	(Canada)	LW	1	1971–1972	14	1	1	2	2	–	–	–	–	–	
Bob Kelly†	(Canada)	LW	10	1970–1980	741	128	168	296	1285	101	9	14	23	172	SC: 1974, 1975; FHOF – 2027
Forbes Kennedy	(Canada)	C	2	1967–1969	132	18	25	43	325	7	1	4	5	14	
Tim Kerr	(Canada)	RW	11	1980–1991	601	363	287	650	577	73	39	31	70	58	FHOF – 1994
Orest Kindrachuk†	(Canada)	C	6	1972–1978	360	79	181	260	465	69	16	19	35	46	SC: 1974, 1975
Trent Klatt	(United States)	RW	4	1995–1999	209	41	57	98	57	36	8	4	12	12	
Corban Knight	(Canada)	C	1	2018–2019	23	1	3	4	0	–	–	–	–	–	
Mike Knuble	(United States)	RW	5	2005–2009; 2012–2013	338	118	111	229	290	24	6	8	14	16	
Matt Konan	(United States)	D	1	2012–2013	2	0	0	0	0	–	–	–	–	–	
Travis Konecny‡	(Canada)	RW	10	2016–2026	723	225	319	544	522	32	2	11	13	26	
Dan Kordic	(Canada)	LW	6	1991–1992; 1993–1994; 1995–1999	197	4	8	12	584	12	1	0	1	22	
Andrei Kovalenko	(Russia)	RW	1	1998–1999	13	0	1	1	2	–	–	–	–	–	
Lukas Krajicek	(Czech Republic)	D	1	2009–2010	27	1	1	2	14	22	0	3	3	8	
Pavel Kubina	(Czech Republic)	D	1	2011–2012	17	0	4	4	15	5	0	1	1	12	
Frantisek Kucera	(Czech Republic)	D	1	1996–1997	2	0	0	0	2	–	–	–	–	–	
Lasse Kukkonen	(Finland)	D	3	2006–2009	95	1	6	7	56	14	0	2	2	6	
Dale Kushner	(Canada)	LW	2	1990–1992	82	10	13	23	213	–	–	–	–	–	
Andrei Kuzmenko	(Russia)	LW	1	2024–2025	7	2	3	5	0	–	–	–	–	–	
Normand Lacombe	(Canada)	RW	2	1989–1991	92	11	22	33	34	–	–	–	–	–	
Andre Lacroix	(Canada)	C	4	1967–1971	245	72	98	170	36	15	2	5	7	0	
Daniel Lacroix	(Canada)	C	2	1996–1998	130	8	5	13	298	16	0	1	1	26	
Tanner Laczynski	(United States)	C	3	2020–2023	38	2	2	4	2	–	–	–	–	–	
Claude LaForge	(Canada)	LW	2	1967–1969	65	9	16	25	36	5	1	2	3	15	
Serge Lajeunesse	(Canada)	D	2	1973–1975	6	0	0	0	2	–	–	–	–	–	
David Laliberte	(Canada)	RW	1	2009–2010	11	2	1	3	6	1	0	0	0	2	
Mark Lamb	(Canada)	C	2	1993–1995	27	1	8	9	18	–	–	–	–	–	
Mitch Lamoureux	(Canada)	C	1	1987–1988	3	0	0	0	0	–	–	–	–	–	
Daymond Langkow	(Canada)	C	3	1998–2001	209	41	86	127	130	28	7	11	18	27	
Jeff Lank	(Canada)	D	1	1999–2000	2	0	0	0	2	–	–	–	–	–	
Ian Laperriere	(Canada)	RW	1	2009–2010	82	3	17	20	162	13	0	1	1	6	
Claude Lapointe	(Canada)	C	2	2002–2004	56	7	5	12	48	14	2	3	5	14	
Rick Lapointe	(Canada)	D	3	1976–1979	146	8	42	50	183	29	0	4	4	40	
Jiri Latal	(Czechoslovakia)	D	3	1989–1992	92	12	36	48	24	–	–	–	–	–	
Scott Laughton	(Canada)	C	12	2012–2013; 2014–2025	661	106	159	265	386	24	6	4	10	27	
Oliver Lauridsen	(Denmark)	D	2	2012–2013; 2014–2015	16	2	1	3	44	–	–	–	–	–	
Kirby Law	(Canada)	RW	3	2000–2001; 2002–2004	9	0	1	1	4	–	–	–	–	–	
Paul Lawless	(Canada)	LW	1	1987–1988	8	0	5	5	0	–	–	–	–	–	
Reggie Leach†	(Canada)	RW	8	1974–1982	606	306	208	514	276	91	47	22	69	22	SC: 1975; FHOF – 1992
Vincent Lecavalier	(Canada)	C	3	2013–2016	133	28	30	58	82	7	1	1	2	2	
John LeClair	(United States)	LW	10	1994–2004	649	333	310	643	337	116	35	39	74	68	FHOF – 2014
Guillaume Lefebvre	(Canada)	LW	2	2001–2003	17	0	0	0	4	–	–	–	–	–	
Jori Lehtera	(Finland)	C	2	2017–2019	89	4	7	11	47	6	0	2	2	0	
Taylor Leier	(Canada)	LW	3	2015–2018	55	2	5	7	10	–	–	–	–	–	
Ville Leino	(Finland)	LW	2	2009–2011	94	21	36	57	26	30	10	16	26	6	
Brendan Lemieux	(United States)	LW	1	2022–2023	18	2	4	6	21	–	–	–	–	–	
Bill Lesuk	(Canada)	LW	2	1970–1972	123	24	25	49	112	4	1	0	1	8	
Andreas Lilja	(Sweden)	D	2	2011–2013	50	0	6	6	34	10	0	0	0	6	
Oskar Lindblom	(Sweden)	LW	5	2017–2022	263	50	47	97	63	6	0	0	0	0	
Eric Lindros	(Canada)	C	8	1992–2000	486	290	369	659	946	50	24	33	57	118	Captain: 1994–2000; FHOF – 2014; HHOF – 2016; Ret # 88 – 2018
Ken Linseman	(Canada)	C	5	1978–1982; 1989–1990	269	73	184	257	585	41	11	42	53	135	
Andrei Lomakin	(Russia)	LW	2	1991–1993	108	22	28	50	60	–	–	–	–	–	
Ross Lonsberry†	(Canada)	LW	7	1971–1978	497	144	170	314	403	83	19	22	41	74	SC: 1974, 1975
Danny Lucas	(Canada)	RW	1	1978–1979	6	1	0	1	0	–	–	–	–	–	
Jett Luchanko‡	(Canada)	C	2	2024–2026	8	0	0	0	4	1	0	0	0	0	
Joffrey Lupul	(Canada)	RW	2	2007–2009	135	45	51	96	93	23	5	7	12	4	
Olle Lycksell	(Sweden)	RW	3	2022–2025	45	1	10	11	16	–	–	–	–	–	
Roman Lyubimov	(Russia)	LW	1	2016–2017	47	4	2	6	8	–	–	–	–	–	
Al MacAdam	(Canada)	RW	1	1973–1974	5	0	0	0	0	1	0	0	0	0	
Andrew MacDonald	(Canada)	D	6	2013–2019	291	11	61	72	137	19	4	1	5	16	
Zack MacEwen	(Canada)	C	2	2021–2023	121	7	11	18	164	–	–	–	–	–	
Rick MacLeish†	(Canada)	C	12	1970–1981; 1983–1984	741	328	369	697	384	108	53	52	105	38	SC: 1974, 1975; FHOF – 1990
Ian MacNeil	(Canada)	C	1	2002–2003	2	0	0	0	0	–	–	–	–	–	
Ralph MacSweyn	(Canada)	D	5	1967–1972	47	0	5	5	10	8	0	0	0	6	
Craig MacTavish	(Canada)	C	2	1994–1996	100	8	17	25	85	15	1	4	5	20	
Kevin Maguire	(Canada)	RW	1	1989–1990	5	1	0	1	6	–	–	–	–	–	
Jim Mair	(Canada)	D	2	1970–1972	4	0	0	0	0	3	1	2	3	4	
Vladimir Malakhov	(Russia)	D	1	2003–2004	6	0	1	1	2	17	1	5	6	12	
Stewart Malgunas	(Canada)	D	2	1993–1995	71	1	3	4	90	–	–	–	–	–	
Kent Manderville	(Canada)	C	3	1999–2002	129	7	18	25	59	24	1	3	4	24	
Mike Maneluk	(Canada)	RW	2	1998–2000	14	2	6	8	12	–	–	–	–	–	
Brandon Manning	(Canada)	D	6	2011–2013; 2014–2018	207	11	32	43	212	12	0	1	1	18	
Moe Mantha	(United States)	D	2	1988–1989; 1991–1992	35	3	8	11	35	1	0	0	0	0	
Danny Markov	(Russia)	D	1	2003–2004	34	2	3	5	58	18	1	2	3	25	
Brad Marsh	(Canada)	D	7	1981–1988	514	14	96	110	636	66	5	12	17	95	
Kevin Marshall	(Canada)	D	1	2011–2012	10	0	0	0	8	–	–	–	–	–	
Danick Martel	(Canada)	LW	1	2017–2018	4	0	0	0	0	–	–	–	–	–	
Porter Martone‡	(Canada)	RW	1	2025–2026	9	4	6	10	6	10	2	3	5	6	
Gerald Mayhew	(United States)	F	1	2021–2022	25	6	0	6	10	–	–	–	–	–	
Chris McAllister	(Canada)	D	3	2000–2003	121	2	7	9	258	2	0	0	0	0	
Dean McAmmond	(Canada)	LW	1	2000–2001	10	1	1	2	0	4	0	0	0	2	
Kevin McCarthy	(Canada)	D	4	1977–1979; 1985–1987	90	3	17	20	57	10	0	1	1	8	
Sandy McCarthy	(Canada)	RW	2	1998–2000	71	6	6	12	136	6	0	1	1	0	
Brad McCrimmon	(Canada)	D	5	1982–1987	367	35	152	187	355	46	7	6	13	55	
Colin McDonald	(United States)	RW	2	2015–2017	8	2	0	2	7	3	0	0	0	0	
Hunter McDonald‡	(United States)	D	1	2025–2026	1	0	1	1	4	–	–	–	–	–	
Ryan McGill	(Canada)	D	3	1992–1995	134	4	13	17	363	–	–	–	–	–	
Dan McGillis	(Canada)	D	6	1997–2003	340	32	108	140	303	40	5	9	14	48	
Tye McGinn	(Canada)	LW	2	2012–2014	36	7	3	10	23	–	–	–	–	–	
Jack McIlhargey	(Canada)	D	5	1974–1977; 1979–1981	128	3	7	10	497	24	0	3	3	66	
Evgeny Medvedev	(Russia)	D	1	2015–2016	45	4	9	13	34	–	–	–	–	–	
Gerry Meehan	(Canada)	C	1	1968–1969	12	0	3	3	4	4	0	0	0	0	
Scott Mellanby	(Canada)	RW	6	1985–1991	355	83	114	197	694	50	9	11	20	90	
Eric Meloche	(Canada)	RW	1	2006–2007	13	1	2	3	4	–	–	–	–	–	
Andrej Meszaros	(Slovakia)	D	4	2010–2014	192	20	56	76	116	12	2	4	6	8	
Victor Mete	(Canada)	D	1	2023–2024	1	0	0	0	0	–	–	–	–	–	
Glen Metropolit	(Canada)	C	1	2008–2009	55	4	10	14	15	–	–	–	–	–	
Freddy Meyer	(United States)	D	3	2003–2007	83	8	24	32	47	–	–	–	–	–	
Dave Michayluk	(Canada)	LW	2	1981–1983	14	2	6	8	8	–	–	–	–	–	
Matvei Michkov‡	(Russia)	RW	2	2024–2026	161	46	68	114	117	8	0	1	1	6	
Larry Mickey	(Canada)	RW	1	1971–1972	14	1	2	3	8	–	–	–	–	–	
John Miszuk	(Canada)	D	2	1967–1969	140	6	30	36	149	11	0	3	3	11	
Jaroslav Modry	(Czech Republic)	D	1	2007–2008	19	0	3	3	8	9	0	3	3	0	
Carl Mokosak	(Canada)	LW	1	1985–1986	1	0	0	0	5	–	–	–	–	–	
Jim Montgomery	(Canada)	C	2	1994–1996	13	2	3	5	15	8	1	0	1	2	
Samuel Morin	(Canada)	D	5	2016–2021	29	1	0	1	45	–	–	–	–	–	
Gary Morrison	(United States)	RW	3	1979–1982	43	1	15	16	70	5	0	1	1	2	
Lew Morrison	(Canada)	RW	3	1969–1972	202	19	22	41	70	4	0	0	0	2	
Glenn Mulvenna	(Canada)	C	1	1992–1993	1	0	0	0	2	–	–	–	–	–	
Ty Murchison‡	(United States)	D	1	2025–2026	3	0	0	0	0	–	–	–	–	–	
Gord Murphy	(Canada)	D	4	1988–1992	261	31	97	128	254	19	2	7	9	13	
Marty Murray	(Canada)	C	2	2001–2003	150	23	30	53	23	9	0	1	1	4	
Mike Murray	(Canada)	C	1	1987–1988	1	0	0	0	0	–	–	–	–	–	
Pat Murray	(Canada)	LW	2	1990–1992	25	3	1	4	15	–	–	–	–	–	
Terry Murray	(Canada)	D	4	1975–1977; 1978–1979; 1980–1981	115	1	30	31	69	18	2	2	4	10	
Philippe Myers	(Canada)	D	3	2018–2021	115	6	23	29	54	16	3	1	4	8	
Brantt Myhres	(Canada)	RW	1	1997–1998	23	0	0	0	169	–	–	–	–	–	
Don Nachbaur	(Canada)	C	5	1985–1990	65	2	8	10	192	9	1	1	2	17	
Ric Nattress	(Canada)	D	1	1992–1993	44	7	10	17	29	–	–	–	–	–	
Petr Nedved	(Czech Republic)	C	2	2005–2007	49	6	15	21	54	6	2	0	2	8	
Kris Newbury	(Canada)	C	1	2013–2014	4	0	1	1	7	–	–	–	–	–	
Janne Niinimaa	(Finland)	D	2	1996–1998	143	7	71	78	114	19	1	12	13	16	
Matt Niskanen	(United States)	D	1	2019–2020	68	8	25	33	29	15	1	1	2	6	
Andreas Nodl	(Austria)	RW	4	2008–2012	127	12	16	28	20	12	0	0	0	0	
Simon Nolet†	(Canada)	RW	7	1967–1974	358	93	108	201	129	31	6	3	9	8	SC: 1974
Sean O'Donnell	(Canada)	D	1	2010–2011	81	1	17	18	87	11	0	0	0	0	
Will O'Neill	(United States)	D	1	2017–2018	1	0	0	0	0	–	–	–	–	–	
Adam Oates	(Canada)	C	1	2001–2002	14	3	7	10	6	5	0	2	2	0	HHOF – 2012
Gino Odjick	(Canada)	LW	2	1999–2001	30	4	4	8	38	–	–	–	–	–	
Johnny Oduya	(Sweden)	D	1	2017–2018	1	0	0	0	0	–	–	–	–	–	
Randy Osburn	(Canada)	LW	1	1974–1975	1	0	0	0	0	–	–	–	–	–	
Joel Otto	(Canada)	C	3	1995–1998	213	28	52	80	292	35	4	9	13	19	
John Paddock	(Canada)	RW	3	1976–1977; 1979–1980; 1982–1983	47	5	8	13	49	3	2	0	2	0	
Rosaire Paiement	(Canada)	RW	3	1967–1970	43	4	5	9	74	3	3	0	3	0	
Ryan Parent	(Canada)	D	4	2006–2010	102	1	6	7	36	27	1	1	2	8	
Michel Parizeau	(Canada)	LW	1	1971–1972	37	2	12	14	10	–	–	–	–	–	
Richard Park	(United States)	C	1	1998–1999	7	0	0	0	0	–	–	–	–	–	
Greg Paslawski	(Canada)	RW	1	1992–1993	60	14	19	33	12	–	–	–	–	–	
Joe Paterson	(Canada)	LW	2	1984–1986	11	0	0	0	43	17	3	4	7	70	
Nolan Patrick	(Canada)	C	3	2017–2021	197	30	40	70	77	6	1	1	2	0	
Dennis Patterson	(Canada)	D	1	1979–1980	3	0	1	1	0	–	–	–	–	–	
Lane Pederson‡	(Canada)	F	1	2025–2026	5	0	0	0	0	–	–	–	–	–	
Mark Pederson	(Canada)	LW	3	1990–1993	84	20	30	50	33	–	–	–	–	–	
Jakob Pelletier	(Canada)	LW	1	2024–2025	25	3	5	8	4	–	–	–	–	–	
Roger Pelletier	(Canada)	D	1	1967–1968	1	0	0	0	0	–	–	–	–	–	
Mike Peluso	(United States)	LW	1	2003–2004	1	0	0	0	0	–	–	–	–	–	
Garry Peters	(Canada)	C	4	1967–1971	229	27	28	55	209	8	2	2	4	31	
Michel Petit	(Canada)	D	1	1996–1997	20	0	3	3	51	3	0	0	0	6	
Alexandre Picard	(Canada)	D	3	2005–2008	68	3	19	22	21	–	–	–	–	–	
Michel Picard	(Canada)	LW	1	2000–2001	7	1	4	5	0	–	–	–	–	–	
Joni Pitkanen	(Finland)	D	3	2003–2007	206	25	91	116	210	21	0	5	5	8	
Tyler Pitlick	(United States)	C	1	2019–2020	63	8	12	20	12	16	2	1	3	0	
Derek Plante	(United States)	C	1	2000–2001	12	1	2	3	4	5	0	1	1	0	
Pierre Plante	(Canada)	RW	2	1971–1973	26	1	3	4	15	–	–	–	–	–	
Vaclav Pletka	(Czech Republic)	RW	1	2001–2002	1	0	0	0	0	–	–	–	–	–	
Shjon Podein	(United States)	LW	5	1994–1999	301	44	48	92	216	51	6	8	14	86	
Ryan Poehling	(United States)	C	2	2023–2025	145	23	36	59	22	–	–	–	–	–	
Ryan Potulny	(United States)	C	3	2005–2008	44	7	7	14	26	–	–	–	–	–	
Jean Potvin	(Canada)	D	2	1971–1973	64	6	21	27	16	–	–	–	–	–	
Dave Poulin	(Canada)	C	8	1982–1990	467	161	233	394	303	63	17	22	39	53	Captain: 1984–1989; FHOF – 2004
Darroll Powe	(Canada)	C	3	2008–2011	204	22	21	43	130	40	1	4	5	17	
Yves Preston	(Canada)	LW	2	1978–1979; 1980–1981	28	7	3	10	4	–	–	–	–	–	
Keith Primeau	(Canada)	C	6	1999–2006	312	87	126	213	414	58	12	22	34	63	Captain: 2001–2006
David Printz	(Sweden)	D	2	2005–2007	13	0	0	0	4	–	–	–	–	–	
Chris Pronger	(Canada)	D	3	2009–2012	145	15	77	92	133	26	4	15	19	40	Captain: 2011–2013; HHOF – 2015
Brian Propp	(Canada)	LW	11	1979–1990	790	369	480	849	669	116	52	60	112	121	FHOF – 1999
Vaclav Prospal	(Czech Republic)	C	3	1996–1998; 2007–2008	77	14	33	47	27	22	4	13	17	10	
Nate Prosser	(United States)	D	1	2020–2021	6	1	1	2	0	–	–	–	–	–	
Ivan Provorov	(Russia)	D	7	2016–2023	532	65	152	217	196	22	3	8	11	4	
Mika Pyorala	(Finland)	C	1	2009–2010	36	2	2	4	10	–	–	–	–	–	
Dan Quinn	(Canada)	C	2	1991–1992; 1995–1996	102	18	40	58	48	12	1	4	5	6	
Yves Racine	(Canada)	D	1	1993–1994	67	9	43	52	48	–	–	–	–	–	
Branko Radivojevic	(Slovakia)	RW	2	2003–2006	88	9	14	23	80	23	2	1	3	32	
Nate Raduns	(United States)	RW	1	2008–2009	1	0	0	0	0	–	–	–	–	–	
Michael Raffl	(Austria)	LW	8	2013–2021	504	81	79	160	212	28	5	3	8	6	
Marcus Ragnarsson	(Sweden)	D	2	2002–2004	113	9	15	24	90	27	1	5	6	20	
Rob Ramage	(Canada)	D	1	1993–1994	15	0	1	1	14	–	–	–	–	–	
Paul Ranheim	(United States)	LW	3	2000–2003	187	15	15	30	56	11	0	2	2	2	
Isaac Ratcliffe	(Canada)	LW	1	2021–2022	10	1	3	4	10	–	–	–	–	–	
Mike Rathje	(Canada)	D	2	2005–2007	97	3	22	25	52	6	0	0	0	6	
Matt Read	(Canada)	RW	7	2011–2018	437	87	100	187	81	30	5	5	10	14	
Ryan Ready	(Canada)	LW	1	2005–2006	7	0	1	1	0	–	–	–	–	–	
Mark Recchi	(Canada)	RW	10	1991–1995; 1998–2004	602	232	395	627	388	65	19	20	39	18	HHOF – 2017; FHOF – 2024
Darren Reid	(Canada)	RW	1	2006–2007	14	0	0	0	18	–	–	–	–	–	
Mikael Renberg	(Sweden)	RW	6	1993–1997; 1998–2000	366	128	168	296	210	50	14	20	34	24	
Mike Ricci	(Canada)	C	2	1990–1992	146	41	56	97	157	–	–	–	–	–	
Anthony Richard‡	(Canada)	C	2	2024–2026	16	2	4	6	0	–	–	–	–	–	
Mike Richards	(Canada)	C	6	2005–2011	453	133	216	349	397	63	16	34	50	49	Captain: 2008–2011
Luke Richardson	(Canada)	D	5	1997–2002	387	7	28	35	618	34	0	1	1	49	
Dave Richter	(Canada)	D	1	1985–1986	50	0	2	2	138	5	0	0	0	21	
Zac Rinaldo	(Canada)	LW	5	2010–2015	223	8	16	24	572	14	0	0	0	64	
Rasmus Ristolainen‡	(Finland)	D	5	2021–2026	278	11	62	73	108	10	1	4	5	20	
Bob Ritchie	(Canada)	LW	1	1976–1977	1	0	0	0	0	–	–	–	–	–	
Gordie Roberts	(United States)	D	1	1987–1988	11	1	2	3	15	–	–	–	–	–	
Randy Robitaille	(Canada)	C	1	2006–2007	28	5	12	17	22	–	–	–	–	–	
Leon Rochefort	(Canada)	RW	2	1967–1969	139	35	42	77	26	10	2	0	2	2	
Jeremy Roenick	(United States)	C	3	2001–2004	216	67	106	173	211	36	7	14	21	30	HHOF – 2024
Russ Romaniuk	(Canada)	LW	1	1995–1996	17	3	0	3	17	1	0	0	0	0	
Bill Root	(Canada)	D	1	1987–1988	24	1	2	3	16	2	0	0	0	0	
Jay Rosehill	(Canada)	LW	2	2012–2014	45	3	0	3	154	–	–	–	–	–	
Jared Ross	(United States)	C	2	2008–2010	13	0	0	0	2	9	1	0	1	0	
Magnus Roupe	(Sweden)	LW	2	1987–1989	40	3	5	8	42	–	–	–	–	–	
German Rubtsov	(Russia)	C	1	2019–2020	4	0	0	0	0	–	–	–	–	–	
Darren Rumble	(Canada)	D	3	1990–1991; 1995–1997	18	1	0	1	4	–	–	–	–	–	
Stefan Ruzicka	(Slovakia)	RW	3	2005–2008	55	4	13	17	47	–	–	–	–	–	
Shaun Sabol	(United States)	D	1	1989–1990	2	0	0	0	0	–	–	–	–	–	
Joe Sacco	(United States)	RW	1	2002–2003	34	1	5	6	20	4	0	0	0	0	
Don Saleski†	(Canada)	RW	8	1971–1979	476	118	117	235	602	82	13	17	30	131	SC: 1974, 1975
Kjell Samuelsson	(Sweden)	D	9	1986–1992; 1995–1998	545	35	106	141	815	70	4	12	16	98	
Ulf Samuelsson	(Sweden)	D	1	1999–2000	49	1	2	3	58	–	–	–	–	–	
Scott Sandelin	(United States)	D	1	1990–1991	15	0	3	3	0	–	–	–	–	–	
Geoff Sanderson	(Canada)	LW	1	2006–2007	58	11	18	29	44	–	–	–	–	–	
Linus Sandin	(Sweden)	F	1	2021–2022	1	0	0	0	0	–	–	–	–	–	
Travis Sanheim‡	(Canada)	D	9	2017–2026	660	65	185	250	279	30	4	7	11	14	
Dick Sarrazin	(Canada)	RW	3	1968–1970; 1971–1972	100	20	35	55	22	4	0	0	0	0	
Andre Savage	(Canada)	C	1	2002–2003	16	2	1	3	4	–	–	–	–	–	
Brian Savage	(Canada)	LW	1	2005–2006	66	9	5	14	28	6	1	0	1	4	
Luca Sbisa	(Switzerland)	D	1	2008–2009	39	0	7	7	36	1	0	0	0	2	
Brayden Schenn	(Canada)	C	6	2011–2017	424	109	137	246	217	24	3	11	14	23	
Luke Schenn	(Canada)	D	4	2012–2016	213	12	30	42	140	7	1	0	1	0	
Cliff Schmautz	(Canada)	RW	1	1970–1971	30	8	12	20	23	–	–	–	–	–	
Danny Schock	(Canada)	LW	1	1970–1971	14	1	2	3	0	–	–	–	–	–	
Dave Schultz†	(Canada)	LW	5	1971–1976	297	51	64	115	1386	61	7	9	16	363	SC: 1974, 1975; FHOF – 2009
Nick Schultz	(Canada)	D	3	2014–2017	189	3	26	29	99	6	0	0	0	2	
Glen Seabrooke	(Canada)	C	3	1986–1989	19	1	6	7	4	–	–	–	–	–	
Al Secord	(Canada)	LW	1	1988–1989	20	1	0	1	38	14	0	4	4	31	
Lukas Sedlak	(Czech Republic)	C	1	2022–2023	27	3	5	8	12	–	–	–	–	–	
Nick Seeler‡	(United States)	D	5	2021–2026	348	13	47	60	237	10	1	0	1	28	
Dennis Seidenberg	(Germany)	D	3	2002–2006	92	6	14	20	36	3	0	0	0	0	
Brit Selby	(Canada)	LW	2	1967–1969	119	25	28	53	47	7	1	1	2	4	
Anatoli Semenov	(Russia)	C	2	1994–1996	70	4	15	19	20	15	2	4	6	0	
Tom Sestito	(United States)	LW	2	2011–2013	21	2	1	3	85	–	–	–	–	–	
Patrick Sharp	(Canada)	C	3	2002–2006	66	10	5	15	67	12	1	0	1	2	
Jody Shelley	(Canada)	LW	3	2010–2013	89	2	3	5	191	2	0	0	0	2	
Mike Siklenka	(Canada)	RW	1	2002–2003	1	0	0	0	0	–	–	–	–	–	
Mike Sillinger	(Canada)	C	2	1997–1999	52	11	14	25	24	3	1	0	1	0	
Jon Sim	(Canada)	LW	1	2005–2006	39	7	7	14	28	–	–	–	–	–	
Wayne Simmonds	(Canada)	RW	8	2011–2019	584	203	175	378	784	30	5	10	15	77	
Reid Simpson	(Canada)	LW	1	1991–1992	1	0	0	0	0	–	–	–	–	–	
Ilkka Sinisalo	(Finland)	RW	9	1981–1990	526	199	209	408	180	66	21	10	31	6	
Bob Sirois	(Canada)	LW	2	1974–1976	4	1	0	1	4	–	–	–	–	–	
Darryl Sittler	(Canada)	C	3	1981–1984	191	84	94	178	148	10	4	3	7	17	HHOF – 1989
Jarrod Skalde	(Canada)	C	1	2001–2002	1	0	0	0	2	–	–	–	–	–	
Wade Skolney	(Canada)	D	1	2005–2006	1	0	0	0	2	–	–	–	–	–	
John Slaney	(Canada)	D	2	2001–2002; 2003–2004	5	0	2	2	0	1	0	0	0	0	
David Sloane	(United States)	D	1	2008–2009	1	0	0	0	0	–	–	–	–	–	
Derrick Smith	(Canada)	LW	7	1984–1991	494	80	87	167	338	75	13	11	24	70	
Jason Smith	(Canada)	D	1	2007–2008	77	1	9	10	86	17	0	2	2	4	Captain: 2007–2008
Steve Smith	(Canada)	D	4	1981–1982; 1984–1987	14	0	1	1	15	–	–	–	–	–	
Greg Smyth	(Canada)	D	2	1986–1988	49	1	6	7	192	6	0	0	0	40	
Dave Snuggerud	(United States)	LW	1	1992–1993	14	0	2	2	0	–	–	–	–	–	
Radovan Somik	(Slovakia)	LW	2	2002–2004	113	12	20	32	27	15	2	2	4	10	
Bruno St. Jacques	(Canada)	D	2	2001–2003	13	0	0	0	4	–	–	–	–	–	
Marc Staal	(Canada)	D	1	2023–2024	35	1	4	5	14	–	–	–	–	–	
Myron Stankiewicz	(Canada)	LW	1	1968–1969	19	0	5	5	25	1	0	0	0	0	
Allan Stanley	(Canada)	D	1	1968–1969	64	4	13	17	28	3	0	1	1	4	HHOF – 1981
Daryl Stanley	(Canada)	D	3	1983–1984; 1985–1987	89	2	8	10	216	17	0	0	0	30	
John Stevens	(Canada)	D	2	1986–1988	9	0	2	2	14	–	–	–	–	–	
Kevin Stevens	(United States)	LW	1	2000–2001	23	2	7	9	18	–	–	–	–	–	
Turner Stevenson	(Canada)	RW	1	2005–2006	31	1	3	4	45	–	–	–	–	–	
Chris Stewart	(Canada)	RW	1	2019–2020	16	0	1	1	21	–	–	–	–	–	
P. J. Stock	(Canada)	C	1	2000–2001	31	1	3	4	78	2	0	0	0	0	
Mike Stothers	(Canada)	D	4	1984–1988	12	0	1	1	23	5	0	0	0	11	
Petr Straka	(Czech Republic)	RW	1	2014–2015	3	0	2	2	0	–	–	–	–	–	
Art Stratton	(Canada)	C	1	1967–1968	12	0	4	4	4	5	0	0	0	0	
Mark Streit	(Switzerland)	D	4	2013–2017	274	30	110	140	120	13	1	3	4	6	
Doug Sulliman	(Canada)	LW	2	1988–1990	80	9	10	19	8	4	0	0	0	0	
Maxim Sushko	(Belarus)	RW	1	2020–2021	2	0	0	0	0	–	–	–	–	–	
Bill Sutherland	(Canada)	LW	4	1967–1971	124	42	29	71	40	11	2	4	6	0	
Rich Sutter	(Canada)	RW	3	1983–1986	204	36	47	83	381	19	5	0	5	44	
Ron Sutter	(Canada)	C	9	1982–1991	555	137	222	359	854	69	6	27	33	149	Captain: 1989–1991
Mark Suzor	(Canada)	D	1	1976–1977	4	0	1	1	4	–	–	–	–	–	
Petr Svoboda	(Czech Republic)	D	5	1994–1999	232	10	60	70	320	45	1	13	14	50	
George Swarbrick	(Canada)	LW	1	1970–1971	2	0	0	0	0	–	–	–	–	–	
Michal Sykora	(Czech Republic)	D	1	2000–2001	49	5	11	16	26	6	0	1	1	0	
Danny Syvret	(Canada)	D	3	2008–2011	27	2	2	4	14	10	0	0	0	0	
Maxime Talbot	(Canada)	C	3	2011–2014	127	25	21	46	84	11	4	2	6	10	
Mark Taylor	(Canada)	C	3	1981–1984	64	8	25	33	24	3	0	0	0	0	
Dmitri Tertyshny	(Russia)	D	1	1998–1999	62	2	8	10	30	1	0	0	0	2	
Chris Therien	(Canada)	D	11	1994–2006	753	29	130	159	583	99	2	10	12	68	
Nate Thompson	(United States)	C	2	2019–2020; 2021–2022	40	1	3	4	40	16	1	0	1	14	
Patrick Thoresen	(Norway)	LW	1	2007–2008	21	0	5	5	8	14	0	2	2	4	
Billy Tibbetts	(United States)	RW	1	2001–2002	9	0	1	1	69	–	–	–	–	–	
Brad Tiley	(Canada)	D	1	2000–2001	2	0	0	0	0	–	–	–	–	–	
Mattias Timander	(Sweden)	D	1	2003–2004	34	1	4	5	19	18	2	4	6	6	
Jussi Timonen	(Finland)	D	1	2006–2007	14	0	4	4	6	–	–	–	–	–	
Kimmo Timonen	(Finland)	D	7	2007–2014	519	38	232	270	304	71	3	26	29	81	
Dave Tippett	(Canada)	C	1	1993–1994	73	4	11	15	38	–	–	–	–	–	
Owen Tippett‡	(Canada)	RW	5	2021–2026	334	107	96	203	78	6	1	1	2	0	
Rick Tocchet	(Canada)	RW	11	1984–1992; 1999–2002	621	232	276	508	1817	95	27	33	60	349	Captain: 1991–1992; FHOF – 2021
Ole-Kristian Tollefsen	(Norway)	D	1	2009–2010	18	0	2	2	23	–	–	–	–	–	
Denis Tolpeko	(Russia)	C	1	2007–2008	26	1	5	6	24	–	–	–	–	–	
Tim Tookey	(Canada)	C	1	1986–1987	2	0	0	0	0	10	1	3	4	2	
Carsen Twarynski	(Canada)	LW	2	2019–2021	22	1	0	1	6	–	–	–	–	–	
R. J. Umberger	(United States)	C	5	2005–2008; 2014–2016	334	60	82	142	112	22	11	5	16	12	
Scottie Upshall	(Canada)	RW	3	2006–2009	134	27	37	64	145	17	3	4	7	44	
Ossi Vaananen	(Finland)	D	1	2008–2009	46	1	9	10	22	–	–	–	–	–	
Ed Van Impe†	(Canada)	D	9	1967–1976	617	19	107	126	892	57	1	11	12	121	Captain: 1968–1973; SC: 1974, 1975; FHOF – 1993
James van Riemsdyk	(United States)	LW	8	2009–2012; 2018–2023	527	146	151	297	182	51	13	4	17	14	
Jim Vandermeer	(Canada)	D	3	2002–2004; 2007–2008	47	5	3	8	52	8	0	1	1	9	
Chris VandeVelde	(United States)	C	4	2013–2017	250	17	28	45	77	6	1	0	1	0	
Phil Varone	(Canada)	C	1	2018–2019	47	3	4	7	8	–	–	–	–	–	
Mike Vecchione	(United States)	C	1	2016–2017	2	0	0	0	0	–	–	–	–	–	
Kris Versteeg	(Canada)	RW	1	2010–2011	27	7	4	11	24	11	1	5	6	12	
Dennis Ververgaert	(Canada)	RW	2	1978–1980	95	23	24	47	30	5	0	2	2	2	
Claude Vilgrain	(Canada)	LW	1	1993–1994	2	0	0	0	0	–	–	–	–	–	
Roman Vopat	(Czech Republic)	C	1	1998–1999	48	0	3	3	80	–	–	–	–	–	
Jakub Voracek	(Czech Republic)	RW	10	2011–2021	727	177	427	604	385	45	9	18	27	46	
Mikhail Vorobyev	(Russia)	C	2	2018–2020	35	2	3	5	8	–	–	–	–	–	
Matt Walker	(Canada)	D	2	2010–2012	8	0	0	0	20	–	–	–	–	–	
Sean Walker	(Canada)	D	1	2023–2024	63	6	16	22	34	–	–	–	–	–	
Wes Walz	(Canada)	C	1	1991–1992	2	1	0	1	0	–	–	–	–	–	
Todd Warriner	(Canada)	LW	1	2002–2003	13	2	3	5	6	–	–	–	–	–	
Steve Washburn	(Canada)	C	2	1999–2001	4	0	0	0	0	–	–	–	–	–	
Jimmy Watson†	(Canada)	D	10	1972–1982	613	38	148	186	492	101	5	34	39	89	SC: 1974, 1975; FHOF – 2016
Joe Watson†	(Canada)	D	11	1967–1978	746	36	162	198	397	84	3	12	15	82	SC: 1974, 1975; FHOF – 1996
Jordan Weal	(Canada)	C	4	2015–2019	124	19	23	42	38	1	0	0	0	0	
Eric Weinrich	(United States)	D	3	2001–2004	215	8	45	53	98	18	2	3	5	16	
Dale Weise	(Canada)	RW	3	2016–2019	152	17	17	34	75	2	0	0	0	0	
Jay Wells	(Canada)	D	2	1988–1990	126	5	35	40	313	18	0	2	2	51	
Eric Wellwood	(Canada)	LW	3	2010–2013	31	5	5	10	4	11	0	0	0	2	
Brian Wesenberg	(Canada)	RW	1	1998–1999	1	0	0	0	5	–	–	–	–	–	
Blake Wesley	(Canada)	D	2	1979–1981	52	3	8	11	109	–	–	–	–	–	
Peter White	(Canada)	C	4	1998–2001; 2003–2004	104	10	21	31	24	19	0	2	2	0	
Ryan White	(Canada)	C	2	2014–2016	107	17	11	28	131	6	1	0	1	28	
Todd White	(Canada)	LW	1	1999–2000	4	1	0	1	0	–	–	–	–	–	
Bob Wilkie	(Canada)	D	1	1993–1994	10	1	3	4	8	–	–	–	–	–	
Gord Williams	(Canada)	RW	2	1981–1983	2	0	0	0	2	–	–	–	–	–	
Justin Williams	(Canada)	RW	4	2000–2004	226	43	72	115	108	17	1	5	6	12	
Max Willman	(United States)	C	2	2021–2023	50	4	2	6	20	–	–	–	–	–	
Behn Wilson	(Canada)	D	5	1978–1983	339	59	155	214	873	43	8	24	32	122	
Garrett Wilson‡	(Canada)	LW	1	2025–2026	3	0	0	0	5	–	–	–	–	–	
Chris Winnes	(United States)	RW	1	1993–1994	4	0	2	2	0	–	–	–	–	–	
Jamie Wright	(Canada)	LW	1	2002–2003	4	0	0	0	4	–	–	–	–	–	
Keith Wright	(Canada)	C	1	1967–1968	1	0	0	0	0	–	–	–	–	–	
Larry Wright	(Canada)	C	3	1971–1973; 1975–1976	38	1	2	3	6	–	–	–	–	–	
Keith Yandle	(United States)	D	1	2021–2022	77	1	18	19	14	–	–	–	–	–	
Cam York‡	(United States)	D	6	2020–2026	309	23	80	103	122	10	1	1	2	6	
Mike York	(United States)	LW	1	2006–2007	34	4	4	8	8	–	–	–	–	–	
Tim Young	(Canada)	C	1	1984–1985	20	2	6	8	12	–	–	–	–	–	
Dmitri Yushkevich	(Russia)	D	4	1992–1995; 2002–2003	215	17	63	80	212	28	2	9	11	14	
Zarley Zalapski	(Canada)	D	1	1999–2000	12	0	2	2	6	–	–	–	–	–	
Egor Zamula‡	(Russia)	D	6	2020–2026	168	8	33	41	48	–	–	–	–	–	
Trevor Zegras‡	(United States)	C	1	2025–2026	81	26	41	67	62	10	2	4	6	26	
Larry Zeidel	(Canada)	D	2	1967–1969	66	1	10	11	74	7	0	1	1	12	
Valeri Zelepukin	(Russia)	RW	2	1998–2000	151	27	30	57	103	22	2	2	4	16	
Jason Zent	(United States)	LW	1	1998–1999	2	0	0	0	0	–	–	–	–	–	
Rob Zettler	(Canada)	D	2	1993–1995	65	0	5	5	103	1	0	0	0	2	
Peter Zezel	(Canada)	C	5	1984–1989	310	91	170	261	230	56	10	21	31	49	
Alexei Zhamnov	(Russia)	C	1	2003–2004	20	5	13	18	14	18	4	10	14	8	
Nikolay Zherdev	(Russia)	RW	1	2010–2011	56	16	6	22	22	8	1	2	3	2	
Alexei Zhitnik	(Russia)	D	1	2006–2007	31	3	10	13	38	–	–	–	–	–	
Harry Zolnierczyk	(Canada)	LW	2	2011–2013	44	3	4	7	71	–	–	–	–	–	
Dainius Zubrus	(Lithuania)	RW	3	1996–1999	200	19	43	62	89	24	5	5	10	14	

== Gallery ==
Played for the Flyers in previous seasons

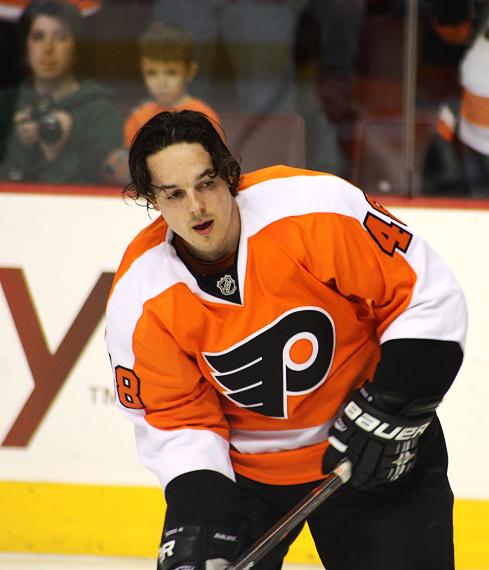
Danny Briere played six seasons for the Flyers.

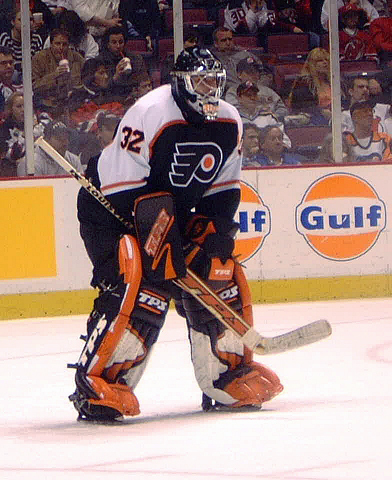
Roman Cechmanek played three seasons for the Flyers.

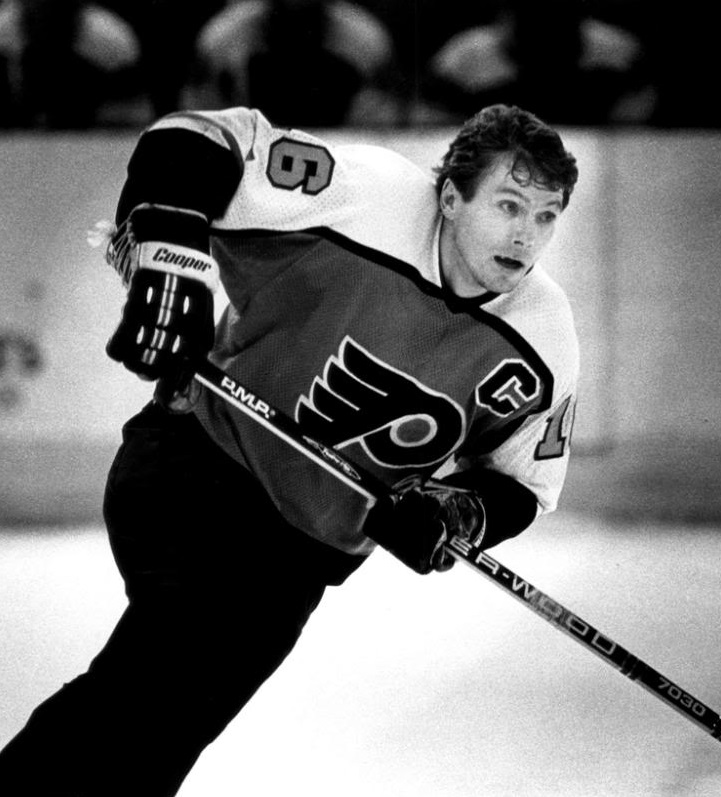
Hockey Hall of Famer Bobby Clarke played his entire NHL career for the Flyers, captaining the team to two Stanley Cup championships.

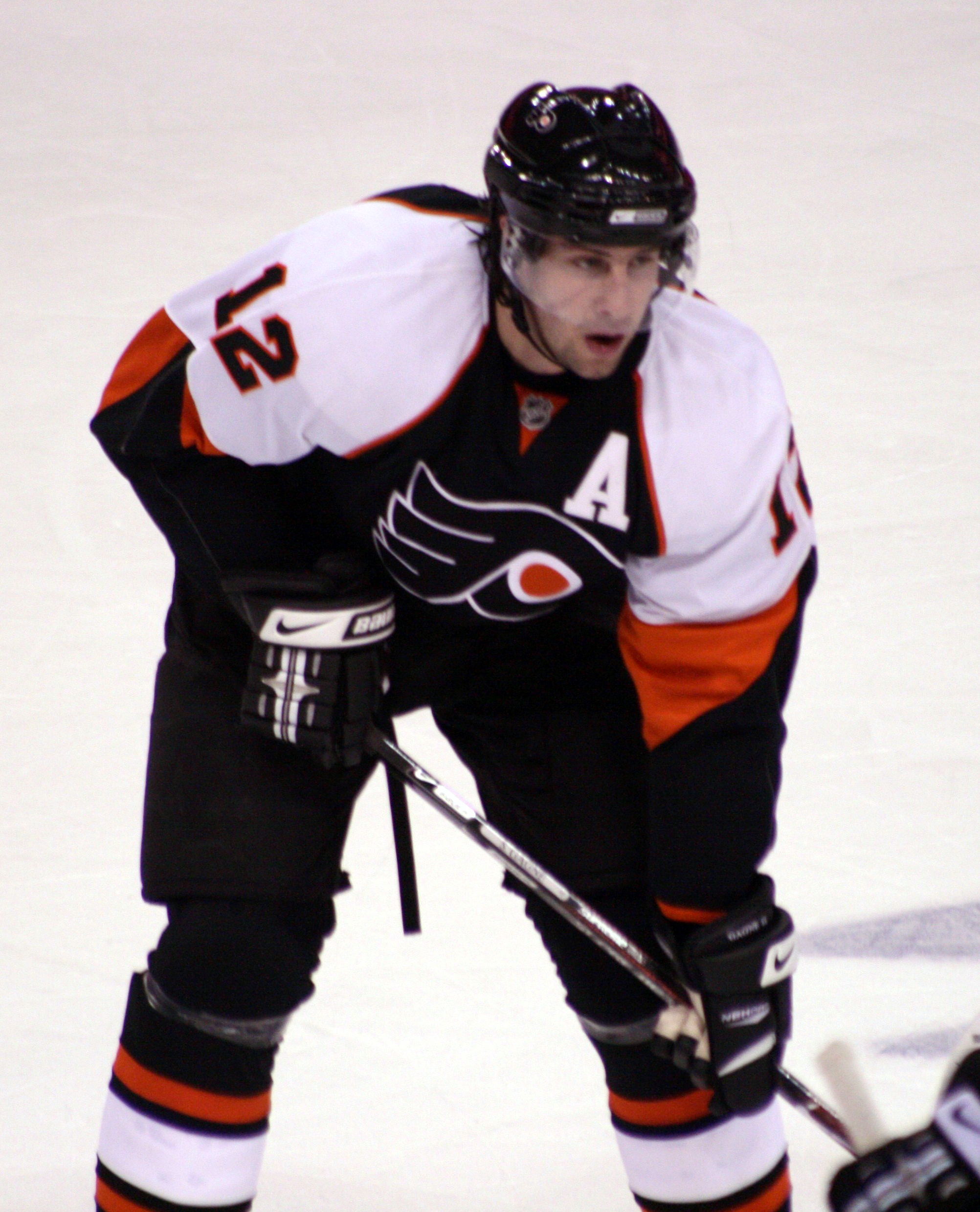
Simon Gagne spent his first ten NHL seasons with the Flyers. A brief second stint brought his total to eleven seasons with the team.

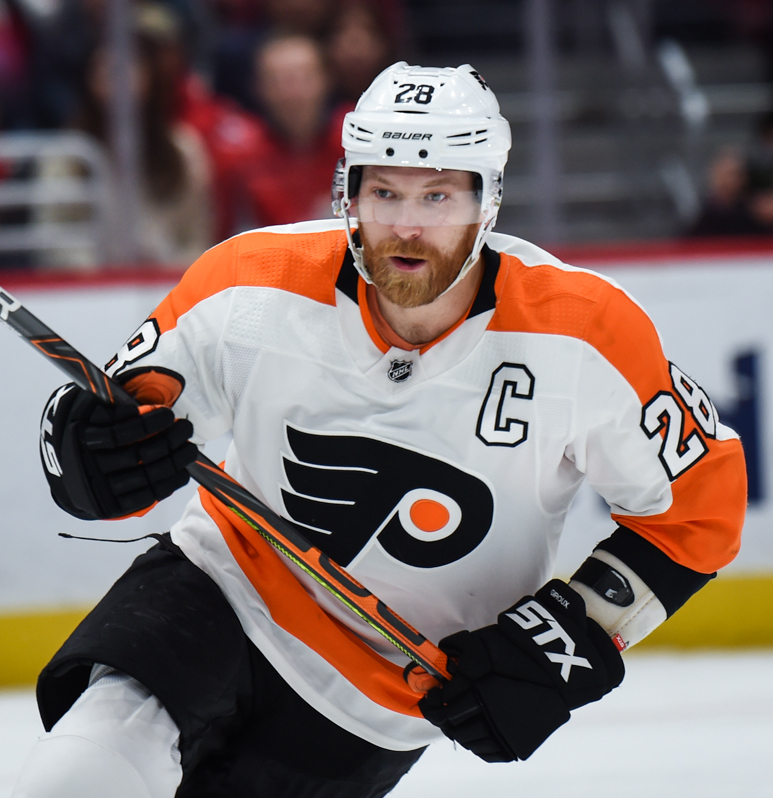
Claude Giroux played fifteen seasons for the Flyers and was the longest serving captain in team history.

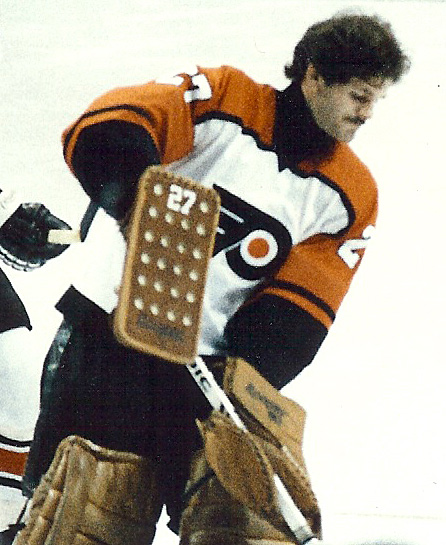
Ron Hextall played eleven seasons for the Flyers.

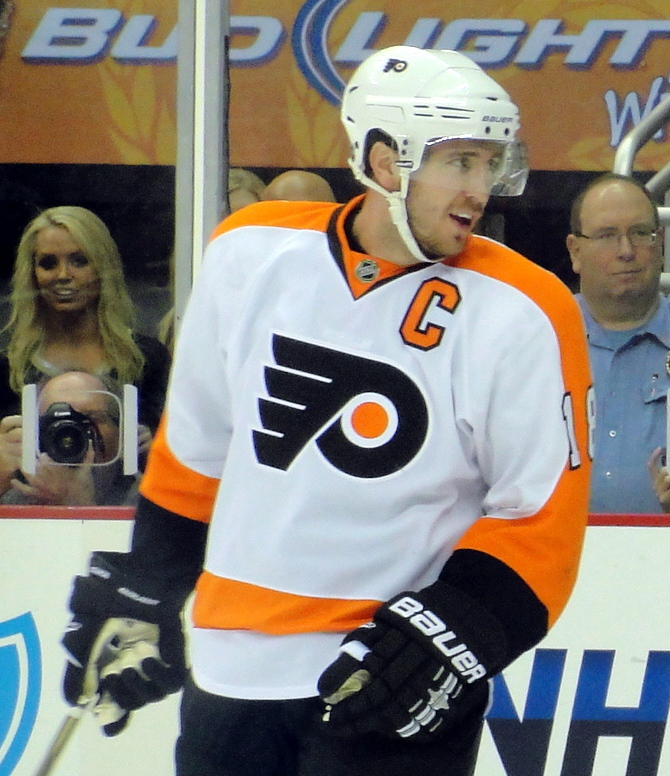
Mike Richards played six seasons for the Flyers and was team captain for three seasons.

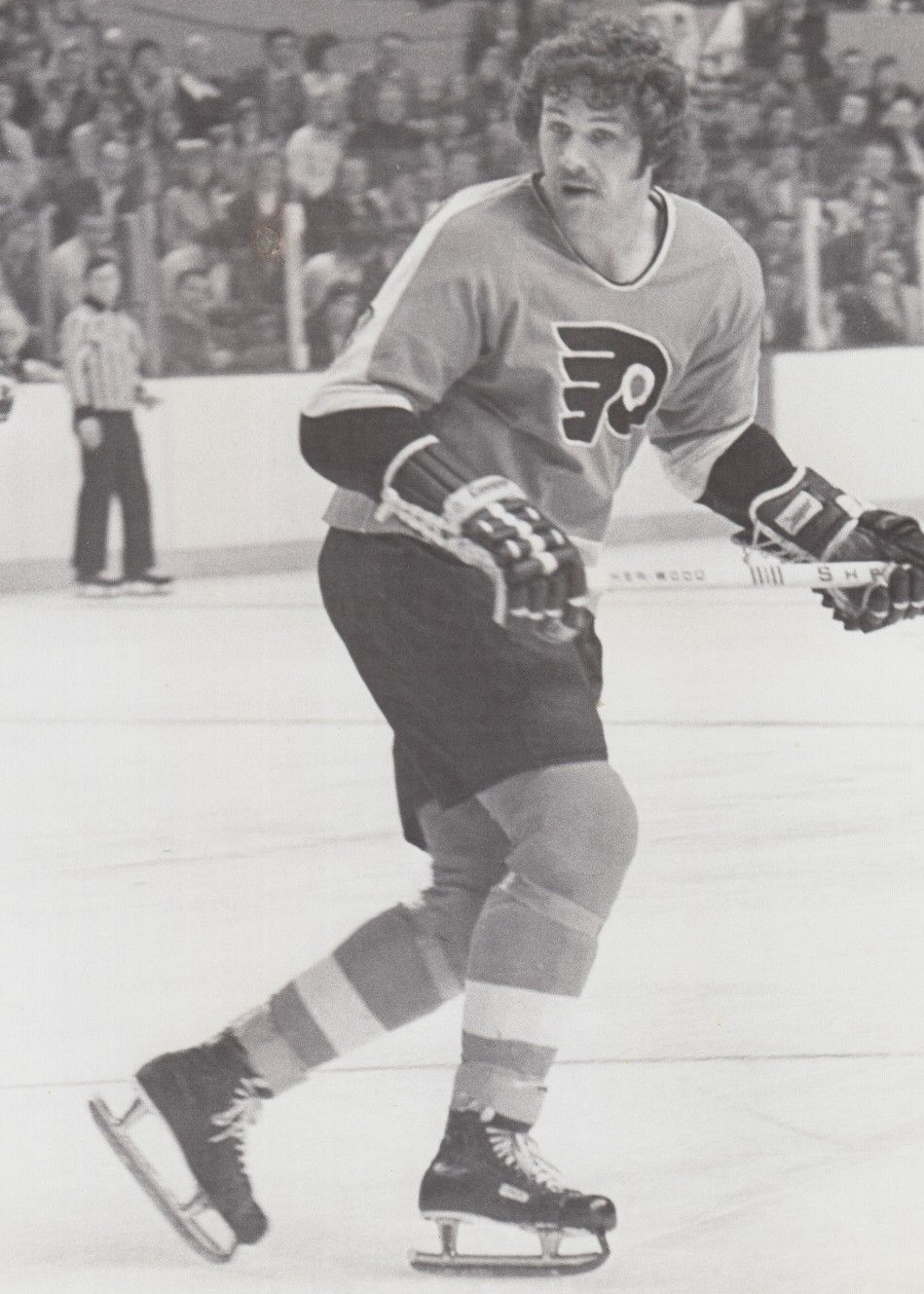
Dave Schultz played five seasons for the Flyers.

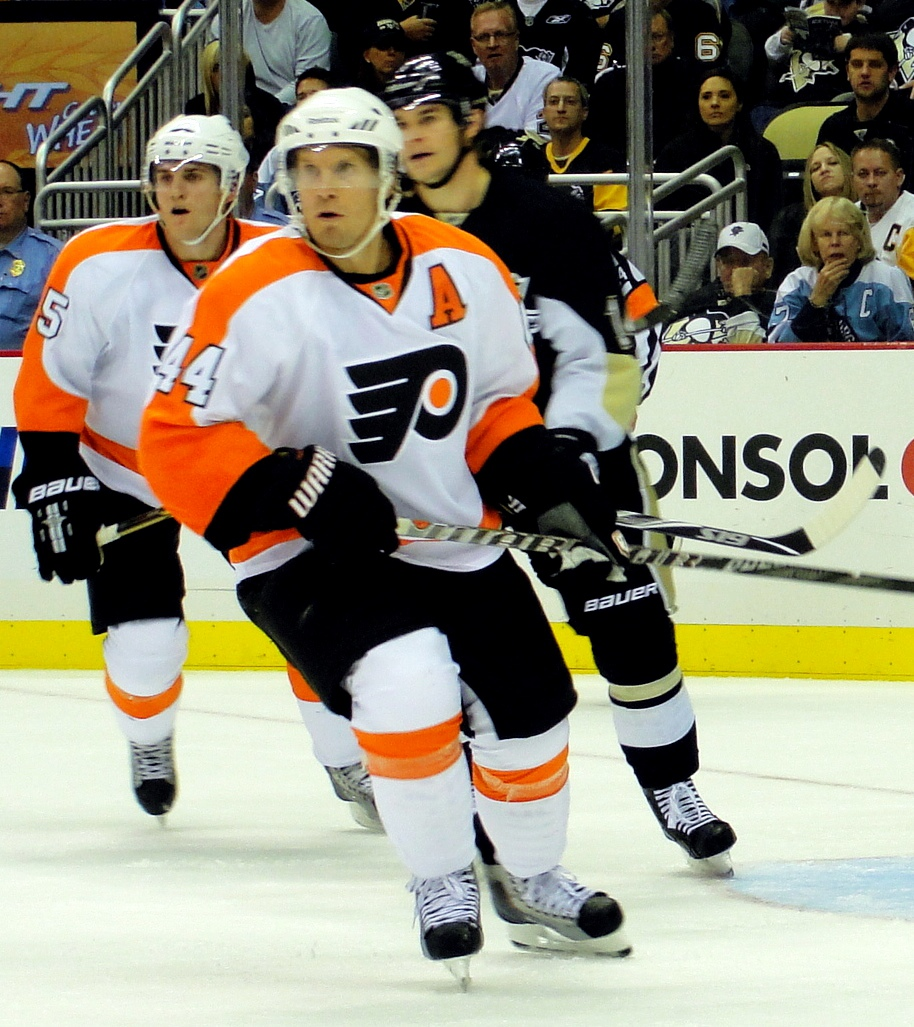
Kimmo Timonen played seven seasons for the Flyers.

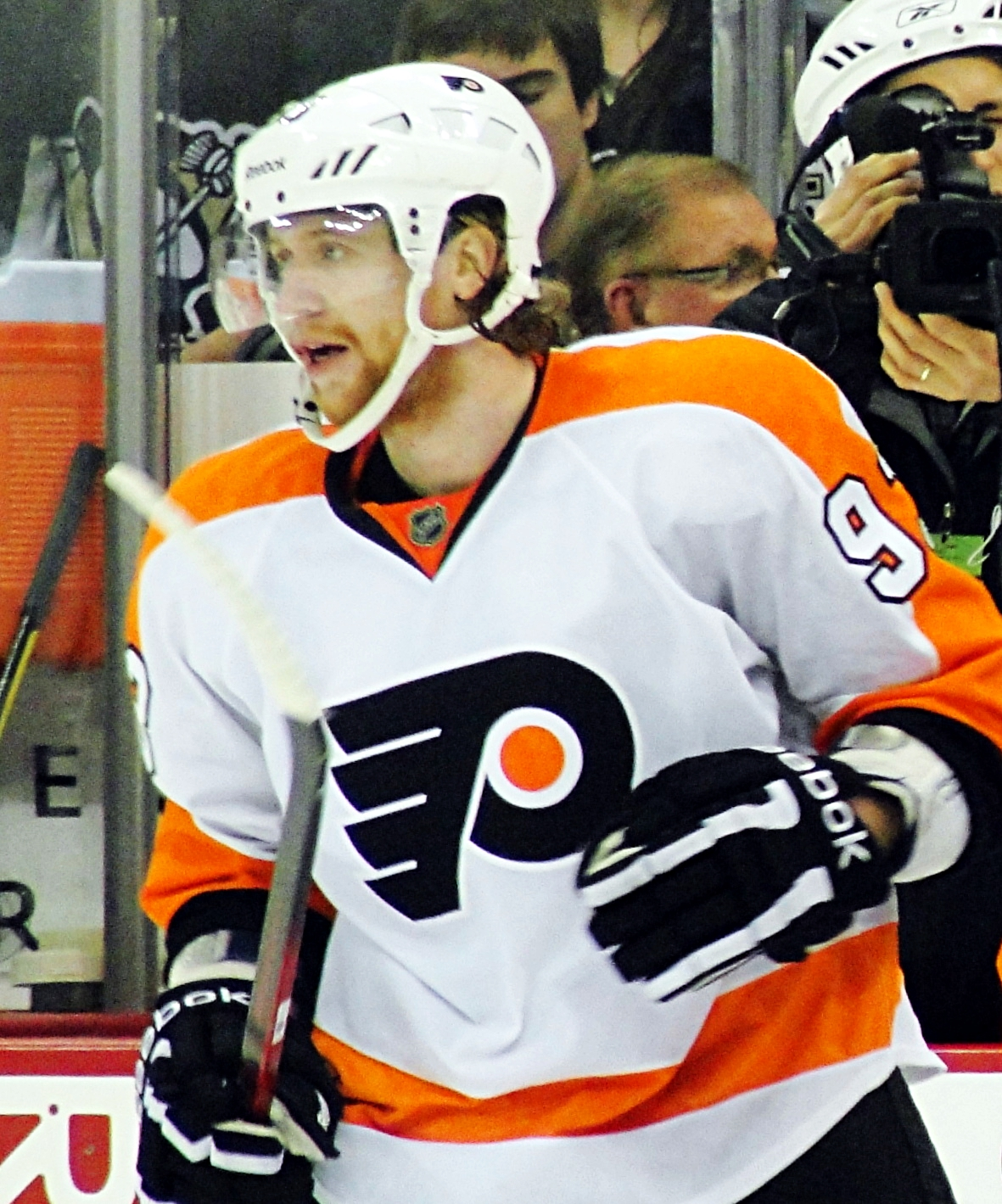
Jakub Voracek played ten seasons for the Flyers.

Played for the Flyers during the most recently completed season

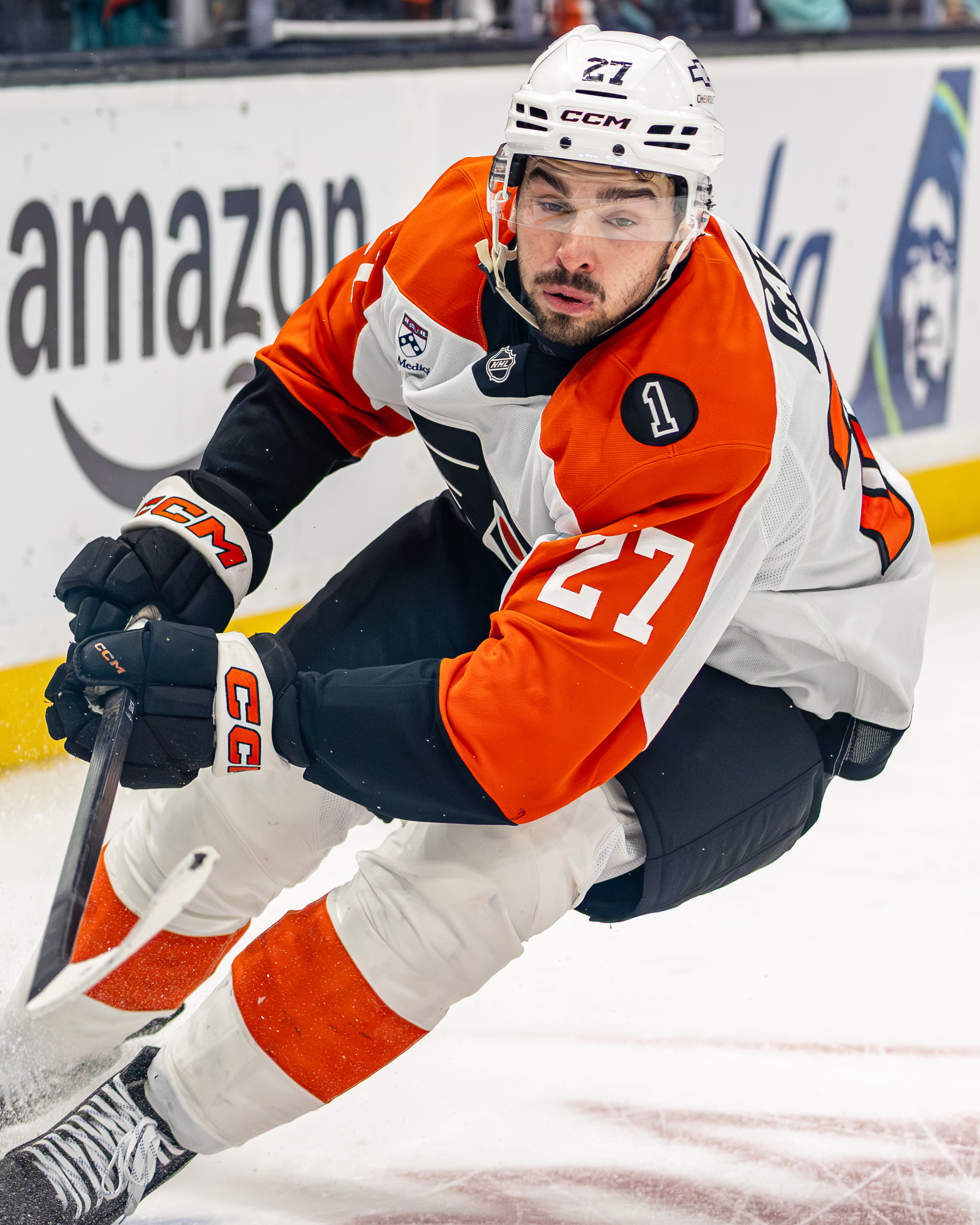
Noah Cates has played for the Flyers since the 2021–22 season.

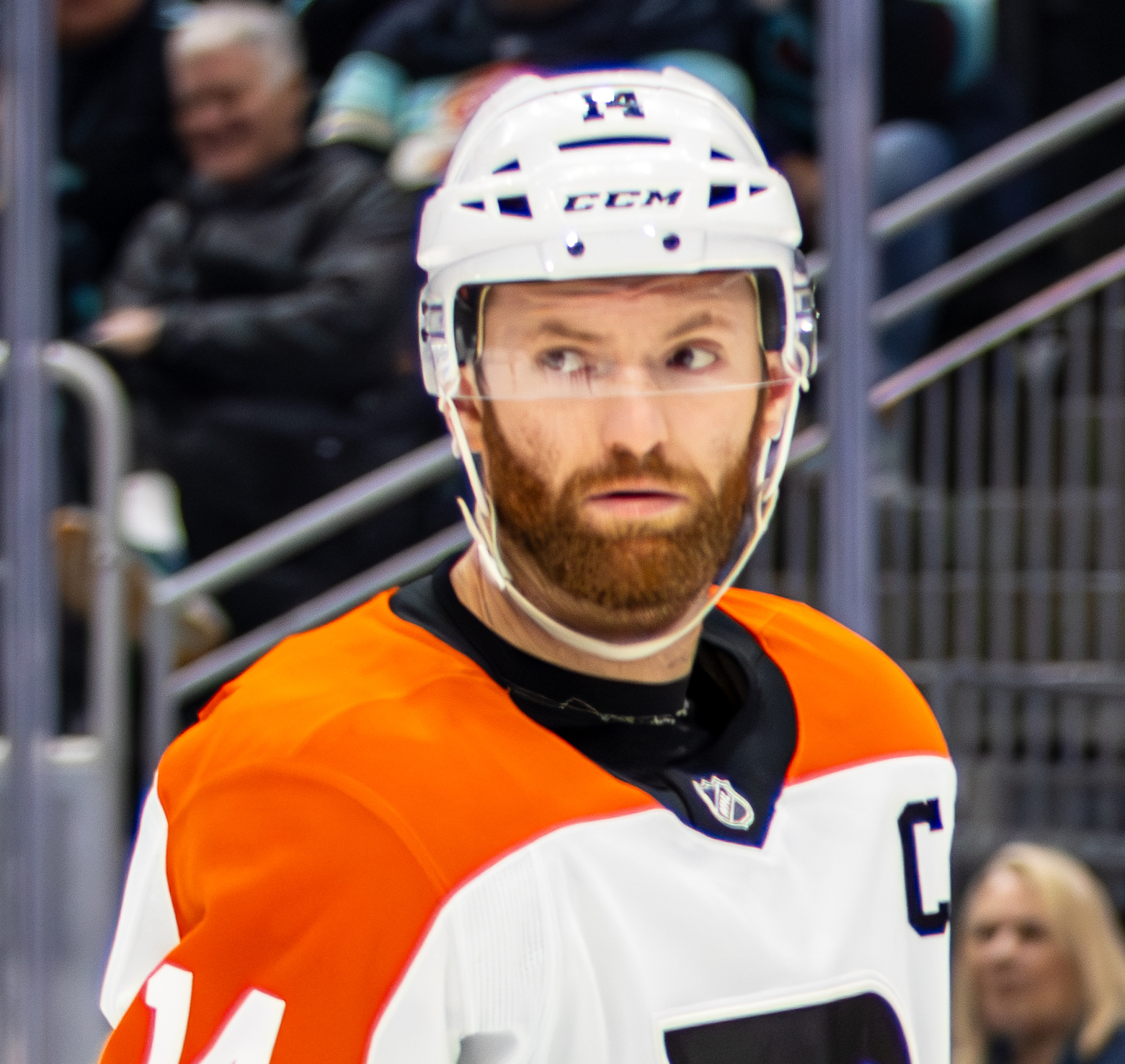
Team captain Sean Couturier has played for the Flyers since the 2011–12 season.

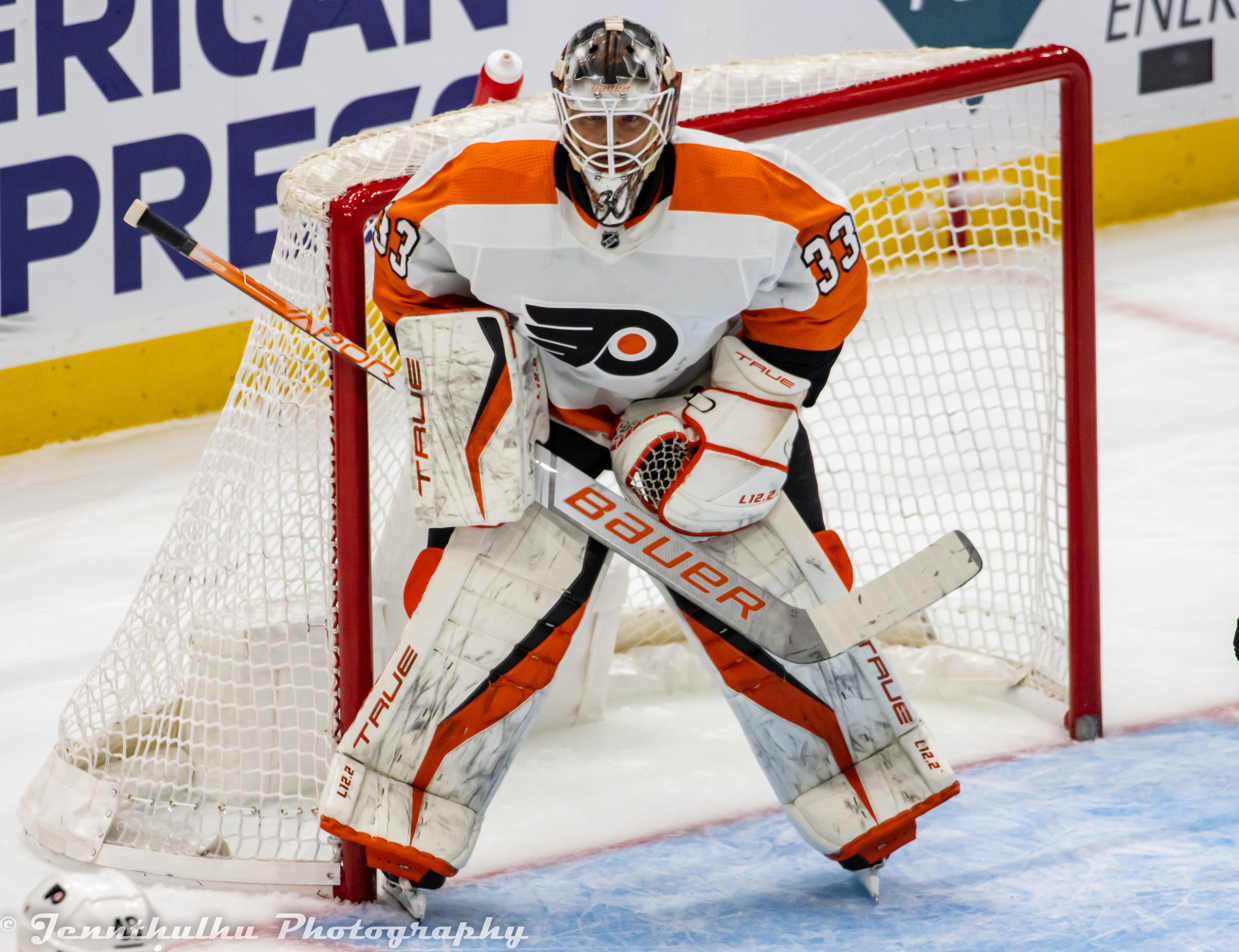
Samuel Ersson played four seasons for the Flyers.

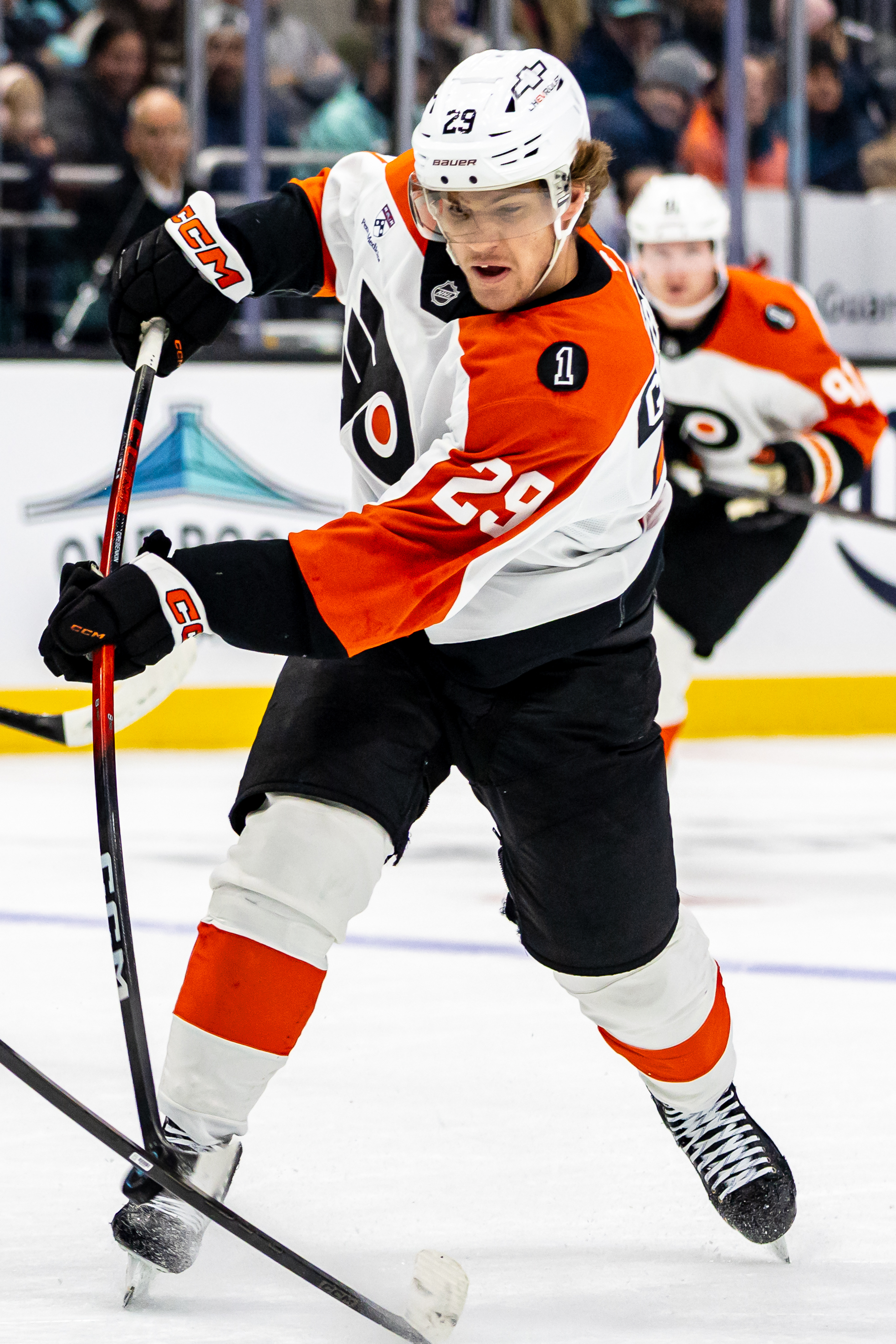
Nikita Grebenkin has played for the Flyers since the 2025–26 season.

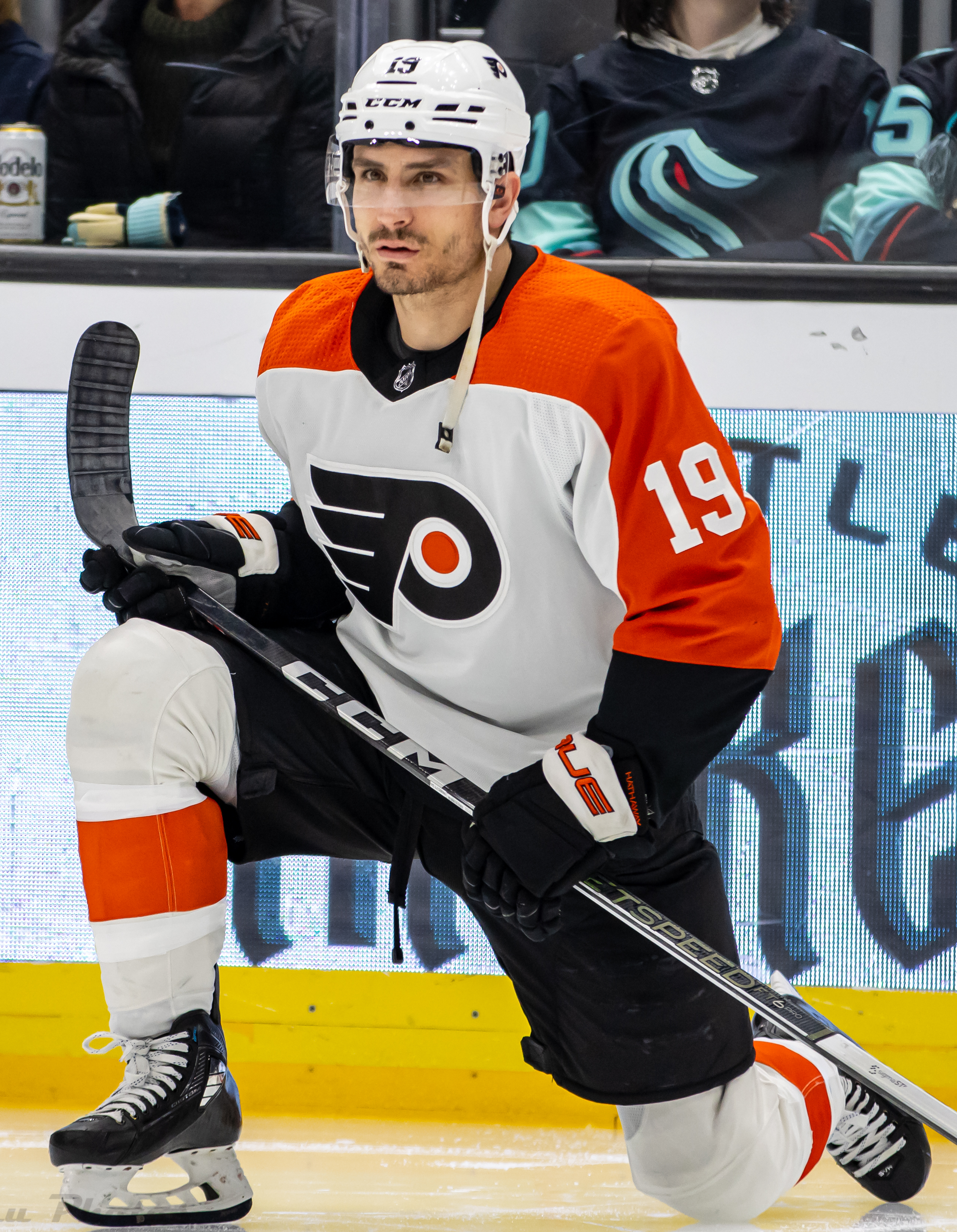
Garnet Hathaway played three seasons for the Flyers.

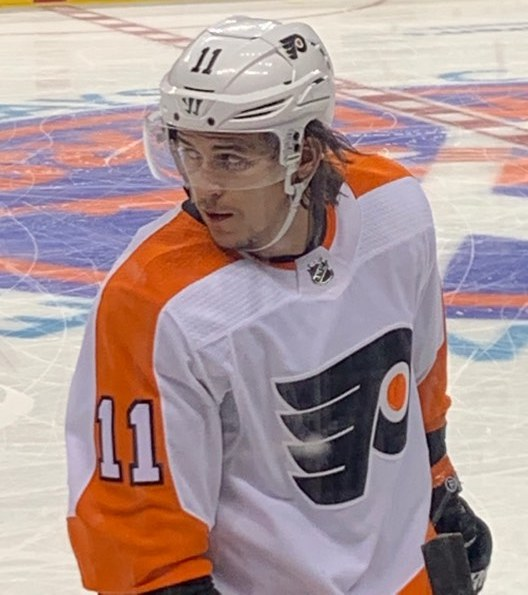
Travis Konecny has played for the Flyers since the 2016–17 season.

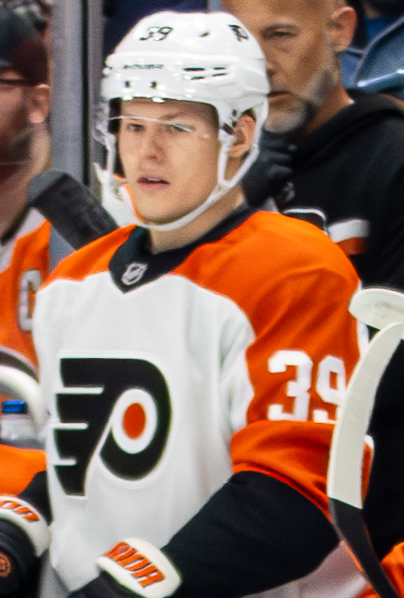
Matvei Michkov has played for the Flyers since the 2024–25 season.

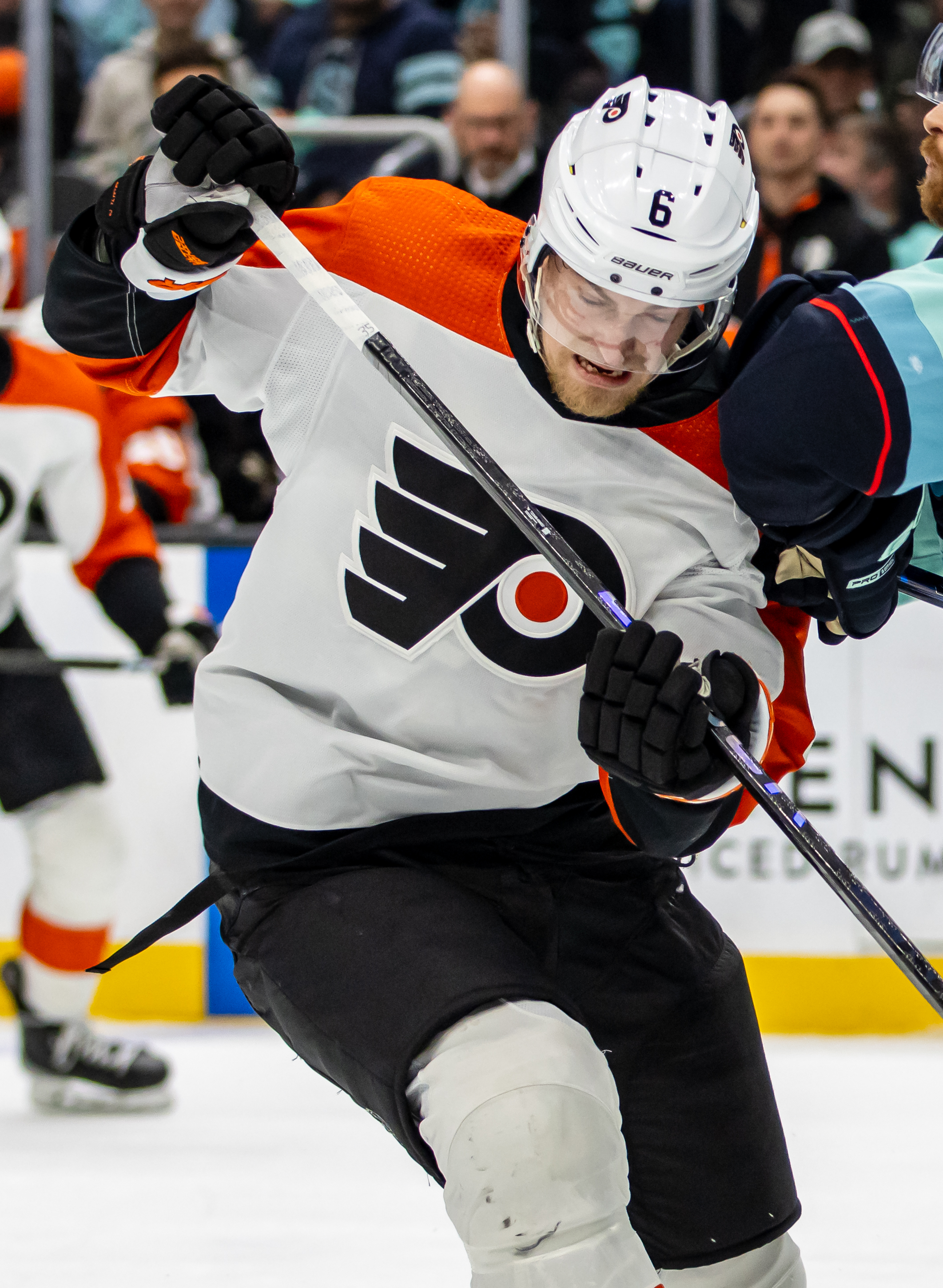
Travis Sanheim has played for the Flyers since the 2017–18 season.

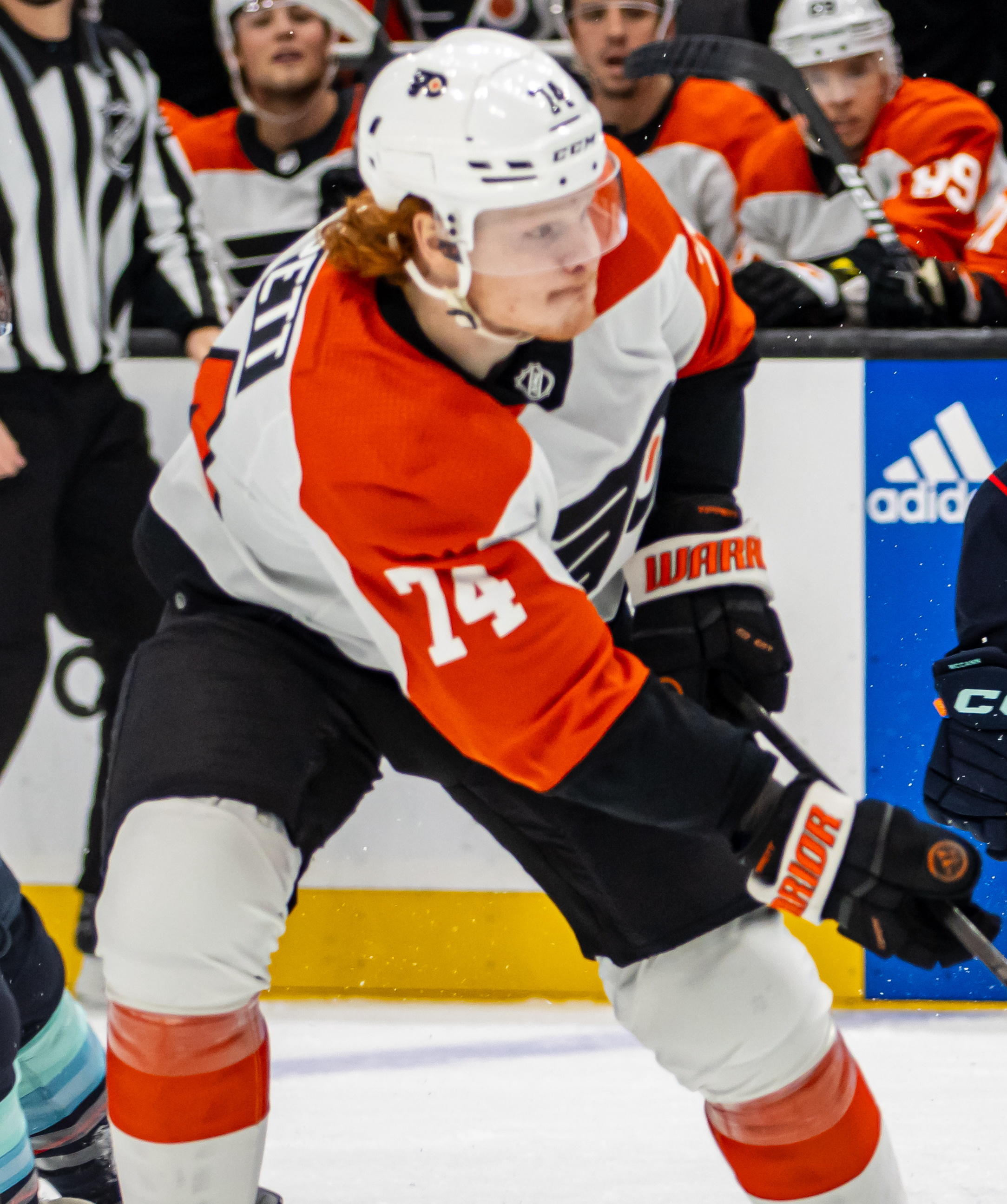
Owen Tippett has played for the Flyers since the 2021–22 season.

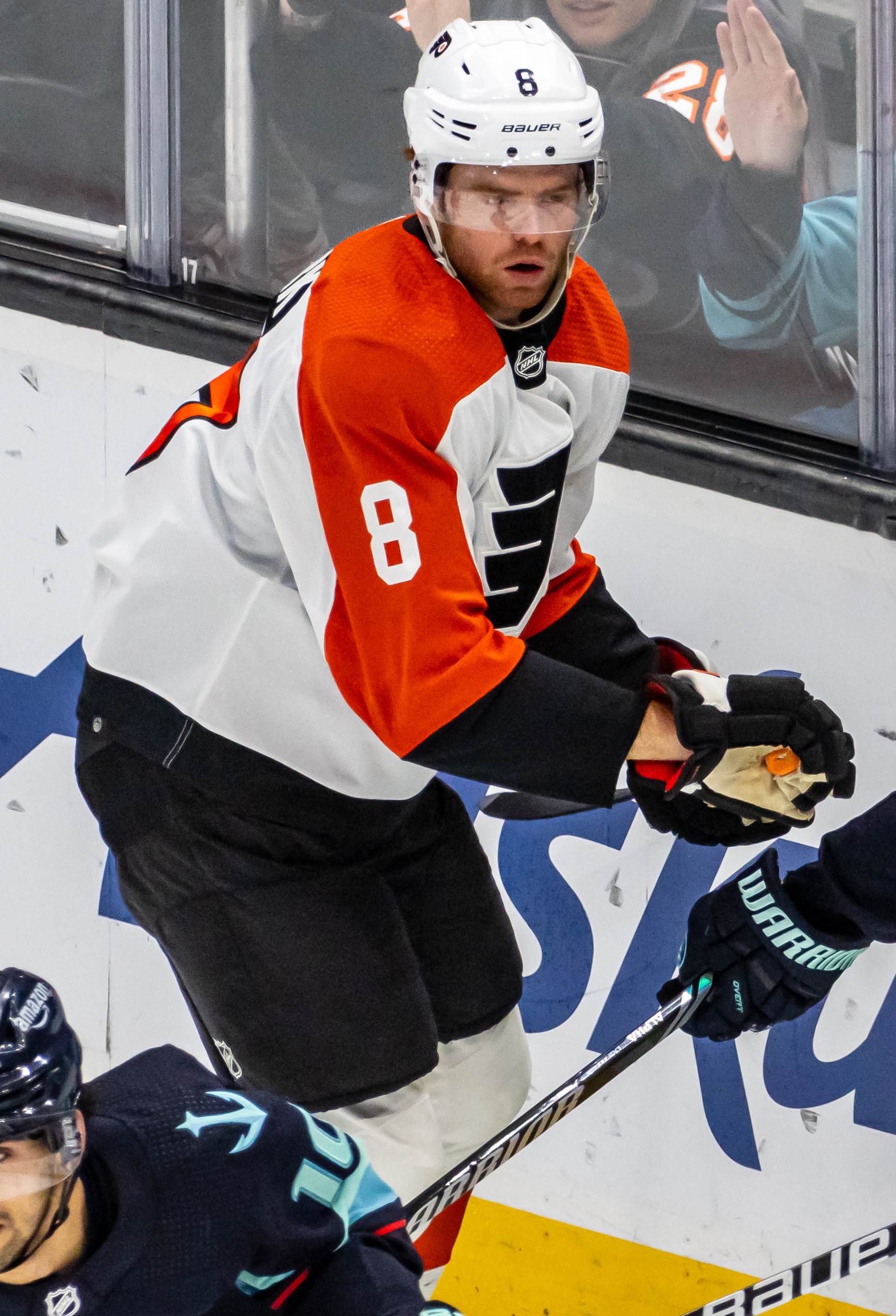
Cam York has played for the Flyers since the 2020–21 season.
