= Ed Stankiewicz =

Canadian ice hockey player (1929–2019)

- Born: November 30, 1929 Kitchener, Ontario, Canada
- Died: September 12, 2019 (aged 89) Kitchener, Ontario, Canada
- Height: 5 ft 9 in (175 cm)
- Weight: 165 lb (75 kg; 11 st 11 lb)
- Position: Right wing
- Shot: Right
- Played for: Detroit Red Wings
- Playing career: 1951–1965

Edward George "Stanky" Stankiewicz (November 30, 1929 – September 12, 2019) was a Canadian professional ice hockey player. He played six games in the National Hockey League with the Detroit Red Wings between 1954 and 1955. He spent the rest of his career, from 1951 to 1965, in the minor leagues. He was the brother of Myron Stankiewicz, a pro hockey left winger who also played in the NHL.

== Early life ==
Stankiewicz was born November 30, 1929 in Kitchener, Ontario to Polish immigrant parents. The first of his parents' children to be born in Canada, Stankiewicz received his first pair of skates at 10 years of age. His brother Myron Stankiewicz played 35 games in the NHL with the Philadelphia Flyers and the St. Louis Blues during the 1968-1969 season.

== Later life and death ==
Stankiewicz spent time coaching in Austria and was a scout for the New York Islanders before retiring in Waterloo Ontario. He died September 12, 2019 at the age of 89.

== Career statistics ==
=== Regular season and playoffs ===
			Regular season					Playoffs
Season	Team	League	GP	G	A	Pts	PIM	GP	G	A	Pts	PIM
1949–50	Windsor Spitfires	OHA	47	54	48	102	48	11	6	11	17	23
1950–51	Toronto Marlboros	OHA	32	7	17	24	42	3	0	0	0	6
1951–52	Kitchener-Waterloo Dutchmen	OHA Sr	48	41	46	87	34	5	1	3	4	11
1951–52	St. Louis Flyers	AHL	2	2	2	4	0	—	—	—	—	—
1952–53	St. Louis Flyers	AHL	61	13	25	38	48	—	—	—	—	—
1953–54	Detroit Red Wings	NHL	1	0	0	0	2	—	—	—	—	—
1953–54	Sherbrooke Saints	QSHL	71	30	31	61	67	5	1	1	2	2
1954–55	Edmonton Flyers	WHL	59	27	45	72	96	9	1	5	6	28
1955–56	Detroit Red Wings	NHL	5	0	0	0	0	—	—	—	—	—
1955–56	Edmonton Flyers	WHL	54	33	30	63	54	3	2	0	2	4
1956–57	Edmonton Flyers	WHL	16	2	8	10	26	—	—	—	—	—
1957–58	Hershey Bears	AHL	65	13	19	32	56	11	3	1	4	18
1958–59	Hershey Bears	AHL	59	16	17	33	88	13	5	2	7	34
1959–60	Spokane Comets	WHL	69	19	27	46	56	—	—	—	—	—
1959–60	Seattle Totems	WHL	11	—	—	—	—	—	—	—	—	—
1960–61	Spokane Comets	WHL	4	1	0	1	10	—	—	—	—	—
1960–61	Seattle Totems	WHL	62	18	20	38	63	11	1	2	3	21
1961–62	Sudbury Wolves	EPHL	69	31	24	55	86	5	3	0	3	8
1962–63	Los Angeles Blades	WHL	56	9	15	24	82	—	—	—	—	—
1963–64	Long Island Ducks	EHL	67	34	34	68	94	5	1	1	2	23
1964–65	Long Island Ducks	EHL	71	48	47	95	84	15	2	4	6	18
WHL totals			331	109	145	254	387	23	4	7	11	53
NHL totals			6	0	0	0	2	—	—	—	—	—
