= Myron Stankiewicz =

Canadian ice hockey player (1935–2024)

- Born: December 4, 1935 Kitchener, Ontario, Canada
- Died: September 11, 2024 (aged 88) London, Ontario, Canada
- Height: 5 ft 11 in (180 cm)
- Weight: 185 lb (84 kg; 13 st 3 lb)
- Position: Left wing
- Shot: Left
- Played for: St. Louis Blues; Philadelphia Flyers
- Playing career: 1955–1969

Myron "Mike" Joseph Stankiewicz (December 4, 1935 – September 11, 2024) was a Canadian professional ice hockey player. He played 35 games in the National Hockey League with the St. Louis Blues and Philadelphia Flyers during the 1968–69 season. The rest of his career, which lasted from 1955 to 1969, was spent in the minor leagues. He announced his retirement on September 14, 1970, after missing the entire 1969–70 season due to injury. Despite his brief NHL career, Stankiewicz was a top goal scorer in the American Hockey League, breaking the 20-goal mark six times in seven seasons with the Hershey Bears. He is the brother of Ed Stankiewicz, a pro hockey left winger who played 6 games in the NHL. Myron Stankiewicz died in London, Ontario on September 11, 2024, at the age of 88.

== Career statistics ==
=== Regular season and playoffs ===
			Regular season					Playoffs
Season	Team	League	GP	G	A	Pts	PIM	GP	G	A	Pts	PIM
1952–53	Kitchener Greenshirts	OHA	18	0	3	3	2	—	—	—	—	—
1953–54	Barrie Flyers	OHA	19	0	6	6	0	—	—	—	—	—
1954–55	Galt Black Hawks	OHA	40	8	10	18	52	4	0	0	0	9
1955–56	Indianapolis Chiefs	IHL	54	16	10	26	76	—	—	—	—	—
1956–57	Indianapolis Chiefs	IHL	58	16	16	32	52	6	0	0	0	4
1957–58	Indianapolis Chiefs	IHL	63	25	36	61	58	11	2	4	6	12
1958–59	Quebec Aces	QSHL	20	4	2	6	6	—	—	—	—	—
1958–59	Edmonton Flyers	WHL	35	4	11	15	19	—	—	—	—	—
1959–60	Quebec Aces	AHL	62	10	11	21	66	—	—	—	—	—
1960–61	Sudbury Wolves	EPHL	37	9	10	19	27	—	—	—	—	—
1960–61	Hershey Bears	AHL	33	2	11	13	39	—	—	—	—	—
1961–62	Hershey Bears	AHL	70	20	33	53	66	7	2	2	4	4
1962–63	Hershey Bears	AHL	68	21	43	64	30	15	3	4	7	21
1963–64	Hershey Bears	AHL	72	25	41	66	65	6	1	1	2	21
1964–65	Hershey Bears	AHL	71	28	36	64	59	15	2	6	8	16
1965–66	Hershey Bears	AHL	72	28	30	58	53	3	1	0	1	2
1966–67	Hershey Bears	AHL	70	8	23	31	42	4	1	0	1	5
1967–68	Hershey Bears	AHL	65	23	27	50	49	1	0	0	0	0
1968–69	St. Louis Blues	NHL	16	0	2	2	11	—	—	—	—	—
1968–69	Philadelphia Flyers	NHL	19	0	5	5	25	1	0	0	0	0
1968–69	Omaha Knights	CHL	5	1	2	3	8	—	—	—	—	—
1968–69	Quebec Aces	AHL	15	6	6	12	5	15	5	8	13	10
AHL totals			598	171	261	432	474	66	15	21	36	79
NHL totals			35	0	7	7	36	1	0	0	0	0
