= List of Philadelphia Flyers award winners =

Philadelphia Flyers awards
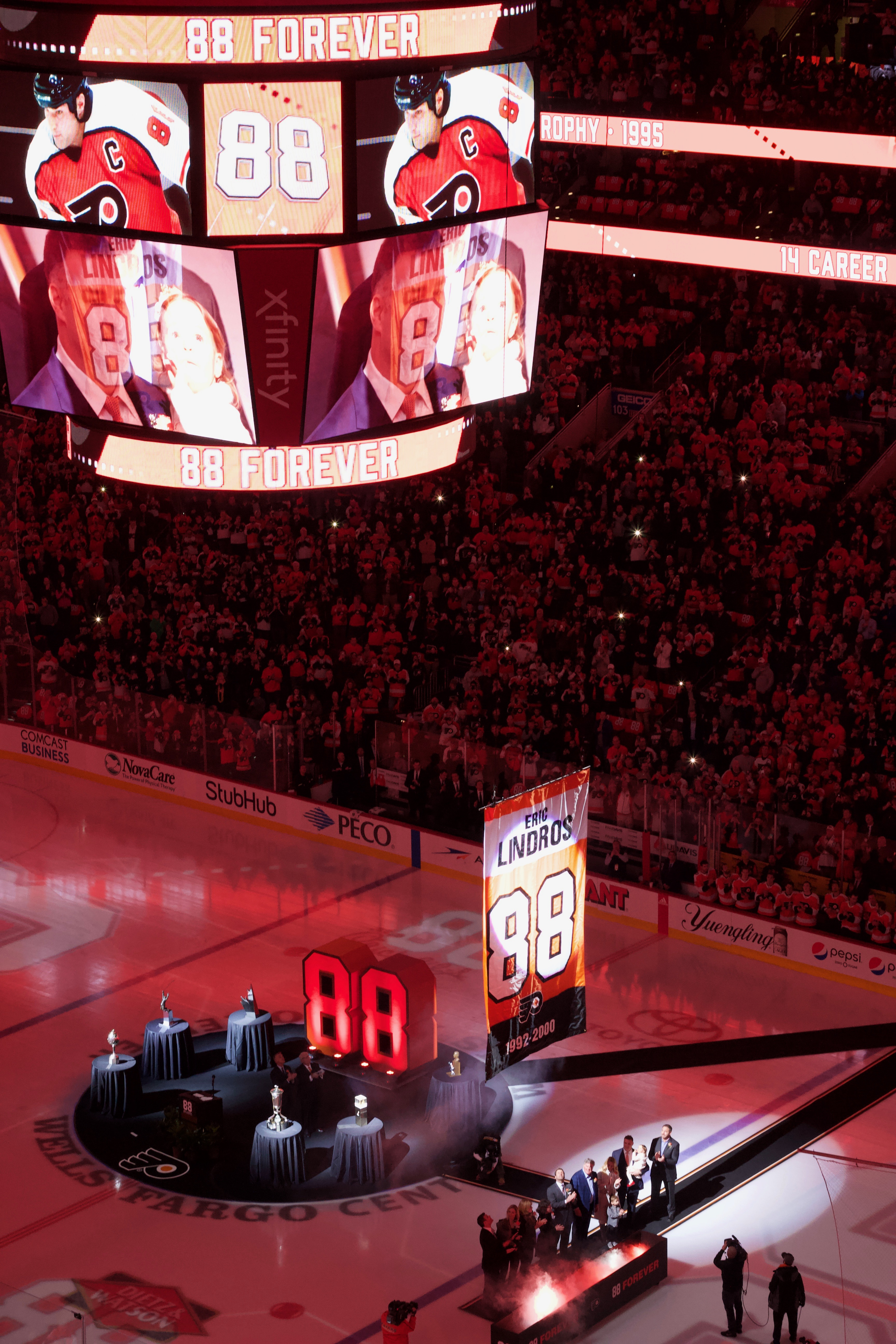
- Ceremony retiring Eric Lindros' number in 2018. Several awards – including the Hart Memorial Trophy and Prince of Wales Trophy – are visible at center ice.

Team trophies
- Award*: Wins
- Stanley Cup: 2
- Clarence S. Campbell Bowl: 6
- Prince of Wales Trophy: 4

Individual awards
- Award*: Wins
- Bill Masterton Memorial Trophy: 4
- Conn Smythe Trophy: 4
- Frank J. Selke Trophy: 3
- Hart Memorial Trophy: 4
- Jack Adams Award: 4
- Lester Patrick Trophy: 8
- NHL Plus-Minus Award: 3
- Ted Lindsay Award: 2
- Vezina Trophy: 4
- William M. Jennings Trophy: 2

Total
- Awards won: 50

The Philadelphia Flyers are a professional ice hockey team based in Philadelphia. They are members of the Metropolitan Division of the National Hockey League's (NHL) Eastern Conference. The Flyers were founded in 1967 as one of six expansion teams, increasing the size of the NHL at that time to 12 teams.

Since the franchise was established, the team has won the Stanley Cup two times as league champions in 1974 and 1975, the Clarence S. Campbell Bowl six times – twice as division champions and four times as conference champions – and the Prince of Wales Trophy as conference champions four times. Prior to the Presidents' Trophy first being award in 1985–86, the Flyers led the league in points three times in 1974–75, 1979–80, and 1984–85, but have not led the league in points at the end of the regular season since.

Only Bobby Clarke and Eric Lindros have won regular season most valuable player honors as Flyers. Clarke won the Hart Memorial Trophy three times in 1972–73, 1974–75 and 1975–76 while Lindros won in 1994–95. Both Clarke and Lindros also won the Lester B. Pearson Award, awarded to the most outstanding player as voted by the players and now known as the Ted Lindsay Award, Clarke in 1973–74 and Lindros in 1994–95. Four Flyers players have won the Conn Smythe Trophy as the most valuable player of the playoffs, twice when the Flyers won the Stanley Cup – Bernie Parent in 1974 and 1975 – and twice when they lost in the finals – Reggie Leach in 1976 and Ron Hextall in 1987. Parent and Hextall account for two of the three Flyers goaltenders to win the Vezina Trophy, Parent in 1973–74 and 1974–75, Pelle Lindbergh in 1984–85, and Hextall in 1986–87.

Twenty-one people – fourteen players and seven builders – who spent time with the Flyers have been inducted into the Hockey Hall of Fame. The Flyers have inducted thirty people into a team hall of fame since 1988 and six of those inductees have also had their numbers retired.

== League awards ==
=== Team trophies ===
The Flyers won the Stanley Cup as league champions in back-to-back years during the mid-1970s. They have not won the Cup since despite six return trips to the Stanley Cup Final. They won the Clarence S. Campbell Bowl six times, twice as West Division champions and four times as Campbell Conference regular season champions. Realignment after the 1980–81 season moved the Flyers to the Wales Conference (known as the Eastern Conference since the 1993–94 season) and they have since won the trophy given to the conference's playoff champion, the Prince of Wales Trophy, four times. The Flyers have never won the Presidents' Trophy which has been given to the team finishing the regular season with the best overall record based on points since the 1985–86 season. Prior to the creation of the trophy the Flyers led the league in points three times for the 1974–75, 1979–80, and 1984–85 seasons.

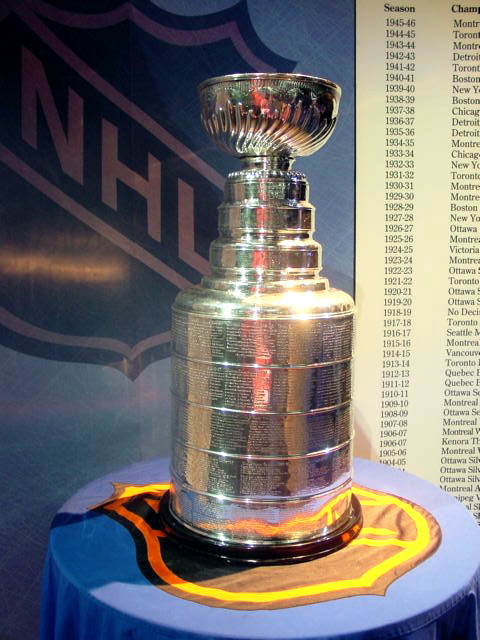
The Flyers have won the Stanley Cup two times.

Team trophies awarded to the Philadelphia Flyers
Award	Description	Times won	Seasons	References
Stanley Cup	NHL championship	2	1973–74, 1974–75	
Clarence S. Campbell Bowl	West Division champions (1967–1974)	2	1967–68, 1973–74	
Clarence S. Campbell Bowl	Campbell Conference regular season championship (1974–1981)	4	1974–75, 1975–76, 1976–77, 1979–80	
Prince of Wales Trophy	Wales/Eastern Conference playoff championship (1981–present)	4	1984–85, 1986–87, 1996–97, 2009–10	

=== Individual awards ===
Twenty-one Flyers players or coaches have received thirty annual individual awards from the league, most occurring during the 1970s and 1980s. The most frequently won awards include the Bill Masterton Memorial Trophy, Conn Smythe Trophy, Hart Memorial Trophy, Jack Adams Award, and the Vezina Trophy, each won four times by Flyers players or coaches. Bobby Clarke's three Hart Trophy wins is the most of any Flyers player or coach of one particular award.

A few highly coveted NHL awards have never been won by Flyers players and occasionally they have been on the losing end of some close calls for them. Mark Howe finished as runner-up three times during the 1980s in voting for the James Norris Memorial Trophy, which is awarded to the defenseman who demonstrates throughout the season the greatest all-round ability in the position. During their respective rookie seasons, Bill Barber (1972–73), Ron Hextall (1986–87), and Shayne Gostisbehere (2015–16) finished second in voting for the Calder Memorial Trophy, given to the league's most outstanding rookie player. During the 1994–95 season Eric Lindros finished tied for the league's scoring title with Pittsburgh Penguins forward Jaromir Jagr. However, Jagr was awarded the Art Ross Trophy, given to the league's regular season scoring champion, due to the first tiebreaker being the player with the most goals, Jagr having scored 32 goals compared to Lindros' 29.

In the case of the Lady Byng Memorial Trophy, awarded to the player who exhibits outstanding sportsmanship and gentlemanly conduct combined with a high standard of playing ability, no Flyers player has ever finished in the top three in the voting for it. Due to their history as the Broad Street Bullies during the 1970s it has been suggested the Lady Byng is not an award Flyers players covet. Dave Brown, who was an enforcer with the team during the 1980s and 1990s, went so far as to say the only way he would ever win the award is "if they renamed it the Man Byng."

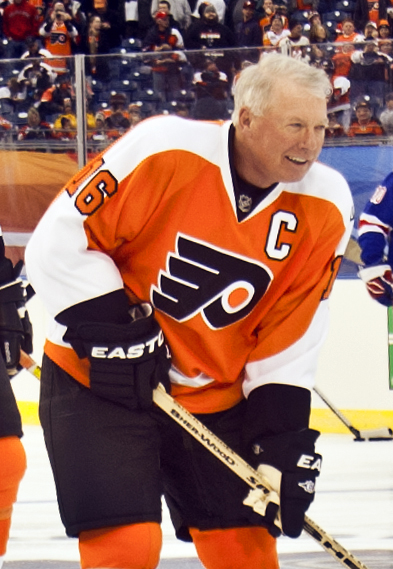
Bobby Clarke spent his entire Hockey Hall of Fame career with the Flyers, winning three Hart Trophies as league MVP as well as several other awards and honors.

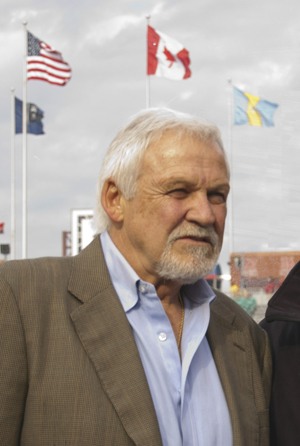
During both of the Flyers two Stanley Cup championship seasons, Bernie Parent won the Vezina Trophy, the Conn Smythe Trophy, and was a season-ending First Team All-Star.

Individual awards won by Philadelphia Flyers players and staff
Award	Description	Winner	Season	References
Bill Masterton Memorial Trophy	Perseverance, sportsmanship, and dedication to hockey	Bobby Clarke	1971–72	
Bill Masterton Memorial Trophy	Perseverance, sportsmanship, and dedication to hockey	Tim Kerr	1988–89	
Bill Masterton Memorial Trophy	Perseverance, sportsmanship, and dedication to hockey	Ian Laperriere	2010–11	
Bill Masterton Memorial Trophy	Perseverance, sportsmanship, and dedication to hockey	Oskar Lindblom	2020–21	
Conn Smythe Trophy	Most valuable player of the playoffs	Bernie Parent	1973–74	
Conn Smythe Trophy	Most valuable player of the playoffs	Bernie Parent	1974–75	
Conn Smythe Trophy	Most valuable player of the playoffs	Reggie Leach	1975–76	
Conn Smythe Trophy	Most valuable player of the playoffs	Ron Hextall	1986–87	
Frank J. Selke Trophy	Forward who best excels in the defensive aspect of the game	Bobby Clarke	1982–83	
Frank J. Selke Trophy	Forward who best excels in the defensive aspect of the game	Dave Poulin	1986–87	
Frank J. Selke Trophy	Forward who best excels in the defensive aspect of the game	Sean Couturier	2019–20	
Hart Memorial Trophy	Most valuable player during the regular season	Bobby Clarke	1972–73	
Hart Memorial Trophy	Most valuable player during the regular season	Bobby Clarke	1974–75	
Hart Memorial Trophy	Most valuable player during the regular season	Bobby Clarke	1975–76	
Hart Memorial Trophy	Most valuable player during the regular season	Eric Lindros	1994–95	
Jack Adams Award	Top coach during the regular season	Fred Shero	1973–74	
Jack Adams Award	Top coach during the regular season	Pat Quinn	1979–80	
Jack Adams Award	Top coach during the regular season	Mike Keenan	1984–85	
Jack Adams Award	Top coach during the regular season	Bill Barber	2000–01	
NHL Plus-Minus Award	Highest plus/minus	Mark Howe	1985–86	
NHL Plus-Minus Award	Highest plus/minus	John LeClair	1996–97	
NHL Plus-Minus Award	Highest plus/minus	John LeClair	1998–99	
Ted Lindsay Award	Most outstanding player during the regular season	Bobby Clarke	1973–74	
Ted Lindsay Award	Most outstanding player during the regular season	Eric Lindros	1994–95	
Vezina Trophy	Fewest goals given up in the regular season (1927–1981)	Bernie Parent	1973–74	
Vezina Trophy	Fewest goals given up in the regular season (1927–1981)	Bernie Parent	1974–75	
Vezina Trophy	Top goaltender (1981–present)	Pelle Lindbergh	1984–85	
Vezina Trophy	Top goaltender (1981–present)	Ron Hextall	1986–87	
William M. Jennings Trophy	Fewest goals given up in the regular season (1981–present)	Bob Froese	1985–86	
William M. Jennings Trophy	Fewest goals given up in the regular season (1981–present)	Darren Jensen	1985–86	
William M. Jennings Trophy	Fewest goals given up in the regular season (1981–present)	Roman Cechmanek	2002–03 (Note: Shared with Martin Brodeur of the New Jersey Devils.)	
William M. Jennings Trophy	Fewest goals given up in the regular season (1981–present)	Robert Esche	2002–03	

== All-Stars ==
=== NHL first and second team All-Stars ===
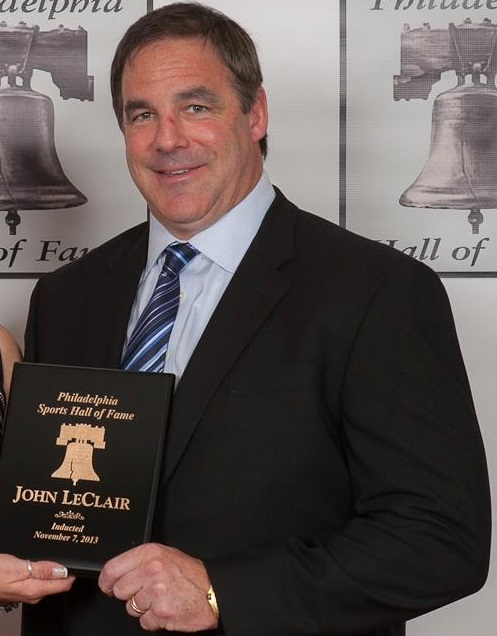
John LeClair, seen here at his 2013 induction into the Philadelphia Sports Hall of Fame, leads all Flyers players with five selections to the NHL All-Star team.

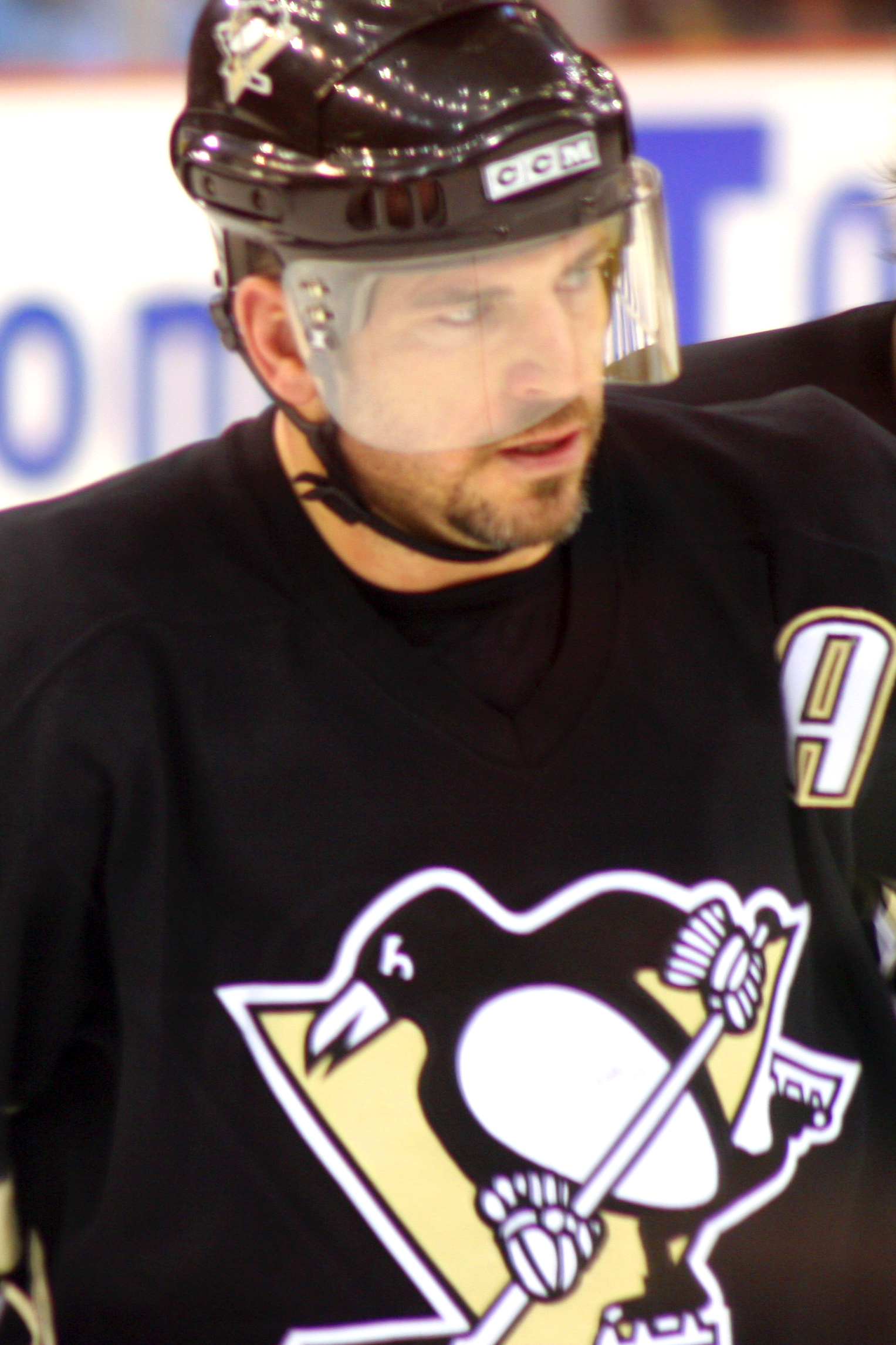
Mark Recchi, seen here playing for the Pittsburgh Penguins in 2006, split the 1991–92 season with the Penguins and the Flyers and made the NHL second All-Star team.

The NHL first and second team All-Stars are the top players at each position as voted on by the Professional Hockey Writers' Association.

Philadelphia Flyers selected to the NHL First and Second Team All-Stars
Player	Position	Selections	Season	Team
Barry Ashbee	Defense	1	1973–74	2nd
Bill Barber	Left Wing	3	1975–76	1st
Bill Barber	Left Wing	3	1978–79	2nd
Bill Barber	Left Wing	3	1980–81	2nd
Roman Cechmanek	Goaltender	1	2000–01	2nd
Bobby Clarke	Center	4	1972–73	2nd
Bobby Clarke	Center	4	1973–74	2nd
Bobby Clarke	Center	4	1974–75	1st
Bobby Clarke	Center	4	1975–76	1st
Eric Desjardins	Defense	2	1998–99	2nd
Eric Desjardins	Defense	2	1999–2000	2nd
Bob Froese	Goaltender	1	1985–86	2nd
Claude Giroux	Left Wing	1	2017–18	2nd
Ron Hextall	Goaltender	1	1986–87	1st
Mark Howe	Defense	3	1982–83	1st
Mark Howe	Defense	3	1985–86	1st
Mark Howe	Defense	3	1986–87	1st
Tim Kerr	Right Wing	1	1986–87	2nd
Reggie Leach	Right Wing	1	1975–76	2nd
John LeClair	Left Wing	5	1994–95	1st
John LeClair	Left Wing	5	1995–96	2nd
John LeClair	Left Wing	5	1996–97	2nd
John LeClair	Left Wing	5	1997–98	1st
John LeClair	Left Wing	5	1998–99	2nd
Pelle Lindbergh	Goaltender	1	1984–85	1st
Eric Lindros	Center	2	1994–95	1st
Eric Lindros	Center	2	1995–96	2nd
Bernie Parent	Goaltender	2	1973–74	1st
Bernie Parent	Goaltender	2	1974–75	1st
Mark Recchi	Right Wing	1	1991–92	2nd
Jakub Voracek	Right Wing	1	2014–15	1st

=== NHL All-Rookie Team ===
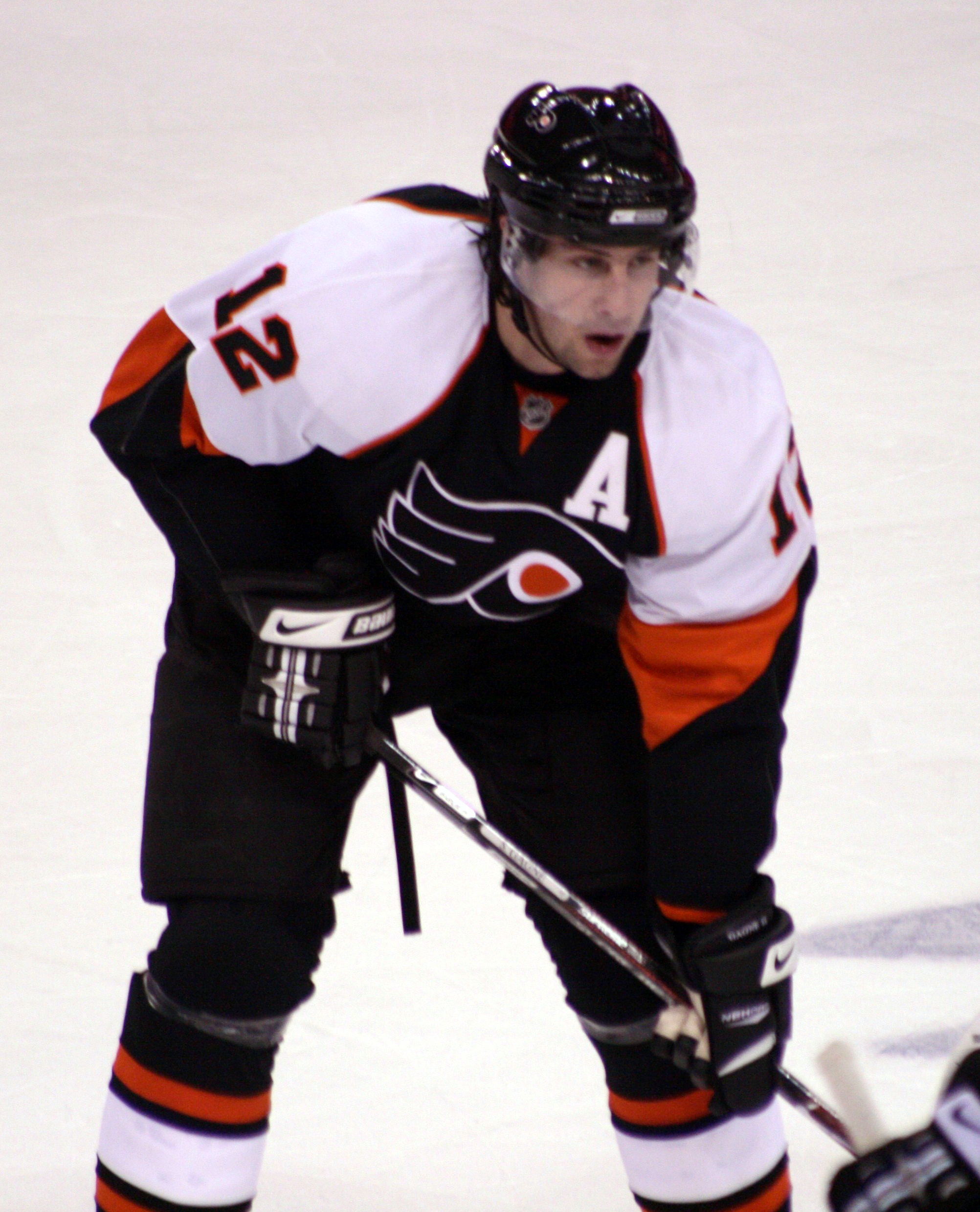
Simon Gagne was named to the NHL All-Rookie Team in 1999–2000.

The NHL All-Rookie Team consists of the top rookies at each position as voted on by the Professional Hockey Writers' Association.

Philadelphia Flyers selected to the NHL All-Rookie Team
Player	Position	Season
Brian Boucher	Goaltender	1999–2000
Thomas Eriksson	Defense	1983–84
Simon Gagne	Forward	1999–2000
Shayne Gostisbehere	Defense	2015–16
Ron Hextall	Goaltender	1986–87
Pelle Lindbergh	Goaltender	1982–83
Eric Lindros	Forward	1992–93
Matvei Michkov	Forward	2024–25
Janne Niinimaa	Defense	1996–97
Joni Pitkanen	Defense	2003–04
Mikael Renberg	Forward	1993–94
Chris Therien	Defense	1994–95

=== All-Star Game selections ===
The National Hockey League All-Star Game is a mid-season exhibition game held annually between many of the top players of each season. Forty-five All-Star Games have been held since the Flyers entered the league in 1967, with at least one player chosen to represent the Flyers in each year. The All-Star game has not been held in various years: 1979 and 1987 due to the 1979 Challenge Cup and Rendez-vous '87 series between the NHL and the Soviet national team, respectively, 1995, 2005, and 2013 as a result of labor stoppages, 2006, 2010, 2014 and 2026 because of the Winter Olympic Games, 2021 as a result of the COVID-19 pandemic, and 2025 when it was replaced by the 2025 4 Nations Face-Off. Philadelphia has hosted two All-Star Games. The 29th and 43rd took place at the Spectrum.

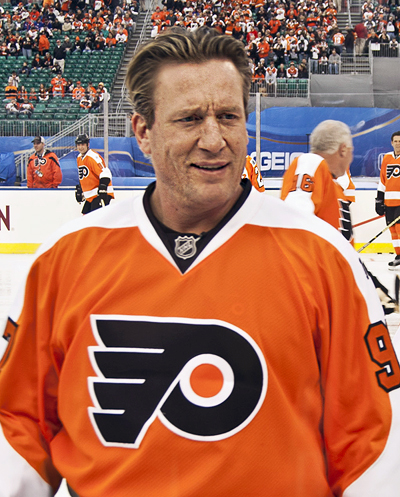
Jeremy Roenick played in the All-Star Game during all three of his seasons with the Flyers.

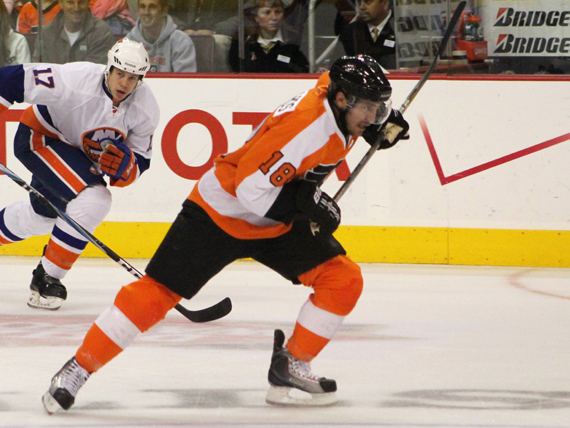
Mike Richards played in his first NHL All-Star Game in 2008.

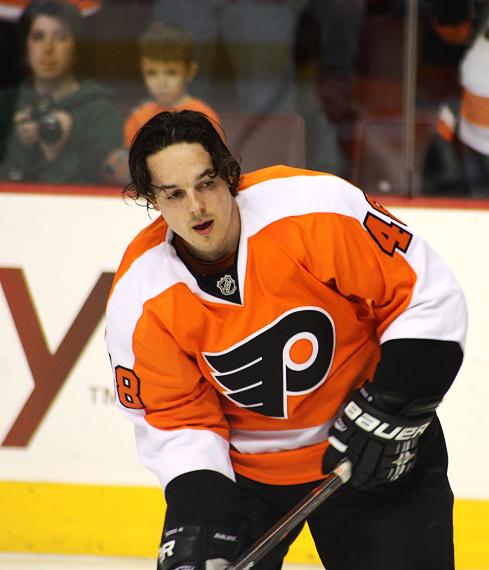
Danny Briere was one of three Flyers representatives at the 2011 All-Star Game.

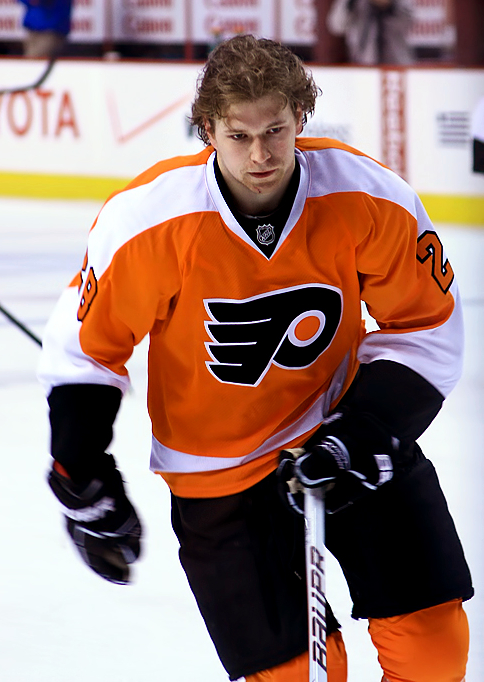
Claude Giroux has played in seven NHL All-Star Games.

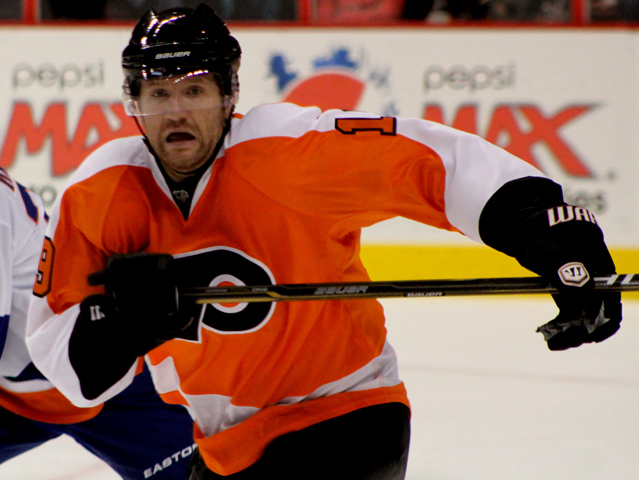
Scott Hartnell played in his first NHL All-Star Game in 2012.

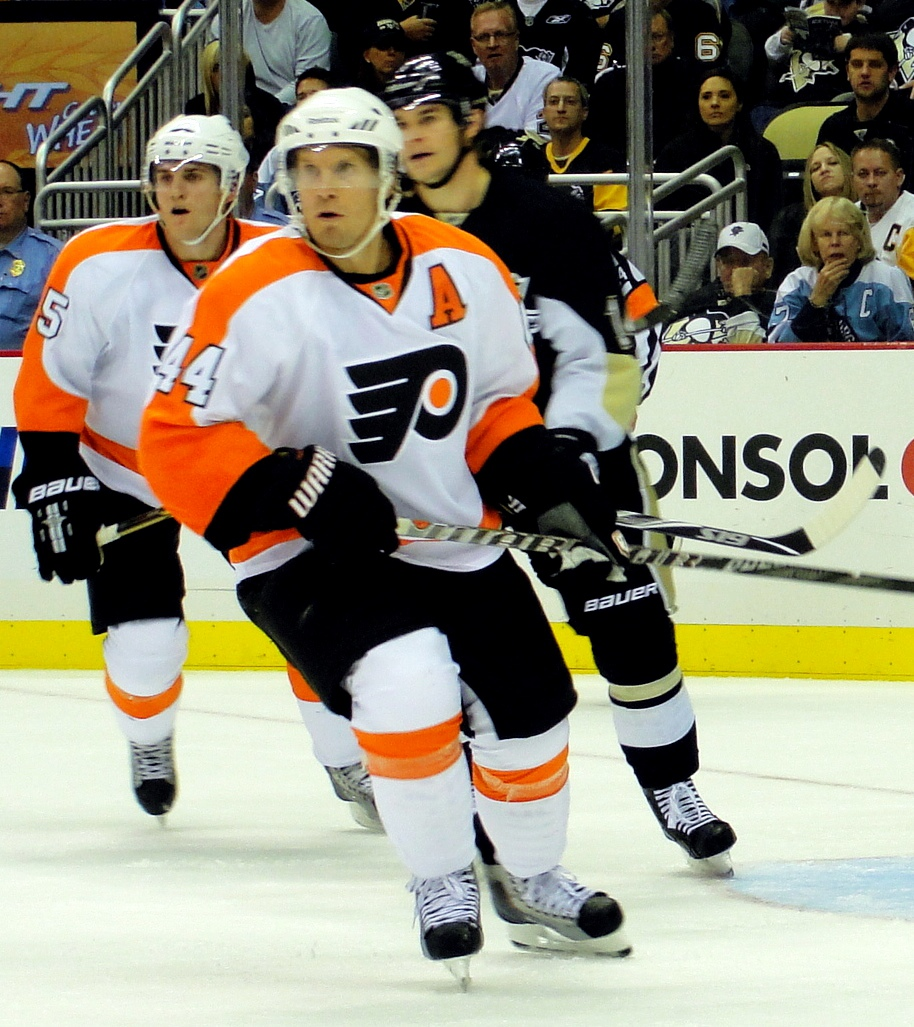
Kimmo Timonen played in two All-Star Games during his stint with the Flyers.

- † Selected by fan vote
- ‡ Selected by Commissioner
- ↑ All-Star Game Most Valuable Player

Philadelphia Flyers players and coaches selected to the All-Star Game
Game	Year	Name	Position
21st	1968	Leon Rochefort	Right Wing
22nd	1969	Bernie Parent	Goaltender
22nd	1969	Ed Van Impe	Defense
23rd	1970	Bobby Clarke	Center
23rd	1970	Bernie Parent	Goaltender
24th	1971	Bobby Clarke	Center
25th	1972	Bobby Clarke	Center
25th	1972	Simon Nolet	Right Wing
26th	1973	Bobby Clarke	Center
26th	1973	Gary Dornhoefer	Right Wing
27th	1974	Bobby Clarke	Center
27th	1974	Bernie Parent	Goaltender
27th	1974	Ed Van Impe	Defense
27th	1974	Joe Watson	Defense
28th	1975	Bill Barber	Left Wing
28th	1975	Bobby Clarke	Center
28th	1975	Bernie Parent	Goaltender
28th	1975	Fred Shero	Coach
28th	1975	Ed Van Impe	Defense
28th	1975	Jimmy Watson	Defense
29th	1976	Bill Barber	Left Wing
29th	1976	Bobby Clarke (Did not play)	Center
29th	1976	Andre Dupont	Defense
29th	1976	Reggie Leach	Right Wing
29th	1976	Rick MacLeish (Note: MacLeish subbed for Clarke.)	Center
29th	1976	Fred Shero	Coach
29th	1976	Wayne Stephenson	Goaltender
29th	1976	Jimmy Watson	Defense
30th	1977	Tom Bladon	Defense
30th	1977	Bobby Clarke	Center
30th	1977	Gary Dornhoefer	Right Wing
30th	1977	Rick MacLeish	Center
30th	1977	Bernie Parent	Goaltender
30th	1977	Fred Shero	Coach
30th	1977	Jimmy Watson	Defense
30th	1977	Joe Watson	Defense
31st	1978	Bill Barber	Left Wing
31st	1978	Tom Bladon	Defense
31st	1978	Bobby Clarke	Center
31st	1978	Bob Dailey	Defense
31st	1978	Fred Shero	Coach
31st	1978	Wayne Stephenson	Goaltender
31st	1978	Jimmy Watson	Defense
32nd	1980	Bill Barber	Left Wing
32nd	1980	Norm Barnes	Defense
32nd	1980	Reggie Leach↑	Right Wing
32nd	1980	Rick MacLeish	Center
32nd	1980	Pete Peeters	Goaltender
32nd	1980	Brian Propp	Left Wing
32nd	1980	Jimmy Watson	Defense
33rd	1981	Bill Barber	Left Wing
33rd	1981	Bob Dailey	Defense
33rd	1981	Paul Holmgren	Right Wing
33rd	1981	Pete Peeters	Goaltender
33rd	1981	Pat Quinn	Coach
33rd	1981	Behn Wilson	Defense
34th	1982	Bill Barber	Left Wing
34th	1982	Brian Propp	Left Wing
35th	1983	Mark Howe	Defense
35th	1983	Pelle Lindbergh	Goaltender
35th	1983	Darryl Sittler	Center
36th	1984	Tim Kerr	Right Wing
36th	1984	Brian Propp	Left Wing
37th	1985	Mark Howe (Did not play)	Defense
37th	1985	Tim Kerr	Right Wing
37th	1985	Pelle Lindbergh	Goaltender
38th	1986	Bob Froese	Goaltender
38th	1986	Mark Howe	Defense
38th	1986	Mike Keenan	Coach
38th	1986	Tim Kerr†	Right Wing
38th	1986	Pelle Lindbergh† (Note: Lindbergh was posthumously selected.)	Goaltender
38th	1986	E. J. McGuire	Assistant coach
38th	1986	Dave Poulin	Center
38th	1986	Brian Propp	Left Wing
39th	1988	Ron Hextall†	Goaltender
39th	1988	Mark Howe	Defense
39th	1988	Mike Keenan	Coach
39th	1988	E. J. McGuire	Assistant coach
39th	1988	Dave Poulin	Center
39th	1988	Kjell Samuelsson	Defense
40th	1989	Rick Tocchet	Right Wing
41st	1990	Brian Propp†	Left Wing
41st	1990	Rick Tocchet	Right Wing
42nd	1991	Rick Tocchet†	Right Wing
43rd	1992	Rod Brind'Amour	Center
44th	1993	Mark Recchi	Right Wing
45th	1994	Garry Galley	Defense
45th	1994	Eric Lindros†	Center
45th	1994	Mark Recchi	Right Wing
46th	1996	Eric Desjardins	Defense
46th	1996	John LeClair	Left Wing
46th	1996	Eric Lindros	Center
46th	1996	Craig MacTavish‡	Center
47th	1997	Paul Coffey	Defense
47th	1997	Dale Hawerchuk‡	Center
47th	1997	John LeClair	Left Wing
47th	1997	Eric Lindros	Center
48th	1998	John LeClair†	Left Wing
48th	1998	Eric Lindros†	Center
49th	1999	John LeClair	Left Wing
49th	1999	Eric Lindros	Center
50th	2000	Eric Desjardins	Defense
50th	2000	John LeClair	Left Wing
50th	2000	Eric Lindros	Center
50th	2000	Roger Neilson	Assistant coach
50th	2000	Mark Recchi	Right Wing
51st	2001	Roman Cechmanek	Goaltender
51st	2001	Simon Gagne (Note: Gagne subbed for Vincent Damphousse of the San Jose Sharks.)	Left Wing
52nd	2002	Jeremy Roenick	Center
53rd	2003	Ken Hitchcock	Assistant coach
53rd	2003	Jeremy Roenick	Center
54th	2004	Ken Hitchcock	Assistant coach
54th	2004	Keith Primeau	Center
54th	2004	Jeremy Roenick	Center
55th	2007	Simon Gagne	Left Wing
56th	2008	Mike Richards	Center
56th	2008	Kimmo Timonen	Defense
57th	2009	Jeff Carter	Center
58th	2011	Danny Briere (Note: Briere subbed for Jarome Iginla of the Calgary Flames.)	Center
58th	2011	Claude Giroux	Right Wing
58th	2011	Peter Laviolette	Co-coach
59th	2012	Claude Giroux	Center
59th	2012	Scott Hartnell (Note: Hartnell subbed for Jonathan Toews of the Chicago Blackhawks.)	Left Wing
59th	2012	Kimmo Timonen	Defense
60th	2015	Claude Giroux	Center
60th	2015	Jakub Voracek	Right Wing
61st	2016	Claude Giroux	Center
62nd	2017	Wayne Simmonds↑	Right Wing
63rd	2018	Claude Giroux	Left Wing
64th	2019	Claude Giroux	Left Wing
65th	2020	Travis Konecny	Right Wing
66th	2022	Claude Giroux↑	Left Wing
67th	2023	Kevin Hayes	Right Wing
68th	2024	Travis Konecny	Right Wing

=== All-Star Game replacement events ===
- † Selected by fan vote

Philadelphia Flyers players and coaches selected to All-Star Game replacement events
Event	Year	Name	Position
Challenge Cup	1979	Bill Barber	Left Wing
Challenge Cup	1979	Bobby Clarke	Center
Rendez-vous '87	1987	Ron Hextall (Did not play)	Goaltender
Rendez-vous '87	1987	Mark Howe† (Did not play)	Defense
Rendez-vous '87	1987	Tim Kerr (Did not play)	Right Wing
Rendez-vous '87	1987	Dave Poulin	Center
4 Nations Face-Off	2025	Travis Konecny (Canada)	Right Wing
4 Nations Face-Off	2025	Rasmus Ristolainen (Finland)	Defense
4 Nations Face-Off	2025	Travis Sanheim (Canada)	Defense
4 Nations Face-Off	2025	John Tortorella (United States)	Coach

== Career achievements ==
=== Hockey Hall of Fame ===
The following is a list of Philadelphia Flyers who have been enshrined in the Hockey Hall of Fame. Of the fourteen Flyers inducted as Players, six spent significant time with the team – Bobby Clarke and Bill Barber played their entire NHL careers with the Flyers while Bernie Parent, Mark Howe, Eric Lindros, and Mark Recchi each played at least eight seasons with the club. Of the seven who were inducted as Builders who spent some time in the Flyers organization, Ed Snider, Keith Allen, and Fred Shero were inducted largely due to their time with the Flyers.

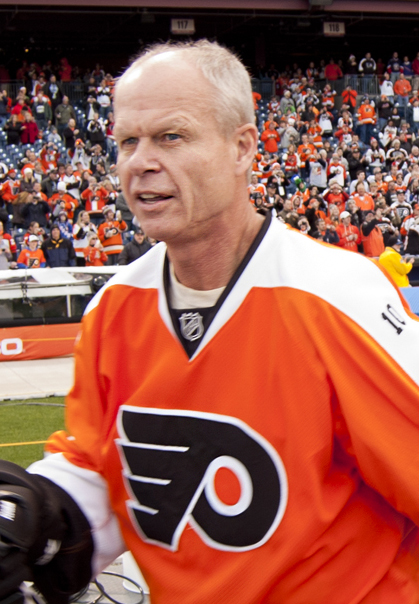
Mark Howe, inducted in 2011, played ten seasons of his Hall of Fame career with the Flyers.

Philadelphia Flyers inducted into the Hockey Hall of Fame
Individual	Category	Year inducted	Years with Flyers in category	References
Keith Allen	Builder	1992	1967–2014	
Bill Barber	Player	1990	1972–1984	
Bobby Clarke	Player	1987	1969–1984	
Paul Coffey	Player	2004	1996–1998	
Peter Forsberg	Player	2014	2005–2007	
Dale Hawerchuk	Player	2001	1996–1997	
Ken Hitchcock	Builder	2023	1990–1993, 2002–2006	
Mark Howe	Player	2011	1982–1992	
Eric Lindros	Player	2016	1992–2000	
Roger Neilson	Builder	2002	1998–2000	
Adam Oates	Player	2012	2002	
Bernie Parent	Player	1984	1967–1971, 1973–1979	
Bud Poile	Builder	1990	1967–1969	
Chris Pronger	Player	2015	2009–2011	
Pat Quinn	Builder	2016	1977–1982	
Mark Recchi	Player	2017	1992–1995, 1999–2004	
Jeremy Roenick	Player	2024	2001–2004	
Fred Shero	Builder	2013	1971–1978	
Darryl Sittler	Player	1989	1982–1984	
Ed Snider	Builder	1988	1967–2016	
Allan Stanley	Player	1981	1968–1969	

=== Foster Hewitt Memorial Award ===
Three members of the Flyers organization have been honored with the Foster Hewitt Memorial Award. The award is presented by the Hockey Hall of Fame to members of the radio and television industry who make outstanding contributions to their profession and the game of ice hockey during their broadcasting career.

Members of the Philadelphia Flyers honored with the Foster Hewitt Memorial Award
Individual	Year honored	Years with Flyers as broadcaster	References
Bill Clement	2022	1989–1992, 2007–2020	
Mike Emrick	2008	1983–1993	
Gene Hart	1997	1967–1995	

=== Lester Patrick Trophy ===
Eight members of the Flyers organization have been honored with the Lester Patrick Trophy. The trophy has been presented by the National Hockey League and USA Hockey since 1966 to honor a recipient's contribution to ice hockey in the United States. This list includes all personnel who have ever been employed by the Philadelphia Flyers in any capacity and have also received the Lester Patrick Trophy.

Members of the Philadelphia Flyers honored with the Lester Patrick Trophy
Individual	Year honored	Years with Flyers	References
Keith Allen	1988	1967–2014	
Bobby Clarke	1980	1969–1990, 1992–1993, 1994–present	
Mike Emrick	2004	1983–1993	
Paul Holmgren	2014	1976–1984, 1985–1992, 1996–present	
Mark Howe	2016	1982–1992	
Bud Poile	1989	1967–1969	
Fred Shero	1980	1971–1978	
Ed Snider	1980	1967–2016	

=== Retired numbers ===
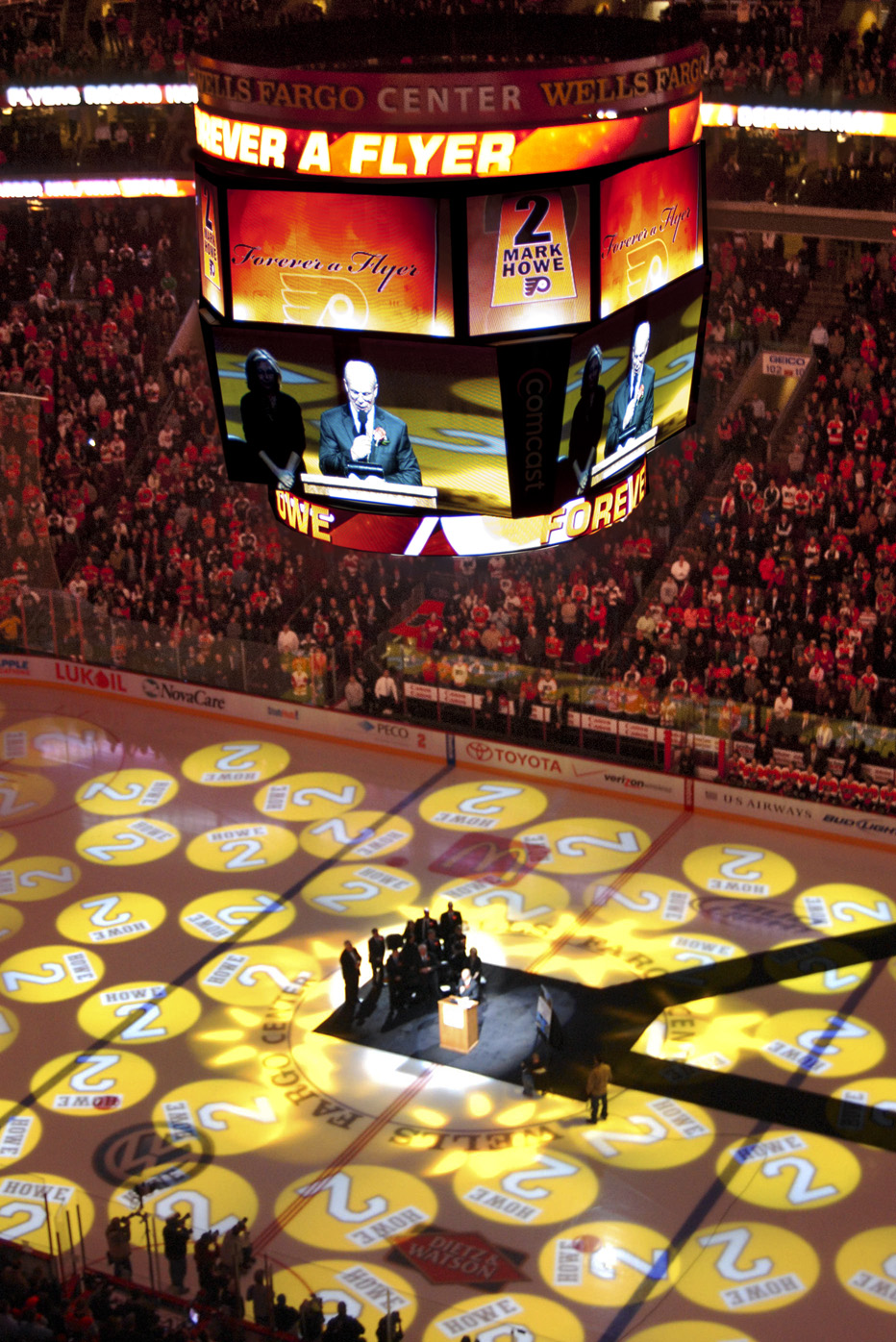
Mark Howe speaking at the retirement of his number (2) on March 6, 2012.

The Flyers have retired six of their jersey numbers and taken another number out of circulation. Barry Ashbee's number 4 was retired a few months after his death from leukemia. Bernie Parent's number 1 — Parent wore number 30 during his first stint with the Flyers — and Bobby Clarke's number 16 were retired less than a year after retiring while Bill Barber's number 7, Mark Howe's number 2, and Eric Lindros' number 88 were retired shortly after their inductions into the Hockey Hall of Fame. The number 31, last worn by goaltender Pelle Lindbergh, was removed from circulation after Lindbergh's death on November 11, 1985, but it is not officially retired. Also out of circulation is the number 99 which was retired league-wide for Wayne Gretzky on February 6, 2000. Gretzky did not play for the Flyers during his 20-year NHL career and no Flyers player had ever worn the number 99 prior to its retirement.

Philadelphia Flyers retired numbers
Number	Player	Position	Years with Flyers as a player	Date of retirement ceremony	References
1	Bernie Parent	Goaltender	1967–1971, 1973–1979	October 11, 1979	
2	Mark Howe	Defense	1982–1992	March 6, 2012	
4	Barry Ashbee	Defense	1970–1974	October 13, 1977	
7	Bill Barber	Left Wing	1972–1984	October 11, 1990	
16	Bobby Clarke	Center	1969–1984	November 15, 1984	
88	Eric Lindros	Center	1992–2000	January 18, 2018	

=== Flyers Hall of Fame ===
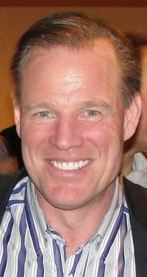
Brian Propp was elected to the Flyers Hall of Fame in 1999.

Established in 1988, the Flyers Hall of Fame was designed to "permanently honor those individuals who have contributed to the franchise's success." The selection process features a nomination committee and a voting committee, both composed of Flyers Hall of Famers, alumni, front office members, broadcasters, and members of the Philadelphia chapter of the Professional Hockey Writers Association.

Members of the Philadelphia Flyers inducted into the Flyers Hall of Fame
Individual	Primary roles	Years with Flyers in roles	Date of induction ceremony	References
Keith Allen	Head coach, executive	1967–2014	March 16, 1989	
Barry Ashbee	Player	1970–1974	March 21, 1991	
Bill Barber	Player, head coach	1972–1984, 2000–2002	March 16, 1989	
Rod Brind'Amour	Player	1991–2000	November 23, 2015	
Bobby Clarke	Player, executive	1969–1990, 1992–1993, 1994–present	March 22, 1988	
Eric Desjardins	Player	1995–2006	February 19, 2015	
Gary Dornhoefer	Player	1967–1978	March 21, 1991	
Simon Gagne	Player	1999–2010, 2013	February 27, 2027	
Gene Hart	Broadcaster	1967–1995	February 13, 1992	
Ron Hextall	Player, executive	1986–1992, 1994–1999, 2014–2018	February 6, 2008	
Paul Holmgren	Player, head coach, executive	1976–1991, 1995–present	November 16, 2021	
Mark Howe	Player	1982–1992	March 15, 2001	
Bob Kelly	Player	1970–1980	February 27, 2027	
Tim Kerr	Player	1980–1991	March 8, 1994	
Reggie Leach	Player	1974–1982	February 13, 1992	
John LeClair	Player	1995–2004	November 20, 2014	
Eric Lindros	Player	1992–2000	November 20, 2014	
Rick MacLeish	Player	1970–1980, 1983–1984	March 22, 1990	
Bernie Parent	Player	1967–1971, 1973–1979	March 22, 1988	
Dave Poulin	Player	1983–1990	March 3, 2004	
Brian Propp	Player	1979–1990	March 4, 1999	
Mark Recchi	Player	1992–1995, 1999–2004	January 27, 2024	
Dave Schultz	Player	1972–1976	November 16, 2009	
Joe Scott	Executive	1967–2002	April 8, 1993	
Fred Shero	Head coach	1971–1978	March 22, 1990	
Ed Snider	Owner	1967–2016	March 16, 1989	
Rick Tocchet	Player, head coach	1984–1992, 2000–2002, 2025–present	November 16, 2021	
Ed Van Impe	Player	1967–1976	April 8, 1993	
Jimmy Watson	Player	1973–1982	February 29, 2016	
Joe Watson	Player	1967–1978	February 22, 1996	

== Team awards ==
=== Barry Ashbee Trophy ===
First awarded following the 1974–75 season, the Barry Ashbee Trophy is given out to the team's "outstanding defenseman" as determined by a panel vote consisting of local sportscasters and sportswriters. The trophy is named in honor of Barry Ashbee, an NHL second team All-Star and the team's best defenseman during the 1973–74 season who suffered a career-ending eye injury during game four of the 1974 Stanley Cup Semifinals. Eric Desjardins won the trophy seven times during his Flyers career including six in a row his first six seasons with the Flyers. Kimmo Timonen with five wins and Mark Howe, Ivan Provorov, and Travis Sanheim with four wins are the only other Flyers to win the trophy at least four times.

- 1974–75 – Joe Watson
- 1975–76 – Jimmy Watson
- 1976–77 – Andre Dupont
- 1977–78 – Jimmy Watson
- 1978–79 – Bob Dailey
- 1979–80 – Norm Barnes
- 1980–81 – Bob Dailey
- 1981–82 – Frank Bathe
- 1982–83 – Mark Howe
- 1983–84 – Miroslav Dvorak
- 1984–85 – Brad McCrimmon
- 1985–86 – Mark Howe
- 1986–87 – Mark Howe
- 1987–88 – Mark Howe
- 1988–89 – Kjell Samuelsson
- 1989–90 – Gord Murphy
- 1990–91 – Kjell Samuelsson
- 1991–92 – Steve Duchesne
- 1992–93 – Garry Galley
- 1993–94 – Garry Galley
- 1994–95 – Eric Desjardins
- 1995–96 – Eric Desjardins
- 1996–97 – Eric Desjardins
- 1997–98 – Eric Desjardins
- 1998–99 – Eric Desjardins
- 1999–00 – Eric Desjardins
- 2000–01 – Dan McGillis
- 2001–02 – Kim Johnsson
- 2002–03 – Eric Desjardins
- 2003–04 – Kim Johnsson
- 2005–06 – Joni Pitkanen
- 2006–07 – Derian Hatcher
- 2007–08 – Kimmo Timonen
- 2008–09 – Kimmo Timonen
- 2009–10 – Chris Pronger
- 2010–11 – Andrej Meszaros
- 2011–12 – Kimmo Timonen
- 2012–13 – Kimmo Timonen
- 2013–14 – Kimmo Timonen
- 2014–15 – Mark Streit
- 2015–16 – Shayne Gostisbehere
- 2016–17 – Ivan Provorov
- 2017–18 – Shayne Gostisbehere
- 2018–19 – Radko Gudas
- 2019–20 – Ivan Provorov
- 2020–21 – Ivan Provorov
- 2021–22 – Travis Sanheim
- 2022–23 – Ivan Provorov
- 2023–24 – Travis Sanheim
- 2024–25 – Travis Sanheim
- 2025–26 – Travis Sanheim

=== Bobby Clarke Trophy ===
The Flyers unveiled the Bobby Clarke Trophy on November 15, 1984, to honor the retired Bobby Clarke during Bobby Clarke Night at the Spectrum. Clarke was the captain of the Flyers for several seasons, including during the team's two Stanley Cup championship seasons, and was and still is the holder of several Philadelphia Flyers records. Since then it has been given to the "team's most valuable player" as determined by a panel vote consisting of local sportscasters and sportswriters. Claude Giroux won the trophy five times during his Flyers career while Eric Lindros won the trophy four times.

- 1984–85 – Pelle Lindbergh
- 1985–86 – Mark Howe
- 1986–87 – Ron Hextall
- 1987–88 – Ron Hextall
- 1988–89 – Ron Hextall
- 1989–90 – Rick Tocchet
- 1990–91 – Pelle Eklund
- 1991–92 – Rod Brind'Amour
- 1992–93 – Mark Recchi
- 1993–94 – Eric Lindros
- 1994–95 – Eric Lindros
- 1995–96 – Eric Lindros
- 1996–97 – John LeClair
- 1997–98 – John LeClair
- 1998–99 – Eric Lindros
- 1999–00 – Mark Recchi
- 2000–01 – Roman Cechmanek
- 2001–02 – Jeremy Roenick
- 2002–03 – Roman Cechmanek
- 2003–04 – Mark Recchi
- 2005–06 – Simon Gagne
- 2006–07 – Simon Gagne
- 2007–08 – Mike Richards
- 2008–09 – Mike Richards
- 2009–10 – Chris Pronger
- 2010–11 – Claude Giroux
- 2011–12 – Claude Giroux
- 2012–13 – Jakub Voracek
- 2013–14 – Claude Giroux
- 2014–15 – Jakub Voracek
- 2015–16 – Claude Giroux
- 2016–17 – Wayne Simmonds
- 2017–18 – Claude Giroux
- 2018–19 – Sean Couturier
- 2019–20 – Sean Couturier
- 2020–21 – Sean Couturier
- 2021–22 – Cam Atkinson
- 2022–23 – Carter Hart
- 2023–24 – Travis Konecny
- 2024–25 – Travis Konecny
- 2025–26 – Daniel Vladar

=== Flyers Alumni Community Leadership Award ===
The Flyers Alumni Community Leadership Award is given to the Flyers player "who best demonstrates outstanding leadership, both on and off the ice, as well as a significant contribution to the community." The recipient of this award is also the Flyers' nominee for the NHL's King Clancy Memorial Trophy. It was first awarded for the 2023–24 season.

- 2023–24 – Scott Laughton
- 2024–25 – Garnet Hathaway
- 2025–26 – Garnet Hathaway

=== Gene Hart Memorial Award ===
First given out for the 2006–07 season to honor the memory of long-time announcer Gene Hart, the Gene Hart Memorial Award is given to the Flyer "who demonstrated the most "Heart" during the season" as voted on by members of the Philadelphia Flyers Fan Club at their monthly meetings. Sean Couturier with three wins is the only player to win the award more than once.

- 2006–07 – Sami Kapanen
- 2007–08 – Mike Richards
- 2008–09 – Scott Hartnell
- 2009–10 – Ian Laperriere
- 2010–11 – Claude Giroux
- 2011–12 – Wayne Simmonds
- 2012–13 – Zac Rinaldo
- 2013–14 – Steve Mason
- 2014–15 – Jakub Voracek
- 2015–16 – Shayne Gostisbehere
- 2016–17 – Pierre-Edouard Bellemare
- 2017–18 – Sean Couturier
- 2018–19 – Sean Couturier
- 2019–20 – Kevin Hayes
- 2020–21 – Sean Couturier
- 2021–22 – Zack MacEwen
- 2022–23 – Carter Hart
- 2023–24 – Samuel Ersson
- 2024–25 – Noah Cates
- 2025–26 – Travis Sanheim

=== Pelle Lindbergh Memorial Trophy ===
The Pelle Lindbergh Memorial Trophy is awarded to the "Flyer who has most improved from the previous season, as voted by his teammates." Named to honor the memory of Pelle Lindbergh, a Vezina Trophy–winning goaltender with the Flyers who died at the age of 26 on November 11, 1985, following a car crash the day before, the trophy has been given to 34 different players since the 1993–94 season.

- 1993–94 – Mikael Renberg
- 1994–95 – John LeClair
- 1995–96 – Shjon Podein
- 1996–97 – Trent Klatt
- 1997–98 – Colin Forbes
- 1998–99 – Daymond Langkow
- 1999–00 – Luke Richardson
- 2000–01 – Simon Gagne and Dan McGillis
- 2001–02 – Justin Williams
- 2002–03 – Donald Brashear
- 2003–04 – Robert Esche
- 2005–06 – Joni Pitkanen
- 2006–07 – Ben Eager
- 2007–08 – Braydon Coburn and Riley Cote
- 2008–09 – Darroll Powe
- 2009–10 – Matt Carle
- 2010–11 – Andreas Nodl
- 2011–12 – Scott Hartnell
- 2012–13 – Jakub Voracek
- 2013–14 – Michael Raffl
- 2014–15 – Chris VandeVelde
- 2015–16 – Brayden Schenn
- 2016–17 – Radko Gudas
- 2017–18 – Sean Couturier
- 2018–19 – Travis Sanheim
- 2019–20 – Scott Laughton
- 2020–21 – Joel Farabee
- 2021–22 – Travis Sanheim
- 2022–23 – Owen Tippett
- 2023–24 – Cam York
- 2024–25 – Bobby Brink
- 2025–26 – Jamie Drysdale

=== Toyota Cup ===
First given out following the 2000–01 season, the Toyota Cup is an award given to the player who earns the most points from Star of the game selections throughout the regular season, "five points for being the First Star, three for Second Star, and one for Third Star." The Tri-State Toyota Dealers sponsor the award and make a donation of $5,000 in the winning player's name to the player's favorite charity. Claude Giroux with seven wins, Simon Gagne and Carter Hart each with three wins, and Travis Konecny with two wins are the only multiple-time winners of the trophy.

- 2000–01 – Roman Cechmanek
- 2001–02 – Simon Gagne
- 2002–03 – Keith Primeau
- 2003–04 – Mark Recchi
- 2005–06 – Simon Gagne
- 2006–07 – Simon Gagne
- 2007–08 – Martin Biron
- 2008–09 – Jeff Carter
- 2009–10 – Mike Richards
- 2010–11 – Danny Briere
- 2011–12 – Claude Giroux
- 2012–13 – Claude Giroux
- 2013–14 – Claude Giroux
- 2014–15 – Claude Giroux
- 2015–16 – Claude Giroux
- 2016–17 – Wayne Simmonds
- 2017–18 – Claude Giroux
- 2018–19 – Carter Hart
- 2019–20 – Travis Konecny
- 2020–21 – Claude Giroux
- 2021–22 – Carter Hart
- 2022–23 – Carter Hart
- 2023–24 – Travis Konecny
- 2024–25 – Matvei Michkov
- 2025–26 – Trevor Zegras

=== Yanick Dupre Memorial Class Guy Award ===
The Yanick Dupre Memorial Class Guy Award was first awarded following the 1976–77 season as the Class Guy Award "to the player who best exemplifies a strong rapport with the media." The award was renamed and re-defined in 1999 to honor the memory of Yanick Dupre. Dupre, who played 35 games over parts of three seasons with the Flyers, died on August 16, 1997, at the age of 24 after a 16-month battle with leukemia. It is now given to the "Flyer who best illustrates character, dignity and respect for the sport both on and off the ice" as decided by the Philadelphia chapter of the Professional Hockey Writers' Association. As is tradition, no Flyers player has won the award more than once.

- 1976–77 – Gary Dornhoefer
- 1977–78 – Joe Watson
- 1978–79 – Bernie Parent
- 1979–80 – Andre Dupont
- 1980–81 – Bill Barber
- 1981–82 – Bobby Clarke
- 1982–83 – Mark Howe
- 1983–84 – Dave Poulin
- 1984–85 – Brad Marsh
- 1985–86 – Murray Craven
- 1986–87 – Glenn Resch
- 1987–88 – Rick Tocchet
- 1988–89 – Ron Sutter
- 1989–90 – Craig Berube
- 1990–91 – Gord Murphy
- 1991–92 – Kevin Dineen
- 1992–93 – Mark Recchi
- 1993–94 – Garry Galley
- 1994–95 – Mikael Renberg
- 1995–96 – Ron Hextall
- 1996–97 – Shjon Podein
- 1997–98 – Trent Klatt
- 1998–99 – Eric Desjardins
- 1999–00 – Keith Jones
- 2000–01 – Keith Primeau
- 2001–02 – Jeremy Roenick
- 2002–03 – Robert Esche
- 2003–04 – Sami Kapanen
- 2005–06 – Peter Forsberg
- 2006–07 – Mike Knuble
- 2007–08 – Martin Biron
- 2008–09 – Danny Briere
- 2009–10 – Ian Laperriere
- 2010–11 – Brian Boucher
- 2011–12 – Jaromir Jagr
- 2012–13 – Scott Hartnell
- 2013–14 – Jakub Voracek
- 2014–15 – Mark Streit
- 2015–16 – Wayne Simmonds
- 2016–17 – Steve Mason
- 2017–18 – Sean Couturier
- 2018–19 – Andrew MacDonald
- 2019–20 – Scott Laughton
- 2020–21 – James van Riemsdyk
- 2021–22 – Cam Atkinson
- 2022–23 – Justin Braun
- 2023–24 – Nick Seeler
- 2024–25 – Travis Sanheim
- 2025–26 – Daniel Vladar

== Other awards and honors ==
This section is for awards and honors not associated with the Philadelphia Flyers, National Hockey League, or Hockey Hall of Fame.

Philadelphia Flyers who have received non-NHL awards
Award	Description	Winner	Season	References
Best NHL Player ESPY Award	Best NHL player of the last calendar year	Eric Lindros	1996	
Golden Hockey Stick	Best Czech ice hockey player	Jakub Voracek	2014–15	
Lionel Conacher Award	Canada's male athlete of the year	Bobby Clarke	1975	
Lou Marsh Trophy	Canada's top athlete	Bobby Clarke	1975	
Viking Award	Most valuable Swedish player in NHL	Pelle Lindbergh	1982–83	
Viking Award	Most valuable Swedish player in NHL	Mikael Renberg	1994–95	

=== John Wanamaker Athletic Award ===
The John Wanamaker Athletic Award is an award given to the "Athlete, team or organization which has done the most to reflect credit upon Philadelphia and to the team or sport in which they excel" by the Philadelphia Sports Congress. A Flyers player, coach, or team has won the award five times. The Flyers' minor league affiliate, the Philadelphia Phantoms, won the award in 1999. In addition to the athletic award, Ed Snider won the lifetime achievement award in 2012 and the Flyers' Wives Fight for Lives won the community service award in 1996.

- 1974 – Bobby Clarke and the 1973–74 Philadelphia Flyers
- 1975 – Bernie Parent
- 1976 – Fred Shero
- 1980 – 1979–80 Philadelphia Flyers (Note: Award shared with the 1979–80 Philadelphia 76ers.)
- 2012 – Claude Giroux

=== Philadelphia Sports Hall of Fame ===
This is a list of Flyers personnel who have been inducted into the Philadelphia Sports Hall of Fame.

- 2004 – Bobby Clarke and Bernie Parent
- 2005 – Ed Snider
- 2006 – Gene Hart
- 2007 – Bill Barber
- 2008 – Fred Shero
- 2009 – 1973–74 and 1974–75 Philadelphia Flyers
- 2010 – Ron Hextall
- 2011 – Mark Howe
- 2012 – Eric Lindros
- 2013 – John LeClair
- 2014 – Brian Propp
- 2015 – Rick MacLeish and Lou Nolan
- 2016 – Jimmy Watson
- 2017 – Tim Kerr
- 2018 – Reggie Leach
- 2019 – Eric Desjardins
- 2020 – Rick Tocchet
- 2021 – Mark Recchi
- 2022 – Keith Allen
- 2023 – Joe Watson
- 2024 – Rod Brind'Amour
- 2025 – Paul Holmgren

=== Philadelphia Sports Writers Association ===
This is a list of Flyers personnel who have received an award from the Philadelphia Sports Writers Association.

- 1973 – Bobby Clarke (Most Outstanding Athlete)
- 1980 – Bobby Clarke (Most Courageous Athlete)
- 1983 – Bobby Clarke (Good Guy)
- 1988 – Dave Poulin (Good Guy)
- 1989 – Mark Howe (Good Guy)
- 1992 – Tim Kerr (Most Courageous Athlete)
- 1996 – Eric Lindros (Most Outstanding Athlete)
- 2000 – Ron Hextall (Good Guy)
- 2001 – Bobby Clarke (Living Legend)
- 2002 – Rick Tocchet (Good Guy)
- 2003 – Jeremy Roenick (Good Guy)
- 2004 – Keith Primeau (Good Guy)
- 2006 – Simon Gagne (Good Guy)
- 2008 – Daniel Briere (Good Guy)
- 2009 – Bernie Parent (Living Legend)
- 2010 – 2009–10 Philadelphia Flyers (Team of the Year)
- 2011 – Claude Giroux (Most Outstanding Athlete)
- 2013 – Ed Snider (Humanitarian)
- 2014 – Bill Barber (Living Legend)
- 2015 – Kimmo Timonen (Good Guy)
- 2015 – Jakub Voracek (Most Outstanding Athlete)
- 2016 – Shayne Gostisbehere (Most Outstanding Athlete)
- 2017 – Flyers' Wives Charities (Humanitarian)
- 2017 – Eric Lindros (Living Legend)
- 2019 – Jim Jackson (Bill Campbell Award)
- 2019 – Brian Propp (Most Courageous Person)
- 2022 – Tony DeAngelo (Native Son)
- 2022 – Scott Laughton (Good Guy)
- 2023 – 1974 Philadelphia Flyers (Living Legend Team)
- 2023 – Sean Couturier (Good Guy)
- 2023 – Tim Saunders & Steve Coates (Bill Campbell Award)

=== United States Hockey Hall of Fame ===
This is a list of Flyers personnel who have been inducted into the United States Hockey Hall of Fame.

- 2003 – Mark Howe
- 2007 – John Vanbiesbrouck
- 2009 – Tony Amonte
- 2009 – John LeClair
- 2010 – Derian Hatcher
- 2010 – Jeremy Roenick
- 2011 – Mike Emrick
- 2011 – Ed Snider
- 2021 – Paul Holmgren
- 2024 – Kevin Stevens

== See also ==
- List of National Hockey League awards
