= Dave Poulin =

Canadian ice hockey player

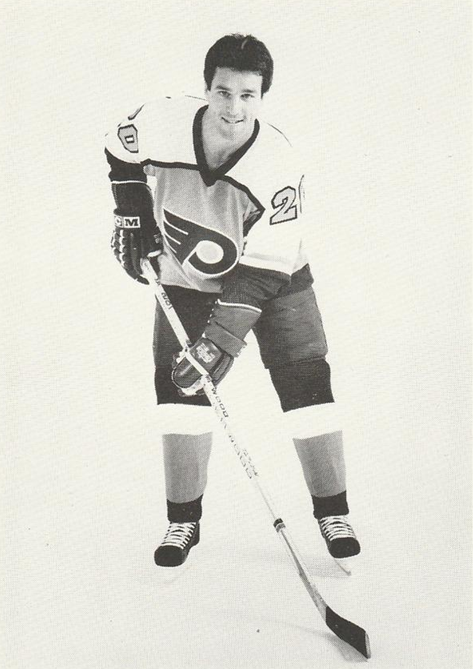
- Poulin in 1983 photo
- Born: December 17, 1958 (age 67) Timmins, Ontario, Canada
- Height: 5 ft 11 in (180 cm)
- Weight: 190 lb (86 kg; 13 st 8 lb)
- Position: Centre
- Shot: Left
- Played for: Rögle BK; Philadelphia Flyers; Boston Bruins; Washington Capitals
- NHL draft: Undrafted
- Playing career: 1982–1995
- Coaching career

Biographical details
- Education: Notre Dame

Playing career
- 1978–1982: Notre Dame
- Position: Center

Coaching career (HC unless noted)
- 1995–2005: Notre Dame

Head coaching record
- Overall: 139–197–50 (.425)
- Tournaments: 0–1 (.000)

David James Poulin (born December 17, 1958) is a Canadian professional ice hockey executive and former player. A centre, Poulin played 13 seasons in the National Hockey League (NHL) with the Philadelphia Flyers, Boston Bruins and Washington Capitals. In his post-playing career, Poulin has coached college hockey, been an Assistant General Manager with the Toronto Maple Leafs and has been an analyst on NHL television broadcasts. Currently, he is Senior Vice-President, Hockey Operations for the Ottawa Senators of the NHL.

== Playing career ==
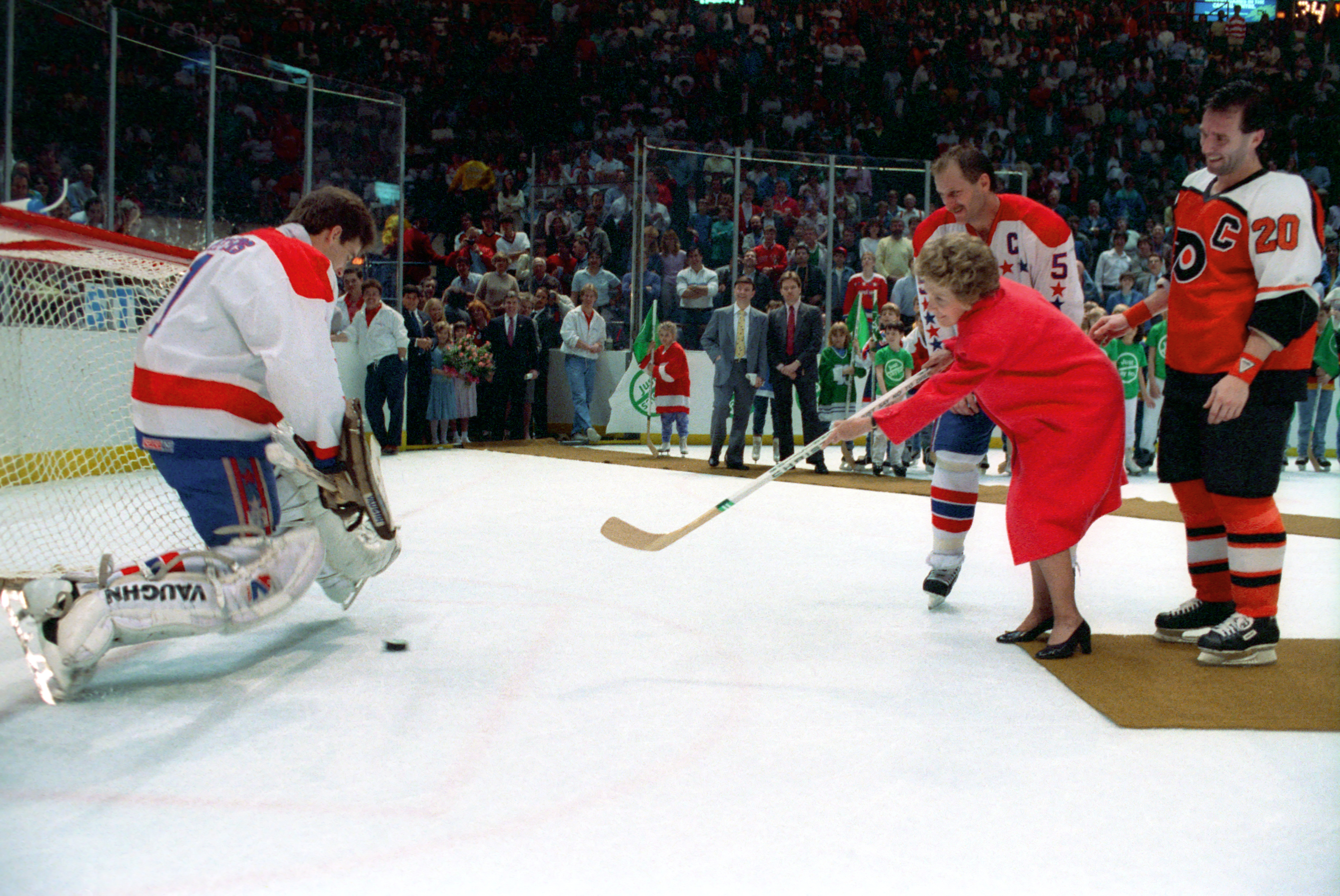

Poulin went undrafted in the NHL entry draft and played with the Notre Dame Fighting Irish at the University of Notre Dame from 1978–1982. He was named to the Second All-Star Team in 1982. Following his NCAA career, he moved to Sweden to play for Rögle BK. Poulin's head coach was Ted Sator, who was also a scout for the Philadelphia Flyers in the National Hockey League. Sator was impressed with Poulin's abilities and called for him to be put on board the Flyers' roster.

=== Philadelphia Flyers ===
In 1982–83, Poulin made the leap to the NHL after a brief stint with the Maine Mariners of the American Hockey League. On the second-last day of the season, Poulin made his debut at Maple Leaf Gardens, scoring two goals in a 6-3 Philadelphia victory.

The following season, Poulin was put on a line with Brian Propp and Tim Kerr. The line became a dangerous offensive line in the league for the bulk of the next three seasons, and in his first full NHL campaign, helped him set a club record (now since passed) for most points by a Flyers rookie with 76. Poulin quickly established himself as a strong leader and a player that could play at both ends of the ice, as he was 25 years old before taking a regular shift in the NHL. Those attributes aided in his being named team captain on the eve of the 1984–85 season, replacing Hall of Famer Bobby Clarke, who had dealt former teammate Darryl Sittler to the Detroit Red Wings on the day he was to take the captaincy.

Poulin continued to be a strong presence offensively and defensively during his eight-year stay in Philadelphia, and overcame debilitating injuries at key times to help the club win. In 1985, though slowed by knee and rib injuries, he helped a young Flyers club reach the 1985 Stanley Cup Finals, where they lost to the Edmonton Oilers in five games. During Game 6 of the Wales Conference Finals at the Spectrum, Poulin scored a memorable two-man disadvantage short-handed goal which helped close out the Quebec Nordiques. Two years later, Poulin missed chunks of playoff time with fractured ribs, but contributed to a pair of series clinchers—a 5–1 win over the New York Islanders in Game 7 of the Patrick Division Finals, and in Game 6 of the Wales Finals at the Montreal Forum. Once healthy, he could not aid Philly in the 1987 Stanley Cup Finals, as the Flyers lost to Edmonton again, but this time in a seven-game thriller. For his efforts during the regular season, he was awarded the Frank J. Selke Trophy in 1986–87 and was named to the 1986 and 1988 NHL All-Star Games. Poulin also played at the Rendez-vous '87 event where he recorded the winner late in the third period of Game 1.

The switch from Mike Keenan to Paul Holmgren as Flyers head coach meant a shift in responsibilities, as Poulin became more of a defensive specialist. By 1989–90, Poulin's play was deteriorating due to injuries and inconsistent play of his teammates, and less than a month after being stripped of the captaincy, was traded to the Boston Bruins for former Flyers centre Ken Linseman.

=== Boston Bruins ===
In his first season with the Bruins, Poulin, along with former teammate Brian Propp, made it all the way to the Stanley Cup Finals against the Edmonton Oilers, but Boston lost in five games. He stayed with the team for three more years which saw him win the King Clancy Memorial Trophy and finish as runner-up for the Frank J. Selke Trophy in 1992–93. He left the team as a free agent following the 1992–93 season and signed on with the Washington Capitals. Poulin lasted another season-and-a-half before retiring from professional play.

== Post-playing career ==
Poulin spent 10 years as head hockey coach at his alma mater, the University of Notre Dame. In 2004, Poulin was inducted into the Flyers Hall of Fame. On July 23, 2009, Toronto Maple Leafs GM Brian Burke introduced Poulin as the club's new Assistant General Manager. In January 2013, Poulin began also serving as the GM of the Toronto Marlies.

On July 22, 2014, the Maple Leafs announced that they had fired Poulin. He has since joined TSN as a hockey analyst on radio and TV. He is also a freelance contributor to the Toronto Star newspaper.

On December 31, 2023, Dave Poulin was hired by the Ottawa Senators to the role of Senior Vice-President, Hockey Operations.

== Awards and honours ==
Award	Year
All-CCHA Second Team	1981-82
NHL All-Star Game	1986, 1988
NHL Frank J. Selke Trophy	1986-87
NHL King Clancy Memorial Trophy	1992-93

- Inducted into the Flyers Hall of Fame on February 23, 2004.

== Career statistics ==
=== Regular season and playoffs ===
			Regular season					Playoffs
Season	Team	League	GP	G	A	Pts	PIM	GP	G	A	Pts	PIM
1977–78	Dixie Beehives	OPJHL	34	28	31	59	59	—	—	—	—	—
1978–79	Notre Dame Fighting Irish	WCHA	37	28	31	59	32	—	—	—	—	—
1979–80	Notre Dame Fighting Irish	WCHA	24	19	24	43	46	—	—	—	—	—
1980–81	Notre Dame Fighting Irish	WCHA	35	13	22	35	53	—	—	—	—	—
1981–82	Notre Dame Fighting Irish	CCHA	39	29	30	59	44	—	—	—	—	—
1982–83	Rögle BK	SWE.2	32	35	27	62	64	—	—	—	—	—
1982–83	Maine Mariners	AHL	16	7	9	16	2	—	—	—	—	—
1982–83	Philadelphia Flyers	NHL	2	2	0	2	2	3	1	3	4	9
1983–84	Philadelphia Flyers	NHL	73	31	45	76	47	3	0	0	0	2
1984–85	Philadelphia Flyers	NHL	73	30	44	74	59	11	3	5	8	6
1985–86	Philadelphia Flyers	NHL	79	27	42	69	49	5	2	0	2	2
1986–87	Philadelphia Flyers	NHL	75	25	45	70	53	15	3	3	6	14
1987–88	Philadelphia Flyers	NHL	68	19	32	51	32	7	2	6	8	4
1988–89	Philadelphia Flyers	NHL	69	18	17	35	49	19	6	5	11	16
1989–90	Philadelphia Flyers	NHL	28	9	8	17	12	—	—	—	—	—
1989–90	Boston Bruins	NHL	32	6	19	25	12	18	8	5	13	8
1990–91	Boston Bruins	NHL	31	8	12	20	25	16	0	9	9	20
1991–92	Boston Bruins	NHL	18	4	4	8	18	15	3	3	6	22
1992–93	Boston Bruins	NHL	84	16	33	49	62	4	1	1	2	10
1993–94	Washington Capitals	NHL	63	6	19	25	52	11	2	2	4	19
1994–95	Washington Capitals	NHL	29	4	5	9	10	2	0	0	0	0
NHL totals			724	205	325	530	482	129	31	42	73	132

=== All-Star Games ===
Year	Location	G	A	P
1986	Hartford	0	0	0
1987 (Rendez-vous '87)	Quebec	1	1	2
1988	St. Louis	0	0	0
All-Star totals		1	1	2

== Head coaching record ==
Record table
Season	Team	Overall	Conference	Standing	Postseason
Notre Dame Fighting Irish (CCHA) (1995–2005)
1995–96	Notre Dame	9–23–4	6–20–4	t-9th	
1996–97	Notre Dame	9–25–1	6–20–1	10th	
1997–98	Notre Dame	18–19–4	12–14–4	t-6th	CCHA first round
1998–99	Notre Dame	19–14–5	15–11–4	4th	CCHA first round
1999–00	Notre Dame	16–18–8	11–10–7	5th	CCHA Semifinals
2000–01	Notre Dame	10–22–7	7–15–6	11th	
2001–02	Notre Dame	16–17–5	12–12–4	t-7th	CCHA Quarterfinals
2002–03	Notre Dame	17–17–6	13–12–3	t-5th	CCHA Quarterfinals
2003–04	Notre Dame	20–15–4	14–11–3	5th	NCAA Midwest Regional semifinals
2004–05	Notre Dame	5–27–6	3–20–5	12th	CCHA first round
Notre Dame:		139–197–50	99–145–41		
Total:		139–197–50			
National champion Postseason invitational champion Conference regular season champion Conference regular season and conference tournament champion Division regular season champion Division regular season and conference tournament champion Conference tournament champion

Sporting positions
Preceded by Bobby Clarke	Philadelphia Flyers captain 1984–89	Succeeded by Ron Sutter
Awards and achievements
Preceded by Troy Murray	Winner of the Frank J. Selke Trophy; 1987	Succeeded by Guy Carbonneau
Preceded by Ray Bourque	Winner of the King Clancy Memorial Trophy; 1993	Succeeded by Adam Graves
