= Barry Ashbee =

Canadian ice hockey player (1939–1977)

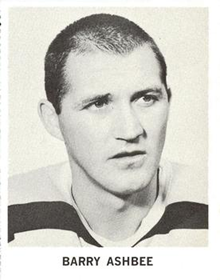
- Born: July 28, 1939 Weston, Ontario, Canada
- Died: May 12, 1977 (aged 37) Philadelphia, Pennsylvania, U.S.
- Height: 5 ft 10 in (178 cm)
- Weight: 180 lb (82 kg; 12 st 12 lb)
- Position: Defence
- Shot: Right
- Played for: Boston Bruins; Philadelphia Flyers
- Coached for: Philadelphia Flyers (assistant)
- Playing career: 1959–1974
- Coaching career: 1974–1977

William Barry Ashbee (July 28, 1939 – May 12, 1977) was a Canadian professional ice hockey defenceman who played five seasons in the National Hockey League (NHL) for the Boston Bruins and Philadelphia Flyers between 1965 and 1974. His career ended prematurely due to an eye injury during a game, which partially blinded him. Ashbee later died of leukemia in 1977.

== Playing career ==
Ashbee started his junior hockey with the Barrie Flyers in the Ontario Hockey Association in 1956, although he spent one season with the Lakeshore Bruins in the Metro Junior B Hockey League for further development in 1957–58. He started his professional career by playing eight seasons with the Hershey Bears of the American Hockey League, although he did play 14 games with the Boston Bruins of the NHL during the 1965–66 season. He made his NHL debut on November 25, 1965, against the New York Rangers. Ashbee missed considerable time due to injuries, including the entire 1966–67 season following surgery to fix a crushed disk in his back, and when the NHL expanded in 1967, he was left unprotected for the expansion draft, and subsequently rejoined the minor league Hershey Bears.

He became an NHL regular with the Philadelphia Flyers during the 1970–71 season, and soon became one of their best defensemen. Ashbee was also known as a physical player, and during a game on January 3, 1973, punched a referee after receiving a penalty, and was given an eight-game suspension, the most since Maurice Richard's suspension in 1955. He was named to the NHL Second All-Star team and won a Stanley Cup with the team during the 1973–74 season, and had a +52 plus/minus rating during the regular season. However, his career also ended that year during the playoffs against the New York Rangers.

== Eye injury ==
On April 28, 1974, during overtime of Game 4 of a Stanley Cup semifinal series, a slap shot by Dale Rolfe of the New York Rangers struck Ashbee in the right eye. He was removed from the ice on a stretcher. According to Ashbee's obituary in The New York Times, the vision in his injured eye was permanently reduced to 15 percent. With such limited vision Ashbee was unable to continue playing, so he announced his retirement on June 4, 1974.

== Retirement and death ==
Ashbee became an assistant coach with the team the next season, though he initially declined the job because he thought it was offered to him out of sympathy. In this role, he worked primarily with the team's defencemen. During his first season as an assistant coach, the Flyers won their second straight Stanley Cup. Ashbee had his name added to the Cup for a second time. Ashbee was told that he had leukemia in April 1977. Though it was caught quickly, the cancer spread fast, and Ashbee died on May 12, 1977. He was buried at Glendale Memorial Gardens Cemetery in Weston, Ontario, his hometown.

His jersey number, 4, was retired by the Flyers on October 13, 1977 and the Barry Ashbee Trophy is now awarded each season to the best defenseman for the Flyers.

== Career statistics ==
=== Regular season and playoffs ===
			Regular season					Playoffs
Season	Team	League	GP	G	A	Pts	PIM	GP	G	A	Pts	PIM
1956–57	Barrie Flyers	OHA	34	0	4	4	23	3	0	0	0	0
1957–58	Lakeshore Bruins	MetJHL	—	—	—	—	—	—	—	—	—	—
1958–59	Barrie Flyers	OHA	53	8	22	30	108	6	0	3	3	12
1959–60	Kingston Frontenacs	EPHL	62	2	11	13	72	—	—	—	—	—
1960–61	Kingston Frontenacs	EPHL	64	4	11	15	75	5	0	0	0	14
1961–62	Kingston Frontenacs	EPHL	35	2	7	9	87	—	—	—	—	—
1962–63	Hershey Bears	AHL	72	0	17	17	94	15	0	2	2	34
1963–64	Hershey Bears	AHL	72	3	6	9	142	6	0	0	0	12
1964–65	Hershey Bears	AHL	66	3	13	16	114	14	0	0	0	22
1965–66	Boston Bruins	NHL	14	0	3	3	14	—	—	—	—	—
1965–66	Hershey Bears	AHL	36	1	10	11	100	3	0	0	0	6
1967–68	Hershey Bears	AHL	65	5	15	20	86	5	0	1	1	4
1968–69	Hershey Bears	AHL	71	5	29	34	130	11	2	5	7	14
1969–70	Hershey Bears	AHL	72	5	25	30	80	7	0	1	1	24
1970–71	Philadelphia Flyers	NHL	64	4	23	27	44	—	—	—	—	—
1971–72	Philadelphia Flyers	NHL	73	6	14	20	75	—	—	—	—	—
1972–73	Philadelphia Flyers	NHL	64	1	17	18	106	11	0	4	4	20
1973–74	Philadelphia Flyers	NHL	69	4	13	17	52	6	0	0	0	2
AHL totals			454	22	115	137	746	61	2	9	11	116
NHL totals			284	15	70	85	291	17	0	4	4	22

== Awards and honors ==
- NHL All-Star Second Team (1974)
- Stanley Cup Champions Player (1974), assistant coach (1975)
- Number retired by the Philadelphia Flyers (4)

== Bibliography ==
- Feige, Timothy (2011), Hockey's Greatest Tragedies: The Broken Heroes of the Fastest Game on Earth, London: Arcturus Publishing, ISBN 978-1-84837-742-4
