= Brian Propp =

Canadian ice hockey player (born 1959)

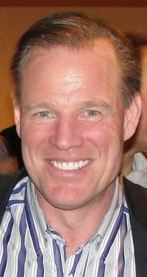
- Propp in 2010
- Born: February 15, 1959 (age 67) Lanigan, Saskatchewan, Canada
- Height: 5 ft 9 in (175 cm)
- Weight: 190 lb (86 kg; 13 st 8 lb)
- Position: Left wing
- Shot: Left
- Played for: Philadelphia Flyers; Boston Bruins; Minnesota North Stars; HC Lugano; Hartford Whalers; HC Anglet
- National team: Canada
- NHL draft: 14th overall, 1979; Philadelphia Flyers
- Playing career: 1979–1994
Medal record
Representing Canada
World Championships
Bronze medal – third place	1982 Finland
Bronze medal – third place	1983 Soviet Union
Canada Cup
Gold medal – first place	1987 Canada
Spengler Cup
Gold medal – first place	1992 Sweden

Brian Phillip Propp (born February 15, 1959) is a Canadian former professional ice hockey left winger who played 15 seasons in the National Hockey League, from 1979 to 1994. He featured in five Stanley Cup Finals with three different NHL teams and won the 1987 Canada Cup with Team Canada.

At the age of 20, Propp was drafted by the Flyers in the NHL draft. He immediately started playing in the league that year, and he recorded 34 goals and 75 total points in his rookie season. Propp would become a mainstay with the Flyers for eleven seasons, which saw him reach the Stanley Cup Final three times (1980, 1985, 1987) while averaging over a point a game in 790 total games with the Flyers. In the middle of the 1989–90 season, Propp was traded to the Boston Bruins and recorded 12 points in the last 14 games of the season as the team made a run to the Stanley Cup Final. Propp became a free agent and signed with the Minnesota North Stars, reaching the Stanley Cup Final again in 1991 after recording 23 points in 23 games. He played two further seasons but declined in play to where he moved over to HC Lugano of the National League A in the middle of the 1992–93 season. He played one last season in the NHL with the Hartford Whalers in the 1993–94 season, recording 29 points in 65 games that saw him become the 41st player to record 1,000 points for a career. He then closed out his career with HC Anglet of FFHG Division 1 in 1995.

In total, Propp scored 425 goals and recorded 579 assists for a total of 1,004 points in his NHL career that saw him play in the NHL All-Star Game five times. He reached the Stanley Cup Final five times and lost each time, but on the international stage he was on the winning rosters for the 1987 Canada Cup and the 1992 Spengler Cup. In 160 Stanley Cup playoff games, he recorded 148 points, which is 34th best all-time in NHL history. Until 2025, his playoff points for a left winger was the most in NHL history.

== Playing career ==
Propp started his career with the Melville Millionaires of the Saskatchewan Junior Hockey League. With the Millionaires, he set a new scoring record (broken years later) with 76 goals and 92 assists for 168 points in 57 games.

He then moved on to the Brandon Wheat Kings of the Western Hockey League, a team that featured future NHL players Brad McCrimmon, Bill Derlago, Laurie Boschman, Dave Semenko, Glen Hanlon, Ray Allison, and Walt Poddubny. Propp won two league scoring titles. At the end of his third season, he was drafted 14th overall by the Philadelphia Flyers in the 1979 NHL entry draft.

=== Philadelphia Flyers ===
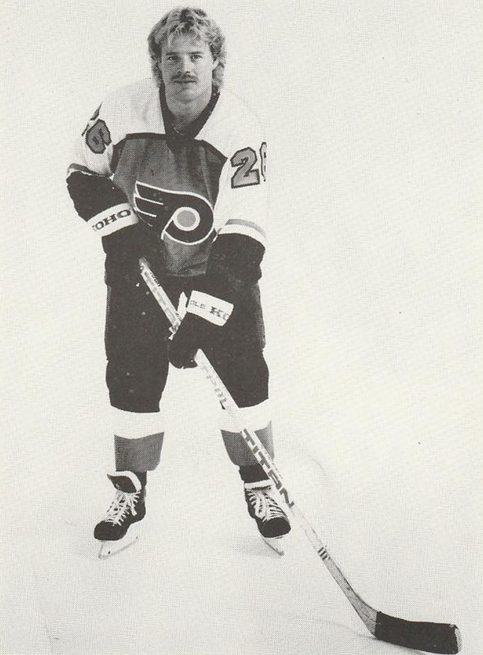
1983 photo of Propp for Philadelphia Flyers

Propp made the Flyers the next season, debuting in 1979. Against the New York Islanders, in his first career game, Propp had an assist and scored the game-winning goal for a two-point night. For his first 20 games, he played on a line with Reggie Leach and Bobby Clarke, before being put on a line with Ken Linseman and Paul Holmgren. It would not be the last time Propp played with two elite players, as he played with Wayne Gretzky and Mario Lemieux for most of the 1987 Canada Cup-winning Canadian team.

In his rookie season, Propp would go on to beat Rick Martin's left-wing rookie scoring record with 75 points in the 1979–80 season. In the 1980 playoffs, he led the all-rookie left wingers in goals (5), assists (10), and points (15), which the Flyers lost in Game 6 of the Stanley Cup Final.

In 1987, Propp had scoring success when he finished runner-up to Wayne Gretzky in the 1987 Playoff scoring. He also led all left wingers that NHL post-season in games played (26), goals (12), assists (16), points (28), plus/minus (+11), power-play goals (5), short-handed goals (1), game-winning goals (3), and shots (104). The Flyers, though, eventually lost to the Oilers in Game 7 of the Stanley Cup Final.

In Game 1 of the 1989 Stanley Cup playoff series against the Montreal Canadiens, which the Flyers lost in Game 6, Propp sustained a concussion from an unpenalized hit by Montreal defenseman Chris Chelios. Chelios hit him with his elbow and Propp fell to the ice, hitting his head against the ice. Though Propp missed only one game, his teammates maintained their anger at Chelios. Finally, with 1:37 left in regulation in Game 6, Flyer goaltender Ron Hextall took matters into his own hands, slamming Chelios into the boards and pummeling him with blows, apparently in retaliation for the hit on Propp. Eventually, Hextall was suspended for 12 games. This incident, as well as other injuries, continued to plague Propp throughout his career. Before the concussion incident, Propp was having a career playoff performance with 14 goals in his team's first 15 games and more than 1.5 points per game.

It took him until his 11th season to score fewer than 65 points in a season, and that was the very same year when he was traded away by the Flyers.

In the 1980s, he led all left wingers in the NHL and was ranked first in 10 different categories: games played (750), assists (465), plus/minus (+298), game-winning goals (55), shots (2529), defensive point shares (16.0), playoff goals (52), playoff points (112), playoff power-play goals (18), and playoff shots (267).

Propp was ranked 2nd in goals (356), points (821), even-strength goals (238), shorthanded goals (20), goals created (322), offensive point shares (54.4), point shares (70.4), playoff games played (116), playoff assists (60), playoff plus/minus (+17), playoff even-strength goals (31), and playoff shorthanded goals (3). In all of the major categories in the regular season and playoffs, he has made the top 3 among left wingers a remarkable 29 times in that decade.

=== Boston Bruins ===
With the Flyers struggling and general manager Bob Clarke wanting to re-tool the club to get younger, Propp was traded at the 1990 trade deadline to the Boston Bruins where he joined long-time Flyer teammate Dave Poulin who had been dealt there six weeks before. With the Bruins, he joined the first-place team in the league and contributed 12 points in the final 14 games of the regular season. Propp, who was a pending free agent unlikely to return to Philadelphia the next season, appreciated former teammate Clarke sending him to a top team. "Clarkie did me a favor trading me to where we had a chance to win." The Bruins continued their success in the post-season and made a run to the Stanley Cup Final where they ultimately fell to the Edmonton Oilers. Propp chipped in four goals and 12 points in 20 playoff games.

That summer, as a free agent, Propp decided to leave the Bruins and sign with the Minnesota North Stars, who now had Bobby Clarke as general manager.

=== Minnesota North Stars ===
After his former club, the Philadelphia Flyers, missed the playoffs for the first time in eighteen years following his trade, general manager Bob Clarke was fired and soon became the general manager of the Minnesota North Stars. Just months after trading him away, Clarke acquired Brian Propp by signing him to a free-agent contract.

Propp enjoyed an excellent debut season in Minnesota, scoring 73 points and helping the team to an improbable run to the Stanley Cup Final, where they lost to the Pittsburgh Penguins. Propp was a huge contributor in the playoffs with eight goals and 23 points in 23 games. Propp moved past Bobby Hull on the all-time playoff scoring list among left wingers to become the highest-scoring left winger in NHL playoff history on April 12, 1991 as the North Stars beat the Chicago Blackhawks 6–0 in Game 5 in the series, with Propp leading the charge by scoring first on Dominik Hašek. He was plagued by health issues the next two years and only played 68 games over those two campaigns, and even took a sabbatical to play in Switzerland in 1993. During his time in Switzerland, he played for Team Canada in the Spengler Cup and helped them to win the tournament.

=== Hartford Whalers ===
Propp suited up for one last season in the NHL, inking a free agent contract with the Hartford Whalers for the 1993–94 NHL season. Although Propp only scored 29 points, it was a productive season for him as he played both his 1000th NHL game and scored his 1000th NHL point on March 19, 1994, which, fittingly, came on a goal against the Philadelphia Flyers.

During the NHL labour stoppage in 1994, Propp played as a player-coach for Anglet Hormadi Élite in France. After the lockout, however, Propp did not return to play in the National Hockey League, nor did he continue his career in Europe opting instead to retire from the game.

Propp holds the unfortunate distinction of appearing in five Stanley Cup Finals, with Philadelphia in 1980, 1985, and 1987, with the Boston Bruins in 1990, and with Minnesota in 1991, and not winning a championship. He played in the NHL All-Star game five times.

Propp finished with 1,004 points over 1,016 NHL games in 15 NHL seasons, and ranks second in Flyers history in goals (369, behind Bill Barber), third in assists (480, behind Bobby Clarke and Claude Giroux), and fourth overall in games played in a Flyers uniform (behind Barber, Clarke, and Giroux).

=== "The Guffaw" ===
Propp was known for his unique goal celebration dubbed "The Guffaw". After scoring a goal, Propp would skate towards center ice, place his right glove under his left arm and raise his right arm in a waving fashion. While making the gesture, Propp would say, "Guffaw!" Propp credits the celebration to comedian Howie Mandel.

During an Atlantic City show in 1986, Mandel used the Guffaw during his comedic routine. Mandel explained a Guffaw was when someone raised their arm and moved it back and forth. Propp adopted "The Guffaw" and it became his signature move, first appearing in the 1986–87 season.

== International play ==
Propp has represented Canada five times in international play.

- 1979 World Junior Championships
- 1982 World Championships
- 1983 World Championships
- 1987 World/Canada Cup
- 1992 Spengler Cup

== Post-playing career ==
In 1999, Propp was named to the MasterCard Canadian Junior All-Time team, which also included Mario Lemieux, Guy Lafleur, Bobby Orr, Denis Potvin, and Bernie Parent. The team was selected based on play in the Canadian Hockey League. Also in 1999, Propp was inducted into the Philadelphia Flyers Hall of Fame. Propp was inducted into the Saskatchewan Rural Hockey Hall of Fame in 2002 and in 2003 he was inducted into the Saskatchewan Provincial Hall of Fame. In 2014, Propp was inducted into the Saskatchewan Hockey Hall of Fame and the Philadelphia Sports Hall of Fame.

A resident of Cinnaminson Township, New Jersey, Propp unsuccessfully ran as a Republican in 2007 for a seat in New Jersey General Assembly in the 7th Legislative District in Burlington County. As of 2015, Propp is the Director of Strategic Relationships for Wolf Commercial Real Estate in Marlton, New Jersey.

== Personal life ==
Propp was born in Lanigan, Saskatchewan, and grew up in Neudorf, Saskatchewan. Propp and his wife, Eileen were married September 26, 2020. Propp has two children, Paige Propp-Hextall and Jackson Propp. Propp is a second cousin of Dylan Wruck. In September 2015, Propp suffered a stroke but ultimately recovered. He released an autobiography Angel on My Wing in 2024.

== In popular culture ==
In The Goldbergs 3rd season episode "12 Tapes for a Penny", the character Barry Goldberg (Troy Gentile) is wearing a Philadelphia Flyers jersey with Propp's name and number 26 on it.

== Records ==
=== WHL ===
- Most Goals in a single game (7)
- Most Game Winning Goals in a single season (16)
- Most Scoring Title's (2)
- Most Consecutive Scoring Title's (2)
- Most Assists by a Rookie in a single season (80)
- Most Goals by a left wing in the WHL, single season (94 in 1978–79)
- Most Assists by a left wing in the WHL, single season (112 in 1977–78)
- Most Points by a left wing in the WHL, single season (194 in 1978–79)
- Most Career Playoff Points by a left winger (77)
- Most Career Hat Tricks by a left winger (13)
- Most Power Play Assists by a left winger (59)

=== NHL ===
- Most Assists in a Single Playoff Game in Stanley Cup Final (4)
- Most Points by a Rookie in Stanley Cup Final (6) "Modern Era"
- Most Goals by a Player not to make the Stanley Cup Final (14)
- Most Power-Play Goals in a Single Post-Season by a Left Winger (8)
- Highest Assists per Game Average in one Stanley Cup Final Game (4.00)
- Most Career Shorthanded Assists in Regular Season by a Left Winger (28)
- Most Career Shorthanded Assists by a Left Winger in Playoffs (5)
- Most Career Assists in the Conference Finals by a Left Winger (18)
- Most Career Goals in the Division Finals by a Left Winger (19)
- Most Career Points in the Division Finals by a Left Winger (38)
- Most Career Game Winning Goals in the Division Finals by a Left Winger (5)
- Most Career Shorthanded Goals in the Division Finals by a Left Winger (2)
- Most Career Power-Play Goals in the Division Finals by a Left Winger (9)
- Highest Career Plus/Minus in the Division Finals by a Left Winger (+13)

=== NHL Franchise ===
- Philadelphia Flyers team record for most game winning goals in a single season (12)
- Philadelphia Flyers team record for most shorthanded goals in a single season (7)
- Philadelphia Flyers team record for most goals in one regular season game (4)
- Philadelphia Flyers team record for most power play goals in one game (3)
- Philadelphia Flyers team record for most assists in a playoff game (4)
- Philadelphia Flyers team record for most shots on goal in a playoff year (104)
- Philadelphia Flyers team record for most games played in a playoff year (26)
- Minnesota North Stars/Dallas Stars team record for most power-play goals in a playoff year (8)

=== Former NHL Records ===
- Most Points by a LW in his rookie season (75) which is now held by Alex Ovechkin who scored (106) points in the 2005-06 season.
- Most Career Playoff Assists by a LW (84) which was surpassed on 4/30/2025 by Brad Marchand when he collected (2) Assists in a Florida Panthers win by eliminating the Tampa Bay Lightning in game five of the 2025 NHL Playoffs.
- Most Career Playoff Points (148) by a LW which was surpassed by Brad Marchand as the Florida Panthers win in Game 7 over the Toronto Maple Leafs on 5/18/2025. Marchand did it in his (169th) game while Propp did it in (9) less games (160) and held the NHL record for 34 years after passing Hall Of Famer Bobby Hull in 1991 playoffs.
- Most Career Multi-Point Games in the Playoffs (42), Marchand broke the 34 year old NHL playoff record with his (43rd) Multi-Point game in a Florida Panthers win in game 7 over the Toronto Maple Leafs on 5/18/2025.

== Career statistics ==
=== Regular season and playoffs ===
			Regular season					Playoffs
Season	Team	League	GP	G	A	Pts	PIM	GP	G	A	Pts	PIM
1975–76	Melville Millionaires	SJHL	57	76	92	168	36	—	—	—	—	—
1976–77	Brandon Wheat Kings	WCHL	72	55	80	135	47	16	14	12	26	5
1977–78	Brandon Wheat Kings	WCHL	70	70	112	182	200	8	7	6	13	12
1978–79	Brandon Wheat Kings	WHL	71	94	100	194	127	22	15	23	38	40
1979–80	Philadelphia Flyers	NHL	80	34	41	75	54	19	5	10	15	29
1980–81	Philadelphia Flyers	NHL	79	26	40	66	110	12	6	6	12	32
1981–82	Philadelphia Flyers	NHL	80	44	47	91	117	4	2	2	4	4
1982–83	Philadelphia Flyers	NHL	80	40	42	82	72	3	1	2	3	8
1983–84	Philadelphia Flyers	NHL	79	39	53	92	37	3	0	1	1	6
1984–85	Philadelphia Flyers	NHL	76	43	54	97	43	19	8	10	18	6
1985–86	Philadelphia Flyers	NHL	72	40	57	97	47	5	0	2	2	4
1986–87	Philadelphia Flyers	NHL	53	31	36	67	45	26	12	16	28	10
1987–88	Philadelphia Flyers	NHL	74	27	49	76	76	7	4	2	6	8
1988–89	Philadelphia Flyers	NHL	77	32	46	78	37	18	14	9	23	14
1989–90	Philadelphia Flyers	NHL	40	13	15	28	31	—	—	—	—	—
1989–90	Boston Bruins	NHL	14	3	9	12	10	20	4	9	13	2
1990–91	Minnesota North Stars	NHL	79	26	47	73	58	23	8	15	23	28
1991–92	Minnesota North Stars	NHL	51	12	23	35	49	1	0	0	0	0
1992–93	Minnesota North Stars	NHL	17	3	3	6	0	—	—	—	—	—
1992–93	HC Lugano	NDA	24	21	6	27	32	9	5	1	6	28
1993–94	Hartford Whalers	NHL	65	12	17	29	44	—	—	—	—	—
1994–95	HC Anglet	FFHG-D1	27	32	19	51	74	—	—	—	—	—
NHL totals			1,016	425	579	1,004	830	160	64	84	148	151

=== International ===
Year	Team	Event	GP	G	A	Pts	PIM
1979	Canada	WJC	5	2	1	3	2
1982	Canada	WC	10	3	1	4	4
1983	Canada	WC	10	4	4	8	6
1987	Canada	CC	9	2	2	4	2
1992	Canada	SC	3	3	1	4	2
Junior totals			5	2	1	3	2
Senior totals			32	12	8	20	14
International Totals			37	14	9	23	16

== Awards ==
Award	Year(s)
NHL All-Star Game	1980, 1982, 1984, 1986, 1990
SJHL All-Star Team	1976
SJHL Most Valuable Player	1976
SJHL Rookie of the Year	1976
WHL Brownridge Trophy (Top Scorer)	1978, 1979
WHL First-All Star Team	1978, 1979
WHL Rookie of the Year	1977
WHL Second All-Star Team	1977
WHL President's Championship Trophy	1979
Campbell/Western Conference Champions	1980, 1991
Prince of Wales/Eastern Conference Champions	1985, 1987, 1990

== See also ==
- List of NHL players with 1,000 points
- List of NHL players with 1,000 games played

Preceded by Danny Lucas	Philadelphia Flyers' first-round draft pick 1979	Succeeded by Mike Stothers
