= Jimmy Watson (ice hockey) =

Canadian ice hockey player

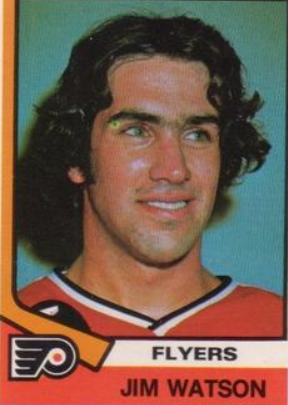
- Watson in 1974 card
- Born: August 19, 1952 (age 73) Smithers, British Columbia, Canada
- Height: 6 ft 0 in (183 cm)
- Weight: 190 lb (86 kg; 13 st 8 lb)
- Position: Defence
- Shot: Left
- Played for: Philadelphia Flyers
- National team: Canada
- NHL draft: 39th overall, 1972; Philadelphia Flyers
- Playing career: 1972–1982

James Charles Watson (born August 19, 1952) is a Canadian former professional ice hockey defenceman. He played ten seasons in the National Hockey League (NHL) for the Philadelphia Flyers from 1973 to 1982. With the Flyers he won the Stanley Cup twice, in 1974 and 1975. He was inducted into the Flyers' Hall of Fame in February 2016. Internationally, Watson played two games in the 1976 Canada Cup for Canada.

== Biography ==
Watson was born in Smithers, British Columbia. He played with his older brother Joe for several seasons with the Flyers, winning the Stanley Cup together in 1974 and 1975.

Watson currently coaches youth hockey for the Delco Phantoms Midget 18U-AA team. His previous team, the Philadelphia Little Flyers Midget 16U American AAA team won the 2008-2009 and 2009-2010 AYHL Championships. Watson also runs the Jim Watson Hockey Academy and Jim Watson Hockey Camp at Iceworks Skating Complex in Aston, Pennsylvania.

On June 30, 2015, the Flyers announced that Watson would be inducted into the Flyers Hall of Fame in a pre-game ceremony on February 29, 2016.

Watson is the father of two sons who have played professional hockey. Chase Watson played college hockey with the Providence Friars and later played in the minors with the Reading Royals in the ECHL. Brett Watson played in two professional games for the Wheeling Nailers.

== Career statistics ==
=== Regular season and playoffs ===
			Regular season					Playoffs
Season	Team	League	GP	G	A	Pts	PIM	GP	G	A	Pts	PIM
1968–69	Calgary Centennials	WCHL	52	2	15	17	26	11	1	4	5	0
1969–70	Calgary Centennials	WCHL	35	3	15	18	18	—	—	—	—	—
1970–71	Calgary Centennials	WCHL	64	9	35	44	118	11	3	7	10	8
1971–72	Calgary Centennials	WCHL	66	13	52	65	50	13	3	9	12	6
1972–73	Philadelphia Flyers	NHL	4	0	1	1	5	2	0	0	0	0
1972–73	Richmond Robins	AHL	73	5	33	38	83	4	1	2	3	6
1973–74	Philadelphia Flyers	NHL	78	2	18	20	44	17	1	2	3	41
1974–75	Philadelphia Flyers	NHL	68	7	18	25	72	17	1	8	9	10
1975–76	Philadelphia Flyers	NHL	79	2	34	36	66	16	1	8	9	6
1976–77	Philadelphia Flyers	NHL	71	3	23	26	35	10	1	2	3	2
1977–78	Philadelphia Flyers	NHL	71	5	12	17	62	12	7	8	6	4
1978–79	Philadelphia Flyers	NHL	77	9	13	22	52	8	0	2	2	2
1979–80	Philadelphia Flyers	NHL	71	5	18	23	51	15	0	4	4	20
1980–81	Philadelphia Flyers	NHL	18	2	2	4	6	—	—	—	—	—
1981–82	Philadelphia Flyers	NHL	76	3	9	12	99	4	0	1	1	2
NHL totals			613	38	148	186	492	101	5	34	39	89

=== International ===
Year	Team	Event	GP	G	A	Pts	PIM
1976	Canada	CC	2	0	0	0	2
Senior totals			2	0	0	0	2

== Awards and honours ==
- Bill Hunter Memorial Trophy (1971–72)
- WCHL First All-Star Team (1971–72)
- Barry Ashbee Trophy (1975–76, 1977–78)
- Played in NHL All-Star Game (1975, 1976, 1977, 1978, 1980)
- Inducted into the Flyers Hall of Fame February 29, 2016
