= Tim Kerr =

Canadian ice hockey player (born 1960)

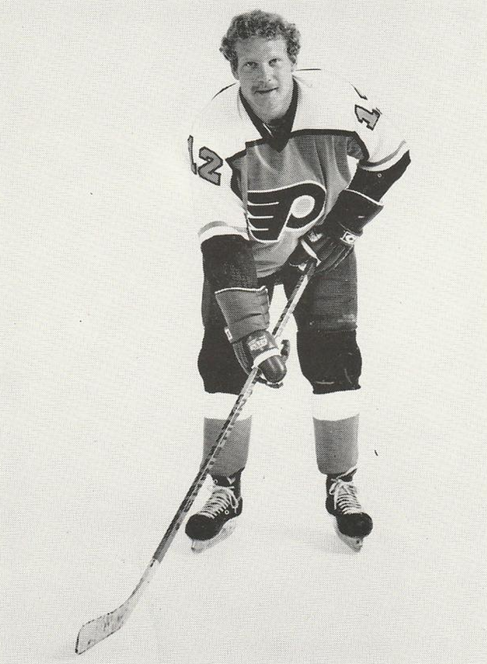
- Kerr with the Philadelphia Flyers in 1983
- Born: January 5, 1960 (age 66) Windsor, Ontario, Canada
- Height: 6 ft 3 in (191 cm)
- Weight: 225 lb (102 kg; 16 st 1 lb)
- Position: Right wing
- Shot: Right
- Played for: Philadelphia Flyers; New York Rangers; Hartford Whalers
- NHL draft: Undrafted
- Playing career: 1980–1993

Timothy E. Kerr (born January 5, 1960) is a Canadian former professional ice hockey right winger who played 13 seasons in the National Hockey League (NHL) for the Philadelphia Flyers, New York Rangers and Hartford Whalers. Known for his goal-scoring offence, Kerr reached the NHL's prestigious 50-goal plateau on four occasions during his career, and he ranks 10th all time (minimum 200 goals) in goals per game with 0.565. He was inducted to the Flyers Hall of Fame in 1994.

== Playing career ==
Kerr was signed as an undrafted free agent by the Philadelphia Flyers in 1980. Though initially a winger with hands that could bruise an opponent's face as well as beat an opposing goaltender, it took three seasons before he staked his reputation as a lethal sniper. Kerr missed the majority of the 1982-83 season with knee issues and a broken leg, but turned things around starting in the 1983-84 season. That's when he began his team-record run of four consecutive 50-goal campaigns, in the process setting the NHL single-season record for power play goals with 34 in the 1985–86 season.

During the first round of the '85 playoffs, against the New York Rangers, Kerr set a still-standing NHL single-game record by scoring four goals in a span of 8:16 in the second period of an eventual 6–5 victory at Madison Square Garden which enabled Philadelphia to sweep the best-of-five series. The next season was particularly interesting, in that in September 1985 he was hospitalized with aseptic meningitis at the outset, but recovered sufficiently to set a career best of 58 goals. The following year, Kerr again victimized NHL goaltenders for 58 goals, finishing second in the NHL to Wayne Gretzky.

However, Kerr's ascension into the ranks of NHL superstars was hindered by injuries and bad luck. In the 1985 playoffs, a knee injury hampered his ability to play in the final two rounds of the postseason. In 1987, a shoulder injury suffered in the second round cost him the entire final two series against the Montreal Canadiens and Edmonton Oilers. As a result of the setback, Kerr endured five shoulder operations in a 14-month period and missed all but a handful of the 1987-88 regular season, while being largely ineffective in Philly's seven-game loss to the Washington Capitals in the Patrick Division Semifinals. While Kerr would rebound and play 69 games and score 48 goals in 1988-89—a feat which earned him the Bill Masterton Trophy for perseverance and dedication to the sport—he never again played more than half the schedule the rest of his career.

He was left exposed in the 1991 expansion draft, and after being claimed by the San Jose Sharks, was quickly dealt to the New York Rangers. One more season with the Hartford Whalers ensued, before his retirement at age 33.

Kerr currently ranks 9th all-time in goals per game (minimum 500 games played) with 370 goals in 655 NHL regular season games for 0.56 per game.

Kerr is 2nd all time in career shooting percentage (20.3) in NHL playoff history (among players with 40+ career goals). He is one of fifteen players in NHL history with four 50-goal seasons.

== Personal life ==
On October 16, 1990, his wife, Kathy, died at the age of 30 due to a fast-spreading infection, ten days after the birth of their first child, a daughter named Kimberly.

He met his current wife, Midge, at the Tim Kerr Run in Avalon, New Jersey in 1991. Kerr has two daughters, Kimberly and Kayleigh, and three sons named Garrett, Wesley, and Tanner. Kerr currently resides in Moorestown Township, New Jersey and Avalon, New Jersey. Wesley and Tanner both graduated from University of Sciences Philadelphia and Wesley currently works for his father as a sales associate for Tim Kerr's Sotheby's International Realty. Kimberly graduated from West Virginia University.

Kerr is the owner of Tim Kerr's Sotheby's International Realty in Avalon, New Jersey, which sells and rents homes in both Avalon and Stone Harbor, New Jersey. In addition, Kerr previously owned the Pensacola Ice Flyers and part-owner of the Roanoke Rail Yard Dawgs, teams of the Southern Professional Hockey League.

== Awards and honours ==
- Named to the NHL Second All-Star Team (1987)
- Awarded the Bill Masterton Trophy (1989)
- Played in the NHL All-Star Game (1984, 1985, 1986)
- Inducted into the Flyers Hall of Fame on March 8, 1994.

== NHL records ==
- Holds single-season record for most power play goals (34 in 1985–86)
- Holds playoff record for most power play goals in a period: (3)
- Holds playoff record for fastest 4-goals in a game: (8:16)
- Shares playoff record for most goals in a period (4 on April 13, 1985)
- Shares playoff record for most points in one period: (4)
- Shares NHL Playoff record for most goals by a player not to make Stanley Cup Finals (14)

== Philadelphia Flyers franchise records ==
- Most 50-goal seasons (4)
- Most regular season power play goals in one season (34)
- Most regular season career power play goals (145)
- Most regular season hat tricks in one season (5)
- Most regular season career hat tricks (17)
- Highest regular season career goals per game average (0.60)
- Highest regular season goals per game average in one season (0.77)
- Most regular season goals scored in one game (4)
- Most regular season goals scored in one period (3)
- Most regular season power play goals scored in one game (3)
- Fastest 3 goals by a player in one regular season game (2:27)
- Most playoff goals scored in one period (4)
- Most playoff goals scored in one series (10)
- Most playoff points scored in one series (15)
- Most playoff power play goals in one post-season (8)
- Most playoff power play goals in one series (5)
- Most playoff power play goals scored in one period (3)
- Most playoff power play goals scored in one game (3)
- Most playoff assists in one period (3)
- Most playoff points in one period (4)
- Most playoff career hat tricks (3)
- Fastest 3 goals in playoffs by one player in one game (3:24)
- Fastest 4 goals in playoffs by one player in one game (8:16)

== NHL achievements ==
- Led NHL in power play goals in one season (1984–85, 1985–86, 1986–87)
- Top 3 in goals in one season (1983–84, 1985–86, 1986–87)
- Top 5 in game-winning goals in one season (1984–85, 1985–86, 1986–87)
- Top 5 in goals per game average in one season (1984–85, 1985–86, 1986–87, 1988–89)
- Top 5 in hat tricks in one season (1988–89)
- Top 10 in goals in one season (1983–84, 1984–85, 1985–86, 1986–87, 1988–89)
- Top 10 in points in one season (1986–87)
- Top 10 in plus/minus in one season (1986–87)
- Top 10 in goals per game average in one season (1983–84, 1984–85, 1985–86, 1986–87, 1988–89, 1989–90)
- Top 10 in shooting percentage in one season (1980–81, 1986–87)
- Top 10 in even strength goals in one season (1983–84, 1984–85, 1986–87)
- Top 10 in goals created per game in one season (1984–85, 1986–87, 1988–89)
- Top 10 in points per game in one season (1986–87)
- Top 10 in offensive point shares in one season (1984–85, 1986–87)
- Top 10 in point shares in one season (1986–87)
- Top 10 in shots in one season (1983–84, 1985–86, 1986–87)

== Career statistics ==
=== Regular season and playoffs ===
			Regular season					Playoffs
Season	Team	League	GP	G	A	Pts	PIM	GP	G	A	Pts	PIM
1976–77	Windsor Royals	WOHL	38	34	28	62	85	—	—	—	—	—
1976–77	Windsor Spitfires	OMJHL	9	2	4	6	7	3	0	0	0	0
1977–78	Kingston Canadians	OMJHL	67	14	25	39	33	5	0	0	0	0
1978–79	Kingston Canadians	OMJHL	57	17	25	42	27	6	1	1	2	2
1979–80	Kingston Canadians	OMJHL	63	40	33	73	39	3	0	1	1	16
1979–80	Maine Mariners	AHL	7	2	4	6	2	—	—	—	—	—
1980–81	Philadelphia Flyers	NHL	68	22	23	45	84	10	1	3	4	2
1981–82	Philadelphia Flyers	NHL	61	21	30	51	138	4	0	2	2	2
1982–83	Philadelphia Flyers	NHL	24	11	8	19	6	2	2	0	2	0
1983–84	Philadelphia Flyers	NHL	79	54	39	93	29	3	0	0	0	0
1984–85	Philadelphia Flyers	NHL	74	54	44	98	57	12	10	4	14	13
1985–86	Philadelphia Flyers	NHL	76	58	26	84	79	5	3	3	6	8
1986–87	Philadelphia Flyers	NHL	75	58	37	95	57	12	8	5	13	2
1987–88	Philadelphia Flyers	NHL	8	3	2	5	12	6	1	3	4	4
1988–89	Philadelphia Flyers	NHL	69	48	40	88	73	19	14	11	25	27
1989–90	Philadelphia Flyers	NHL	40	24	24	48	34	—	—	—	—	—
1990–91	Philadelphia Flyers	NHL	27	10	14	24	8	—	—	—	—	—
1991–92	New York Rangers	NHL	32	7	11	18	12	8	1	0	1	0
1992–93	Hartford Whalers	NHL	22	0	6	6	7	—	—	—	—	—
NHL totals			655	370	304	674	596	81	40	31	71	58

Preceded by Bob Bourne	Bill Masterton Trophy winner 1989	Succeeded by Gord Kluzak
