= 32nd National Hockey League All-Star Game =

Professional ice hockey exhibition game

32nd NHL All-Star Game
	1	2	3	Total
Campbell	1	1	1	3
Wales	2	0	4	6
- Date: February 5, 1980
- Arena: Joe Louis Arena
- City: Detroit
- MVP: Reggie Leach (Philadelphia)
- Attendance: 21,002

The 32nd National Hockey League All-Star Game was held in Joe Louis Arena in Detroit, home to the Detroit Red Wings, on February 5, 1980. The Wales Conference all-star team won for the fifth consecutive time. Reggie Leach was voted MVP after scoring one goal and one assist. This was Wayne Gretzky's first appearance and Gordie Howe's 23rd and final All-Star game appearance.

== Team rosters ==
	Campbell Conference	Wales Conference
Final score	3	6
Head coach	(Canada) Al Arbour (New York Islanders)	(Canada) Scotty Bowman (Buffalo Sabres)
Lineup	(Canada) 33 - G Pete Peeters (Philadelphia Flyers); (Canada) 35 - G Tony Esposito (Chicago Blackhawks); (Sweden) 2 - D Lars Lindgren (Vancouver Canucks); (Canada) 4 - D Mike McEwen (Colorado Rockies); (Canada) 5 - D Robert Picard (Washington Capitals); (Canada) 6 - D Ron Greschner (New York Rangers); (Canada) 20 - D Jimmy Watson (Philadelphia Flyers); (Canada) 25 - D Norm Barnes (Philadelphia Flyers); (Canada) 7 - LW Bill Barber (Philadelphia Flyers); (Canada) 12 - LW Morris Lukowich (Winnipeg Jets); (Canada) 14 - LW Blair MacDonald (Edmonton Oilers); (Sweden) 16 - C Kent Nilsson (Atlanta Flames); (Canada) 18 - RW Rick MacLeish (Philadelphia Flyers); (Canada) 19 - C Bryan Trottier (New York Islanders); (Canada) 22 - RW Mike Bossy (New York Islanders); (Canada) 24 - C Bernie Federko (St. Louis Blues); (Canada) 26 - C Brian Propp (Philadelphia Flyers); (Canada) 27 - LW Reggie Leach (Philadelphia Flyers); (Canada) 77 - C Phil Esposito (New York Rangers); (Canada) 99 - C Wayne Gretzky (Edmonton Oilers)	(Canada) 1 - G Don Edwards (Buffalo Sabres); (Canada) 30 - G Gilles Meloche (Minnesota North Stars); (Canada) 3 - D Ron Stackhouse (Pittsburgh Penguins); (Canada) 4 - D Craig Hartsburg (Minnesota North Stars); (Canada) 6 - D Jim Schoenfeld (Buffalo Sabres); (Canada) 19 - D Larry Robinson (Montreal Canadiens); (Canada) 24 - D Dave Burrows (Toronto Maple Leafs); (United States) 28 - D Reed Larson (Detroit Red Wings); (Canada) 7 - C Jean Ratelle (Boston Bruins); (Canada) 8 - C Real Cloutier (Quebec Nordiques); (Canada) 9 - RW Gordie Howe (Hartford Whalers); (Canada) 10 - LW Guy Lafleur (Montreal Canadiens); (Canada) 11 - C Gilbert Perreault (Buffalo Sabres); (Canada) 12 - LW Mike Murphy (Los Angeles Kings); (Canada) 15 - C Butch Goring (Los Angeles Kings); (Canada) 16 - C Marcel Dionne (Los Angeles Kings); (Canada) 17 - RW Danny Gare (Buffalo Sabres); (Canada) 23 - LW Bob Gainey (Montreal Canadiens); (Canada) 26 - LW Steve Payne (Minnesota North Stars); (Canada) 27 - C Darryl Sittler (Toronto Maple Leafs)

== Game summary ==
#	Score	Team	Goalscorer (assists)	Time
First period
1	1-0	Wales	Robinson	3:58
2	2-0	Wales	Payne (Murphy - Goring)	4:19
3	2-1	Campbell	Leach (McEwen)	8:02 DN
Penalties : Hartsburg (Wal.) 12:23
Second period
4	2-2	Campbell	Nilsson (Federko - MacLeish)	6:03
Penalties : none
Third period
5	2-3	Campbell	Propp (Esposito - Leach)	4:14
6	3-3	Wales	Stackhouse (Sittler - Lafleur)	11:40
7	4-3	Wales	Hartsburg (Cloutier - Ratelle)	12:40
8	5-3	Wales	Larson (Payne - Perreault)	13:12
9	6-3	Wales	Cloutier (Howe)	16:06
Penalties : none

Goaltenders :

- Wales : Edwards (29:27 minutes), Meloche (30:33).
- Campbell : Esposito (15:10), Peeters (44:50).

Shots on goal :

- Wales (32) 10 - 05 - 17
- Campbell (31) 15 - 04 - 11

Referee : Dave Newell

Linesmen : John D'Amico, Ray Scapinello

- MVP: Reggie Leach, (Philadelphia Flyers)

=== Notes ===
- Gary Sargent named to Wales team, but unable to participate due to injury. Although it was the biggest stage the sport's two greatest players ever shared, Gretzky and Howe, the game always will be remembered for the thunderous standing ovation fans showered upon Howe, Gretzky's childhood idol and one of the Motor City's most fabled sports legends. Howe was introduced last by the PA announcer and received a standing ovation for four minutes, before the announcer interrupted the crowd.

== See also ==
- 1979–80 NHL season
