= Bill Barber =

Canadian ice hockey player (born 1952)

- Hockey Hall of Fame, 1990
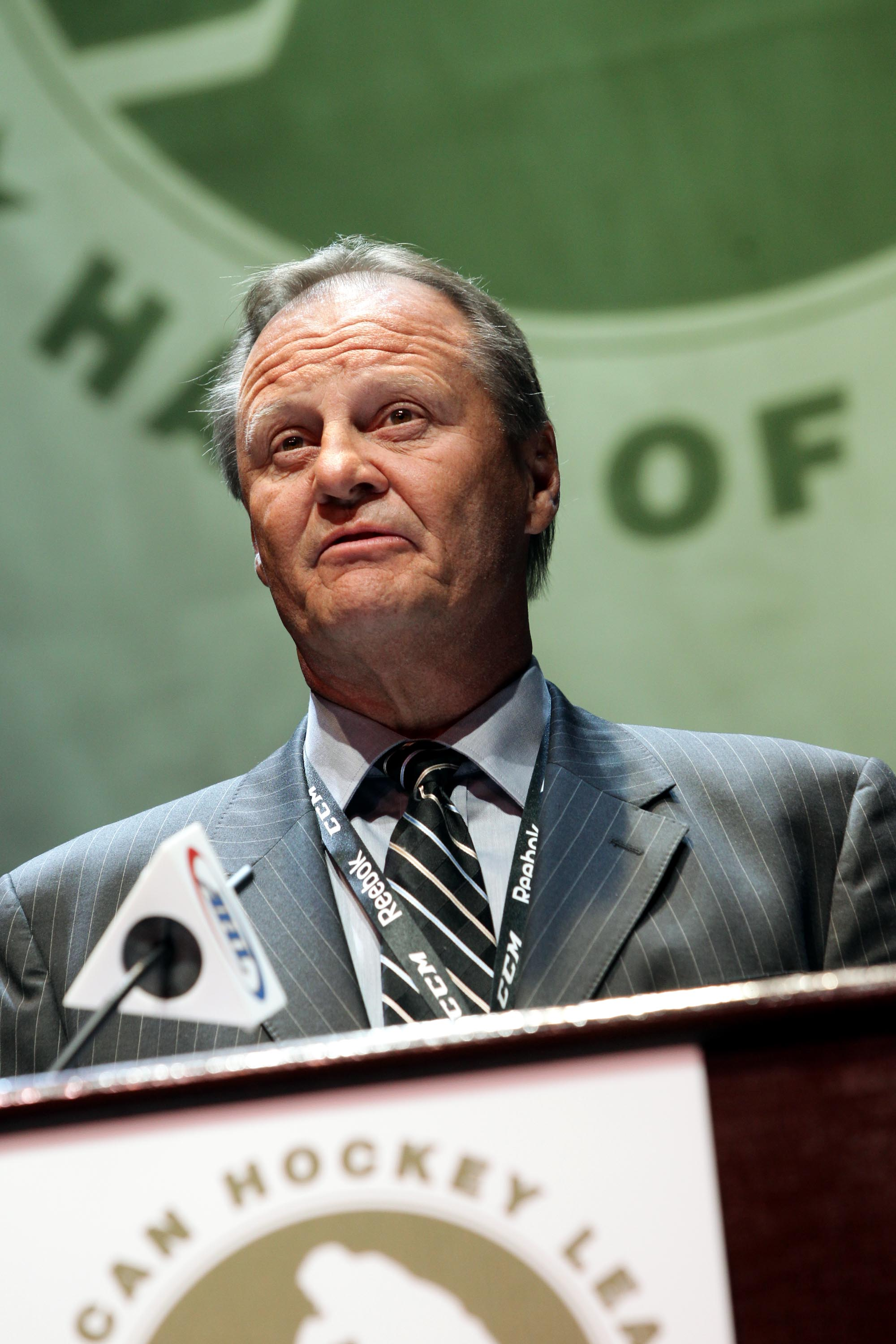
- Barber in 2013
- Born: July 11, 1952 (age 74) Callander, Ontario, Canada
- Height: 6 ft 0 in (183 cm)
- Weight: 195 lb (88 kg; 13 st 13 lb)
- Position: Left wing
- Shot: Left
- Played for: Philadelphia Flyers
- Coached for: Philadelphia Flyers
- National team: Canada
- NHL draft: 7th overall, 1972; Philadelphia Flyers
- Playing career: 1972–1984
- Coaching career: 1985–2002
Medal record
Representing Canada
Ice hockey
World Championships
Bronze medal – third place	1982 Finland

William Charles Barber (born July 11, 1952) is a Canadian former professional ice hockey player. He played as a left winger for 12 seasons with the Philadelphia Flyers in the National Hockey League (NHL). As part of the famed LCB (Leach, Clarke, Barber) line, Barber helped lead the Flyers to the franchise's two Stanley Cups in 1974 and 1975. His 53 goals in the Stanley Cup playoffs for the Flyers remains a franchise record that he shares with Rick MacLeish. He was inducted into the Hockey Hall of Fame in 1990. He is currently a scouting consultant with the Flyers.

== Playing career ==
Barber was drafted by the Flyers, seventh overall, in the first round of the 1972 draft. He was called up after 11 games in the AHL with the Richmond Robins. In his first season with the Flyers, Barber scored 30 goals and 34 assists and was a contender for the Calder Memorial Trophy for rookie of the year.

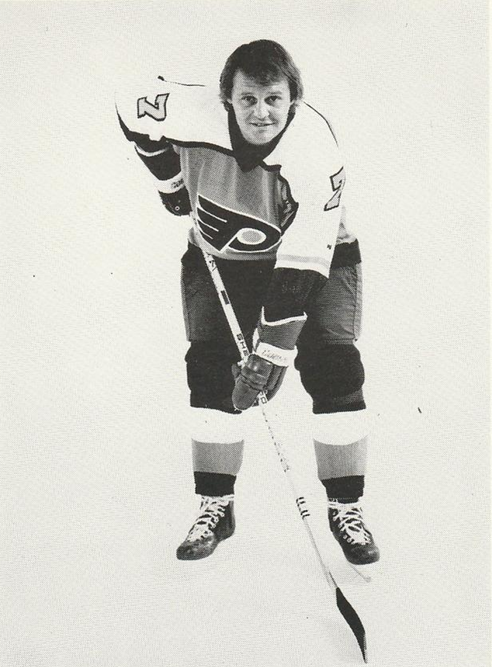
Barber with the Philadelphia Flyers in 1983

Barber was converted to left wing by coach Fred Shero. He scored at least 20 goals every season. His best season was 50 goals and 62 assists in the 1975–76 season. In the Flyers' successful 1974 and 1975 Stanley Cup playoffs campaigns, Barber contributed three and six goals respectively. Barber also contributed another six goals in an unsuccessful 1976 playoff run. In addition to his respectable scoring abilities, Barber was also a well rounded player. On the power play he was equally valuable for setting up the play as he was for pulling the trigger, and if forced into a defensive role, he was capable.

In the 1976 Canada Cup, Barber scored one of his most famous goals while playing for Team Canada. Behind in the final against Czechoslovakia, Barber scored to send the game into overtime, and an eventual Team Canada victory.

He was a team leader for the next decade. In 1979–80, the Flyers had their record 35-game unbeaten streak, and Barber was in the centre of it all. He helped the Flyers reach the 1980 Stanley Cup Final with a number of key playoffs goals against the New York Rangers and Minnesota North Stars.

Barber captained the Flyers in the 1981–82 season and part of 1982–83. As of the end of the 2012–13 season, he still holds the Flyers regular season career scoring record with 420 goals. He is tied for the lead for Flyers career playoffs goals with Rick MacLeish; both have 53 playoffs tallies.

Barber was forced to retire as a player after the 1984–85 season after being unable to return from reconstructive knee surgery in the spring of 1984. He officially retired on August 22, 1985, and the Flyers retired his number 7, on October 7, 1990, just after he was inducted into the Hockey Hall of Fame.

On January 14, 2017, Barber played before a sold-out crowd of over 19,000 at the Wells Fargo Center in the Flyers' 50th anniversary alumni game against the alumni of the Pittsburgh Penguins, playing alongside his longtime linemates, Bobby Clarke and Reggie Leach. The game ended in a 3–3 tie. Before the game, Barber announced that it would be his last alumni game.

== Coaching and executive career ==
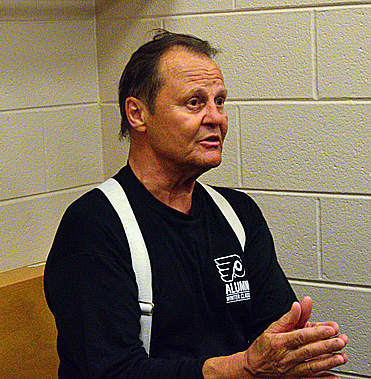
Barber after the 2017 Alumni game on January 14, 2017

After his playing career, Barber started coaching. He coached the Hershey Bears for 16 games in 1985. He was the Flyers assistant coach between 1985 and 1988. He coached the Flyers farm team, the Phantoms, for four years, winning his and the team's first Calder Cup in 1998. He was the Flyers' head coach from December 2000 until April 2002, winning the Jack Adams Trophy after 2000–01.

Barber was the director of player personnel for the Tampa Bay Lightning, a position he held from August 2002 to June 2008. Barber's name was added to the Stanley Cup for a third time in 2004 with Tampa Bay. On October 13, 2008, he returned to the Flyers organization when he was named a scouting consultant.

== Personal life ==
Barber and his late wife, Jenny, have two children. Jenny Barber died from lung cancer in 2001.

On September 25, 2010, the Bill Barber Sports Complex was opened in his honour in his hometown, Callander, Ontario.

== Career statistics ==
=== Regular season and playoffs ===
			Regular season					Playoffs
Season	Team	League	GP	G	A	Pts	PIM	GP	G	A	Pts	PIM
1967–68	North Bay Trappers	NOJHA	34	18	35	53	44	—	—	—	—	—
1968–69	North Bay Trappers	NOJHA	48	32	38	70	100	—	—	—	—	—
1969–70	Kitchener Rangers	OHA-Jr.	54	37	49	86	42	8	5	10	15	22
1970–71	Kitchener Rangers	OHA-Jr.	61	46	59	105	129	4	2	3	5	2
1971–72	Kitchener Rangers	OHA-Jr.	62	44	63	107	89	5	2	7	9	6
1972–73	Richmond Robins	AHL	11	9	5	14	4	2	0	0	0	2
1972–73	Philadelphia Flyers	NHL	69	30	34	64	46	11	3	2	5	22
1973–74	Philadelphia Flyers	NHL	75	34	35	69	54	17	3	6	9	18
1974–75	Philadelphia Flyers	NHL	79	34	37	71	66	17	6	9	15	8
1975–76	Philadelphia Flyers	NHL	80	50	62	112	104	16	6	7	13	18
1976–77	Philadelphia Flyers	NHL	73	20	35	55	62	10	1	4	5	2
1977–78	Philadelphia Flyers	NHL	80	41	31	72	34	12	6	3	9	2
1978–79	Philadelphia Flyers	NHL	79	34	46	80	22	8	3	4	7	10
1979–80	Philadelphia Flyers	NHL	79	40	32	72	17	19	12	9	21	23
1980–81	Philadelphia Flyers	NHL	80	43	42	85	69	12	11	5	16	0
1981–82	Philadelphia Flyers	NHL	80	45	44	89	85	4	1	5	6	4
1982–83	Philadelphia Flyers	NHL	66	27	33	60	28	3	1	1	2	2
1983–84	Philadelphia Flyers	NHL	63	22	32	54	36	—	—	—	—	—
NHL totals			903	420	463	883	623	129	53	55	108	109

=== International ===
Year	Team	Event	GP	G	A	Pts	PIM
1976	Canada	CC	7	2	0	2	4
1982	Canada	WC	10	8	1	9	10
Senior totals			17	10	1	11	14

=== All-Star Games ===
Year	Location	G	A	Pts
1975	Montreal	0	0	0
1976	Philadelphia	0	0	0
1978	Buffalo	1	0	1
1980	Detroit	0	0	0
1981	Los Angeles	1	1	2
1982	Washington	0	0	0
All-Star totals		2	1	3

== Coaching record ==
=== NHL ===
Team	Year	Regular season							Postseason
Team	Year	G	W	L	T	OTL	Pts	Finish	Result
PHI	2000–01	54	31	13	7	3	(100)	2nd in Atlantic	Lost in Conference Quarterfinals
PHI	2001–02	82	42	27	10	3	97	1st in Atlantic	Lost in Conference Quarterfinals
Total		136	73	40	17	6			

=== AHL ===
Team	Year	Regular season							Postseason
Team	Year	G	W	L	T	OTL	Pts	Finish	Result
HER	1984–85	16	6	9	1	0	(63)	6th in South	Did not qualify
PHI	1996–97	80	49	18	13	3	111	1st in Mid-Atlantic	Lost in Division Finals
PHI	1997–98	80	47	21	12	2	106	1st in Mid-Atlantic	Won Calder Cup
PHI	1998–99	80	47	22	9	2	105	1st in Mid-Atlantic	Lost in Conference Finals
PHI	1999–00	80	44	31	3	2	93	3rd in Mid-Atlantic	Lost in Division Semifinals
Total		336	193	101	38	9			

== Awards ==
Award	Year(s)
Canada Cup champion	1976
Calder Cup champion	1998
Class Guy Award (Philadelphia Flyers team award)	1981
Jack Adams Award	2001
NHL first All-Star team	1976
NHL second All-Star team	1979, 1981
Stanley Cup champion	1974, 1975, 2004

== See also ==
- List of NHL players with 100-point seasons
- List of NHL players who spent their entire career with one franchise

Preceded by Pierre Plante	Philadelphia Flyers' first-round draft pick 1972	Succeeded by Mel Bridgman
Preceded by Mel Bridgman	Philadelphia Flyers captain 1981–82	Succeeded by Bobby Clarke
Preceded by Joel Quenneville	Jack Adams Award Winners; 2001	Succeeded by Bob Francis
Preceded by Craig Ramsay	Head Coach of the Philadelphia Flyers; 2000–02	Succeeded by Ken Hitchcock
