= 29th National Hockey League All-Star Game =

Professional ice hockey exhibition game

29th NHL All-Star Game
| | 1 | 2 | 3 | Total |
|---|---|---|---|---|
| Wales | 3 | 4 | 0 | 7 |
| Campbell | 1 | 0 | 4 | 5 |
- Date: January 20, 1976
- Arena: Spectrum
- City: Philadelphia
- MVP: Peter Mahovlich (Montreal)
- Attendance: 16,436

The 29th National Hockey League All-Star Game was held at the Spectrum in Philadelphia, home of the Philadelphia Flyers, on January 20, 1976. The Wales Conference All-Star team defeated the Campbell Conference 7–5 after opening up a 6–1 lead in the second period. Peter Mahovlich was voted most valuable player of the game after scoring a goal and three assists.

== Team Lineups ==
=== Wales Conference All-Stars ===
- Coach: (Canada) Floyd Smith (Buffalo Sabres)

| # | Nat. | Player | Pos. | Team |
Goaltenders
| 1 | (Canada) | Wayne Thomas | | Toronto Maple Leafs |
| 29 | (Canada) | Ken Dryden | | Montreal Canadiens |
Defencemen
| 2 | (Canada) | Larry Robinson | | Montreal Canadiens |
| 3 | (Canada) | Dave Burrows | | Pittsburgh Penguins |
| 4 | (Canada) | Jerry Korab | | Buffalo Sabres |
| 5 | (Canada) | Guy Lapointe | | Montreal Canadiens |
| 21 | (Sweden) | Borje Salming | | Toronto Maple Leafs |
| 22 | (Canada) | Brad Park | | Boston Bruins |
Forwards
| 6 | (Canada) | Bill Clement | C | Washington Capitals |
| 7 | (Canada) | Rick Martin | LW | Buffalo Sabres |
| 8 | (Canada) | Dan Maloney | LW | Detroit Red Wings |
| 9 | (Canada) | Pierre Larouche | C | Pittsburgh Penguins |
| 10 | (Canada) | Guy Lafleur | RW | Montreal Canadiens |
| 11 | (Canada) | Craig Ramsay | LW | Buffalo Sabres |
| 12 | (Canada) | Al MacAdam | RW | California Golden Seals |
| | (Canada) | Gregg Sheppard | C | Boston Bruins |
| 16 | (Canada) | Marcel Dionne | C | Los Angeles Kings |
| 17 | (Canada) | Steve Shutt | LW | Montreal Canadiens |
| 19 | (Canada) | Jean Pronovost | RW | Pittsburgh Penguins |
| 20 | (Canada) | Pete Mahovlich | C | Montreal Canadiens |

=== Campbell Conference All-Stars ===
- Coach: (Canada) Fred Shero (Philadelphia Flyers)

| # | Nat. | Player | Pos. | Team |
Goaltenders
| 1 | (Canada) | Glenn Resch | | New York Islanders |
| 35 | (Canada) | Wayne Stephenson | | Philadelphia Flyers |
Defencemen
| 2 | (Canada) | Carol Vadnais | | New York Rangers |
| 4 | (Canada) | Phil Russell | | Chicago Black Hawks |
| 5 | (Canada) | Denis Potvin | | New York Islanders |
| 6 | (Canada) | Andre Dupont | | Philadelphia Flyers |
| 20 | (Canada) | Jim Watson | | Philadelphia Flyers |
Forwards
| 7 | (Canada) | Garry Unger | C | St. Louis Blues |
| 8 | (Canada) | Steve Vickers | LW | New York Rangers |
| 9 | (Canada) | Wilf Paiement | RW | Kansas City Scouts |
| 10 | (Canada) | Dennis Ververgaert | RW | Vancouver Canucks |
| 11 | (Canada) | Bill Barber | LW | Philadelphia Flyers |
| 12 | (Canada) | Bill Goldsworthy | RW | Minnesota North Stars |
| 14 | (Canada) | John Marks | LW | Chicago Black Hawks |
| 15 | (Canada) | Billy Harris | RW | New York Islanders |
| 17 | (United States) | Curt Bennett | C | Atlanta Flames |
| 18 | (Canada) | Tom Lysiak | C | Atlanta Flames |
| 19 | (Canada) | Bryan Trottier | C | New York Islanders |
| 21 | (Canada) | Rick MacLeish | C | Philadelphia Flyers |
| 27 | (Canada) | Reggie Leach | RW | Philadelphia Flyers |

G = Goaltenders; D = Defencemen; C = Center; LW/RW = Left Wing/Right Wing

== Game summary ==
| # | Score | Team | Goalscorer (Assist(s)) | Time |
First period
| 1 | 1-0 | Wales | Martin (Mahovlich - Lafleur) | 6:01 |
| 2 | 1-1 | Campbell | Bennett (Dupont) | 16:59 |
| 3 | 2-1 | Wales | Mahovlich (Lapointe - Lafleur) | 18:31 |
| 4 | 3-1 | Wales | Park (Mahovlich - Martin) | 19:00 |
Penalties : None
Second period
| 5 | 4-1 | Wales | MacAdam (Maloney) | 9:34 |
| 6 | 5-1 | Wales | Lafleur (Mahovlich - Martin) | 11:54 |
| 7 | 6-1 | Wales | Dionne | 13:51 |
| 8 | 7-1 | Wales | Maloney (Larouche - MacAdam) | 16:59 |
Penalties : Barber (Cam.) 17:29
Third period
| 9 | 7-2 | Campbell | Ververgaert (Trottier - Harris) | 4:33 |
| 10 | 7-3 | Campbell | Ververgaert (Trottier - Harris) | 4:43 |
| 11 | 7-4 | Campbell | Potvin | 14:17 |
| 12 | 7-5 | Campbell | Vickers (Unger - Potvin) | 14:46 |
Penalties : Marks (Cam.) 15:26

Goaltenders :

- Wales : Dryden (29:34 minutes), Thomas (30:26 minutes).
- Campbell : Resch (29:18), Stephenson (29:42 minutes).

Shots on goal :

- Wales (42) 13 - 17 - 12
- Campbell (24) 09 - 06 - 09

Referee : Lloyd Gilmour

Linesmen : Neil Armstrong, John D'Amico

== See also ==
- 1975–76 NHL season

== Notes ==
Borje Salming made history by becoming the first European born and -bred player to participate in an NHL All-Star game (Stan Mikita, Ken Hodge and Walt Tkaczuk were also born in Europe but did not start to play hockey before moving to Canada at an early age). From 1976 onwards, every NHL All-Star game to date has featured at least one European player.

Reigning Hart Trophy winner Bobby Clarke was selected but did not play. He was replaced by his Philadelphia Flyers' teammate Rick MacLeish.

In addition to the NHL All-Star Game, the Major League Baseball All-Star Game, the NBA All Star Game, and the Men's Final Four were all held in Philadelphia in honor of the location of the signing of the Declaration of Independence, as 1976 was the United States Bicentennial.
