= Blood Freak =

- VHS cover
- Directed by: Brad F. Grinter
- Written by: Brad F. Grinter; Steve Hawkes
- Produced by: Brad F. Grinter; Steve Hawkes
- Starring: Steve Hawkes; Dana Cullivan; Heather Hughes; Bob Currier
- Cinematography: Ron N. Sill
- Edited by: Gil Ward
- Music by: Gil Ward
- Production company: Sampson Motion Picture Production Company
- Distributed by: Variety Films
- Release date: October 12, 1972
- Running time: 86 minutes
- Country: United States
- Language: English
- Budget: $25,000

Blood Freak (also known as Blood Freaks) is a 1972 American horror film directed by Brad F. Grinter and starring Steve Hawkes, Dana Cullivan, Heather Hughes, and Bob Currier.

== Plot ==
While riding down the Florida highway on his motorbike, Vietnam veteran Herschell helps a young religious girl called Angel, whose car has broken down. She takes Herschell back to her home, where her sister, Anne and many local friends of hers are smoking pot. Herschell refuses to smoke any, as Angel had warned him about them; however, Anne continues attempting to seduce him. Angel decides that Herschell should stay with them until he gets back on his feet in life. Whilst cleaning the girls' pool, Anne encourages Herschell to smoke a joint; he does, and finds himself addicted.

Herschell gets a job at a local turkey farm, where he meets two scientists who are experimenting by testing certain chemicals on turkey meat. Herschell agrees to participate in a test by eating some of the turkey meat; to convince him to agree, the scientists bribe him with more marijuana. After eating the whole turkey, he passes out on the farm. He suffers a seizure, and the two scientists later find him, and, worried about being investigated about the possible death of Herschell, they dump his body in the woodlands. But Herschell is not dead—he wakes up to find he has a giant turkey's head in place of his own head. He is also still addicted to drugs, but, instead of smoking marijuana, he now craves the blood of other addicts.

He comes to Anne for help, and at first she agrees. However, after Herschell kills three people to appease his habit, Anne finally appeals to two friends to stop Herschell by beheading him with a machete. Just as the turkey-headed Herschell is killed, the action jumps back to Herschell again waking up in the woods—the entire sequence in which Herschell has a turkey head was only a hallucination. He is discovered by the owner of the turkey farm, who contacts Angel at the rehab center where she volunteers. Angel comes to collect Herschell and, after urging him to pray to God for assistance, takes him to the center to recover from his addiction. At the film's end, Herschell is reunited with a joyous Anne.

Throughout the film, director Brad Grinter periodically appears to offer his commentary on the action.

== Cast ==
- Steve Hawkes as Herschell
- Dana Cullivan as Ann
- Heather Hughes as Angel
- Bob Currier
- Anne Shearin
- Linda Past
- Debbie Smith
- Sandy Kneelen
- Domink Grutta
- Randy Grinter

== Release ==
=== Home media ===
The film was released on DVD by Image Entertainment on September 24, 2002. Image re-released the film as a part of its "Freak Show Box Set" on February 3, 2004. It was last released by Frolic Pictures as a double-feature with The Pyx on May 1, 2018.

== Reception ==
Dennis Schwartz from Ozus' World Movie Reviews gave the film a grade C+, writing, "Everything about this movie is Ed Wood bad, from the acting, the screenplay and production values. It's so bad a film, that it demands to be seen by those who call themselves weird film addicts or those who just have a perverse need to see a film that's so unbelievable it must be seen to be believed." Bill Gibron from PopMatters listed the film as one of his guilty pleasures, writing, "The kinetic, freestyle editing, the endless shots of Grinter babbling like an improvising, smut peddling Criswell, and actors who play dead by wincing and wiggling as all the while effects gore F/X across their face makes Blood Freak a first-rate crazed capon caper." G. Noel Gross from DVD Talk recommended the film, writing, "Abandon all hope of comprehension and savor the abject carnage unleashed by this turkey-headed dope fiend." Joseph A. Ziemba from Bleeding Skull! enjoyed the film, writing, "Blood Freak is a trash film revelation. Peerless, disturbed, and completely stupid, it’s a glorification of all things crooked and perplexing in 70s exploitation films."

== See also ==
- List of American films of 1972
