= Philadelphia Flyers =

National Hockey League team in Philadelphia, Pennsylvania

- 2026–27 Philadelphia Flyers season
- Conference: Eastern
- Division: Metropolitan
- Founded: 1967
- History: Philadelphia Flyers; 1967–present
- Home arena: Xfinity Mobile Arena
- City: Philadelphia, Pennsylvania
- Team colors: Burnt orange, black, white
- Media: NBC Sports Philadelphia; NBC Sports Philadelphia Plus; Peacock; WPEN (97.5 The Fanatic); WMMR
- Owner: Comcast Spectacor
- General manager: Daniel Brière
- Head coach: Rick Tocchet
- Captain: Sean Couturier
- Minor league affiliates: Lehigh Valley Phantoms (AHL); Reading Royals (ECHL)
- Stanley Cups: 2 (1973–74, 1974–75)
- Conference championships: 8 (1974–75, 1975–76, 1976–77, 1979–80, 1984–85, 1986–87, 1996–97, 2009–10) (Note: Regular season conference champion (1974–75, 1975–76, 1976–77, 1979–80) *Conference champion in playoffs (1984–85, 1986–87, 1996–97, 2009–10))
- Presidents' Trophies: 0 (Note: The Presidents' Trophy was not introduced until 1985–86. Had the trophy existed since league inception, the Flyers franchise would have won three Presidents' Trophies. The winning seasons would have been 1974–75, 1979–80, and 1984–85.)
- Division championships: 16 (1967–68, 1973–74, 1974–75, 1975–76, 1976–77, 1979–80, 1982–83, 1984–85, 1985–86, 1986–87, 1994–95, 1995–96, 1999–00, 2001–02, 2003–04, 2010–11)
- Official website: nhl.com/flyers

The Philadelphia Flyers are a professional ice hockey team based in Philadelphia. The Flyers compete in the National Hockey League (NHL) as a member of the Metropolitan Division in the Eastern Conference. They are the second NHL team to represent Philadelphia, with the first team, the Philadelphia Quakers, only playing one season in 1930–31. The team plays its home games at Xfinity Mobile Arena in the South Philadelphia Sports Complex, an indoor arena they share with the Philadelphia 76ers of the National Basketball Association (NBA) and the Philadelphia Wings of the National Lacrosse League (NLL). Part of the 1967 NHL expansion, the Flyers are the first of the expansion teams in the post-Original Six era to win the Stanley Cup, victorious in 1974 and again in 1975. Since their two Stanley Cup victories, they have been in the Final six other times, most recently in 2010.

The Flyers play their home games on Broad Street, first at the Spectrum from 1967 until 1996, and then at Xfinity Mobile Arena since 1996. Their association with Broad Street, along with the players consistently brawling with other teams, earned them the nickname "Broad Street Bullies" during the 1970s.

== History ==
=== NHL in Philadelphia before 1967 ===
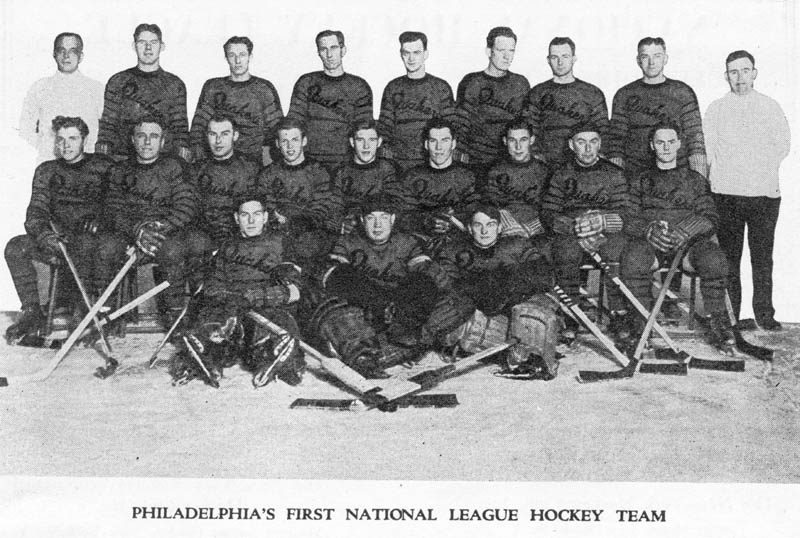
The Philadelphia Quakers, who played during the 1930–31 season, was Philadelphia's first NHL franchise.

Prior to 1967, the Philadelphia Quakers played one season in the NHL after the Pittsburgh Pirates relocated in 1930. The Quakers' only season established a single season NHL record for futility, compiling a dismal record of 4–36–4, still the fewest games ever won in a season by an NHL club. The Quakers suspended operations after that season to leave the Can-Am League's Philadelphia Arrows as Philadelphia's lone hockey team. The Quakers' dormant NHL franchise was finally canceled by the league in 1936. The Arrows would also suspend operations in 1942 following the United States' involvement in World War II.

In 1946, a group led by Montreal and Philadelphia sportsman Len Peto announced plans to put another NHL team in Philadelphia, to build a $2.5 million rink to seat 20,000 where the Phillies' former ballpark stood at Broad and Huntingdon Streets, and to acquire the franchise of the old Montreal Maroons. The latter was held by the Canadian Arena Company, owner of the Montreal Canadiens. However, Peto's group was unable to raise funding for the new arena project by the league-imposed deadline, and the NHL cancelled the Maroons franchise.

While attending a basketball game on November 29, 1964, at the Boston Garden, Ed Snider, the then-vice-president of the Philadelphia Eagles, observed a crowd of Boston Bruins fans lining up to purchase tickets to see a last-place ice hockey team. He began making plans for a new arena upon hearing the NHL was looking to expand due to fears of a competing league taking hold on the West Coast and the desire for a new television contract in the United States. Snider formed a group made up of himself, Bill Putnam, Jerome Schiff and Philadelphia Eagles owner Jerry Wolman to the league.

On April 4, 1966, Putnam announced a name-the-team contest. Details of the contest were released on July 12. Snider's sister, Phyllis, thought that a name that fits well with Philadelphia was "Flyers". Instead of going through with the naming contest, Ed Snider took his sister's advice. The team name was announced on August 3.

=== Early years (1967–1971) ===
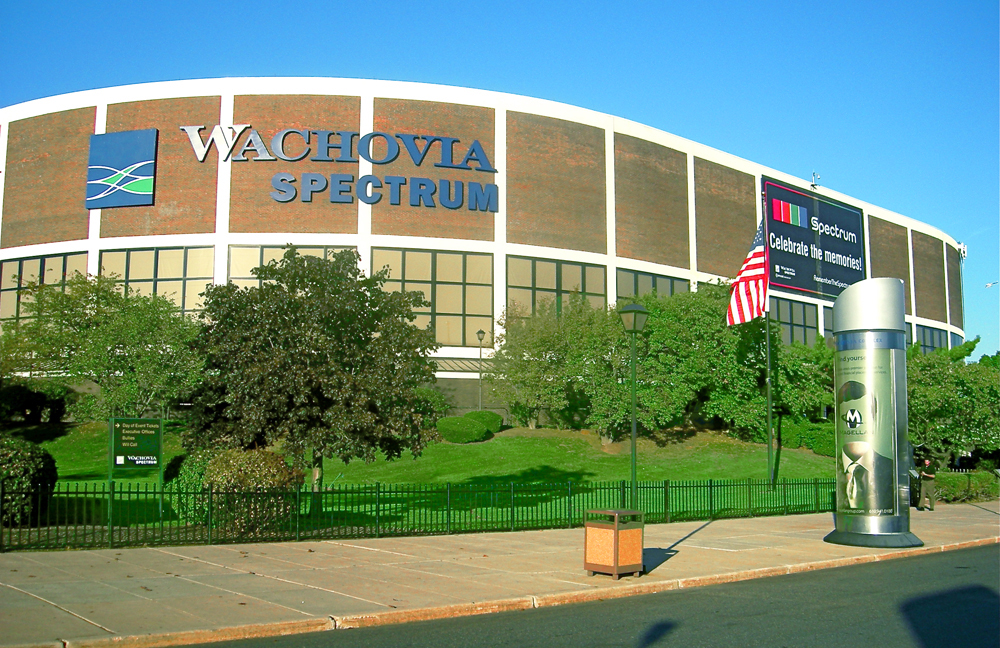
The Spectrum was the home arena for the Philadelphia Flyers from 1967 to 1996.

Among the Flyers' 20 selections in the 1967 NHL expansion draft were goaltender Bernie Parent, Ed Van Impe, and Gary Dornhoefer. Their debut in 1967–68 occurred on October 11, 1967, losing 5–1 to the California Seals. The Flyers won their division with a sub-.500 record despite being forced to play their last seven home games on the road due to a storm blowing parts of the Spectrum's roof off. The Flyers were defeated by the St. Louis Blues in the first round in seven games.

Van Impe was named team captain in the offseason. In the 1969 playoffs, they lost to St. Louis again, this time in a four-game sweep. Not wanting his team to be physically outmatched again, majority owner Ed Snider instructed general manager Bud Poile to acquire bigger, tougher players. While head coach Keith Allen soon after replaced Poile as general manager, this mandate eventually led to one of the most feared teams to ever take the ice in the NHL. In the 1969 draft, they selected Bobby Clarke at 17th overall. Keeping to Snider's mandate, the team also drafted enforcer Dave Schultz.

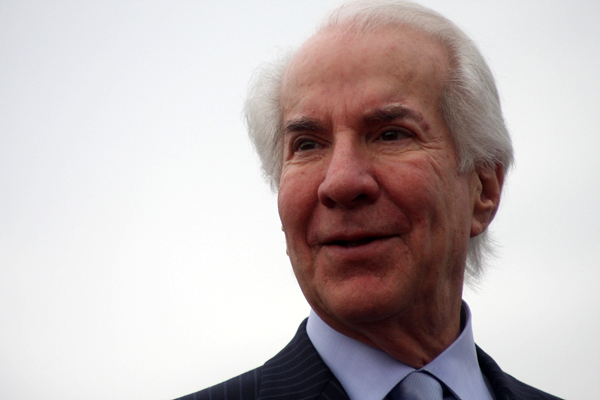
Ed Snider, the team's initial co-owner

Clarke's 15 goals and 31 assists in his rookie season earned him a trip to the NHL All-Star Game. However, the team struggled in 1969–70, recording only 17 wins — the fewest in franchise history — while also setting the NHL record for most ties in a season (24). They lost the tiebreaker for the final playoff spot to the Oakland Seals, missing the playoffs for the first time.

On December 11, 1969, the Flyers introduced what became one of the team's best-known traditions: playing a recording of Kate Smith singing "God Bless America" instead of "The Star-Spangled Banner" with specific games. The perception was that the team was more successful on these occasions, so the tradition grew. The move was initially done by Flyers Promotion Director Lou Scheinfeld as a way to defray national tensions at the time of the Vietnam War: Scheinfeld noticed that people regularly left their seats and walked around during the anthem, but showed more respect and often sang along to "God Bless America".

In 1970–71, the Flyers bounced back from the previous season and returned to the playoffs, but were swept by the Chicago Black Hawks in the first round. Even though the team improved their record in his second season behind the bench, head coach Vic Stasiuk was replaced by Fred Shero in the offseason. The team was involved in a three-way trade that sent Bernie Parent to the Toronto Maple Leafs while receiving Rick MacLeish from the Boston Bruins.

=== Broad Street Bullies (1971–1981) ===
Bobby Clarke continued to progress as he led the team in scoring in 1971–72 and became the first Flyer to win an NHL award, the Bill Masterton Memorial Trophy for perseverance, sportsmanship and dedication to hockey. However, the Flyers lost their final game of the season, losing the head-to-head tiebreaker to the Pittsburgh Penguins and missed the playoffs.

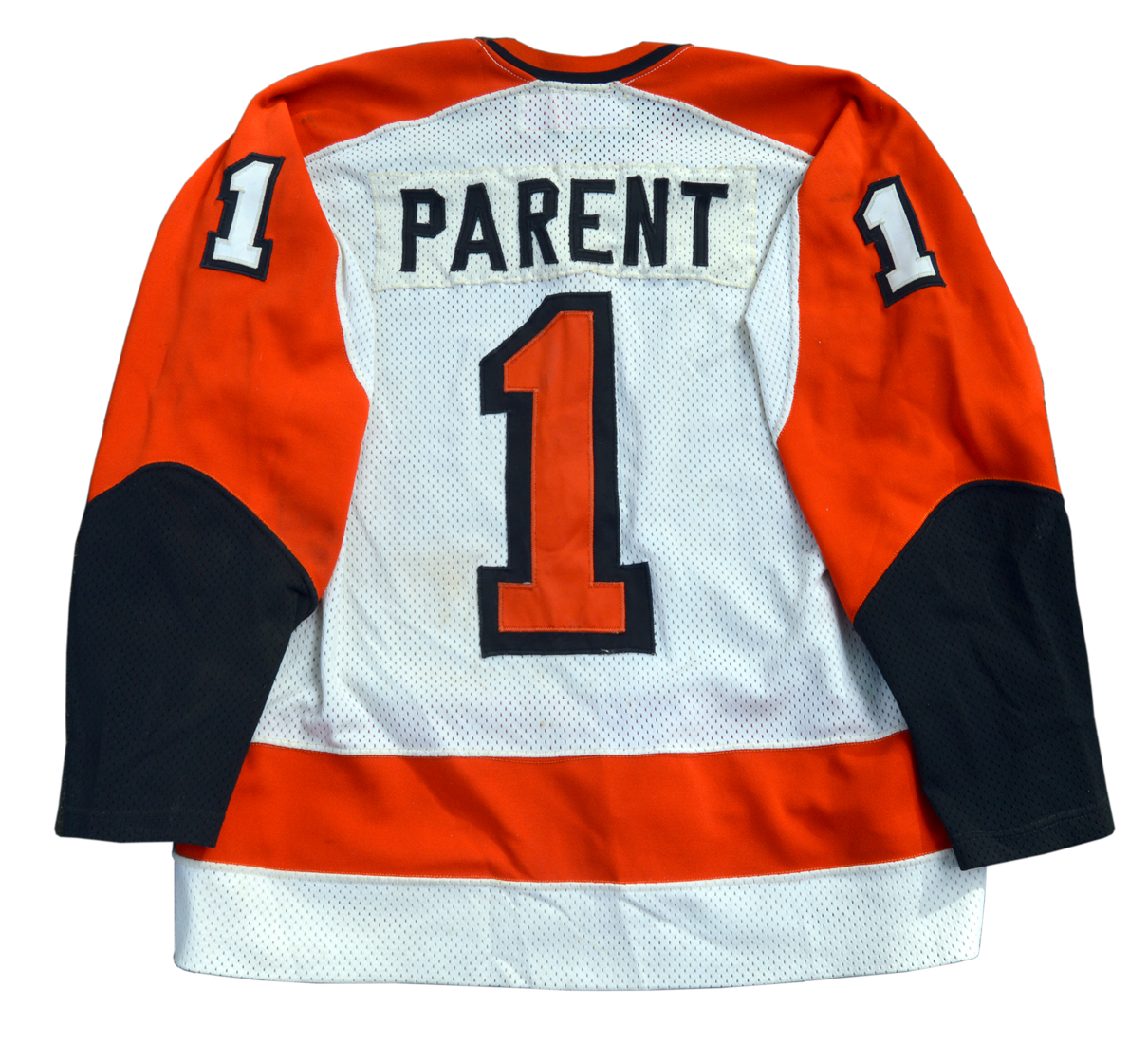
Jersey of Flyers' goaltender Bernie Parent, who played for the Flyers from 1967 to 1971 and again from 1973 to 1979.

In the 1972–73 season, the Flyers earned the "Broad Street Bullies" nickname, coined by Jack Chevalier and Pete Cafone of the Philadelphia Bulletin on January 3, 1973, after a 3–1 brawling victory over the Atlanta Flames that led Chevalier to write in his game account, "The image of the fightin' Flyers spreading gradually around the NHL, and people are dreaming up wild nicknames. They're the Mean Machine, the Bullies of Broad Street and Freddy's Philistines." Cafone wrote the accompanying headline: "Broad Street Bullies Muscle Atlanta." Rick MacLeish became the first Flyer to score 50 goals in a season and the Flyers recorded their first winning season.

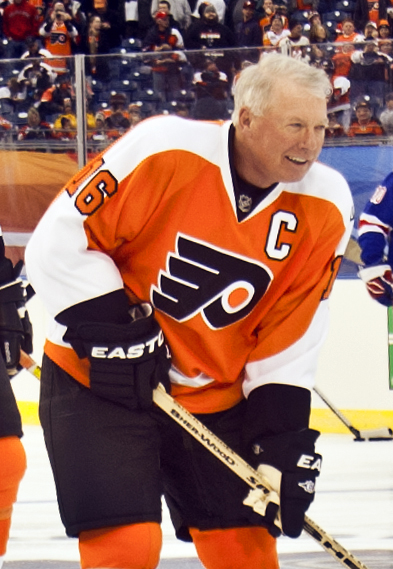
Bobby Clarke played for the Flyers from 1969 to 1984.

An overtime goal by Gary Dornhoefer in game five turned the tide of their first-round series with the Minnesota North Stars in the Flyers' favor, as the Flyers got their first playoff series win in six games. The Flyers subsequently created a statue of Dornhoefer's overtime goal. However, they were outmatched in the semifinals by the Montreal Canadiens, losing in five games. After the season, Clarke became the first expansion team player to be awarded the Hart Memorial Trophy as the NHL's most valuable player.

==== 1973–74 Stanley Cup champions ====
Goaltender Bernie Parent returned to the franchise in the offseason. The Flyers continued their rough-and-tumble ways, led by Dave Schultz's 348 penalty minutes, and reached the top of the West Division with a record of 50–16–12. Parent won 47 games for the Flyers, a record which stood in the NHL for 33 years. Since the Flyers, along with Chicago, allowed the fewest goals in the league, Parent also shared the Vezina Trophy with Chicago's Tony Esposito.

In the playoffs, the Flyers swept the Atlanta Flames in four games in the first round. In the semifinals, the Flyers defeated the New York Rangers in seven games, becoming the first team to win a series against an Original Six team. In the 1974 Stanley Cup Final, they defeated the Bobby Orr-led Boston Bruins in six games. Parent, with his shutout against Boston in game six, won the Conn Smythe Trophy as the MVP of the playoffs.

==== 1974–75 Stanley Cup champions ====
Under the 1974–75 season, Dave Schultz topped his mark from the previous season by setting an NHL record for penalty minutes with 472. Clarke's efforts earned him his second Hart Trophy and Parent was the lone recipient of the Vezina Trophy. The Flyers as a team improved their record slightly with a mark of 51–18–11, the best record in the NHL. After a first-round bye, the Flyers swept the Toronto Maple Leafs and faced the New York Islanders in the semifinals. Despite holding a 3–0 series lead against the Islanders, New York tied the series. The Flyers defeated the Islanders in game seven 4–1.

Facing the Buffalo Sabres in the Stanley Cup Final, the Flyers won the first two games at home. Game three, played in Buffalo, went down in hockey lore as "The Fog Game" due to an unusual May heatwave in Buffalo that forced parts of the game to be played in heavy fog, as Buffalo's arena lacked air conditioning. Though the Flyers lost both games in Buffalo, they won games five and six to win their second Stanley Cup. Parent also repeated as the playoffs MVP, winning a second consecutive Conn Smythe Trophy.

==== Victory against the Soviets and diminishing playoff success ====
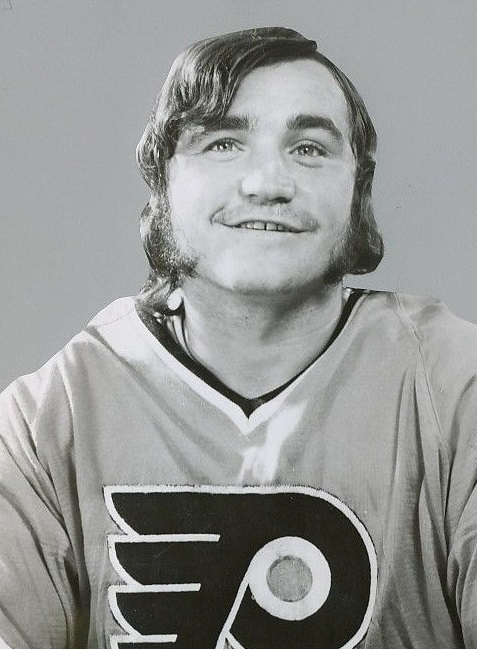
Rick MacLeish played for the Flyers from 1970 to 1981 and again in 1983.

On January 11, 1976 at the Spectrum, the Flyers, as part of the Super Series '76, played an exhibition game against the Soviet Union's Central Red Army team. As the Flyers had put intimidation to good use the past three years, the Flyers' rugged style of play led the Soviets to leave the ice midway through the first period, protesting a hit on Valeri Kharlamov by Ed Van Impe, whom Clarke also slashed on the ankle in the Summit Series '72. After some delay, the Soviets returned after they were warned that they would lose their salary for the entire series. The Flyers went on to win the game rather 4–1, and were the only team to defeat the Red Army in the series. After that win, the Spectrum became known as the "most intimidating building to play in and has the most intimidating fans." Head coach Fred Shero proclaimed, "Yes we are world champions. If they had won, they would have been world champions. We beat the hell out of a machine."

The Flyers recorded the best record in team history with a 51–13–16 record, while also setting the NHL record for most consecutive home wins in regulation (20). The LCB line, featuring Reggie Leach at right-wing, Bobby Clarke at center and Bill Barber at left-wing, set an NHL record for goals by a single line with 141 (Leach 61, Clarke 30, Barber 50). Clarke, on his way to a third Hart Trophy, set a club record for points in one season with 119. Heading into the playoffs, the Flyers defeated Toronto in seven games and defeated Boston in five games, with game five featuring a five-goal outburst by Leach to head to a third straight appearance in the Stanley Cup Final. However, the Flyers were swept in four games by Montreal. Despite the loss, Leach was awarded the Conn Smythe Trophy for scoring a record 19 goals in 16 playoff games.

Prior to the 1976–77 season, Dave Schultz was traded to the Los Angeles Kings. Despite a slight drop-off in performance, the Flyers won the Patrick Division with their fourth consecutive division title. In the playoffs, they lost in a four-game sweep against the Bruins in the semifinals. In the 1978 playoffs, they had a repeat of the prior season, losing to Boston in the semifinals. Following the season, Shero left to become general manager and head coach of the New York Rangers.

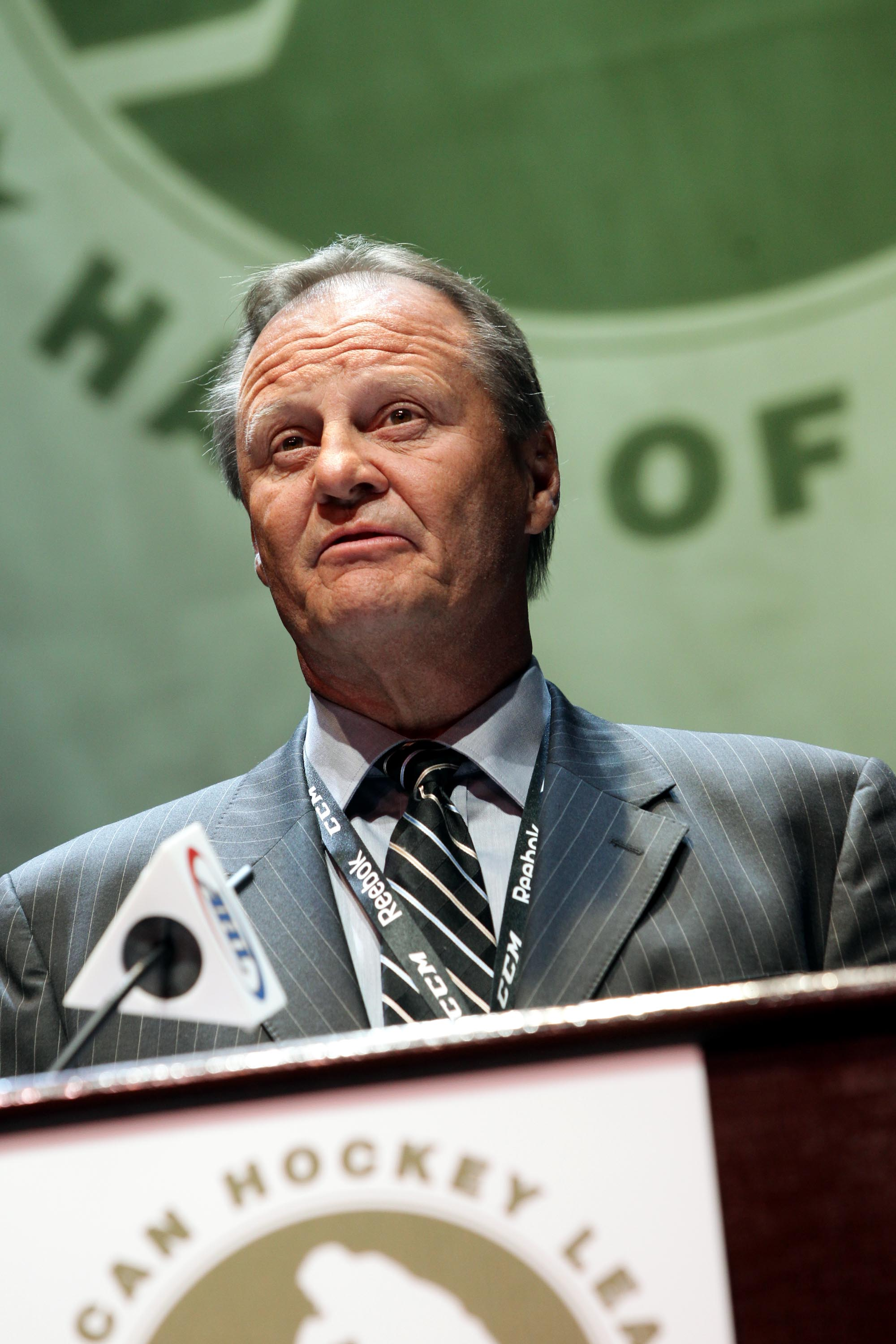
Bill Barber played for the Flyers from 1972 to 1984.

Bob McCammon replaced Fred Shero behind the bench. After a slow start in 1978–79, the Flyers switched McCammon with Pat Quinn, Shero's previous assistant coach. Bernie Parent also suffered a career-ending eye injury. The Flyers rallied under Quinn and finished in second place. Matched up against the Vancouver Canucks in the preliminary round, the Flyers won the series in three games. The Flyers' season came to an end against Fred Shero's Rangers in a five-game quarterfinals loss.

The Flyers began the 1979–80 season by naming Clarke a playing assistant coach and giving the captaincy to Mel Bridgman. While Clarke was against this initially, he accepted his new role. The Flyers went undefeated for a North American professional sports record 35-straight games (25–0–10), before losing 7–1 to the Minnesota North Stars, a record that still stands to this day. The streak started after the team was 1–1 on October 14, and ended on January 7, 1980. Their regular season success continued into the playoffs, as the Flyers swept the Edmonton Oilers in the first round, then went on to defeat the Rangers in five games before disposing of Minnesota in five games. Facing the Islanders in the 1980 Stanley Cup Final, the Flyers lost in six games on Bob Nystrom's overtime Stanley Cup-winning goal. The result of the series was marred by controversy, as the Islanders were offside on the play that resulted in their second goal, but the call was not made. Linesman Leon Stickle admitted after the game that he had blown the call. In the 1980–81 playoffs, after a five-game preliminary round series win against the Quebec Nordiques, they lost in the quarterfinals to the Calgary Flames in seven games.

=== New generation takes over (1981–1991) ===
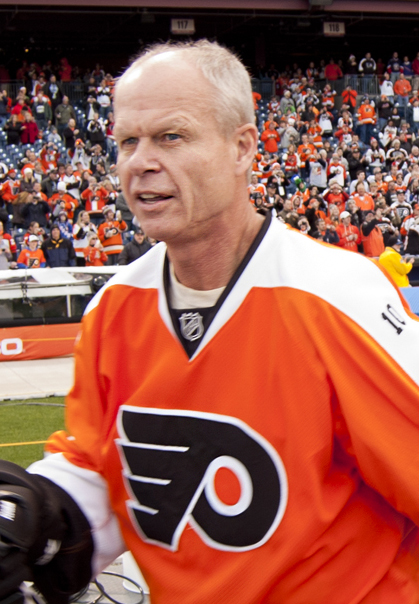
Mark Howe played for the Flyers from 1982 to 1992.

Over the next three seasons the team would suffer early playoff exits and manage to win only one playoff game during that span. They were eliminated two years in a row in 1981–82 and 1982–83 by the New York Rangers and then were swept by the Washington Capitals in 1983–84. Following the loss to Washington, Bobby Clarke retired and was named vice-president and general manager of the team. Mike Keenan was hired in 1984 to coach the team, and named Dave Poulin team captain.

Behind the goaltending of Pelle Lindbergh (who led the NHL with 40 wins and was the first European to win the Vezina Trophy), the Flyers won a franchise-record 53 games during the 1984–85 season. In the playoffs, the Flyers swept the Rangers in three games, defeated the Islanders in five and eliminated Quebec in six games to return to the Stanley Cup Final. However, they lost to the Edmonton Oilers in five games.

A month into the 1985–86 season, Lindbergh died in a car accident. The team rallied and showed perseverance by garnering the best record in the Wales Conference and matching their win total (53) from the previous year. Bob Froese substituted in net for Lindbergh, being named a second Team All-Star and sharing the William M. Jennings Trophy with teammate Darren Jensen. Despite their regular season success, the Flyers lost in the first round of the playoffs to the Rangers.

During the 1986–87 season, 22-year-old goaltender Ron Hextall made his debut. In his rookie season, he became the third Flyers goaltender to win the Vezina Trophy, joining Parent and Lindbergh. The Flyers captured a third straight Patrick Division title, and defeated the Ranger in six games in the division semifinals. They then defeated the Islanders in the division finals in seven games. In the conference finals, the Flyers eliminated the defending Stanley Cup champion Canadiens in a six-game series to win the Wales Conference and return to the Stanley Cup Final. Although the team rallied back from a 3–1 series deficit to force game seven, they lost in game seven However, they could not overcome the odds a third time and eventually succumbed to the Oilers, 3–1, in game seven. Hextall was voted playoffs MVP, the second time a Flyer won the Conn Smythe Trophy despite being on the losing team. (Note: Hextall is one of only four rookies and five players to win the Conn Smythe Trophy as a member of the losing team. The other four players are Roger Crozier (1966), Glenn Hall (1968), Reggie Leach (1976) and Jean-Sébastien Giguère (2003).)

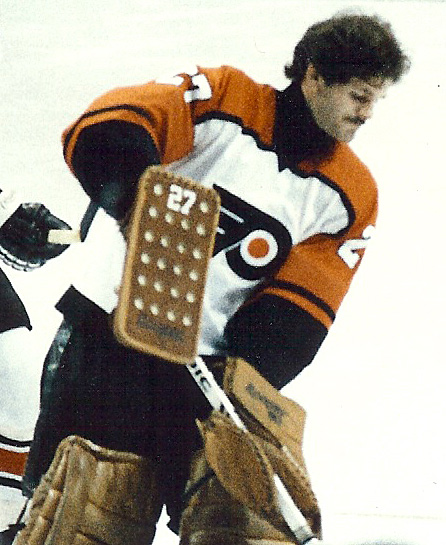
Ron Hextall played for the Flyers from 1986 to 1992, and again from 1994 to 1999.

In 1987–88, they finished third in the Patrick Division. On December 8, 1986, Hextall became the first NHL goaltender to score a goal by firing the puck into an empty net. In their first-round playoff series with Washington, the Flyers blew a 3–1 series lead as Washington forced a game seven. They then blew a 3–0 lead in game seven as Washington won in overtime 5–4. Mike Keenan was fired in the offseason. Paul Holmgren was named Keenan's replacement, the first time a former Flyer was named the club's head coach.

Despite finishing at the .500 mark in 1988–89, the Flyers made the playoffs for the 17th consecutive season. They defeated the Capitals in the first round in six games. Ron Hextall managed to score another empty-net goal in the waning moments of game five, becoming the first NHL goaltender to score a goal in the playoffs. The Flyers then defeated Pittsburgh in seven games to make the conference finals before losing to Montreal in six games.

The 1989–90 season got off to a bad start for the Flyers, and continued to get worse. Hextall missed all but eight games due to suspension for attacking Chris Chelios at the end of the Montreal playoff series the previous spring, contract holdout issues, and injury. Holmgren replaced Dave Poulin as captain in December with Ron Sutter, which led to Poulin's trade to Boston. As a result, the Flyers missed the playoffs for the first time since 1972. Bobby Clarke was fired and replaced as general manager by Russ Farwell.

Ron Hextall continued to be hampered by injuries during the 1990–91 season. He only played in 36 games and as a result the Flyers missed the playoffs for the second consecutive year, finishing fifth in the Division and three points short of a playoff spot after a late-season collapse.

=== Rebuilding years (1991–1994) ===
Prior to the 1991–92 season, the Flyers traded Ron Sutter to the Blues for Rod Brind'Amour. Paul Holmgren was fired midway through the season and was replaced by Bill Dineen, father of Flyer Kevin Dineen. On February 19, the Flyers and Pittsburgh made a major five-player deal to acquire Mark Recchi coming to Philadelphia.

In June 1992, the Flyers persuaded Bobby Clarke to return to the team as senior vice president after Ed Snider's son and president, Jay T. Snider won the hard-fought arbitration battle for 1991 first overall pick Eric Lindros against the Rangers. In order to acquire Lindros' rights, the Flyers parted with six players, trading Steve Duchesne, Peter Forsberg, Ron Hextall, Kerry Huffman, Mike Ricci, Chris Simon, a 1993 first-round draft pick, a 1994 first-round draft pick and $15 million to Quebec. Although Lindros became a preeminent star in Philadelphia, the trade proved heavily lopsided in favor of the Nordiques – soon to become the Colorado Avalanche – providing the core of their two Stanley Cup teams and an unprecedented eight-straight division championships, with Forsberg becoming a franchise player.

The trio of Lindros, Recchi and Brent Fedyk formed the Crazy Eights line in Lindros' first two years in the NHL; the eights being the player's jersey numbers (88, 8 and 18 respectively). In 1992–93, Recchi set the franchise record for points in a season with 123 (53 goals and 70 assists) and Lindros scored 41 goals in 61 games. After struggling early, the Flyers made a run at the playoffs, but came four points short of the last spot. Head coach Bill Dineen was fired at the season's end, while Clarke resigned to become general manager of the expansion Florida Panthers. For 1993–94, Terry Simpson was hired as the new head coach, though the team did not make the playoffs. Jay Snider stepped down as president, forcing his father Ed Snider to take over day-to-day operations.

=== Return to contention (1994–2004) ===
Clarke returned to the general manager position prior to the lockout-shortened 1994–95 season. They also traded Recchi to Montreal for Éric Desjardins, Gilbert Dionne and John LeClair. The Flyers initially struggled out of the gate, going only 3–7–1 through their first 11 games. Lindros and LeClair then teamed with Renberg to form the Legion of Doom line, a mix of scoring talent and physical intimidation. In their 37 games, the Flyers went 25–9–3. Lindros tied Jaromír Jágr for the regular season scoring lead and captured the Hart Memorial Trophy as the league's MVP. The playoff drought came to an end as the Flyers won their first division title in eight years and clinched the second seed in the Eastern Conference. After dispatching Buffalo in five and sweeping the defending Stanley Cup champion Rangers, the Flyers were upset in the conference finals to the eventual Stanley Cup champion New Jersey Devils in six games.

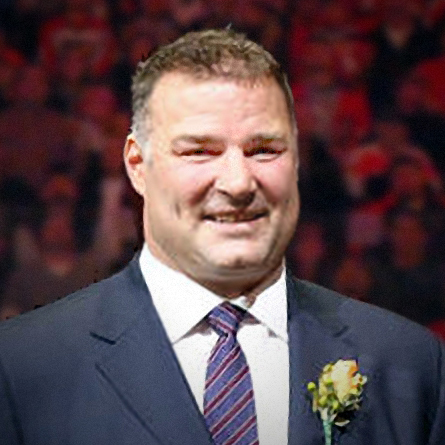
Eric Lindros played for the Flyers from 1992 to 2000.

Lindros eclipsed the 100-point mark for the first time in 1995–96, gathering 115 points, as the Flyers repeated as Atlantic Division champs and clinched the top seed in the East. After defeating the Tampa Bay Lightning in six games, they lost against the Florida Panthers in six games.

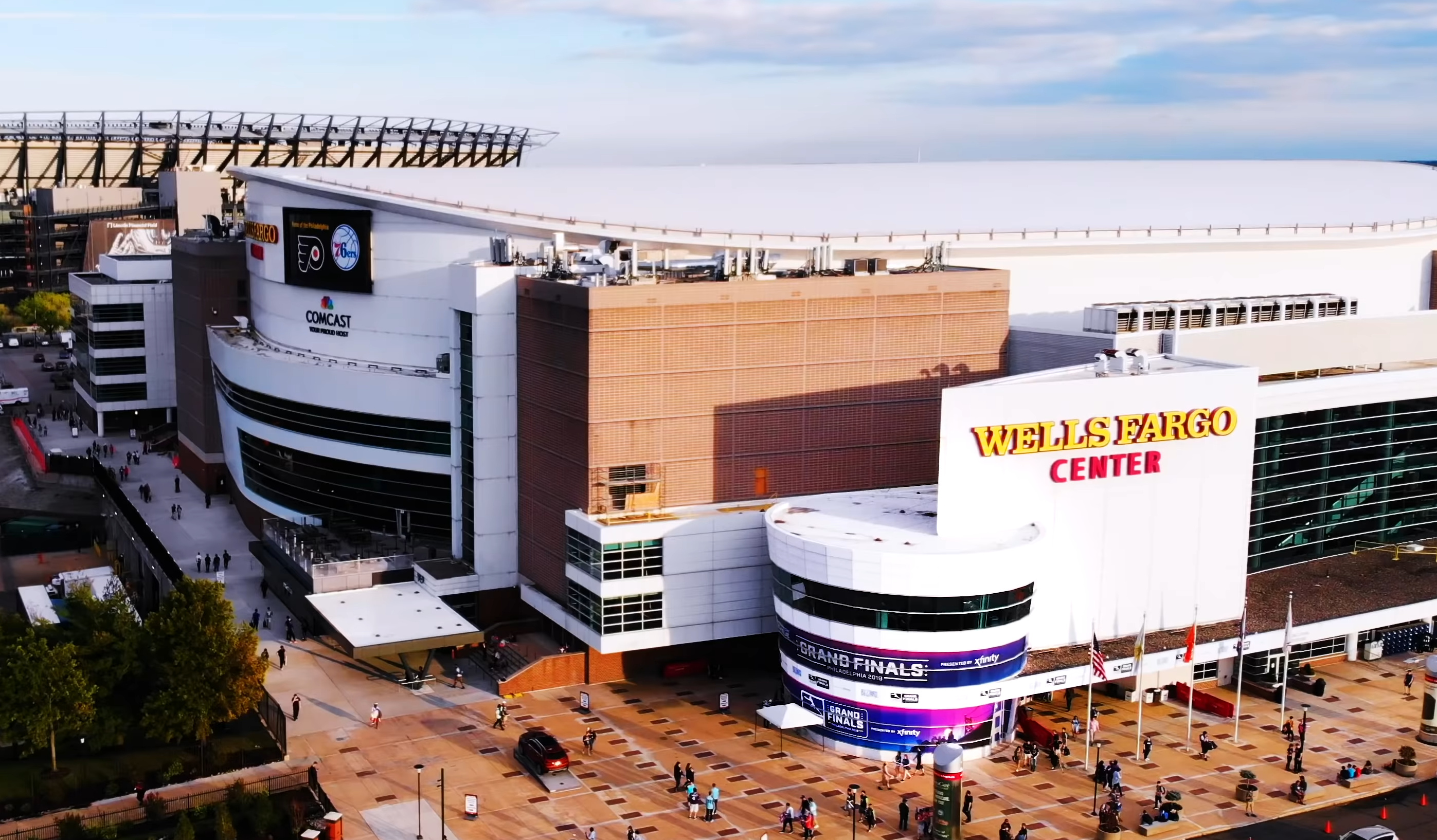
In 1996, the Flyers moved to their present home arena, the CoreStates Center (now Xfinity Mobile Arena).

The Flyers moved to the CoreStates Center – for the next season. The 1996–97 season started off slowly, as Lindros missed 30 games wiith an injury while the mid-season acquisition of defenseman Paul Coffey. Despite finishing just one point shy of a third straight Atlantic Division title, the Flyers clinched a berth in the Stanley Cup Final for the first time since 1987.The Flyers were swept in four-straight games by the Detroit Red Wings. In July, Mikael Renberg was traded to the Tampa Bay Lightning, in exchange for Chris Gratton, thus splitting up the Legion of Doom line.

Murray was fired prior to the 1997–98 season and replaced by Wayne Cashman. However, the team struggled throughout the season, and with 21 games to go in the season, Roger Neilson took over as coach while Cashman was retained as an assistant. John LeClair was able to score at least 50 goals for the third consecutive year (netting 51), the first time for an American-born player. The Flyers were defeated in the conference quarterfinals by the Sabres.

In the offseason, signed goaltender John Vanbiesbrouck as a free agent. The 1998–99 season was marred by a life-threatening injury sustained by Eric Lindros during a game against the Nashville Predators, a season-ending injury later diagnosed as a collapsed lung. The Flyers re-acquired Mark Recchi at the trade deadline. However, they lost their first-round series with Toronto in six games.

The 1999–2000 offseason contained heartbreak as longtime broadcaster Gene Hart died due to illness and defenseman Dmitri Tertyshny, coming off his rookie season, was fatally injured in a freak boating accident. During the season, head coach Roger Neilson was diagnosed with bone cancer, forcing him to step aside in February, 2000 to undergo treatment, so assistant coach Craig Ramsay took over as interim coach for the rest of the season. In January, Rod Brind'Amour was traded to the Carolina Hurricanes in exchange for Keith Primeau. Meanwhile, the strife between Flyers management (particularly Clarke) and Lindros, continued to worsen. Less than a month after Ramsay took over, Lindros suffered his second concussion of the season. He played several games after the initial hit and afterwards criticized the team's training staff for failing to initially diagnose the concussion after it happened. It was after this that the Flyers' organization decided to strip Lindros of the captaincy on March 27 and name defenseman Éric Desjardins the team's captain. With Lindros out indefinitely, the Flyers rallied to overcome a 15-point deficit in the standings to win the Atlantic Division and the top seed in the East on the last day of the regular season. They defeated their first-round opponent, Buffalo, in five games. In the second round against their rival, the Penguins, Keith Primeau scored in the fifth overtime of game four. The Flyers won the series in six games. In game six of the conference finals, Lindros returned to the lineup for the first time since March. Early in game seven, Lindros was handed another concussion after being hit by New Jersey Devils forward Scott Stevens. They lost the game, ending their season. Lindros never again wore a Flyers uniform, as he sat out the following season awaiting a trade.

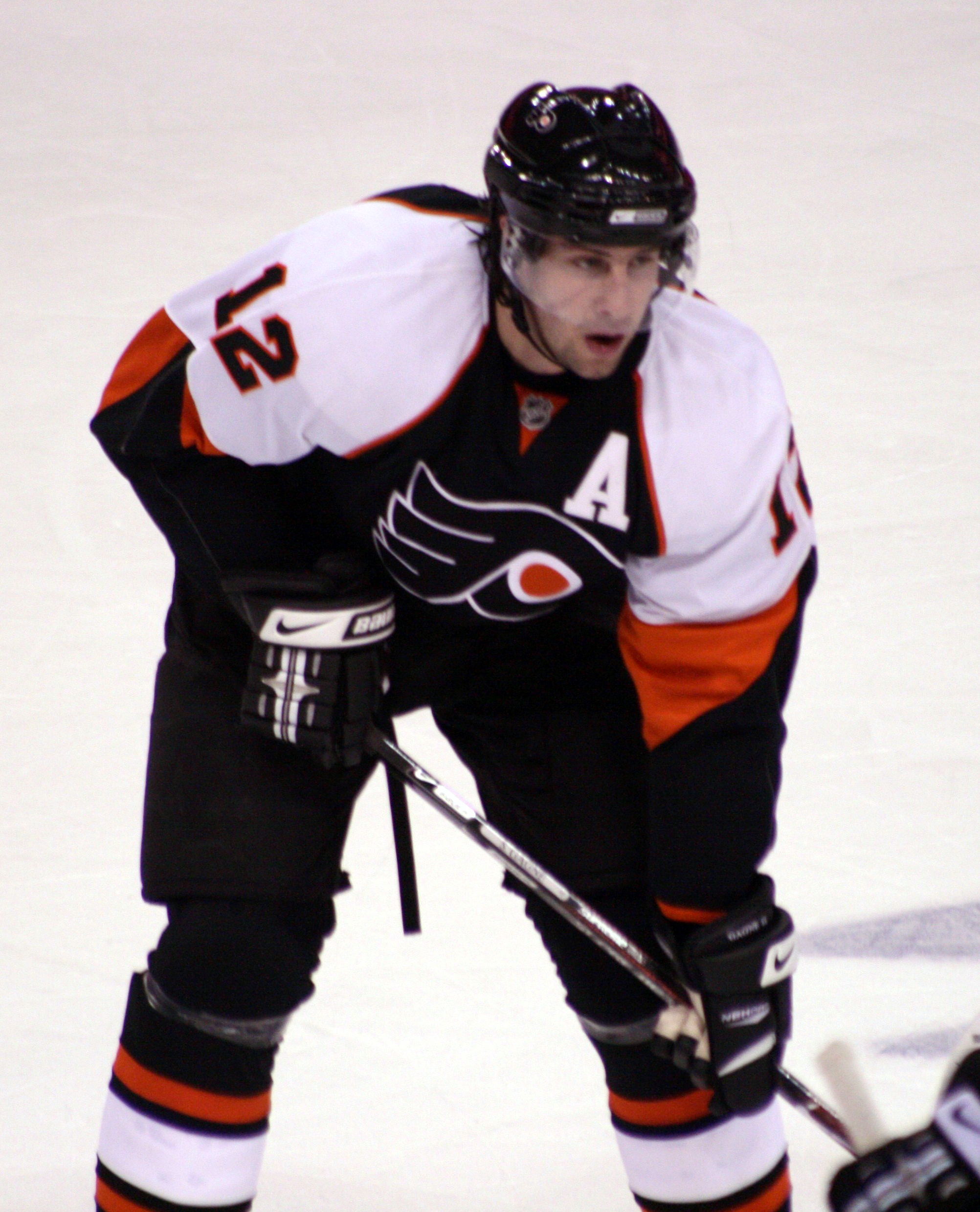
Simon Gagné played for the Flyers from 1999 to 2010, and in 2012–13.

Craig Ramsay was named the head coach as Neilson was not asked to return for the 2000–01, which became a matter of some controversy. Ramsay lasted only until December when he was replaced by former Flyer Bill Barber. However, the coaching changes did not change the outcome in the playoffs, as they lost in the first round against Buffalo in six games.

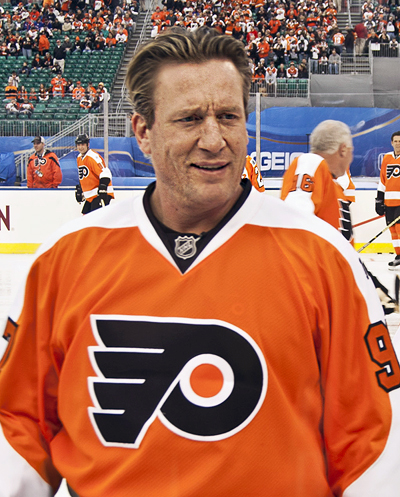
Jeremy Roenick played for the Flyers from 2001 to 2004.

In the 2001–02 offseason, the Flyers signed Jeremy Roenick and traded Eric Lindros to the Rangers for Kim Johnsson, Jan Hlaváč, Pavel Brendl and a 2003 third-round draft pick. Desjardins stepped down as team captain eight games into the season and was replaced by Primeau. Adam Oates was acquired from Washington at the NHL trade deadline. The Flyers could not muster much offense, scoring only two goals in their five-game, first-round playoff loss to the Ottawa Senators. It turned out there was much discontent in the locker room as Bill Barber was fired. The Flyers Stanley Cup-winning head coach Ken Hitchcock after the season ended. In the 2003 playoffs, the Flyers defeated the Maple Leafs in seven games. The Flyers fought Ottawa in the second round, but lost in six games.

On March 5, 2004, during the 2003–04 season, the Flyers set an NHL record in a game against Ottawa where they set a combined record of 419 penalty minutes in a single game. In the playoffs, the Flyers defeated the defending Stanley Cup champion Devils in five games, followed by defeating Toronto in six games en route to the conference finals. However, they lost to the Tampa Bay Lightning in seven games.

=== From highs to lows (2004–2014) ===
With the NHL preparing for looming labor unrest, the Flyers let their leading scorer, Mark Recchi, leave for Pittsburgh during the off-season. Unsure about the future, the Flyers were unsure about his worth. The NHL lockout forced the cancellation of the 2004–05 NHL season. The Flyers were one of the more active teams once the NHL lockout came to an end. Replacing the high-profile names of Amonte, LeClair and Roenick were superstar Peter Forsberg, along with defensemen Derian Hatcher and Mike Rathje, as well as several players from the Calder Cup-winning Philadelphia Phantoms. When all was said and done, the team had experienced a turnover of nearly two-thirds of the roster.

The Flyers began the 2005–06 NHL season with lofty expectations. Despite being hampered by injuries prior to and during the season, the Flyers lived up to those expectations in the first half of the season, reaching the top of the league standings in January while simultaneously holding a 10-point lead in the Atlantic Division. The Deuces Wild line of Forsberg, Gagne, and Mike Knuble recorded 75, 79 and 65 points respectively while Gagne, with Forsberg feeding him, scored a career-high of 47 goals. However, the injuries began to accumulate and take their toll, the most crippling of which was Keith Primeau's season-ending concussion. Derian Hatcher served as interim captain for the remainder of the season. The Flyers had been first in the league prior to the Olympic break, where an injury to Forsberg occurred. All told, the Flyers were third in the NHL with 388 man-games lost to injury, tops amongst playoff teams. The second half of the regular season was defined by a record hovering around .500, sending the Flyers on a steady slide in the standings. The Flyers fell short of an Atlantic Division title, finishing second by tie-breaker to New Jersey, drawing the fifth seed in the Eastern Conference and a first-round matchup with fourth-seeded Buffalo. The Flyers lost the series in six games.

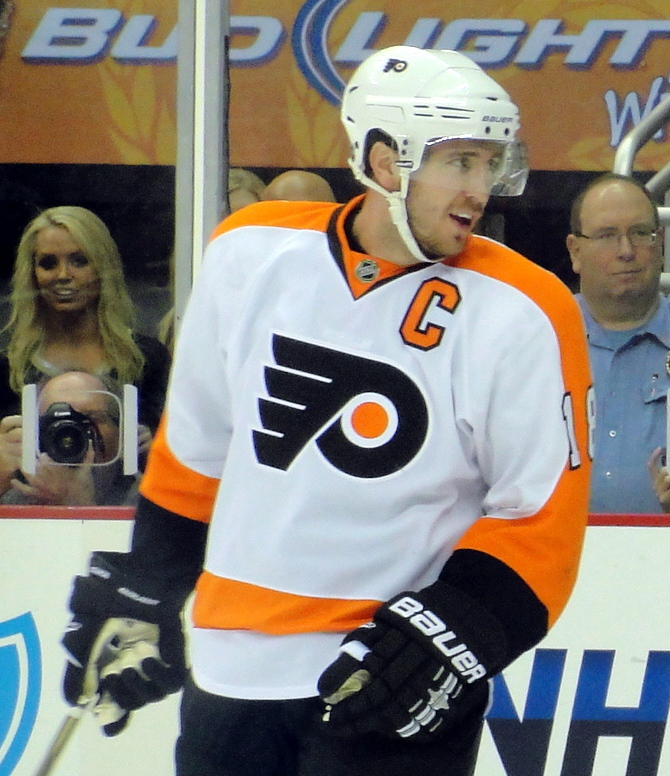
Mike Richards played for the Flyers from 2005 to 2011.

The Flyers' 40th anniversary season turned out to be the worst in franchise history. The Flyers traded Michal Handzuš to Chicago, lost Kim Johnsson to free agency and Éric Desjardins and team captain Keith Primeau retired in the off-season. Peter Forsberg replaced Primeau as team captain, but a chronic foot injury developing in last season's Olympics had him in and out of the lineup throughout the season and limited his effectiveness. Eight games into the regular season and with a record of 1–6–1, general manager Bobby Clarke resigned and head coach Ken Hitchcock was fired. Assistant coach John Stevens replaced Hitchcock and assistant general manager Paul Holmgren took on Clarke's responsibilities on an interim basis.

The changes did little to improve the Flyers fortunes in 2006–07 as setting franchise records for futility became the norm. They had several multiple-game losing streaks, including a franchise-worst 10-game losing streak and a 13-game home losing streak that stretched from November 29 to February 10. Ultimately, the Flyers finished with a 22–48–12 record, the most losses and the worst winning percentage in franchise history, and the worst record in the league. They also set the NHL record for the biggest points drop off in the standings in a one-year span (101 points in 2005–06 to 56 points in 2006–07, a difference of 45 points). The Flyers lost the 2007 NHL draft lottery to the Chicago Blackhawks and received the second overall selection.

With the team clearly on the verge of missing the playoffs for the first time in 13 years, Paul Holmgren set his sights on rebuilding the team and preparing for the future. Forsberg, unwilling to commit to playing next season, was traded to Nashville for Scottie Upshall, Ryan Parent and 2007 first- and third-round draft picks at the deadline. Veteran defenseman Alexei Zhitnik was traded to the Atlanta Thrashers for prospect defenseman Braydon Coburn, while disappointing off-season acquisition Kyle Calder was sent to Detroit via Chicago in exchange for defenseman Lasse Kukkonen. The Flyers also acquired goaltender Martin Biron from Buffalo for a 2007 second-round pick. Given wide praise for his efforts, the Flyers gave Holmgren a two-year contract and removed the interim label from his title.

Before the 2007–08 season began the Flyers made a trade that sent the first-round draft pick they had acquired in the Forsberg trade (23rd overall) back to Nashville in exchange for the rights to negotiate with impending unrestricted free agents Kimmo Timonen and Scott Hartnell. Both were subsequently signed to six-year contracts. After much speculation about whether the Flyers would keep or trade the second overall pick in the 2007 NHL entry draft, the Flyers opted to keep it, using it to select New Jersey native James van Riemsdyk.

The Flyers wasted no time in addressing their free-agent needs. On July 1, the Flyers signed Buffalo co-captain Daniel Brière to an eight-year, $52 million contract. Continuing to revamp their defensive core, Joni Pitkänen and Geoff Sanderson were traded to Edmonton in exchange for Oilers captain Jason Smith and Joffrey Lupul. Smith was later named Flyers captain on October 1.

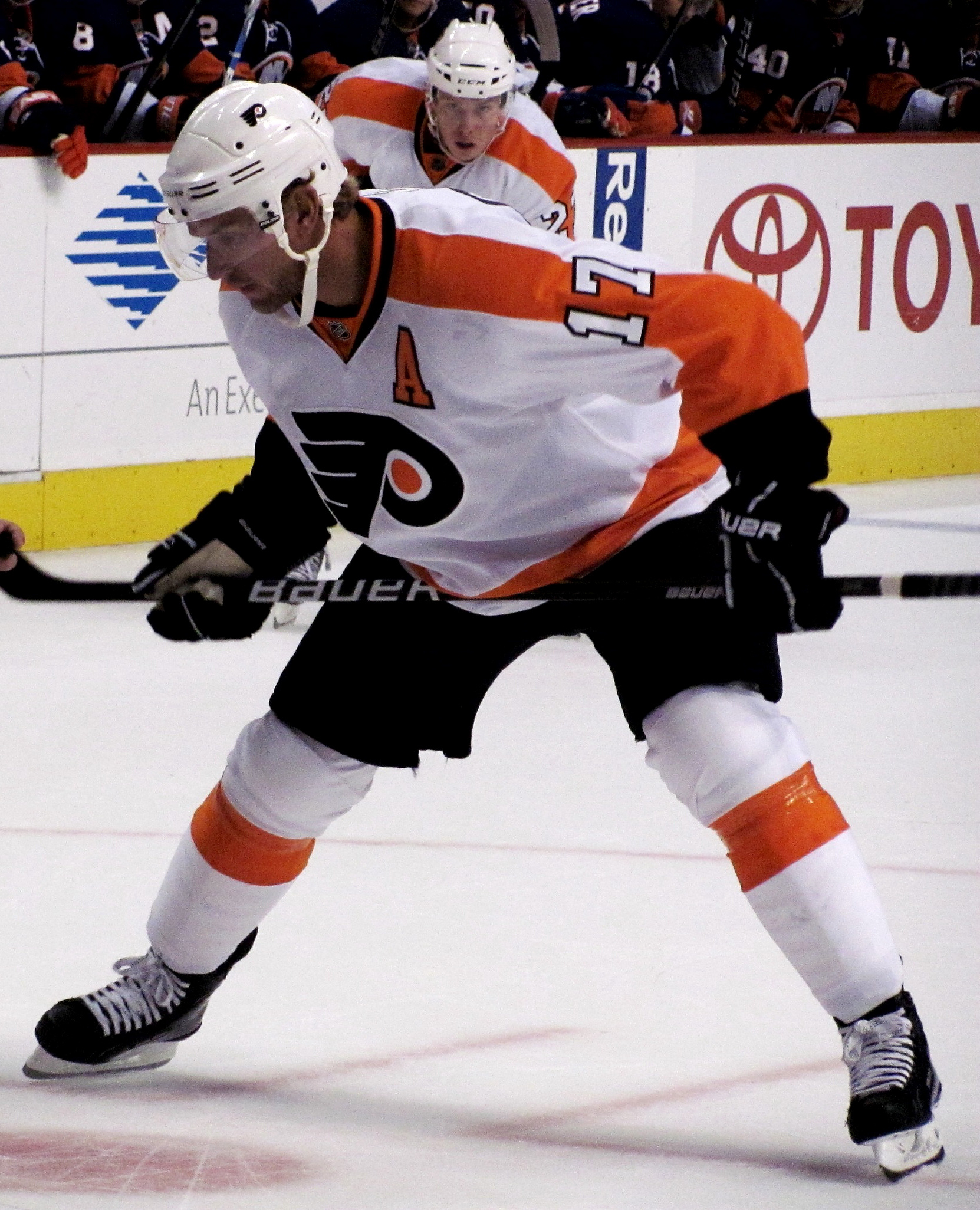
Jeff Carter played for the Flyers from 2005 to 2011.

The season began in the image of the Broad Street Bullies era, with multiple-game suspensions handed out to five separate players, the most serious being 25-game suspensions to both Steve Downie and Jesse Boulerice for two separate incidents. A 7–3 start in October and a 9–3–1 January run had the Flyers near the top of both the Division and Conference standings. However, a disastrous ten-game losing streak in February, reminiscent of such a streak the previous season, nearly derailed the Flyers' year. An 8–3–4 run in March, coupled with two huge wins over New Jersey and Pittsburgh over the final weekend of the regular season, put the Flyers back in the 2008 playoffs as the sixth seed, setting up a first-round matchup with Washington. After taking a three-game-to-one lead over the Capitals, Washington then won games 5 and 6 to force a deciding game seven in Washington. After an evenly fought game, the Flyers ultimately won the series in overtime via a Joffrey Lupul powerplay goal. The Flyers then drew a matchup with heavily favored Montreal in the second round. Despite being outshot a majority of the series, the Flyers upset the Canadiens in five games, advancing to the conference finals for the first time since 2003–04 to face Pittsburgh. Before the start of the series, the Flyers suffered a fatal blow when it was learned that Kimmo Timonen was out with a blood clot in his ankle. Coupled with a gruesome facial injury to Braydon Coburn in game two, Pittsburgh ran roughshod over the Flyers' depleted defense and jumped out to a 3–0 series lead. The Flyers won game four at home to stave off elimination, and although Timonen returned for game five, Pittsburgh finished off the Flyers in five games.

The Flyers began the 2008–09 season by naming Mike Richards the 17th captain in team history on September 17, with Jason Smith having departed to Ottawa as a free agent. The Flyers were looking to build on the success of the previous season, but instead got off to an 0–3–3 start. However, despite a solid December and January and finishing with four points more than the year before, for the most part, the 2008–09 Flyers played inconsistently and looked like different teams, playing at the top of their ability one night and a sub-par performance the next. Derian Hatcher missed the entire regular season and playoffs with a knee injury, and Steve Downie was traded to Tampa Bay with Steve Eminger, whom they had previously acquired in a trade with Washington prior to the season for defenseman Matt Carle. Two pleasant surprises were the emergence of rookie center Claude Giroux and defenseman Luca Sbisa, who was drafted by the Flyers in June with the 19th overall pick acquired from the Columbus Blue Jackets in exchange for R. J. Umberger, a victim of team salary cap constraints. Scottie Upshall also found himself the victim of such a crunch; he was traded to Phoenix in exchange for Daniel Carcillo at the NHL trade deadline.

Despite holding on to the fourth seed in the East for much of the season, thanks to a 4–5–1 finish to the season, highlighted by a home loss to the Rangers on the last day of the regular season, the Flyers slipped to the fifth seed and lost home-ice advantage in their first-round series with Pittsburgh. Pittsburgh dominated the Flyers in game one, and despite a better effort by the Flyers in game two, Pittsburgh came to Philadelphia with a 2–0 series lead. The Flyers were the better team in games three and four, but Pittsburgh gained a split in Philadelphia and took a 3–1 series lead. After a decisive 3–0 win in game five, the Flyers jumped out to a 3–0 lead in game six, but promptly fell victim to the inconsistencies that plagued the team all season and gave up five unanswered goals in a season-ending 5–3 loss. Giroux led the team in scoring in the playoffs. Jeff Carter ended the regular season with 46 goals, second in the NHL after Washington's Alexander Ovechkin. Mike Richards just missed out on the Frank J. Selke Trophy in the closest vote in the history of the award.

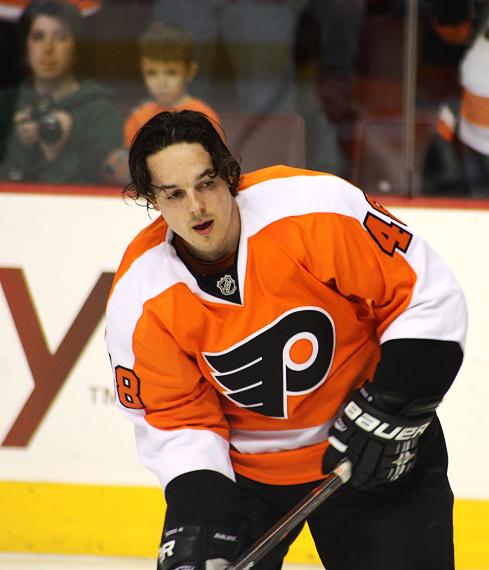
Daniel Brière played for the Flyers from 2007 to 2013.

The Flyers began the 2009–10 season with some major changes, allowing goaltenders Martin Biron and Antero Niittymaki to depart via free agency, replacing them with former Ottawa netminder Ray Emery and former Flyer Brian Boucher, and significantly upgrading the defense with the addition of Chris Pronger from Anaheim. Pronger came at a price, however, costing the Flyers Joffrey Lupul, Luca Sbisa and the Flyers' first-round draft picks in both 2009 and 2010 drafts. The season began in earnest, though it soon unraveled with mediocre play that cost head coach John Stevens his job in December 2009. Peter Laviolette was hired as his replacement in order to reinstitute accountability and restore success to the Flyers, though the results were not immediate; the Flyers suffered a 2–7–1 stretch immediately following his arrival. Injuries took a major toll on the Flyers, with Blair Betts, Daniel Brière, Jeff Carter, Simon Gagné and Kimmo Timonen all missing significant numbers of games, though no position was nearly affected as much with injuries as goaltending. Emery suffered a hip injury in December, played sporadically afterwards and ultimately underwent season-ending surgery. Boucher suffered a hand injury shortly thereafter, which allowed journeyman goaltender Michael Leighton to step in and make an immediate impact. Leighton went 8–0–1 in his first ten starts, including a tough 2–1 overtime loss in the 2010 Winter Classic to Boston at Fenway Park on New Year's Day. However, Leighton was forced out of the line-up in March with a high ankle sprain, necessitating Boucher's return as starter. All told, seven different goaltenders suited up for the Flyers at various points throughout the year. Mediocre play down the stretch forced the Flyers into a do-or-die shootout with the Rangers in the final game of the regular season. Boucher stopped final shooter Olli Jokinen to clinch the seventh seed in the Eastern Conference and a first-round matchup with New Jersey.

Boucher and the Flyers consistently outplayed Martin Brodeur and New Jersey and pulled off the upset in five games. However, the victory was costly, as Carter suffered a broken foot and Gagne a broken toe in game four, while Ian Laperrière suffered a grievous facial injury by blocking a shot in game five. The Flyers then faced sixth-seeded Boston in the second round, and despite playing at an even level with the Bruins, the Flyers found themselves in a 3–0 series deficit. Gagne returned in game four and scored in overtime to force a game five, which the Flyers won convincingly, 4–0. Boucher suffered MCL sprains during the game in both knees which forced Leighton back into net in his first time suiting up since March. Boucher and Leighton became the first goaltenders since 1955 to share a playoff shutout. A 2–1 Flyers win in game six forced a game seven in Boston. Falling behind 3–0 in game seven, the Flyers pulled off the biggest comeback in both franchise and League history, winning 4–3 on a late goal by Gagne to join the 1941–42 Toronto Maple Leafs, the 1974–75 New York Islanders and the 2004 Boston Red Sox as the only sports teams to win a playoff series after trailing 3–0.

In the conference finals, the Flyers had home-ice advantage as they faced eighth-seeded Montreal. Leighton became the first Flyers netminder to record three shutouts in a series, and Carter and Laperriere returned to the lineup as the Flyers won the Eastern Conference Championship in five games, advancing to the Stanley Cup Final for the first time since 1997 to face the Chicago Blackhawks. Dropping two close games in Chicago, the Flyers returned home to win game three in overtime and game four to even the series. A convincing 7–4 win by Chicago in game five, however, put the Flyers one game away from elimination. A late goal by Scott Hartnell in game six forced overtime, but Patrick Kane scored just over four minutes into overtime to eliminate the Flyers and give Chicago their first Stanley Cup since 1961. Ville Leino, acquired in a mid-season trade from Detroit, set the Flyers rookie playoff scoring record and tied the NHL record with 21 points. Briere led the NHL playoff scoring race with 30 points, one point ahead of Conn Smythe Trophy winner, Jonathan Toews.

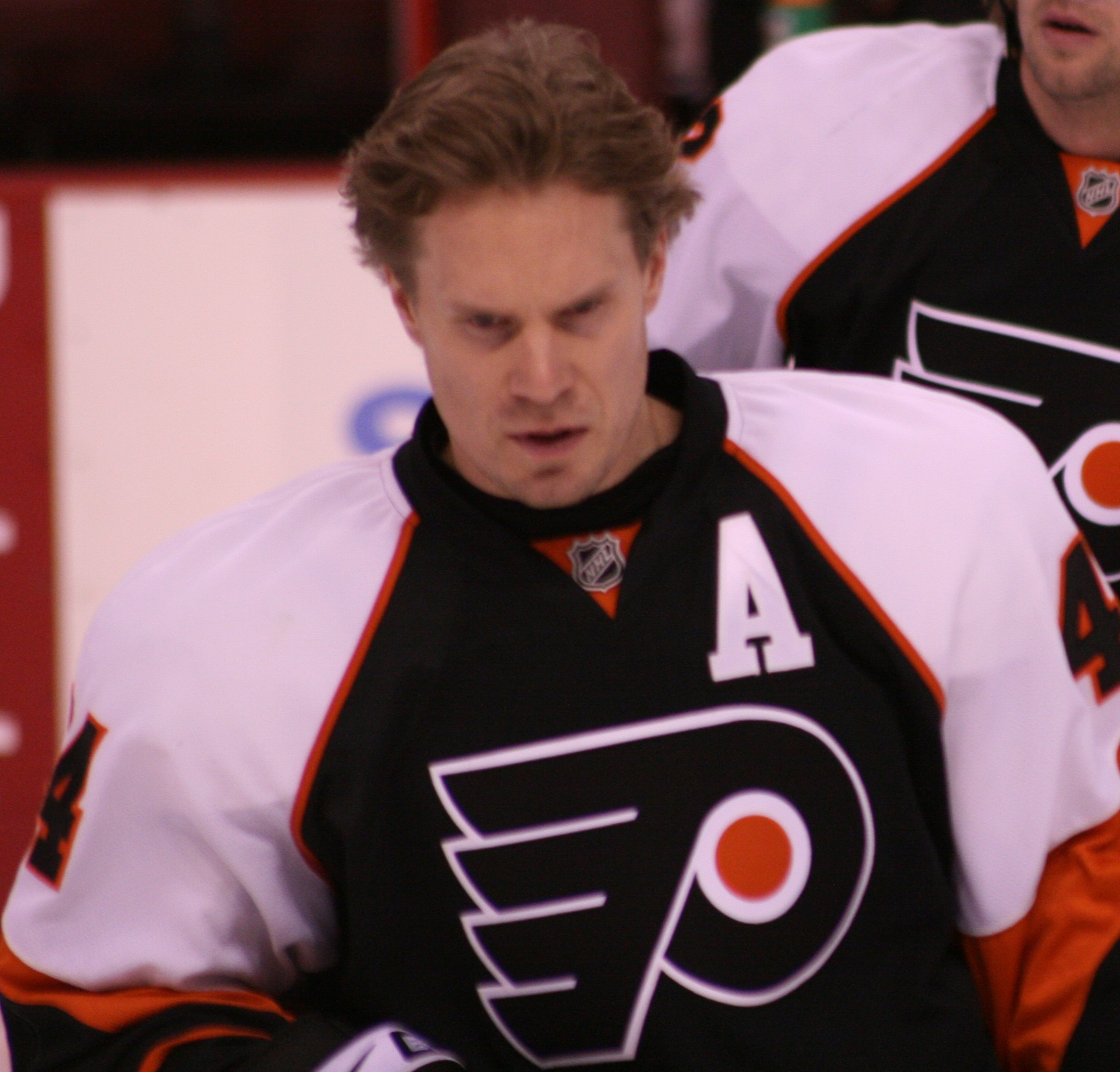
Kimmo Timonen played for the Flyers from 2007 to 2014.

Coming off the close loss to Chicago in the Cup Final, the Flyers traded Gagne to Tampa Bay to clear up cap space, acquired Andrej Meszároš from Tampa Bay in a separate trade and signed free agent Sean O'Donnell to shore up the defensive corps. The Flyers started the 2010–11 season with rookie goaltender Sergei Bobrovsky from the Kontinental Hockey League (KHL) in Russia, who recorded an opening-night win in his NHL debut against Pittsburgh and had steady numbers throughout the season. Boucher remained as the team's backup goaltender, while Leighton played one game in December after recovering from a back injury before being demoted to Adirondack in the American Hockey League (AHL). The Flyers led both the Atlantic Division and Eastern Conference for the majority of the season, and challenged Vancouver for the overall NHL lead. Kris Versteeg was brought in from Toronto to add additional offense for the stretch drive and playoffs. However, lackluster play throughout March and April, coupled with a broken hand suffered by Chris Pronger in late February that ended his regular season, cost the Flyers the top seed in the East during the last week of the regular season, although the Flyers hung on to win their first Atlantic Division title since 2003–04 and clinched the second seed in the Eastern Conference.

The Flyers drew Buffalo in the first round. Bobrovsky played well in a 1–0 game one loss, but was replaced in game two by Boucher, who held on for a 5–4 Flyers win. Boucher played well in a game three win and a game four loss, but was replaced himself in a favor of Leighton during a bad first period in game five, which Buffalo won in overtime. Pronger returned to the lineup and Leighton started game six, but was replaced by Boucher after a poor first period, though nonetheless the Flyers went on to win in overtime and forced a game seven, which Boucher started. The Flyers dominated Buffalo, 5–2, and became the first team to win a playoff series starting three different goaltenders since 1988. The Flyers then drew a rematch with the Boston Bruins in the second round. Boston dominated the Flyers in game one, where Boucher was again replaced, this time by Bobrovsky. Pronger again left the lineup with an undisclosed injury, while Boston won game two in overtime and again dominated the Flyers in game three to take a 3–0 series lead. Bobrovsky started game four, but there was no comeback like in their previous meeting, as Boston completed the sweep. The Flyers tied an NHL record with seven playoff in-game goaltender changes, and were the only NHL team not to record a shutout in either the regular season or playoffs.

Flyers general manager Paul Holmgren made two franchise-altering trades within the span of an hour on June 23, 2011, trading Mike Richards to the Los Angeles Kings for Brayden Schenn, Wayne Simmonds and a 2012 second-round draft pick, and Jeff Carter to Columbus for their 2011 first-round pick (with which the Flyers selected Sean Couturier), 2011 third-round pick (with which the Flyers selected Nick Cousins) and Jakub Voráček. Later that same day, Holmgren addressed the Flyers' long-standing goaltending issues by signing the Phoenix Coyotes' Ilya Bryzgalov to a nine-year, $51 million contract. On July 1, the Flyers signed Jaromír Jágr to a one-year contract, Maxime Talbot to a five-year contract and Andreas Lilja to a two-year contract. Additionally, Chris Pronger was named Flyers captain; however, 13 games into the 2011–12 season, he was lost for the remainder of the regular season and playoffs with severe post-concussion syndrome. Bryzgalov's play ranged from spectacular to sub-par, including being benched in favor of Sergei Bobrovsky for the Flyers' 3–2 loss to the New York Rangers in the 2012 Winter Classic, but also being named NHL First Star for the month of March. Twelve rookies suited up for the Flyers during the season, with the play of Couturier, Schenn and Matt Read standing out impressively.

The Flyers drew Pittsburgh in the first round of the 2012 playoffs, a series in which the two teams combined for an NHL-record 45 goals in the first four games and a total of 309 penalty minutes in an intense, fight-filled series. The Flyers pulled off the upset in six games against a heavily favored Pittsburgh team. In the second round against New Jersey, the Flyers were heavily favored to win the series, but the Flyers' run-and-gun style of play was stymied by the Devils' forechecking and defense, and, although they won the first game at home in overtime, the Flyers lost four games in a row and were eliminated in five. Briere and Giroux ended the playoffs tied with five other players for the League lead in playoff goals with eight, despite their team being eliminated in the second round.

The team began the lockout-shortened 2012–13 season by naming Claude Giroux captain on January 15, 2013, and starting off at 0–3–0, their worst start in 17 years. The franchise finished at a record of 23–22–3, fourth in the Atlantic and tenth in the East. The team failed to qualify for the playoffs for the first time since the 2006–07 season and only the ninth time in team history. During the off-season, the Flyers used their two contract buyouts allotted by the new league collective bargaining agreement on Bryzgalov and Briere, and signed free agents Mark Streit (four years, $21 million) and Vincent Lecavalier (five years, $22.5 million).

On October 7, head coach Peter Laviolette and assistant coach Kevin McCarthy were both fired just three games into the 2013–14 season after the team again began the season 0–3–0. Assistant coach Craig Berube, who previously played for the Flyers and served two stints as head coach of the Flyers' AHL affiliate, the Philadelphia Phantoms, was named the new head coach, while John Paddock and former Flyer Ian Laperrière were announced as Berube's assistants. The team went 42–27–10 with Berube behind the bench, clinching a playoff berth and ultimately losing in seven games to the New York Rangers in the first round of the 2014 playoffs.

=== Multiple makeovers (2014–2023) ===
On May 7, 2014, the club announced that general manager Paul Holmgren had been promoted to president, with assistant general manager Ron Hextall filling his vacancy. Hextall laid out a new plan for the franchise to develop players from within their system, rather than through outside acquisitions. In order to free up valuable cap space, Scott Hartnell was traded before the start of the 2014–15 season, following Braydon Coburn and Kimmo Timonen being traded away mid-season.

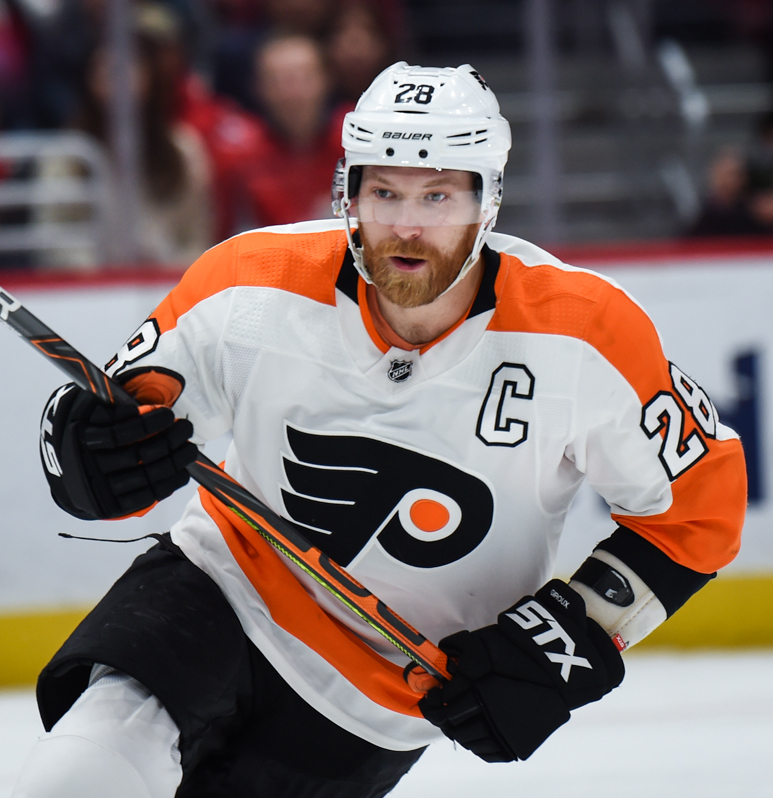
Claude Giroux played for the Flyers from 2007 to 2022, serving as team captain for 10 seasons.

The Flyers did not qualify for the playoffs for the second time in three seasons in 2014–15, and head coach Berube was subsequently fired after the season. The Flyers finished with 33 wins and 31 losses for 84 points. On May 18, 2015, the Flyers hired the former head coach of the University of North Dakota men's team, Dave Hakstol. Hakstol had been North Dakota's coach for the past eight seasons, during which he accumulated a 289–143–43 record and led the school to the NCAA tournament in each season at the helm. In the 2014–15 NCAA season, the university went 29–10–3 and advanced to the Frozen Four for the seventh time during Hakstol's tenure.

The Flyers began the 2015–16 season with a record of 4–2–1 in their first seven games. They found themselves outside of the playoff picture near the halfway point of the regular season, but a second-half surge, including a combined record of 17–7–5 in February and March, placed them into playoff position. On the second-to-last day of the season, the Flyers clinched the final wild-card playoff berth with a win over Pittsburgh and an Ottawa win over Boston, which consequently eliminated the Bruins from playoff contention. The Flyers faced Washington in the first round, losing the first three games of the series. The Flyers would rally to win the next two games, but lost the series in six games.

On April 11, 2016, Flyers longtime chairman, co-founder, and former majority owner Ed Snider died after a two-year battle with bladder cancer. In the 2016–17 season, the Flyers won ten straight games during the months of November and December. However, they fell out of the playoff picture after that streak ended, struggling in the standings and letting other teams get ahead of them. They were eliminated from playoff contention during the last two weeks of the regular season, becoming the first team to miss the playoffs after having a winning streak of ten or more games in the process.

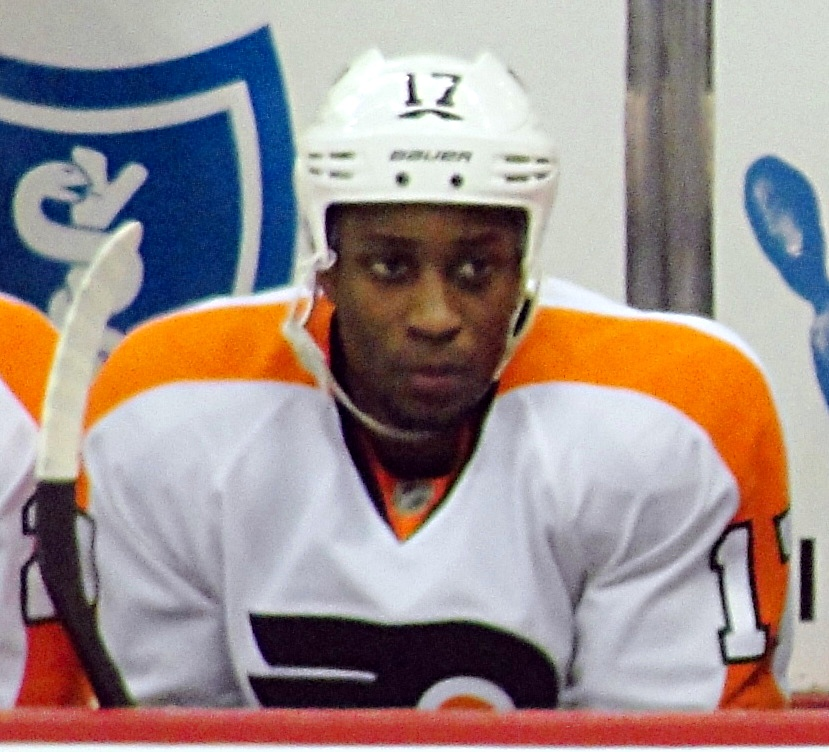
Wayne Simmonds played for the Flyers from 2011 to 2019.

Despite finishing sixth in their division, they won the second overall pick in the 2017 NHL entry draft lottery with just a 2.4% chance to win that particular pick. They used this pick to select Nolan Patrick from the Brandon Wheat Kings. In the 2017–18 season, the Flyers rallied from a 10-game losing streak early in the season to finish in third place in the Metropolitan Division but lost to Pittsburgh in six games in the first round of the 2018 playoffs. They clinched a playoff spot on the last game of the season, at home against the Rangers, winning 5–0 with the help of a Claude Giroux hat trick. In that game, Giroux became the first Flyer to have a 100-point season since Eric Lindros in 1995–96, finishing second in league scoring and fourth in MVP voting, while Couturier was a finalist for the Selke Trophy, and Simmonds was a finalist for the Mark Messier Leadership Award.

After failing to meet expectations to start the 2018–19 season, Ron Hextall was fired as general manager. Two weeks later, Dave Hakstol was fired as head coach after the Flyers' 12–15–4 start to the season. Chuck Fletcher was hired as the team's general manager on December 3, 2018, and would later be named the team's president, after Paul Holmgren stepped down from the role. Due to racial controversy involving vocalist Kate Smith, at the end of the 2018–19 season, the Flyers removed her statue from outside the stadium and stopped playing her version of "God Bless America". The Flyers fell apart as the season went on, missing the playoffs.

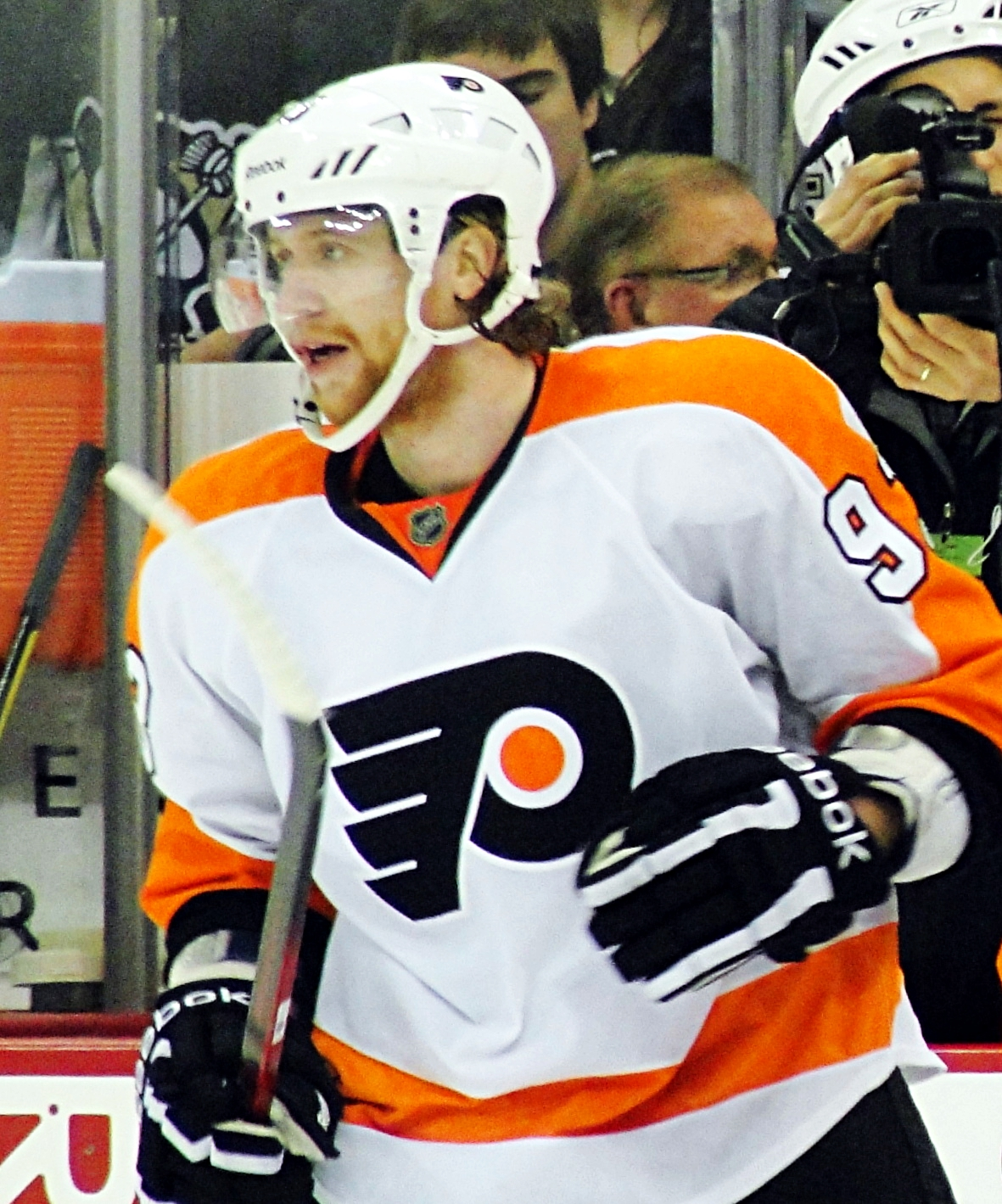
Jakub Voráček played for the Flyers from 2011 to 2021.

Heading into the 2019–20 season, the Flyers hired coach Alain Vigneault and signed forward Kevin Hayes in the hopes of bringing the team to cup contender status again. Opening day took place in the Czech Republic, Voracek's birthplace. The Flyers beat the Blackhawks 4–2. The Flyers started off the season very well, tying a team record for the best November in team history with a record of 10–3–4. The Flyers produced consistent, cohesive hockey throughout the season. One of the most notable progressions in the team was the chemistry of the team and the success of the second line, which consisted of Scott Laughton, Kevin Hayes, and Travis Konecny. In February, the team pulled away from the pack of Wild-Card spot chasers and reached second place in the Metropolitan Division following a home win against the Rangers that put their February record at 9–3. The Flyers ended up with a nine-game winning streak, losing at home against the Boston Bruins, the NHL's points leader. The Flyers were scheduled to play at Tampa Bay on March 12, but the NHL suspended all games earlier in the day due to COVID-19 concerns. The Flyers were second in the Metropolitan Division, only 1 point behind the Capitals.

The Flyers entered the 2020 playoffs "bubble" in Toronto as the fourth seed in the Eastern Conference, meaning they had clinched a playoff appearance and were to play in a seeding round-robin between the top four teams of the conference. The Flyers beat the Bruins in the first game 4–1, the Capitals in the second game 3–1, and the Lightning in the third game 4–1 to claim the top seed in the conference for the first time since the 1999–2000 season. Despite high expectations after sweeping the round-robin play, going 0 for 11 on the power play was a detriment to the team's play. Regardless, they went into the first round against the 12th-seeded Canadiens, who had beat the fifth-seeded Penguins in the qualifying series, with much confidence. The Flyers jumped to a 3–1 series lead behind young goaltender Carter Hart, who recorded two consecutive shutouts in games 3 and 4. Montreal won game five to extend their season, but the Flyers went on to win the series in six games. In the second round against the New York Islanders, the Flyers fell behind 3–1 in the series partially due to lack of production from the top two lines. The Flyers would rally to tie the series with an overtime win in game five and a double-overtime win in game six, but the Islanders shut out the Flyers 4–0 in game seven to end their season.

Despite having lost in the playoffs, the team had very high expectations entering the 2020–21 season. The NHL did not begin the season until January 13, 2021, due to the ongoing global pandemic. NHL divisions would be temporarily realigned due to travel restrictions, placing the Flyers in the East Division. The team managed to finish the first month of play tied for first place in the league, with a 7–2–1 record. However things began to unravel as the season continued. The team fell out of playoff contention by early March and would finish the season with the most goals scored against in the league. Management vowed to address the issues the team had suffered during the season by making several trades and free agent signings. On July 17, 2021, the team traded Nolan Patrick and Philippe Myers to the Nashville Predators in exchange for defenseman Ryan Ellis. The following week the team traded for defenseman Rasmus Ristolainen from the Buffalo Sabres in exchange for Robert Hägg, a 2021 first-round pick, and a 2023 second-round pick; and traded Voracek back to the Columbus Blue Jackets for forward Cam Atkinson. The team also signed veteran defenseman Keith Yandle, back up goaltender Martin Jones and forward Derick Brassard to short-term deals.

The Flyers began the 2021–22 season off to a steady pace by winning six out of the first ten games of the season, however once again things would start to fall apart for the team. Newly acquired Ryan Ellis was placed on injured reserved on November 16 and would be out for the remainder of the season, due to a lower body injury sustained in the preseason. The team then went on a ten-game losing streak at which point Alain Vigneault was fired from head coaching duties following a 7–1 loss to the Tampa Bay Lightning, and replaced by assistant coach Mike Yeo. The team would show a brief sign of resurgence under Yeo before the team collapsed again by losing a franchise record thirteen games in a row. In early February, center Sean Couturier was ruled out for the rest of the season after completing back surgery for an injury sustained earlier in the year. On March 17, longtime Flyers captain Claude Giroux played in his 1,000th career NHL game, a 5–4 home victory over the Nashville Predators, becoming the second Flyer in history to play 1000 games with the franchise. On March 19, Giroux was traded along with Connor Bunnaman, German Rubtsov and a 2024 fifth-round pick to the Florida Panthers in exchange for Owen Tippett, a 2024 first-round draft pick, and a 2023 third-round pick. The team finished the season with the fourth worst record in the league going 25–46–11, failing to make the playoffs.

John Tortorella was hired as the team's new head coach, signing a four-year contract. Before the beginning of the 2022–23 season, it was announced that Ryan Ellis would once again sit out for the season with a possible career ending injury. To make matters worse, it was announced soon after that Sean Couturier would require a second back surgery and also be forced to sit out for the entire season. The team would once again have a modest start to the season by finishing the month of October with an 8–4–2 record. However the team was unable to capitalize on their early momentum and fell in the standings with a ten-game winless streak in the month of November. On March 10, general manager Chuck Fletcher was fired and assistant general manager Daniel Brière was named interim general manager. The team finished the season with a record of 31–38–13, missing the playoffs for a third consecutive year.

=== New Era of Orange (2023–present) ===
After the 2022–23 season ended, the organization began a complete overhaul of the front office. On May 11, 2023, the team hired former Flyer Keith Jones as president of hockey operations and named Daniel Brière as permanent general manager of the team. Soon after the team fired longtime player development coaches Kjell Samuelsson and John Riley, as well as senior advisor Mike O'Connell. The front office overhaul was accompanied by uniform changes, with the team branding it as a "New Era of Orange".

The first major move of the Jones/Briere era came in the 2023 entry draft when the Flyers selected Russian prospect Matvei Michkov with the seventh overall pick. However, Michkov had already been signed to a contract with SKA Saint Petersburg of the Kontinental Hockey League (KHL) for another three seasons, and his time of arrival to the NHL was still unknown.

Despite low expectations amid the rebuild, the Flyers remained in playoff contention well into the 2023–24 season. On March 23, 2024, the team held a record of 36–26–9 while four points up on the third playoff spot in the Metropolitan Division. However, a collapse ensued as the Flyers won just two of their last 11 games to miss the playoffs for the fourth consecutive season. A major development occurred in the middle of the 2023–24 season when Carter Hart, thought to be the franchise goaltender of the future for the Flyers, took an indefinite leave from the team after being named as a suspect in the Hockey Canada sexual assault scandal. Hart became a restricted free agent following the 2023–24 season and did not return to the team.

The 2024–25 season began with optimism, as SKA Saint Petersburg allowed Matvei Michkov to leave his contract early and join the Flyers two seasons earlier than originally expected. Despite the excitement of Michkov and the performance from the season prior, the Flyers struggled throughout the 2024–25 season. After posting a 2–10–1 record to start the month of March, head coach John Tortorella was fired on March 27, 2025, and Brad Shaw was named interim head coach for the remainder of the season. Tortorella posted a 97–107–33 record in nearly three seasons with the Flyers. The Flyers finished the season tied with the Boston Bruins for the worst record in the Eastern Conference, missing the playoffs for the fifth consecutive season.

Major moves in the 2025 off-season began with the hiring of former Flyer Rick Tocchet as the 25th head coach in franchise history on May 14. On June 23, the Flyers traded Ryan Poehling, a 2025 second-round pick, and a 2026 fourth-round pick to the Anaheim Ducks in exchange for center Trevor Zegras. At the 2025 entry draft, the Flyers selected winger Porter Martone with the sixth overall pick.

The Flyers began the 2025–26 season with expectations remaining low as the rebuild continued. The team hovered just outside of playoff contention throughout the season until the league-wide break for the 2026 Winter Olympics. Following the break, the team went on a late-season surge. To accompany the surge, Porter Martone, who had been playing in college at Michigan State, was signed to the team on March 29, 2026, to begin play for the remainder of the season. The Flyers would go 16–7–1 following the Olympic break, culminating with a shootout victory on April 13 over the Carolina Hurricanes as they clinched a playoff berth for the first time since the 2019–20 season. In the first round of the 2026 playoffs, they matched up with their in-state rivals, the Pittsburgh Penguins, in the fifth postseason meeting between the two teams since 2008. The Flyers quickly jumped out to a 3–0 series lead and eventually defeated the Penguins in six games, winning their first playoff series since 2020. They advanced to the second round where they met the top-seeded Carolina Hurricanes, coached by former Flyers center Rod Brind'Amour. The Hurricanes swept the Flyers in four games, ending their playoff run.

== Logo and jerseys ==
=== Colors, name and logo ===
On April 4, 1966, Bill Putnam—a member of the Philadelphia group that was selected by the NHL for one of the six new franchises—announced a name-the-team contest and orange, black and white as the team colors. Wanting what he referred to as "hot" colors, Putnam's choice was influenced by the orange and white of his alma mater—the University of Texas at Austin—and the orange and black of Philadelphia's previous NHL team, the Quakers. Also announced on April 4 was the hiring of a Chicago firm to design the team's arena.

Flyers logo since the team's inception in 1967

Details of the name-the-team contest were released on July 12, 1966. Ballots were available at local Acme Markets grocery stores, the sponsor of the contest. The top prize was an RCA 21" color television, with two season tickets for both the second- and third-prize winners, and a pair of single-game tickets for the next 100 winners. Among the names considered behind the scenes were Quakers, Ramblers and Liberty Bells. The first two were the names of previous Philadelphia hockey teams and – given the connotations of losing (Quakers) and the minor leagues (Ramblers) – were passed over. Liberty Bells, although seriously considered, was also the name of a local race track. Bashers, Blizzards, Bruisers, Huskies, Keystones, Knights, Lancers, Raiders and Sabres were among the other names considered.

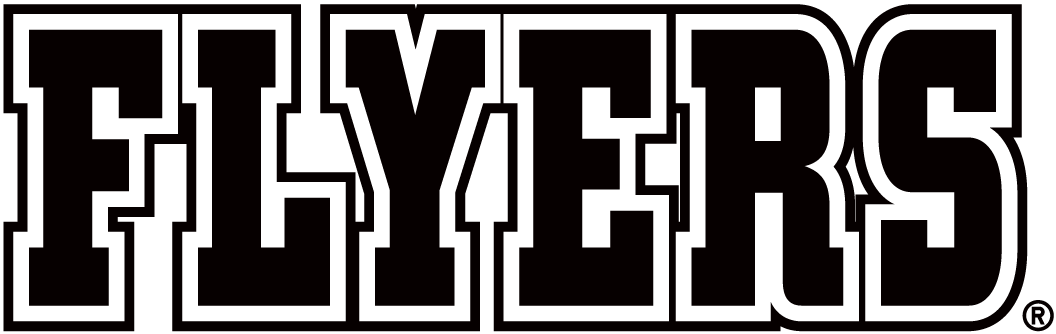
Flyers wordmark used from 1967 to 2016

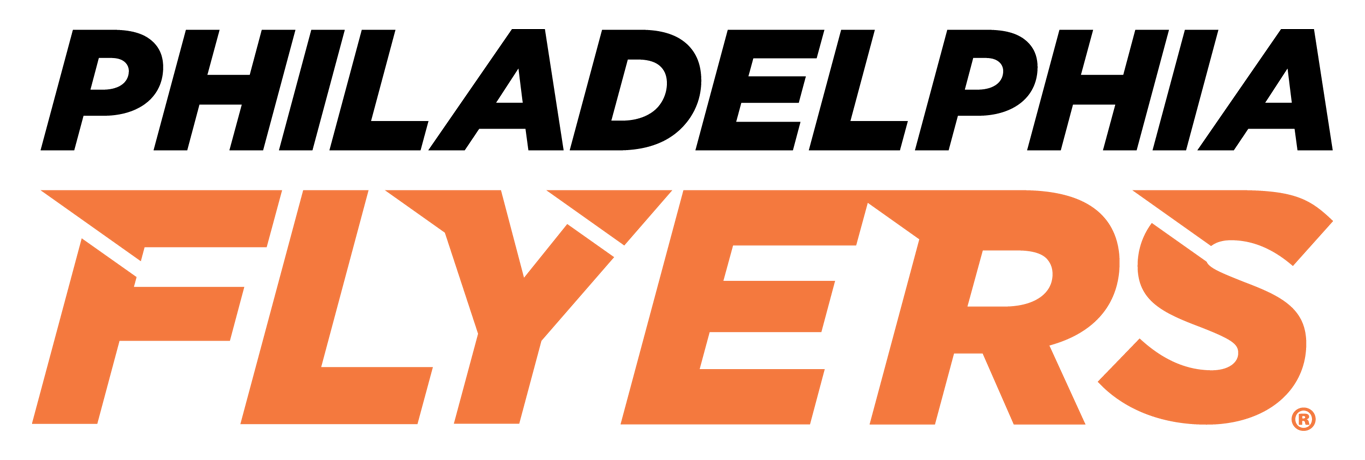
Flyers wordmark used since 2016

It was Ed Snider's sister Phyllis who named the team when she suggested "Flyers" on a return trip from a Broadway play. Ed knew immediately it would be the winning name, since it captured the speed of the game and went well phonetically with Philadelphia. On August 3, 1966, the team name was announced. Of the 11,000 ballots received, more than 100 selected Flyers as the team name and were entered into a drawing to select a winner. Alec Stockard, a nine-year-old boy from Narberth, Pennsylvania, who had spelled it "Fliers" on his entry, won the drawing and was declared the winner.

With the name and colors already known, Philadelphia advertising firm Mel Richmann Inc. was hired to design a logo and jersey. With Tom Paul as head of the project, artist Sam Ciccone designed both the logo and jerseys to represent speed. Ciccone's winged "P" design—four stylized wings attached to a slanted "P" with an orange dot to represent a puck—was considered the "obvious choice" over his other designs, which included a winged skate. Ciccone's jersey design, a stripe down each shoulder and down the arms, represented wings. The flying "P" has remained the same since the beginning (excluding minor tweaks to the shade of orange) and was ranked the sixth-best NHL logo in a 2008 Hockey News poll. The Flyers unveiled a 3D version of this logo with metallic accents during the 2002–03 season which was used on orange third jerseys until the end of the 2006–07 season.

=== Jerseys ===
As with his logo design, Ciccone's jersey design was meant to represent speed. The home jersey was orange with a white stripe down each shoulder and down the arms (meant to represent wings) with a white number on the back and black sleeve numbers. The away jersey was white with orange striping, an orange number on the back and white sleeve numbers. Other than a few minor alterations to the numbers and the switch the NHL made to wear white at home and dark on the road for 1970–71, this general design was used until the end of the 1981–82 season.

The Flyers unveiled second-generation jerseys for the 1982–83 season. The main difference was the increased width of the shoulder and arm stripes with black trim added to the border of the stripes. Also, a pinstripe (black for the white jersey, orange for the dark) was added to the bottom of each sleeve. With the exception of a similarly designed black jersey replacing the orange and the NHL switching back to wearing darks at home and whites on the road prior to 2003–04, this design was used until the end of the 2006–07 season.

Many NHL teams started using third jerseys during the mid-1990s and the Flyers unveiled a black third jersey that was similar in design to their second-generation jerseys during the 1997–98 season. During the 2000 Stanley Cup playoffs, the black jersey became the primary dark jersey with the orange jersey being retired after the 2000–01 season (although it was worn for one final game early in the following season on Halloween night). In 2002–03, a new orange third jersey was introduced which was a radical departure from any jersey the Flyers had used before. Unique striping and fonts were used along with the aforementioned metallic 3D logo and the first use of a color other than orange, black or white on a Flyers jersey – silver/gray. These jerseys were used until the end of the 2006–07 season.

The Flyers, along with the rest of the NHL, unveiled new Rbk Edge jerseys prior to the 2007–08 season. The black jersey featured white shoulders with orange and black sections at the elbow and black cuffs. The white road jersey featured orange shoulders with black and white sections at the elbow, and black cuffs. The Flyers unveiled a new orange third jersey based on their 1973–74 jerseys during the 2008–09 season, featuring white player nameplates with black letters which were used occasionally during that season. This uniform replaced the black jerseys as the primary home jersey during the 2009 Stanley Cup playoffs and the subsequent 2009–10 season. The team wore the 1973–74 white jersey – reverse of their current home uniform but with a black nameplate with white lettering – at the 2010 Winter Classic versus the Boston Bruins at Fenway Park. For the 2010–11 season, the Winter Classic jersey was adopted as the team's primary road jersey and the team's alternate black jersey was retired.

In January 2012, for their second Winter Classic appearance – this time against their arch-rivals the New York Rangers at Citizens Bank Park – the Flyers wore a traditional sweater design in orange with cream and black trim, featuring a cream nameplate with black lettering, as well as black numbers. It also contained a neck tie string which no other Flyers jersey has had before it. This design was later adopted as a third jersey for the 2014–15 season.

For the 2016–17 season, the Flyers retired their Winter Classic third jerseys in favor of a commemorative 50th-anniversary jersey. The uniform is white with orange and black striping, along with gold numbers, black nameplate with white lettering bordered in gold, and the classic Flyers logo with gold borders. The franchise's founding season is inscribed on the neckline.

The Flyers wore a black uniform for the 2017 Stadium Series, featuring enlarged black numbers with white trim, orange striping on the sleeves and tail, and orange nameplate with black lettering. The said uniform will become the team's third uniform option starting in the 2018–19 season.

During the 2019 Stadium Series, the Flyers wore orange and black uniforms minus the white elements. The black helmets also featured an enlarged Flyers logo on both sides.

For the 2020–21 season, the Flyers released a special "Reverse Retro" alternate uniform. The design was a callback to the darker burnt orange jersey they wore from 1982 to 2001; however, the white and black colors on the sleeves and numbers were reversed. In the 2022–23 season, the Flyers' "Reverse Retro" uniform was based on their early 1980s uniforms, but with black and orange relegated to the logo and lower sleeves.

The Flyers unveiled a new uniform design ahead of the 2023–24 season, reverting to the burnt orange shade they wore with the 1984–2007 uniforms. This design featured wider shoulder and sleeve stripes, single-colored sleeve numbers (black on the home uniform, white on the road uniform), and a black bottom stripe, all of which were visual nods to previous Flyers uniforms. The contrasting nameplate was also retained. The black alternate first used in the 2017 Stadium Series was also kept in circulation.

The Flyers' 2024 Stadium Series uniform featured a white base with the primary logo crest in front, thick black and orange sleeve stripes, orange numbers on the shoulders and back, and black nameplates which stretch from shoulder to shoulder.

In the 2026–27 season, the Flyers unveiled a "Hometown Remix" alternate uniform, which commemorated Philadelphia's role in the Declaration of Independence. The dark gray-based design featured orange numbers with parchment trim and a crack taken from the Liberty Bell. The six stripes along the sleeves commemorated the Flyers' 60th anniversary.

=== Cooperall pants ===
The Flyers were the first and one of only two NHL teams (the Hartford Whalers being the other) to wear Cooperalls, hockey pants that extend from the waist to the ankles, in 1981–82. They wore them the following season as well, but returned to the traditional hockey pants in 1983–84 due to Cooperalls being banned from the NHL for safety reasons.

=== Mascots ===
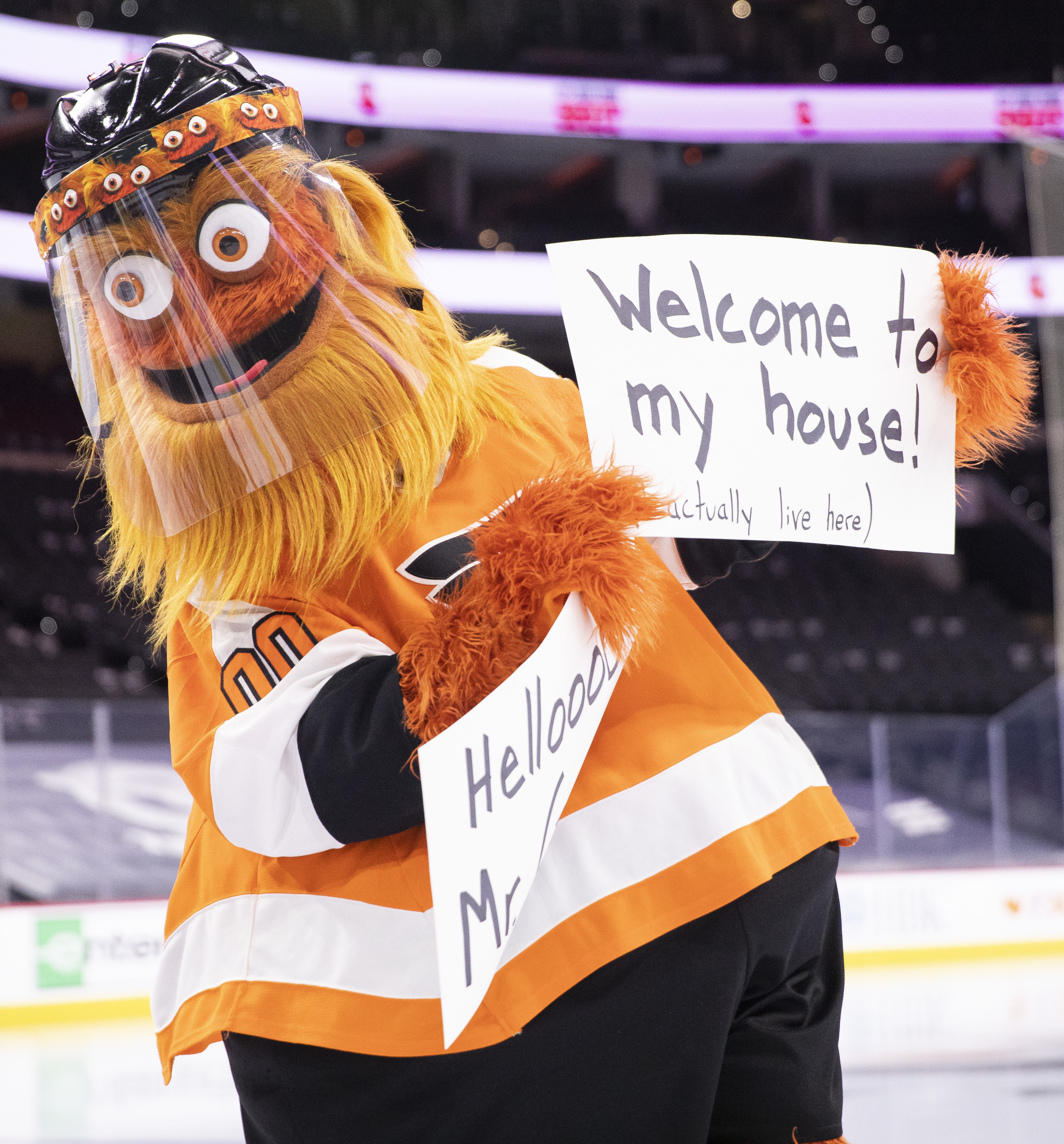
Gritty, the current mascot of the Flyers

The Flyers debuted a short-lived skating mascot named "Slapshot" in 1976 but dropped the character by the next season. Slapshot was the first mascot in Flyers' team history before Gritty, although the team did occasionally employ the services of "Phlex", the then-mascot of the team's minor-league affiliate Philadelphia Phantoms (1996–2009), who became the Adirondack Phantoms (2009–2014) and are now re-branded the Lehigh Valley Phantoms, playing in the PPL Center in Allentown, Pennsylvania.

On September 24, 2018, the Flyers introduced their new mascot, "Gritty", a seven-foot tall, fuzzy orange creature.

== Season-by-season record ==
This is a partial list of the last five seasons completed by the Flyers. For the full season-by-season history, see List of Philadelphia Flyers seasons

Note: GP = Games played, W = Wins, L = Losses, T = Ties, OTL = Overtime Losses, Pts = Points, GF = Goals for, GA = Goals against

Season	GP	W	L	OTL	Pts	GF	GA	Finish	Playoffs
2021–22	82	25	46	11	61	211	298	8th, Metropolitan	Did not qualify
2022–23	82	31	38	13	75	222	277	7th, Metropolitan	Did not qualify
2023–24	82	38	33	11	87	235	261	6th, Metropolitan	Did not qualify
2024–25	82	33	39	10	76	238	286	8th, Metropolitan	Did not qualify
2025–26	82	43	27	12	98	250	243	3rd, Metropolitan	Lost in second round, 0–4 (Hurricanes)

== Players and personnel ==
=== Current roster ===
Updated November 11, 2026

No.	Nat	Player	Pos	S/G	Age	Acquired	Birthplace
52	(United States)	Noel Acciari	C	R	34	2026	Johnston, Rhode Island
86	(Canada)	Denver Barkey	C	L	21	2023	Newmarket, Ontario
44	(Canada)	Simon Benoit	D	L	28	2026	Laval, Quebec
59	(Canada)	Oliver Bonk	D	R	21	2023	Ottawa, Ontario
58	(Canada)	Michael Bunting	LW	L	31	2026	Scarborough, Ontario
27	(United States)	Noah Cates	LW	L	27	2017	Stillwater, Minnesota
14	(Canada)	Sean Couturier (C)	C	L	33	2011	Phoenix, Arizona
9	(Canada)	Jamie Drysdale	D	R	24	2024	Toronto, Ontario
22	(United States)	Christian Dvorak	C	L	30	2025	Palos, Illinois
71	(Canada)	Tyson Foerster	RW	R	24	2020	Alliston, Ontario
17	(Russia)	Nikita Grebenkin	RW	L	23	2025	Serov, Russia
5	(Czech Republic)	David Jiříček	D	R	22	2026	Klatovy, Czech Republic
54	(United States)	Cole Knuble	RW	R	22	2023	Grand Rapids, Michigan
11	(Canada)	Travis Konecny (A)	RW	R	29	2015	London, Ontario
94	(Canada)	Porter Martone	RW	R	20	2025	Peterborough, Ontario
39	(Russia)	Matvei Michkov	RW	L	21	2023	Perm, Russia
55	(Finland)	Rasmus Ristolainen	D	R	32	2021	Turku, Finland
6	(Canada)	Travis Sanheim (A)	D	L	30	2014	Elkhorn, Manitoba
24	(United States)	Nick Seeler	D	L	33	2021	Eden Prairie, Minnesota
74	(Canada)	Owen Tippett	RW	R	27	2022	Peterborough, Ontario
80	(Czech Republic)	Daniel Vladař	G	L	29	2025	Prague, Czech Republic
53	(United States)	Joseph Woll	G	L	28	2026	Dardenne Prairie, Missouri
8	(United States)	Cam York	D	L	25	2019	Anaheim Hills, California
46	(United States)	Trevor Zegras	C	L	25	2025	Bedford, New York

=== Team captains ===
- Lou Angotti, 1967–1968
- Ed Van Impe, 1968–1973
- Bobby Clarke, 1973–1979
- Mel Bridgman, 1979–1981
- Bill Barber, 1981–1983
- Bobby Clarke, 1983–1984
- Dave Poulin, 1984–1989
- Ron Sutter, 1989–1991
- Rick Tocchet, 1991–1992
- Kevin Dineen, 1993–1994
- Eric Lindros, 1994–2000
- Éric Desjardins, 2000–2001
- Keith Primeau, 2001–2006
- Derian Hatcher, 2006
- Peter Forsberg, 2006–2007
- Jason Smith, 2007–2008
- Mike Richards, 2008–2011
- Chris Pronger, 2011–2013
- Claude Giroux, 2013–2022
- Sean Couturier, 2024–present

=== Head coaches ===
- Keith Allen, 1966–1969
- Vic Stasiuk, 1969–1971
- Fred Shero, 1971–1978
- Bob McCammon, 1978–1979
- Pat Quinn, 1979–1982
- Bob McCammon, 1982–1984
- Mike Keenan, 1984–1988
- Paul Holmgren, 1988–1991
- Bill Dineen, 1991–1993
- Terry Simpson, 1993–1994
- Terry Murray, 1994–1997
- Wayne Cashman, 1997–1998
- Roger Neilson, 1998–2000
- Craig Ramsay, 2000
- Bill Barber, 2000–2002
- Ken Hitchcock, 2002–2006
- John Stevens, 2006–2009
- Peter Laviolette, 2009–2013
- Craig Berube, 2013–2015
- Dave Hakstol, 2015–2018
- Scott Gordon (interim), 2018–2019
- Alain Vigneault, 2019–2021
- Mike Yeo (interim), 2021–2022
- John Tortorella, 2022–2025
- Brad Shaw (interim), 2025
- Rick Tocchet, 2025–present

=== General managers ===
- Bud Poile, 1966–1969
- Keith Allen, 1969–1983
- Bob McCammon, 1983–1984
- Bobby Clarke, 1984–1990
- Russ Farwell, 1990–1994
- Bobby Clarke, 1994–2006
- Paul Holmgren, 2006–2014
- Ron Hextall, 2014–2018
- Chuck Fletcher, 2018–2023
- Daniel Brière, 2023–present

=== First-round draft picks ===
- 1967: Serge Bernier (5th overall)
- 1968: Lew Morrison (8th overall)
- 1969: Bob Currier (6th overall)
- 1971: Larry Wright (8th overall), Pierre Plante (9th overall)
- 1972: Bill Barber (7th overall)
- 1975: Mel Bridgman (1st overall)
- 1976: Mark Suzor (17th overall)
- 1977: Kevin McCarthy (17th overall)
- 1978: Behn Wilson (6th overall), Ken Linseman (7th overall), Danny Lucas (14th overall)
- 1979: Brian Propp (14th overall)
- 1980: Mike Stothers (21st overall)
- 1981: Steve Smith (16th overall)
- 1982: Ron Sutter (4th overall)
- 1985: Glen Seabrooke (21st overall)
- 1986: Kerry Huffman (20th overall)
- 1987: Darren Rumble (20th overall)
- 1988: Claude Boivin (14th overall)
- 1990: Mike Ricci (4th overall)
- 1991: Peter Forsberg (6th overall)
- 1992: Ryan Sittler (7th overall)
- 1995: Brian Boucher (22nd overall)
- 1996: Dainius Zubrus (15th overall)
- 1998: Simon Gagné (22nd overall)
- 1999: Maxime Ouellet (22nd overall)
- 2000: Justin Williams (28th overall)
- 2001: Jeff Woywitka (27th overall)
- 2002: Joni Pitkänen (4th overall)
- 2003: Jeff Carter (11th overall), Mike Richards (24th overall)
- 2005: Steve Downie (29th overall)
- 2006: Claude Giroux (22nd overall)
- 2007: James van Riemsdyk (2nd overall)
- 2008: Luca Sbisa (19th overall)
- 2011: Sean Couturier (8th overall)
- 2012: Scott Laughton (20th overall)
- 2013: Samuel Morin (11th overall)
- 2014: Travis Sanheim (17th overall)
- 2015: Ivan Provorov (7th overall), Travis Konecny (24th overall)
- 2016: German Rubtsov (22nd overall)
- 2017: Nolan Patrick (2nd overall), Morgan Frost (27th overall)
- 2018: Joel Farabee (14th overall), Jay O'Brien (19th overall)
- 2019: Cam York (14th overall)
- 2020: Tyson Foerster (23rd overall)
- 2022: Cutter Gauthier (5th overall)
- 2023: Matvei Michkov (7th overall), Oliver Bonk (22nd overall)
- 2024: Jett Luchanko (13th overall)
- 2025: Porter Martone (6th overall), Jack Nesbitt (12th overall)
- 2026: Maksim Sokolovskii (27th overall)

== Honored members ==
=== Hall of Fame ===
The Philadelphia Flyers recognize an affiliation with a number of inductees to the Hockey Hall of Fame, including 14 former players and seven builders of the sport. The seven individuals recognized as builders by the Hall of Fame includes former general managers, head coaches, and owners. Inducted in 1984, Bernie Parent was the first Flyers-affiliated player to be inducted into the Hockey Hall of Fame.

In addition to players and builders, members of Philadelphia's sports media have also been recognized by the Hockey Hall of Fame. In 1997, Gene Hart, a sports announcer for the Flyers, received the Foster Hewitt Memorial Award from the Hockey Hall of Fame for his contributions to hockey broadcasting. In 2013, Jay Greenberg of the Philadelphia Daily News was awarded the Elmer Ferguson Memorial Award for his work in hockey journalism.

Players

- Bill Barber
- Bobby Clarke
- Paul Coffey
- Peter Forsberg
- Dale Hawerchuk
- Mark Howe
- Eric Lindros
- Adam Oates
- Bernie Parent
- Chris Pronger
- Mark Recchi
- Jeremy Roenick
- Darryl Sittler
- Allan Stanley

Builders

- Keith Allen
- Ken Hitchcock
- Roger Neilson
- Bud Poile
- Pat Quinn
- Fred Shero
- Ed Snider

=== Retired numbers ===
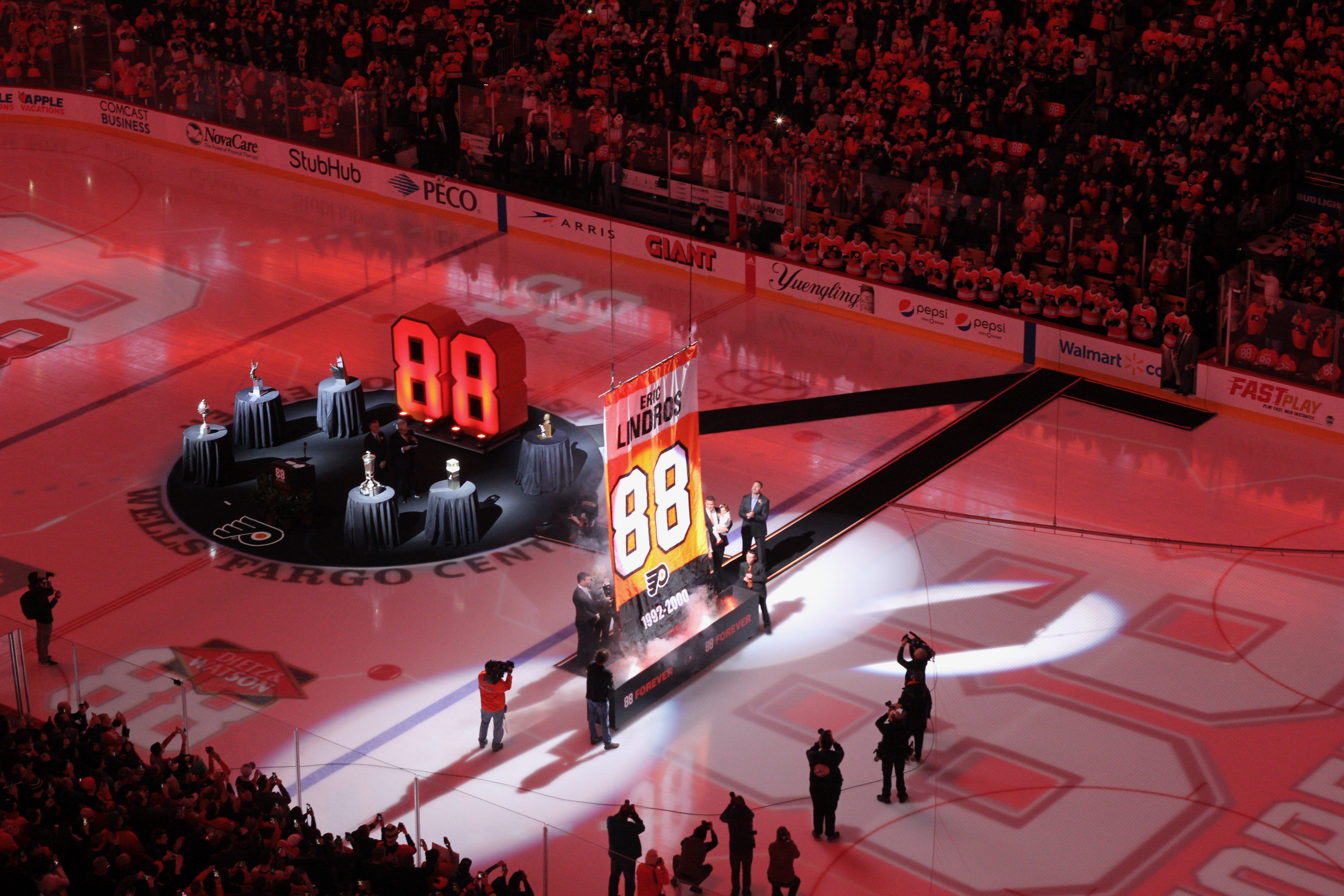
Raising of the no. 88 banner in honor of Eric Lindros

The Flyers have retired six of their jersey numbers and taken others out of circulation. Barry Ashbee's number 4 was retired a few months after his death from leukemia. Bernie Parent's number 1 (Note: Parent wore number 30 during his first stint with the Flyers) and Bobby Clarke's number 16 were retired less than a year after the players' retirement, while Bill Barber's number 7, Mark Howe's number 2, and Eric Lindros' number 88 were retired shortly after their inductions into the Hockey Hall of Fame. The number 31, last worn by goaltender Pelle Lindbergh, was removed from circulation after Lindbergh's death on November 11, 1985, but it is not officially retired. The NHL retired Wayne Gretzky's No. 99 for all its member teams at the 2000 NHL All-Star Game. Shortly after longtime owner Ed Snider's death in 2016, a banner honoring him was raised into the rafters alongside the retired numbers.

Philadelphia Flyers retired numbers
No.	Player	Position	Career	Date of retirement
1	Bernie Parent	Goaltender	1967–1971, 1973–1979	October 11, 1979
2	Mark Howe	Defense	1982–1992	March 6, 2012
4	Barry Ashbee	Defense	1970–1974	October 13, 1977
7	Bill Barber	Left wing	1972–1984	October 11, 1990
16	Bobby Clarke	Center	1969–1984	November 15, 1984
88	Eric Lindros	Center	1992–2000	January 18, 2018
–	Ed Snider	Owner	1967–2016	October 20, 2016

=== Flyers Hall of Fame ===
Established in 1988, the Flyers Hall of Fame was designed to "permanently honor those individuals who have contributed to the franchise's success." Candidates for the hall are nominated and voted upon by a panel of media members and team officials. To date, 30 former players and executives have been inducted.

- Bobby Clarke and Bernie Parent, 1988
- Keith Allen, Bill Barber and Ed Snider, 1989
- Rick MacLeish and Fred Shero, 1990
- Barry Ashbee and Gary Dornhoefer, 1991
- Gene Hart and Reggie Leach, 1992
- Joe Scott and Ed Van Impe, 1993
- Tim Kerr, 1994
- Joe Watson, 1996
- Brian Propp, 1999
- Mark Howe, 2001
- Dave Poulin, 2004
- Ron Hextall, 2008
- Dave Schultz, 2009
- John LeClair and Eric Lindros, 2014
- Éric Desjardins and Rod Brind'Amour, 2015
- Jimmy Watson, 2016
- Rick Tocchet and Paul Holmgren, 2021
- Mark Recchi, 2024
- Simon Gagné and Bob Kelly, 2027

== Franchise records ==
=== Statistical leaders ===
==== Scoring leaders ====
These are the top-ten point-scorers in franchise history. Figures are updated after each completed NHL regular season.

- * – current Flyers player

Note: Pos = Position; GP = Games played; G = Goals; A = Assists; Pts = Points; P/G = Points per game

Points
Player	Pos	GP	G	A	Pts	P/G
Bobby Clarke	C	1,144	358	852	1,210	1.06
Claude Giroux	C	1,000	291	609	900	.90
Bill Barber	LW	903	420	463	883	.98
Brian Propp	LW	790	369	480	849	1.07
Rick MacLeish	C	741	328	369	697	.94
Eric Lindros	C	486	290	369	659	1.36
Tim Kerr	RW	601	363	287	650	1.08
John LeClair	LW	649	333	310	643	.99
Mark Recchi	RW	602	232	395	627	1.04
Jakub Voráček	RW	727	177	427	604	.83

Goals
Player	Pos	G
Bill Barber	LW	420
Brian Propp	LW	369
Tim Kerr	RW	363
Bobby Clarke	C	358
John LeClair	LW	333
Rick MacLeish	C	328
Reggie Leach	RW	306
Claude Giroux	C	291
Eric Lindros	C	290
Simon Gagné	LW	264

Assists
Player	Pos	A
Bobby Clarke	C	852
Claude Giroux	C	609
Brian Propp	LW	480
Bill Barber	LW	463
Jakub Voráček	RW	427
Mark Recchi	RW	395
Eric Lindros	C	369
Rick MacLeish	C	369
Rod Brind'Amour	C	366
Sean Couturier*	C	361

==== Goaltending leaders ====
These are the top-ten goaltenders in franchise history by wins. Figures are updated after each completed NHL regular season.

- * – current Flyers player

Note: GP = Games played; W = Wins; L = Losses; T/O = Ties/Overtime losses; GA = Goal against; GAA = Goals against average; SA = Shots against; SV% = Save percentage; SO = Shutouts

Goaltenders
Player	GP	W	L	T/O	GA	GAA	SA	SV%	SO
Ron Hextall	489	240	172	58	1,367	2.91	13,026	.895	18
Bernie Parent	486	232	141	104	1,141	2.43	13,820	.917	50
Steve Mason	231	104	78	36	540	2.47	6,614	.918	14
Carter Hart	227	96	93	29	625	2.94	6,630	.906	6
Wayne Stephenson	165	93	35	22	424	2.77	4,114	.897	10
Roman Čechmánek	163	92	43	22	306	1.96	3,963	.923	20
Bob Froese	144	92	29	12	370	2.74	3,678	.899	12
Pelle Lindbergh	157	87	49	15	503	3.31	4,432	.887	7
Pete Peeters	179	85	57	20	532	3.20	4,751	.888	5
Doug Favell	215	76	87	37	559	2.79	6,746	.917	16

=== Single season records ===
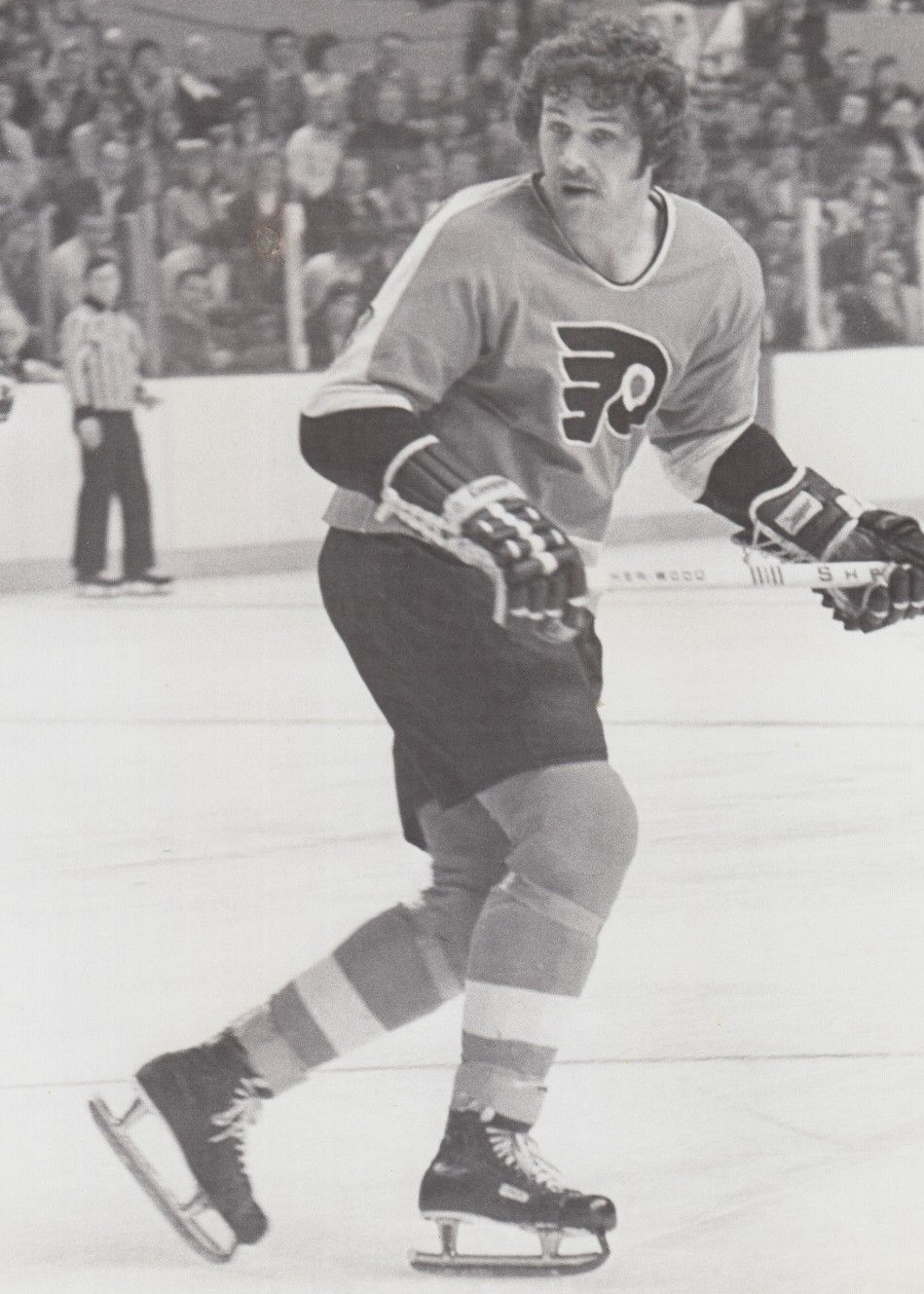
Dave Schultz holds the NHL record for most penalty minutes in a season with 472

==== Regular season ====
- Most goals in a season – Reggie Leach, 61 (1975–76)
- Most assists in a season – Bobby Clarke, 89 (1974–75, 1975–76)
- Most points in a season – Mark Recchi, 123 (1992–93)
- Most penalty minutes in a season – Dave Schultz, 472 (1974–75, NHL record)
- Most points in a season, defenseman – Mark Howe, 82 (1985–86)
- Most points in a season, rookie – Mikael Renberg, 82 (1993–94)
- Most power play goals in a season – Tim Kerr, 34 (1985–86, NHL record)
- Most wins in a season – Bernie Parent, 47 (1973–74)
- Most shutouts in a season – Bernie Parent, 12 (1973–74, 1974–75)

==== Playoffs ====
- Most goals in playoffs – Reggie Leach, 19 (1975–76, NHL record)
- Most assists in playoffs – Pelle Eklund, 20 (1986–87)
- Most points in playoffs – Daniel Brière, 30 (2009–10)
- Most penalty minutes in playoffs – Dave Schultz, 139 (1973–74)
- Most points in playoffs, defenseman – Doug Crossman (1986–87) and Chris Pronger (2009–10), 18
- Most points in playoffs, rookie – Ville Leino, 21 (2009–10, NHL record)
- Most power play goals in playoffs – Tim Kerr, 8 (1988–89)
- Most wins in a playoffs – Ron Hextall, 15 (1986–87)
- Most shutouts in playoffs – Bernie Parent, 4 (1974–75)

==== Team ====
- Most points in a season – 118 (1975–76)
- Most wins in a season – 53 (1984–85, 1985–86)
- Most goals scored – 350 (1983–84)
- Fewest goals allowed (full season) – 164 (1973–74)
- Longest undefeated streak – 35 games (1979–80, NHL record)

== Rivalries ==
=== Pittsburgh Penguins ===
Also known as the Battle of Pennsylvania, the Flyers–Penguins rivalry is considered by many to be one of the most intense rivalries in the NHL. Both teams entered the league in 1967 with the Flyers finding success in the league early on while the Penguins struggled in the early years. The Flyers record against the Penguins from 1967 to 1989 was 89–36–19, and most notably during this time the Penguins had a 42-game winless streak at the Spectrum, lasting from 1974 until 1989. The two teams met for the first time in the playoffs in the 1989 division finals, where the Flyers defeated the higher-seeded Penguins in seven games. The teams faced each other again in the 1997 conference quarterfinals, with the Flyers winning the series in five games. Penguins legend Mario Lemieux decided to retire at the end of the series for the first time and left the ice to a standing ovation in Philadelphia after game five. The Flyers would go on to win over the Penguins again in the 2000 conference quarterfinals, most remembered for Keith Primeau scoring the game-winning goal in the fifth overtime period of game four, becoming the third longest playoff game in league history with a total game time of 152 minutes. The Penguins first playoff victory against the Flyers came during the 2008 conference finals, winning the series in five games to advance to the Stanley Cup Final. The two teams would meet again in the playoffs the following year in the 2009 conference quarterfinals, with the Penguins defeating the Flyers in six games. The rivalry would come to a boiling point during the 2012 conference quarterfinals when both teams combined for an NHL record 45 goals in the first four games of a playoff series, as well as accumulating 309 penalty minutes. Game three saw a total combined 158 penalty minutes between the two teams, as well as multiple suspensions. The Flyers went on to win the series in six games. The Penguins defeated the Flyers in the first round of the 2018 playoffs in six games, with the Penguins outscoring the Flyers 28–15. The rivalry has been showcased during the NHL Stadium Series outdoor games in 2017 at Heinz Field in Pittsburgh and in 2019 at Lincoln Financial Field in Philadelphia.

== See also ==
- List of NHL statistical leaders
- South Philadelphia Sports Complex
- Sports in Philadelphia

== Notes ==
Preceded by Montreal Canadiens	Stanley Cup champions 1973–74, 1974–75	Succeeded by Montreal Canadiens
