= Brad F. Grinter =

American actor

- Born: Frank Grinter; May 18, 1922; Illinois, US
- Died: April 1993 (aged 71); Miami, Florida, US
- Occupations: Film director, producer, screenwriter, actor

Brad F. Grinter (May 18, 1922 – April 1993) was an American film director, actor, producer, and screenwriter who is best known for the 1972 cult classic horror film Blood Freak. He also directed the 1970 film Flesh Feast, which stars Veronica Lake in her last film appearance. Brad had two children and his son Randy was a cameraman and had worked on a number of films. His daughter, Lorrie Vickers, found by DNA at 57 years old in 2021 is still living, and in Midland, Texas.

Brad Grinter died in April 1993, in Miami, Florida, at the age of 71.

Brad's son Randy died November 16, 2018, at the age of 69 in Gainesville, Florida, from complications related to dementia.
