= Larry Wright (ice hockey) =

Canadian ice hockey player

- Born: October 8, 1951 (age 74) Regina, Saskatchewan, Canada
- Height: 6 ft 2 in (188 cm)
- Weight: 175 lb (79 kg; 12 st 7 lb)
- Position: Centre
- Shot: Left
- Played for: Philadelphia Flyers; California Seals; Detroit Red Wings
- NHL draft: 8th overall, 1971; Philadelphia Flyers
- Playing career: 1971–1979

Larry Dale Wright (born October 8, 1951) is a Canadian former professional ice hockey centre. He played in 106 National Hockey League (NHL) games over parts of five seasons with the Philadelphia Flyers, California Seals, and Detroit Red Wings.

== Career statistics ==
=== Regular season and playoffs ===
			Regular season					Playoffs
Season	Team	League	GP	G	A	Pts	PIM	GP	G	A	Pts	PIM
1967–68	Regina Pats	WCHL	60	20	47	67	10	4	1	0	1	0
1968–69	Regina Blues	SJHL	42	35	50	85	11	—	—	—	—	—
1969–70	University of Minnesota Duluth	WCHA	28	13	16	29	8	—	—	—	—	—
1970–71	Regina Pats	WCHL	59	24	60	84	43	6	1	3	4	7
1971–72	Philadelphia Flyers	NHL	27	0	1	1	2	—	—	—	—	—
1971–72	Richmond Robins	AHL	44	10	12	22	10	—	—	—	—	—
1972–73	Philadelphia Flyers	NHL	9	0	1	1	4	—	—	—	—	—
1972–73	Richmond Robins	AHL	61	26	25	51	29	4	1	3	4	2
1973–74	Richmond Robins	AHL	52	18	25	43	23	—	—	—	—	—
1974–75	California Golden Seals	NHL	2	0	0	0	0	—	—	—	—	—
1974–75	Salt Lake Golden Eagles	CHL	14	0	3	3	9	11	1	4	5	2
1975–76	Philadelphia Flyers	NHL	2	1	0	1	0	—	—	—	—	—
1975–76	Richmond Robins	AHL	72	28	35	63	38	6	2	3	5	0
1976–77	Düsseldorfer EG	GER	44	30	36	66	—	—	—	—	—	—
1977–78	Detroit Red Wings	NHL	66	3	6	9	13	—	—	—	—	—
1978–79	Kansas City Red Wings	CHL	51	6	24	30	17	1	0	1	1	7
AHL totals			229	82	97	179	100	10	3	6	9	2
NHL totals			106	4	8	12	19	—	—	—	—	—

Preceded by Bob Currier	Philadelphia Flyers' first-round draft pick 1971	Succeeded by Pierre Plante
