= Lew Morrison =

Canadian ice hockey player (1948–2023)

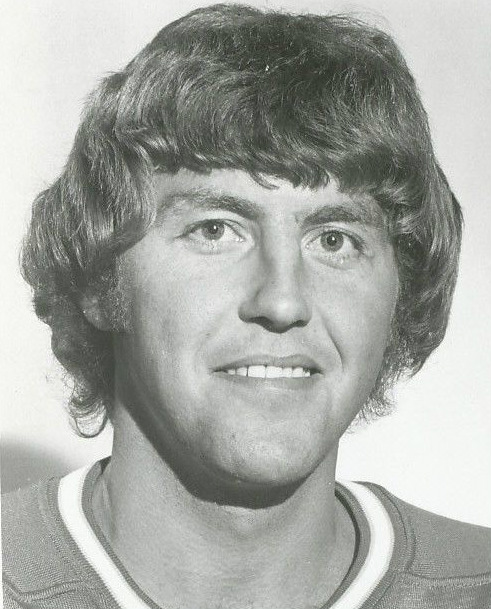
- Born: February 11, 1948 Gainsborough, Saskatchewan, Canada
- Died: July 15, 2023 (aged 75) Hartney, Manitoba, Canada
- Height: 6 ft 0 in (183 cm)
- Weight: 185 lb (84 kg; 13 st 3 lb)
- Position: Right Wing
- Shot: Right
- Played for: Philadelphia Flyers; Atlanta Flames; Washington Capitals; Pittsburgh Penguins
- NHL draft: 8th overall, 1968; Philadelphia Flyers
- Playing career: 1968–1978

Henry Lewis Morrison (February 11, 1948 – July 15, 2023) was a Canadian professional ice hockey player who played 564 National Hockey League (NHL) games for the Philadelphia Flyers, Atlanta Flames, Washington Capitals, and Pittsburgh Penguins between 1969 and 1978. Morrison played junior with the Flin Flon Bombers of the Western Canada Hockey League, and was selected by the Flyers 8th overall in the 1968 NHL Amateur Draft. He made his professional debut that year with the Flyers' American Hockey League affiliate, the Quebec Aces, and joined Philadelphia for the 1969–70 season. After three seasons with the Flyers Morrison was claimed by the expansion Atlanta Flames in 1972, and played two seasons there before joining another expansion team, the Washington Capitals. He briefly played for Washington before being traded to the Pittsburgh Penguins, where he would play the last four years of his career.

Morrison was born in Gainsborough, Saskatchewan and raised in Hartney, Manitoba. He was elected into the Manitoba Hockey Hall of Fame in 2017. He died on July 15, 2023, at the age of 75.

== Career statistics ==
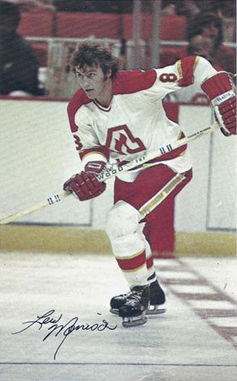
Lew Morrison in 1972 for Atlanta Flames

=== Regular season and playoffs ===
			Regular season					Playoffs
Season	Team	League	GP	G	A	Pts	PIM	GP	G	A	Pts	PIM
1967–68	Flin Flon Bombers	WCHL	56	26	23	49	31	15	7	1	8	15
1968–69	Quebec Aces	AHL	70	12	13	25	24	15	4	5	9	6
1969–70	Philadelphia Flyers	NHL	66	9	10	19	19	—	—	—	—	—
1970–71	Philadelphia Flyers	NHL	78	5	7	12	25	4	0	0	0	2
1971–72	Richmond Robins	AHL	12	4	5	9	2	—	—	—	—	—
1971–72	Philadelphia Flyers	NHL	58	5	5	10	26	—	—	—	—	—
1972–73	Atlanta Flames	NHL	78	6	9	15	19	—	—	—	—	—
1973–74	Atlanta Flames	NHL	52	1	4	5	0	—	—	—	—	—
1974–75	Richmond Robins	AHL	9	7	4	11	8	—	—	—	—	—
1974–75	Washington Capitals	NHL	18	0	4	4	6	—	—	—	—	—
1974–75	Pittsburgh Penguins	NHL	52	7	5	12	4	9	0	0	0	0
1975–76	Pittsburgh Penguins	NHL	78	4	5	9	8	3	0	0	0	0
1976–77	Pittsburgh Penguins	NHL	76	2	1	3	0	1	0	0	0	0
1977–78	Pittsburgh Penguins	NHL	8	0	2	2	0	—	—	—	—	—
1977–78	Binghamton Dusters	AHL	65	6	14	20	6	—	—	—	—	—
NHL totals			564	39	52	91	107	17	0	0	0	2

Preceded by Serge Bernier	Philadelphia Flyers' first-round draft pick 1968	Succeeded by Bob Currier
