= Bob Currier =

Canadian ice hockey player (born 1949)

- Born: November 29, 1949 (age 76) Cornwall, Ontario, Canada
- Height: 6 ft 1 in (185 cm)
- Weight: 175 lb (79 kg; 12 st 7 lb)
- Position: Centre / Right Wing
- Shot: Right
- Played for: Quebec Aces; Richmond Robins; Seattle Totems; San Diego Gulls; Tulsa Oilers
- NHL draft: 6th overall, 1969; Philadelphia Flyers
- Playing career: 1969–1974

Robert Currier (born November 29, 1949) is a Canadian former professional ice hockey player who played primarily in the American Hockey League (AHL). After completing his junior career with the Cornwall Royals, he was drafted in the first round of the 1969 NHL Amateur Draft by the Philadelphia Flyers. Currier spent four seasons playing for the Flyers top minor league affiliate in the AHL, but he did not appear in a National Hockey League game.

== Career statistics ==
=== Regular season and playoffs ===
			Regular season					Playoffs
Season	Team	League	GP	G	A	Pts	PIM	GP	G	A	Pts	PIM
1968–69	Cornwall Royals	CJHL	—	—	—	—	—	—	—	—	—	—
1969–70	Quebec Aces	AHL	51	1	3	5	7	1	0	0	0	0
1970–71	Quebec Aces	AHL	67	20	8	28	44	1	1	0	1	0
1971–72	Seattle Totems	WHL	27	1	5	6	13	—	—	—	—	—
1971–72	Richmond Robins	AHL	13	1	0	1	2	—	—	—	—	—
1972–73	Richmond Robins	AHL	70	16	10	26	40	3	1	0	1	2
1973–74	San Diego Gulls	WHL	4	0	1	1	9	—	—	—	—	—
1973–74	Tulsa Oilers	CHL	22	7	4	11	22	—	—	—	—	—
AHL totals			201	38	22	60	93	5	2	0	2	2

Preceded by Lew Morrison	Philadelphia Flyers' first-round draft pick 1969	Succeeded by Larry Wright
