= Craig Berube =

Canadian ice hockey player and coach (born 1965)

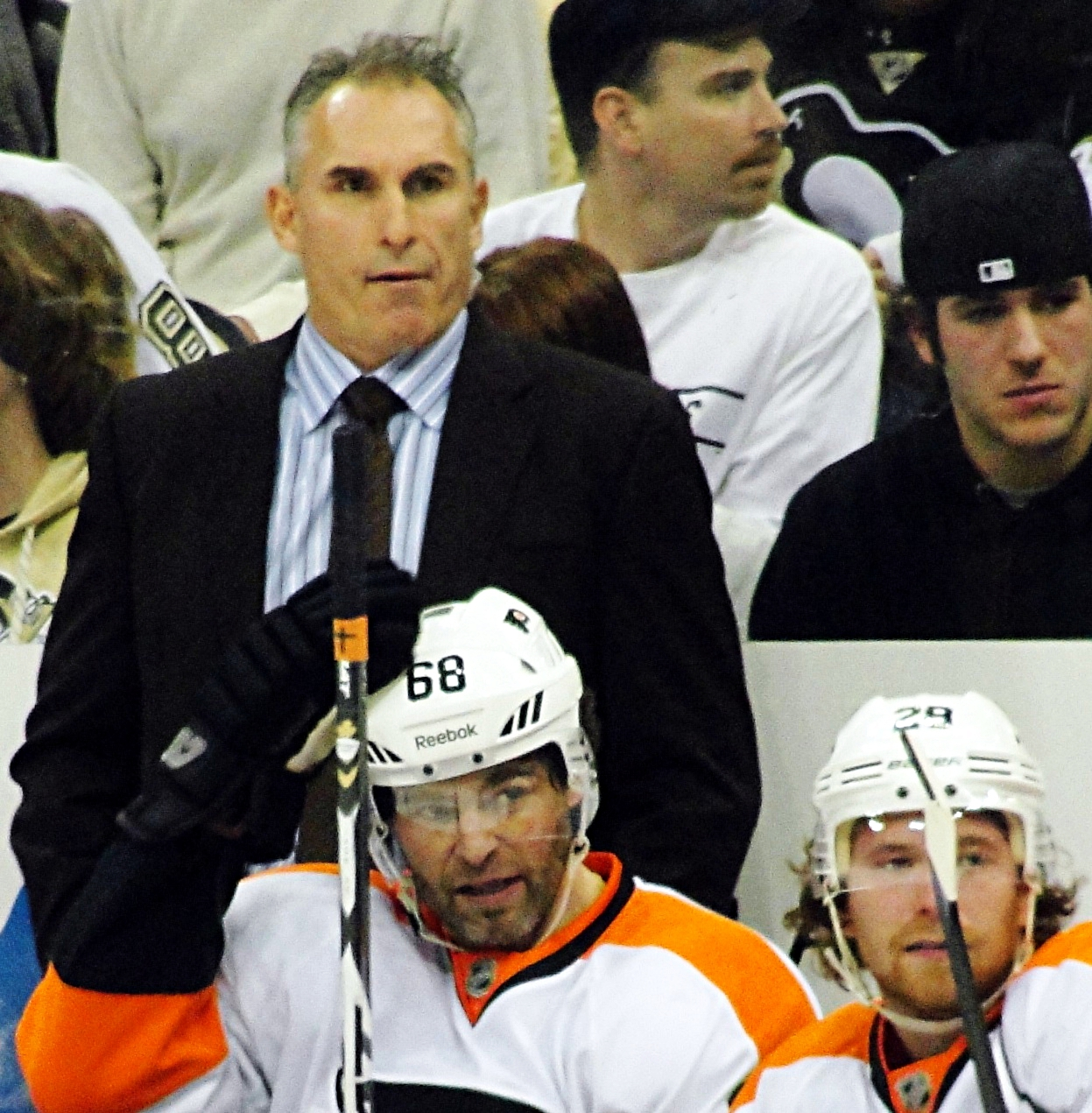
- Berube with the Philadelphia Flyers in 2011
- Born: December 17, 1965 (age 60) Calahoo, Alberta, Canada
- Height: 6 ft 1 in (185 cm)
- Weight: 205 lb (93 kg; 14 st 9 lb)
- Position: Left wing
- Shot: Left
- Played for: Philadelphia Flyers; Toronto Maple Leafs; Calgary Flames; Washington Capitals; New York Islanders
- Coached for: Philadelphia Flyers; St. Louis Blues; Toronto Maple Leafs
- NHL draft: Undrafted
- Playing career: 1986–2004
- Coaching career: 2004–present

Craig Berube (/bəˈruːbiː/; born December 17, 1965) is a Canadian professional ice hockey coach and former player who was most recently the head coach for the Toronto Maple Leafs of the National Hockey League (NHL). Nicknamed "Chief", Berube played 17 seasons in the NHL for the Philadelphia Flyers, Toronto Maple Leafs, Calgary Flames, Washington Capitals and New York Islanders. His role was primarily that of an enforcer. After retirement, Berube served as head coach of the Flyers for two seasons, and the St. Louis Blues for parts of six seasons, winning the Stanley Cup in 2019 as then-interim head coach. Berube additionally served as a national team scout for Canada at the 2016 World Cup of Hockey, under Blues general manager Doug Armstrong.

== Playing career ==
Berube played 1,054 NHL regular season games between 1986 and 2003. He was known as an enforcer in the NHL and amassed 3,149 penalty minutes in his career, good for seventh on the all-time list. Berube has the lowest point total (159) of any player with 1000 games played.

Berube was signed as an undrafted free agent by the Philadelphia Flyers on March 19, 1986. He made his NHL debut on March 22, 1987, recording 16 penalty minutes which included two fighting majors, in a 3–1 Flyers win over the Pittsburgh Penguins. He remained with the Flyers through the end of the regular season and also played in five playoff games during the Flyers' run to the 1987 Stanley Cup Final. Berube cemented his place in the Flyers' line-up during the 1988–89 season and finished in the top ten in penalty minutes during the next two seasons.

Following the 1990–91 season, Berube was traded three times in a span of a little over seven months, twice in the off-season. The Flyers traded him to the Edmonton Oilers along with Craig Fisher and Scott Mellanby for Dave Brown, Corey Foster, and Jari Kurri on May 30. Four months later he was traded to the Toronto Maple Leafs along with Glenn Anderson and Grant Fuhr for Vincent Damphousse, Peter Ing, Luke Richardson, and Scott Thornton on September 19. Berube played the first half of the 1991–92 season with Toronto before he was traded again on January 2, 1992 to the Calgary Flames along with Alexander Godynyuk, Gary Leeman, Michel Petit, and Jeff Reese for Doug Gilmour, Jamie Macoun, Kent Manderville, Ric Nattress, and Rick Wamsley.

Berube remained with the Flames through the end of the 1992–93 season. He was traded on June 26, 1993, to the Washington Capitals for a fifth-round draft choice in the 1993 NHL entry draft. He spent the next six seasons with the Capitals, notably playing in every playoff game during Washington's run to the 1998 Stanley Cup Final.

During a November 1997 game against the Florida Panthers, Berube called Panthers' forward Peter Worrell, who is black, "a monkey." Berube claimed the remark was not racially motivated and he apologized to Worrell a day after the game. The NHL suspended Berube for one game.

Berube returned to the Flyers in 1999 during the trade deadline. He saw his last Stanley Cup playoff action on the ice in 2000. In game four of the Eastern Conference finals, he scored the game-winning goal to put the Flyers up 3–1 in the series against the New Jersey Devils, but the Flyers lost the next three games and the series.

Berube split the next three seasons between the Capitals, New York Islanders, and the Flames. He ended his playing career as a player-assistant coach with the Philadelphia Phantoms, the Flyers American Hockey League affiliate, during the 2003–04 season.

== Coaching career ==
=== Philadelphia Flyers ===
Berube was named the head coach of the Philadelphia Phantoms, the Flyers' affiliate in the American Hockey League, before the 2006–07 AHL season. However, on October 23, 2006, Berube was promoted to the Flyers' NHL coaching staff after a major reorganization in the franchise. On October 22, 2006, Bob Clarke resigned from his position as general manager of the Flyers, and head coach Ken Hitchcock was released from his duties. John Stevens, formerly assistant coach, was named the Flyers' new head coach, and Berube was designated to replace him. For the 2007–08 season, Berube returned to the Phantoms as head coach. On October 7, 2013, Berube was named head coach of the Philadelphia Flyers following an 0–3–0 start. The team improved their play following the change to Berube and clinched a spot in the 2014 NHL playoffs. On April 17, 2015, Berube was relieved of his coaching duties by Flyers general manager Ron Hextall.

=== St. Louis Blues ===
On June 29, 2016, Berube was named the head coach of the Chicago Wolves in the American Hockey League, the affiliate of the St. Louis Blues.

On June 15, 2017, Berube was named an assistant head coach for the Blues. On November 19, 2018, the Blues fired head coach Mike Yeo and named Berube interim coach for the rest of the season.

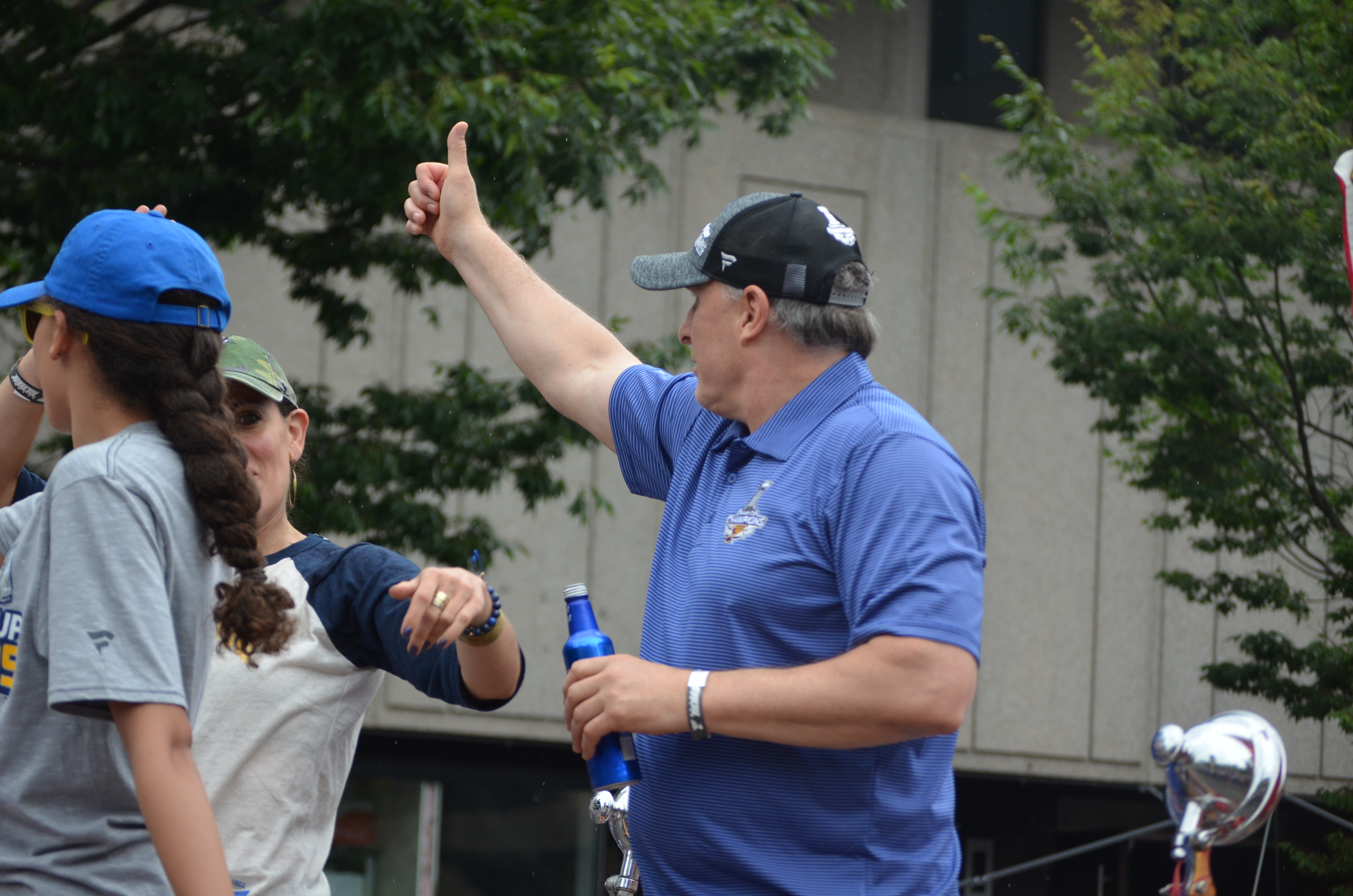
Berube during the 2019 Stanley Cup parade

The Blues struggled at first under Berube's watch; at the start of the 2019 calendar year, they were 15–18–4 and last in the league standings. However, they improved through the remainder of the season, going 30–10–5, including a franchise-record 11-game winning streak. As the third seed in the Central Division, they advanced to the Stanley Cup Final for the fourth time in franchise history, and the first time since 1970. The Blues won the series 4–3 over the Boston Bruins, capping off Game 7 with a 4–1 win, earning the Blues their first Stanley Cup title in franchise history and Berube his first Stanley Cup championship as a player or coach.

On April 26, 2019, Berube, Jon Cooper, and Barry Trotz were announced as the finalists for the Jack Adams Award. On June 24, the Blues dropped the "interim" tag from Berube's title and officially named him as the 26th head coach in franchise history, with a three-year contract.

On February 9, 2022, the Blues signed Berube to a three-year contract extension, through the 2024–25 season.

On December 12, 2023, following a four-game losing streak capped by a 6–4 loss to the Detroit Red Wings, Berube was fired by the Blues.

=== Toronto Maple Leafs ===
Following the 2023–24 season, Berube was hired as head coach of the Toronto Maple Leafs on May 17, 2024, replacing Sheldon Keefe. In his first season with the Maple Leafs in 2024–25, the team did exceptionally well in the regular season winning the Atlantic Division for the first time with a record of 52–26–4. In the 2025 playoffs, Toronto defeated the Ottawa Senators in the first round in six games, and then lost to the Florida Panthers in a seven-game series in the second round. On May 13, 2026, Toronto fired Berube after the team finished the 2025–26 season with a 32–36–14 record and missed the playoffs.

== Personal life ==
Berube is of Métis and Cree descent. During his time coaching the Flyers, he and Buffalo Sabres head coach Ted Nolan (Ojibwe) were the only head coaches in the NHL with First Nations ancestry, and on November 21, 2013, they became the first Indigenous head coaches to coach for opposing teams in the same game.

== Career statistics ==
			Regular season					Playoffs
Season	Team	League	GP	G	A	Pts	PIM	GP	G	A	Pts	PIM
1982–83	Williams Lake Mustangs	PCJHL	33	9	24	33	99	—	—	—	—	—
1982–83	Kamloops Jr. Oilers	WHL	4	0	0	0	0	—	—	—	—	—
1983–84	New Westminster Bruins	WHL	70	11	20	31	104	8	1	2	3	5
1984–85	New Westminster Bruins	WHL	70	25	44	69	191	10	3	2	5	4
1985–86	Kamloops Blazers	WHL	32	17	14	31	119	—	—	—	—	—
1985–86	Medicine Hat Tigers	WHL	34	14	16	30	95	25	7	8	15	102
1986–87	Hershey Bears	AHL	63	7	17	24	325	—	—	—	—	—
1986–87	Philadelphia Flyers	NHL	7	0	0	0	57	5	0	0	0	17
1987–88	Philadelphia Flyers	NHL	27	3	2	5	108	—	—	—	—	—
1987–88	Hershey Bears	AHL	31	5	9	14	119	—	—	—	—	—
1988–89	Philadelphia Flyers	NHL	53	1	1	2	199	16	0	0	0	56
1988–89	Hershey Bears	AHL	7	0	2	2	19	—	—	—	—	—
1989–90	Philadelphia Flyers	NHL	74	4	14	18	291	—	—	—	—	—
1990–91	Philadelphia Flyers	NHL	74	8	9	17	293	—	—	—	—	—
1991–92	Toronto Maple Leafs	NHL	40	5	7	12	109	—	—	—	—	—
1991–92	Calgary Flames	NHL	36	1	4	5	155	—	—	—	—	—
1992–93	Calgary Flames	NHL	77	4	8	12	209	6	0	1	1	21
1993–94	Washington Capitals	NHL	84	7	7	14	305	8	0	0	0	21
1994–95	Washington Capitals	NHL	43	2	4	6	173	7	0	0	0	29
1995–96	Washington Capitals	NHL	50	2	10	12	151	2	0	0	0	19
1996–97	Washington Capitals	NHL	80	4	3	7	218	—	—	—	—	—
1997–98	Washington Capitals	NHL	74	6	9	15	189	21	1	0	1	21
1998–99	Washington Capitals	NHL	66	5	4	9	166	—	—	—	—	—
1998–99	Philadelphia Flyers	NHL	11	0	0	0	28	6	1	0	1	4
1999–00	Philadelphia Flyers	NHL	77	4	8	12	162	18	1	0	1	23
2000–01	Washington Capitals	NHL	22	0	1	1	18	—	—	—	—	—
2000–01	New York Islanders	NHL	38	0	2	2	54	—	—	—	—	—
2001–02	Calgary Flames	NHL	66	3	1	4	164	—	—	—	—	—
2002–03	Calgary Flames	NHL	55	2	4	6	100	—	—	—	—	—
2003–04	Philadelphia Phantoms	AHL	33	0	6	6	134	—	—	—	—	—
NHL totals			1,054	61	98	159	3,149	89	3	1	4	211

== Head coaching record ==
Team	Year	Regular season						Postseason			
Team	Year	G	W	L	OTL	Pts	Finish	W	L	Win%	Result
PHI	2013–14	79	42	27	10	(94)	3rd in Metropolitan	3	4	.429	Lost in first round (NYR)
PHI	2014–15	82	33	31	18	84	6th in Metropolitan	—	—	—	Missed playoffs
PHI total		161	75	58	28			3	4	.429	1 playoff appearance
STL	2018–19	63	38	19	6	(82)	3rd in Central	16	10	.615	Won Stanley Cup (BOS)
STL	2019–20	71 (Note: Season shortened due to the COVID-19 pandemic during the 2019–20 season. Playoffs were played in August 2020 with a different format.)	42	19	10	94	1st in Central	2	4	.333	Lost in first round (VAN)
STL	2020–21	56	27	20	9	63	4th in West	0	4	.000	Lost in first round (COL)
STL	2021–22	82	49	22	11	109	3rd in Central	6	6	.500	Lost in second round (COL)
STL	2022–23	82	37	38	7	81	6th in Central	—	—	—	Missed playoffs
STL	2023–24	28	13	14	1	27	(fired)	—	—	—	—
STL total		382	206	132	44			24	24	.500	4 playoff appearances 1 Stanley Cup title
TOR	2024–25	82	52	26	4	108	1st in Atlantic	7	6	.538	Lost in second round (FLA)
TOR	2025–26	82	32	36	14	78	8th in Atlantic	—	—	—	Missed playoffs
TOR total		164	84	62	18			7	6	.538	1 playoff appearance
Total		707	365	252	90			34	34	.500	6 playoff appearances 1 Stanley Cup title

== See also ==
- List of NHL players with 1,000 games played
- List of NHL players with 2,000 career penalty minutes

== Notes ==
Sporting positions
Preceded by Peter Laviolette	Head coach of the Philadelphia Flyers; 2013–2015	Succeeded by Dave Hakstol
Preceded by Mike Yeo	Head coach of the St. Louis Blues; 2018–2023	Succeeded by Drew Bannister
Preceded by Sheldon Keefe	Head coach of the Toronto Maple Leafs; 2024–2026	Succeeded by Jim Hiller
