= Russ Farwell =

- Born: April 20, 1956 (age 70); Peace River, Alberta, Canada
- Occupations: Former general manager of the Philadelphia Flyers (1990-94); Former owner and governor of the Seattle Thunderbirds, Current VP Hockey Operations of the Seattle Thunderbirds

Russ Farwell (born April 20, 1956) was the owner, governor, and general manager and is the current vice president of hockey operations for the Seattle Thunderbirds of the Western Hockey League.

He is known for his stint as general manager of the Philadelphia Flyers from 1990 to 1994, during which he made a blockbuster trade with the Quebec Nordiques to acquire the rights to Eric Lindros in a package including two draft picks and several players, notably Hockey Hall of Fame center Peter Forsberg.

However, the Flyers did not qualify for the playoffs during any year Farwell was general manager posting a record of 136 wins, 150 losses, and 42 ties.

Farwell sold the Seattle Thunderbirds to a Canadian ownership group led by Dan and Lindsey Leckelt on October 4, 2017, staying on as general manage at that time. In 2018, he was named vice president of hockey operations for the Thunderbirds.

Preceded by Bob Clarke	General Manager of the Philadelphia Flyers; 1990–94	Succeeded by Bob Clarke
