= Bobby Clarke =

Canadian ice hockey player (born 1949)

OC Bobby Clarke
- Hockey Hall of Fame, 1987
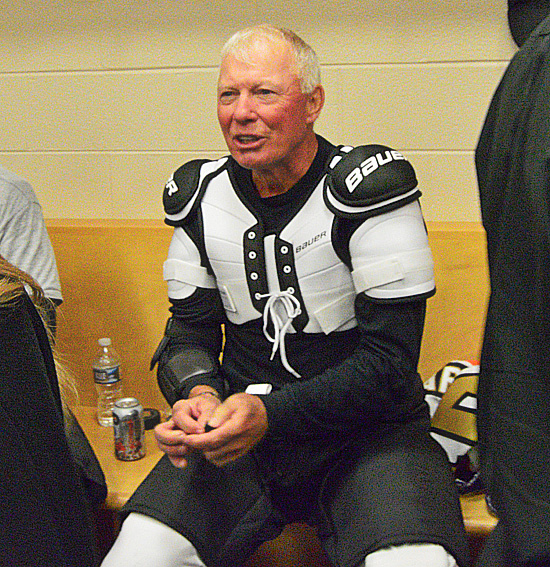
- Clarke in 2017
- Born: August 13, 1949 (age 77) Flin Flon, Manitoba, Canada
- Height: 5 ft 10 in (178 cm)
- Weight: 176 lb (80 kg; 12 st 8 lb)
- Position: Centre
- Shot: Left
- Played for: Philadelphia Flyers
- National team: Canada
- NHL draft: 17th overall, 1969; Philadelphia Flyers
- Playing career: 1969–1984
Medal record
Representing Canada
Ice hockey
Canada Cup
Gold medal – first place	1976 Canada	Ice Hockey
World Championships
Bronze medal – third place	1982 Finland	Ice Hockey

Robert Earle Clarke OC (born August 13, 1949) is a Canadian former professional ice hockey centre who played his entire 15-year National Hockey League (NHL) career with the Philadelphia Flyers and is currently an executive with the team. Clarke is acknowledged by some as being one of the greatest hockey players and captains of all time. He was captain of the Flyers from 1973 to 1979, winning the Stanley Cup with them in both 1974 and 1975. He was again captain of the Flyers from 1982 to 1984 before retiring. Clarke had three 100-point seasons, twice leading the league in assists, and was selected to play in nine NHL All-Star Games. He also won the Frank J. Selke Trophy in 1983, as the league's best defensive forward. A three-time Hart Trophy winner and 1987 Hockey Hall of Fame inductee, Clarke was rated number 24 on The Hockey News' list of The Top 100 NHL Players of All-Time in 1998. In 2017, Clarke was named one of the "100 Greatest NHL Players" in history.

Upon retiring at the end of the 1983–84 season with 358 goals and 852 assists for a total of 1,210 points in 1,144 career games, he immediately became general manager of the Flyers. He spent 19 of the following 23 seasons as a general manager of the Flyers, also briefly serving as general manager of the Minnesota North Stars and Florida Panthers, reaching the Stanley Cup Final three times with the Flyers and once with Minnesota. His time as an NHL general manager had its share of controversy, perhaps none greater than the rift between him and star player Eric Lindros during the late 1990s and early 2000s. He resigned from the general manager position less than a month into the 2006–07 season and is currently the Flyers' senior vice president.

== Early life ==
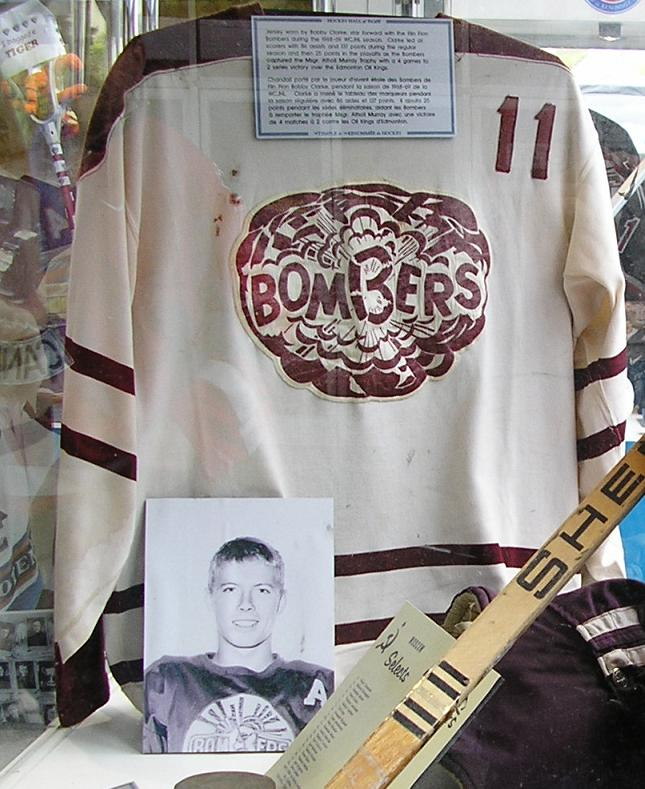
Bobby Clarke's Bombers jersey on display at the 2007 Memorial Cup in Vancouver.

Born in the small northern Manitoban mining town of Flin Flon, Clarke began playing organized hockey when he was eight years old. Around the time he was 12 or 13 years old, he learned he had type 1 diabetes. Even though he progressed into a highly touted prospect playing for the Flin Flon Bombers, leading the league in which the Bombers played in scoring in each of his last three years of junior hockey, NHL teams feared Clarke would never be able to play in the NHL because of his diabetes. Bombers coach Pat Ginnell took Clarke to the Mayo Clinic in Minnesota following the 1967–68 season and the doctors concluded that as long as he took care of himself he could play professionally. Ginnell asked the doctors to write that statement down and when NHL scouts came to watch the Bombers play during the 1968–69 season, Ginnell showed them the doctor's verdict.

Even with such assurances Clarke fell to the second round of the 1969 NHL Amateur Draft and was finally selected by the Philadelphia Flyers 17th overall. After Gerry Melnyk, a scout and administrative assistant with the Flyers, tried to convince general manager Bud Poile to draft Clarke with their first-round pick and failed — Poile drafted Bob Currier instead, a player who retired five years later and, ironically, never played a game in the NHL — Melnyk called a diabetes specialist in Philadelphia who said Clarke would be fine if he looked after his health. Melnyk then successfully convinced Poile to draft Clarke when the Flyers second-round pick came around. The Detroit Red Wings and Montreal Canadiens immediately offered the Flyers a deal for Clarke, Detroit offering two veteran players and Montreal offering a deal "Flyers management could hardly refuse." The Flyers refused both offers and made it clear Clarke was not for sale.

== NHL career ==
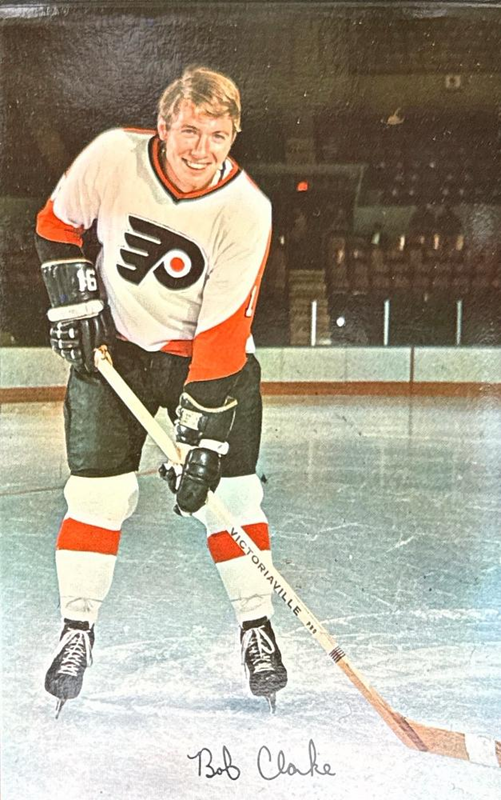
1970 postcard of Clarke for Philadelphia Flyers

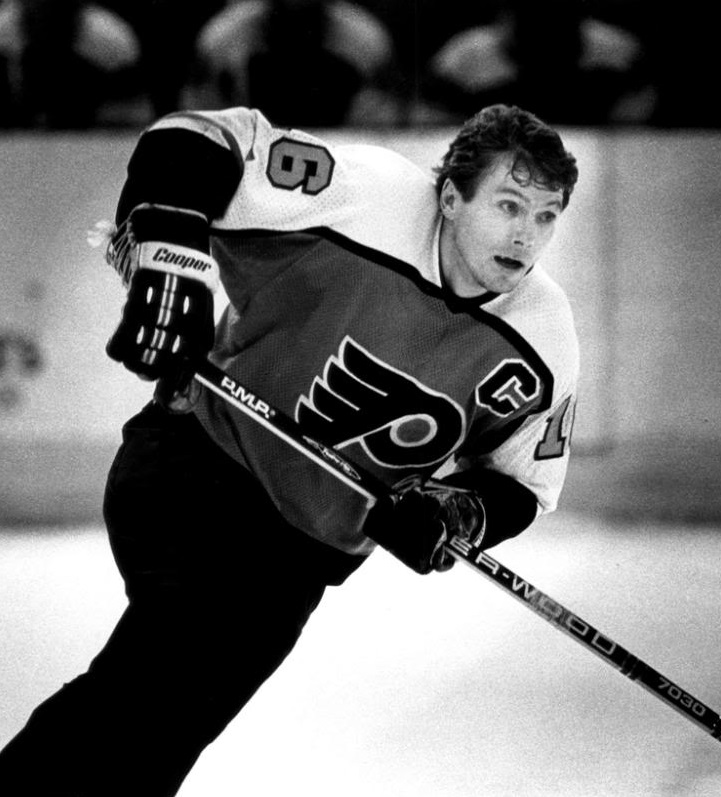
Clarke playing for Philadelphia Flyers in 1983

Wearing #16, Clarke made his NHL debut on October 11, 1969, against the Minnesota North Stars. He recorded his first point on October 22 against the Toronto Maple Leafs, an assist on Lew Morrison's 3rd period goal, and he scored his first goal on October 30 against the New York Rangers, beating Rangers goaltender Ed Giacomin 16:36 into the 3rd period. Clarke played the entire 76-game schedule his rookie season and recorded 46 points (15 goals, 31 assists) while earning a trip to the NHL All-Star Game. He was also named NHL Rookie of the Year by The Sporting News, and finished fourth in voting for the Calder Memorial Trophy. Clarke led the Flyers in scoring during his sophomore season, 1970–71, with 27 goals and 36 assists for a total of 63 points in 77 games. His efforts helped the Flyers make the playoffs, but Clarke was held scoreless in his first playoff action and the Flyers lost in four games to the Chicago Black Hawks.

A tooth abscess was the cause of a slow start to the 1971–72 season; 20 pounds underweight, Clarke only managed 5 goals and 11 assists 31 games into the season. He rebounded over the final 47 games, scoring 30 goals and 35 assists and bringing his totals to 35 goals and 46 assists. His dedication was rewarded when he became the first Flyer to win a major NHL award, the Bill Masterton Memorial Trophy, and the Flyers re-signed him to a five-year contract worth $100,000 per season, a raise of $75,000 per season.

A few months following his strong play during the Summit Series for Team Canada, Clarke was named the Flyers' captain at age 23, the youngest to ever assume that role in NHL history at the time. As leader of the brawling Broad Street Bullies, Clarke became the first player from an expansion team to score more than 100 points in a season, 104 points (37 goals, 67 assists) total. Facing the Minnesota North Stars in the first round, the Flyers and Clarke received a scare, as he was hit in the eye with a stick which broke his contact lens and was rushed to the hospital. After removing parts of his broken contact from under the eye, Clarke returned to the lineup the next game despite having suffered a scratched cornea, and the Flyers won their first playoff series. The Flyers lost to the Montreal Canadiens during the next round, but Clarke was later awarded the Hart Memorial Trophy as the league's MVP and the Lester B. Pearson Award as the league's most outstanding player as voted by the league's players.

Clarke's production fell to 87 points in 77 games during the 1973–74 regular season, but his leadership and Bernie Parent's stellar goaltending led the Flyers to the second-best record in the league and to the Stanley Cup Finals to play the team with the best record, the Boston Bruins. After losing Game 1, Clarke scored arguably the biggest goal of his career in overtime of Game 2, putting a rebound shot in over Bruins goaltender Gilles Gilbert. The Flyers won three of the next four games and became the first expansion team to win the Stanley Cup. Clarke played a key role in the Finals in countering Bruins' star players, winning 48 of the 66 face-offs against Phil Esposito, and neutralizing Bobby Orr by chasing him down. The Stanley Cup winning goal in game six was scored after a fight between Clarke and Orr that sent both players to the penalty box.

Clarke set the NHL record, at the time, for most assists by a centreman with 89 during the 1974–75 season on his way to a 116-point season. He finished second in the league in plus-minus rating with a plus 79, which illustrates his strong two-way play. The Flyers returned to the Stanley Cup Final and defeated the Buffalo Sabres in six games, repeating as Stanley Cup champions. Following the Flyers' victory, a widely circulated photograph captured Clarke smiling and embracing the Stanley Cup. In addition to the second championship, Clarke was awarded the Hart Trophy for the second time, while being voted to the league's First All-Star Team.

1975–76 was a record-breaking season for Clarke. Playing on the LCB line with Reggie Leach and Bill Barber, the trio set a record for most goals by a line with 141. He also tied his mark of the previous season with 89 assists and set a personal best and franchise record for most points in a single season with 119 (later broken by Mark Recchi in 1992–93). He also led the league in plus-minus rating with a plus 83. The Flyers, without Parent and Rick MacLeish, made their third straight Finals appearance. However, Montreal coach Scotty Bowman's strategy successfully prevented Clarke's line from scoring and the Flyers were swept in four straight games. Clarke was awarded his third Hart Trophy and named to the NHL First All-Star team. Clarke's production would drop off over the next few seasons; in fact, his point total fell six seasons in a row. But the Flyers remained contenders, reaching the semifinals and losing to Boston in 1976–77 and 1977–78.

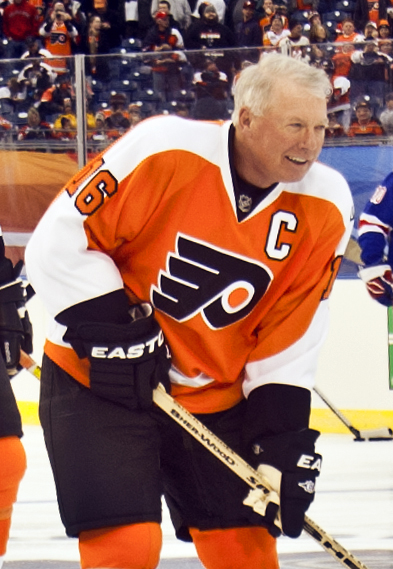
Clarke pictured during the Alumni game for the 2012 NHL Winter Classic on December 31, 2011.

After a quarterfinal loss to the Rangers in 1978–79, Clarke was named an assistant coach. In order to become an assistant, he had to give up the captaincy due to NHL rules, so Mel Bridgman was named the 4th captain in Flyers history. His first season as a playing assistant coach, 1979–80, saw the Flyers go on an undefeated streak of 35 games, not only the longest in NHL history, but also the longest in North American professional sports history. The Flyers made it to the Stanley Cup Finals before losing to the New York Islanders in six games. During the playoffs, Clarke scored 8 goals and assisted on 12 others in 19 games, all 8 goals coming on the power play. Following the playoffs, Clarke was awarded the Lester Patrick Trophy along with Flyers owner Ed Snider and former Flyers coach Fred Shero.

Clarke wore the number 16 throughout his entire NHL career except for two games during the 1980–81 season. Prior to a road game on February 27, 1981, Clarke's jersey was stolen. Clarke wore the only other jersey available, number 36, in the next two games. A month later, Clarke hit a personal milestone in memorable fashion. On March 19 during a game against the Boston Bruins, a Reggie Leach slapshot struck Clarke. After leaving the ice, he re-appeared moments later stitched up and with his jersey covered in blood. 31 seconds into the third period Clarke beat Bruins goalie Marco Baron for his 19th goal of the season and his 1000th career point.

Despite his diabetes and hard-nosed play, Clarke proved to be remarkably durable. A broken foot suffered during the 1981–82 season limited him to 62 games, the only time in his career he played fewer than 70 games in a season. No longer an assistant coach, Clarke reassumed the captaincy from Bill Barber during 1982–83. He skated in his 1,000th career game on October 23, 1982, against the Pittsburgh Penguins. Clarke had his best season since 1977–78, scoring 85 points in 80 games. He also won the Frank J. Selke Trophy, given annually to the league's best defensive forward. After the Flyers were eliminated from the playoffs in the first round for the third straight season in 1983–84 and the general manager position opened up after Bob McCammon resigned, Clarke retired on May 15, 1984, to become the general manager of the Flyers.

On January 14, 2017, Clarke played in the Flyers' 50th anniversary alumni game against the alumni of the Pittsburgh Penguins, where he combined with his longtime linemates, Bill Barber and Reggie Leach, which ended in a 3–3 tie before a sold-out crowd of over 19,000 at the Wells Fargo Center. Prior to the game Clarke announced that it would be his last alumni game.

== International play ==
Clarke played for Team Canada three times during his career. He played a major role in defeating the Soviet Union during the Summit Series in 1972, captained the Canadian team to gold at the 1976 Canada Cup, and won a bronze medal at the 1982 World Championships. In addition, he led the Flyers to the only victory over the Soviet Union's best team, Soviet Red Army, during the 1976 Super Series, and took part in the 1979 Challenge Cup with the NHL All-Stars. After his playing career, he served as one of Canada's four general managers during the 1987 and 1991 Canada Cups and served as Canada's lone general manager during the 1998 Winter Olympics.

=== Summit Series ===
Coming off his third NHL season, Clarke was the last player Team Canada selected to play in the Summit Series. His line with Ron Ellis and Paul Henderson turned out to be Canada's best during the series, Clarke tallying two goals and four assists in the eight-game series won by Canada as well as being awarded Team Canada MVP in game one of the series. Clarke's play earned the respect of many during the series, Henderson saying, "The best thing that could have happened to Ronnie (Ellis) and me was to get this young kid making plays for us. He was terrific!" Wayne Cashman would add, "There were guys on Team Canada who took their game to new heights in that series. A perfect example would be Bobby Clarke." The Soviet team's assistant coach, Boris Kulagin, thought Clarke was Canada's best player. Clarke's strong play was largely attributed to the fact that, unlike many of the Canadian players, Clarke reported to training camp in top physical condition, as he had always followed a strict off-season training regimen. Though he earned much praise due to his play, he was also criticized for an incident during the sixth game which is often referred to as, "The Slash".

Clarke's line played against the line of the Soviets' top player, Valeri Kharlamov, during the entire series. After being on the receiving end of some stick work from Kharlamov while going for the puck, Clarke caught up with Kharlamov and laid a two-handed slash across his ankle, breaking it in the process. Though Kharlamov finished the game, he missed the seventh game and was largely ineffective in the eighth. The notorious incident is depicted in the Russian film Legend No. 17, a dramatization of the career of Valeri Kharlamov including the Summit Series. When asked about the slash years later, Clarke said, "If I hadn't learned to lay on a two-hander once in a while, I'd never have left Flin Flon." 30 years after the series, Henderson criticized Clarke, calling the slash, "the low point of the series." Clarke responded saying that he thought it was "improper to criticize a teammate thirty years later," and that he did not "understand why he would bring it up now." Henderson has since retracted his criticism. Kharlamov, prior to his death in 1981, said he thought Clarke was tasked with "taking me out of the game." John Ferguson, Sr., an assistant coach with Team Canada in 1972, said, "I called Clarke over to the bench, looked over at Kharlamov and said, 'I think he needs a tap on the ankle.' I didn't think twice about it. It was us versus them. And Kharlamov was killing us. I mean, somebody had to do it. And I sure wasn't going to ask Henderson." Clarke, however, does not recall Ferguson telling him this.

On their trip home from the Summit Series, Team Canada played a friendly match in Prague against the team of Czechoslovakia. At the end of the second period, during which the Canadians lost their 2–0 lead, Clarke hit Czechoslovak defender František Pospíšil in the face with a butt-end of his stick almost striking Pospíšil's eye.

=== Nagano Olympics ===
Named general manager of Team Canada on January 30, 1997, Clarke was tasked with picking which NHLers would compete for Canada at the 1998 Winter Olympics in Nagano, the first time NHLers would compete in the Olympics. A few of Clarke's choices were the source of some consternation, in particular omitting Mark Messier in favour of surprise selection Rob Zamuner and choosing 24-year-old Eric Lindros as the team's captain over the likes of Wayne Gretzky, Ray Bourque, and Steve Yzerman. Ranked number one going into the tournament, Team Canada played strongly until being stymied by Czech goaltender Dominik Hašek in the semifinals, losing in a shootout. They then lost 3–2 to Finland in the bronze medal match.

== NHL management ==
Following his retirement, Clarke's first stint as Flyers general manager lasted six seasons and included two trips to the Stanley Cup Finals in 1985 and 1987. After making the playoffs in each of his first five seasons in the front office, the Flyers fell off during the 1989–90 season and missed the playoffs, resulting in his firing by Flyers President Jay Snider.

Clarke moved on to the Minnesota North Stars and spent two seasons as the North Stars general manager, one of which saw a surprise run to the Finals in 1991.

Leaving Minnesota, Clarke returned to Philadelphia to assume the role of Senior Vice President during the 1992–93 season, and served as a mentor for young phenom Eric Lindros during his first season. Clarke moved on shortly after and took the general manager position with the expansion Florida Panthers, a team that set the expansion team record for wins and points during a season in 1993–94. He returned to the role of Flyers general manager prior to the 1994–95 season (Florida was compensated with cash and Philadelphia's second-round draft pick in the 1994 NHL entry draft), and he rebuilt the team into a Cup contender. During his second tenure as general manager of the Flyers, the team made the playoffs 11 seasons in a row but reached the Final only once (1997). Following a poor start to the 2006–07 season, Clarke resigned citing a possible burnout and a lack of desire. Clarke returned to the franchise on December 4, 2006, and was named Senior Vice President.

=== Controversy and criticism ===
Clarke failed to win the Stanley Cup over the 22 seasons he was a general manager with Philadelphia, Minnesota, and Florida. During his 19 seasons as Flyers manager over two stints, the Flyers reached the Stanley Cup Final three times and amassed a regular-season record of 714–443–199, but for one reason or another always came up short of a Cup title. Clarke's Flyers in 1985 and 1987 were considered underdogs to the powerhouse Edmonton Oilers, as were his North Stars to the Pittsburgh Penguins in 1991. In his second tenure as Flyers manager, the team lost in the postseason, frequently to lower-seeded teams. While goaltending was a strength during his first tenure with two Vezina Trophy winners between the pipes (Pelle Lindbergh and Ron Hextall), only Hextall in 1995, a combination of Hextall and Garth Snow in 1997, Brian Boucher in 2000, and Robert Esche in 2004 got the Flyers past the second round of the playoffs during his second stint. By contrast, the New Jersey Devils, their Atlantic Division rivals, were stable in net with Martin Brodeur and beat the Flyers in the Conference Finals en route to Stanley Cups in 1995 and 2000.

Clarke received his harshest criticism after first-round playoff exits, including a string of four in five years from 1998 to 2002, and several coaching changes. After Terry Murray was fired following the team's sweep in the 1997 Stanley Cup Finals (some suggested that Murray lost the players' respect by describing the 6–1 loss in game three as a "choking situation"), five more coaching changes were made in the next five years. Wayne Cashman, Murray's replacement, was replaced three-quarters of the way through the 1997–98, by Roger Neilson due to inconsistent team play. Some suggested Clarke's handling of Neilson, who took a medical leave in February 2000 to undergo cancer treatment and was replaced by Craig Ramsay, was disrespectful. Clarke explained "The Neilson situation - Roger got cancer - that wasn't our fault. We didn't tell him to go get cancer. It's too bad that he did. We feel sorry for him, but then he went goofy on us." Ramsay guided the team to the Eastern Conference Finals in 2000, but he was fired after a subpar start in 2000–01, being replaced by Clarke's former linemate Bill Barber. Barber was named coach of the year for 2000–01; however, under his watch the Flyers suffered two consecutive first-round eliminations, as their 2001 playoffs ended with an 8–0 defeat to Buffalo in Game Six, and their offense was held to just two goals by Ottawa during the 2002 playoffs, and this led to calls for Clarke's dismissal after he fired Barber. Clarke hired Ken Hitchcock as head coach for the 2002–03 season and Hitchcock remained until Clarke's resignation four years later, guiding the team to the 2004 conference finals.

Following the 2004–05 NHL lockout, Clarke signed 6'5" defencemen Derian Hatcher and Mike Rathje to four-year and five-year contracts respectively. While the moves were initially praised and even led some to label the Flyers Cup favorites in 2005–06, some suggested Clarke could not compete in the new NHL after the team was eliminated in the first round of the playoffs by Buffalo, a smaller, quicker team that proved to be effective against such slower defencemen as Hatcher and Rathje. Such criticisms became louder after a poor start to the following season which led to his resignation.

==== Eric Lindros ====
Nothing was more controversial during Clarke's time as a general manager than his dispute with Eric Lindros and his parents, particularly his father Carl who was Eric's agent. The trouble started following the 1997–98 season while negotiating a new contract for Lindros. Clarke threatened to trade him, saying, "If you want to be the highest-paid player in the game or close to it, you've got to play that way." While Lindros was not traded and he played well during the 1998–99 season, his season was cut short after sustaining a collapsed lung during a game on April 1 against the Nashville Predators. Lindros' parents criticized team trainer John Worley and claimed Clarke tried to kill their son by trying to put him on a plane back to Philadelphia, which would have been fatal given his condition.

After Lindros criticized Worley in March 2000 for failing to diagnose a concussion (his second of the season), Clarke stripped Lindros of the role of team captain. A few weeks after suffering a third concussion during practice, Lindros returned to the Flyers lineup for Game 6 of the Eastern Conference Finals and sustained his fourth concussion of the season (his sixth in 27 months) during Game 7. Afterwards, Clarke said he did not dislike Lindros, but he had a problem with his parents, saying, "If he's going to come back, he can't have his dad calling us and telling us who to trade for and who he wants to play with Eric and who can't play with Eric." Lindros never played for the Flyers again, as he rejected the Flyers qualifying offer in the off-season and sat out the 2000–01 season. Lindros pushed for a trade to Toronto but that move fell apart at the last minute when Clarke and Leafs manager Pat Quinn could not agree on terms. Clarke finally traded Lindros to the New York Rangers in August 2001. Following the trade, Clarke said, "I don't give a crap whether he ever plays again or if I ever see him again. All he ever did was cause aggravation to our team."

Upon Lindros' retirement in November 2007, Clarke stated that Lindros belonged in the Hockey Hall of Fame. "Yes, based on his ability to play the game and based on his contributions as a player, I think you have to separate all the crap that went on. Particularly when he played for the Flyers, it was just outstanding, dominant hockey — the first of the huge, big men with small man's skill."

Lindros and Clarke both played for the Philadelphia Flyers Alumni during the 2012 Winter Classic Alumni Game on December 31, 2011. The opposing team was the New York Rangers Alumni. Both men acknowledged the game as an opportunity to mend fences.

(T)his Alumni Game has provided an opportunity to rebuild ... once-burnt bridges. In recent years, Clarke has stated multiple times that he believes Lindros belongs in the Hall of Fame, and Lindros has acknowledged his many disagreements with Clarke and expressed a desire to move on.

== Personal life ==
Clarke and his family have been long-time residents of South Jersey. When first playing with the Flyers, Clarke lived in Mount Ephraim, New Jersey, later moving to Cherry Hill, New Jersey, then to Moorestown and in Haddonfield when he returned to the area after working in Minnesota and Florida.

Bobby Clarke remained close friends with NHLPA head Alan Eagleson even after Eagleson was indicted for (and subsequently found guilty of) fraud and embezzlement.

Clarke and his wife, Sandy, have four children, sons Wade and Lucas and daughters Jody and Jakki. They live in Ocean City, New Jersey.

== Career statistics ==
=== Regular season and playoffs ===
			Regular season					Playoffs
Season	Team	League	GP	G	A	Pts	PIM	GP	G	A	Pts	PIM
1965–66	Flin Flon Bombers	SJHL	4	4	3	7	0	—	—	—	—	—
1966–67	Flin Flon Bombers	MJHL	45	71	112	183	123	14	10	18	28	51
1966–67	Flin Flon Bombers	MC	—	—	—	—	—	6	2	5	7	49
1967–68	Flin Flon Bombers	WCHL	59	51	117	168	148	15	4	10	14	2
1968–69	Flin Flon Bombers	WCHL	58	51	86	137	123	18	9	16	25	0
1969–70	Philadelphia Flyers	NHL	76	15	31	46	68	—	—	—	—	—
1970–71	Philadelphia Flyers	NHL	77	27	36	63	78	4	0	0	0	2
1971–72	Philadelphia Flyers	NHL	78	35	46	81	87	—	—	—	—	—
1972–73	Philadelphia Flyers	NHL	78	37	67	104	80	11	2	6	8	6
1973–74	Philadelphia Flyers	NHL	77	35	52	87	113	17	5	11	16	42
1974–75	Philadelphia Flyers	NHL	80	27	89	116	125	17	4	12	16	16
1975–76	Philadelphia Flyers	NHL	76	30	89	119	136	16	2	14	16	28
1976–77	Philadelphia Flyers	NHL	80	27	63	90	71	10	5	5	10	8
1977–78	Philadelphia Flyers	NHL	71	21	68	89	83	12	4	7	11	8
1978–79	Philadelphia Flyers	NHL	80	16	57	73	68	8	2	4	6	8
1979–80	Philadelphia Flyers	NHL	76	12	57	69	65	19	8	12	20	16
1980–81	Philadelphia Flyers	NHL	80	19	46	65	140	12	3	3	6	6
1981–82	Philadelphia Flyers	NHL	62	17	46	63	154	4	4	2	6	4
1982–83	Philadelphia Flyers	NHL	80	23	62	85	115	3	1	0	1	2
1983–84	Philadelphia Flyers	NHL	73	17	43	60	70	3	2	1	3	6
NHL totals			1,144	358	852	1,210	1,453	136	42	77	119	152

=== International ===
Year	Team	Event	GP	G	A	Pts	PIM
1972	Canada	SS	8	2	4	6	18
1976	Canada	CC	6	1	2	3	0
1982	Canada	WC	9	0	1	1	6
Senior totals			23	3	7	10	24

=== All-Star Games ===
Year	Location	GP	G	A	P
1970	St. Louis Arena		0	0	0
1971	Boston Garden		0	0	0
1972	Metropolitan Sports Center		0	0	0
1973	Madison Square Garden		0	1	1
1974	Chicago Stadium		0	1	1
1975	Montreal Forum		0	0	0
1976	Spectrum	DNP	—	—	—
1977	Pacific Coliseum		0	0	0
1978	Buffalo Memorial Auditorium		0	1	1
All-Star totals		8	0	3	3

== Legacy ==
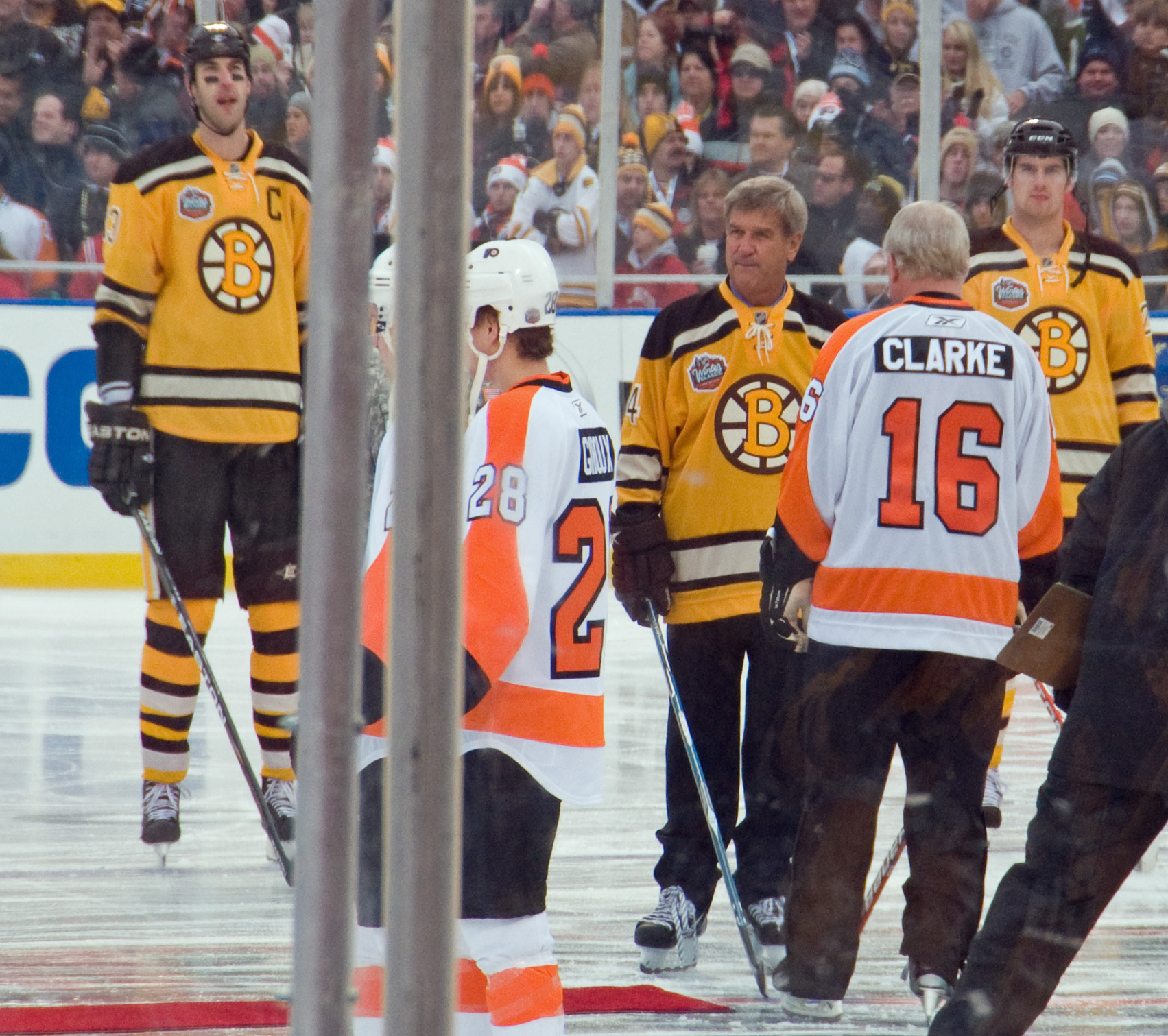
Clarke prepares for the ceremonial puck drop with Bobby Orr prior to the 2010 NHL Winter Classic.

On November 15, 1984, Bobby Clarke Night was held at the Spectrum. The Flyers retired Clarke's #16 jersey and unveiled the Bobby Clarke Trophy which is awarded annually to the Flyers' Most Valuable Player. Three years later Clarke was a first ballot inductee into the Hockey Hall of Fame. The Flyers created a team Hall of Fame in 1988, and the first two inductees were Clarke and Bernie Parent. He also played in the 2012 Winter Classic Alumni Game at Citizens Bank Park against the New York Rangers alumni.

In addition to his NHL honors, Clarke was appointed an Officer of the Order of Canada (O.C.). The trophy he won in 1968 and 1969 with the Bombers, given annually to the Western Hockey League's top scorer, was renamed the Bob Clarke Trophy. He was inducted into three more halls of fame, the Philadelphia Sports Hall of Fame in 2003 as a charter member, Canada's Sports Hall of Fame in 2005, and the Manitoba Hockey Hall of Fame.

=== Records ===
Clarke finished his career 4th all-time in assists and 11th all-time in points, but he has since fallen to 29th all-time in assists and 51st all-time in points (as of completion of the 2025–26 season). His career plus-minus of +507 is 5th all-time. His back-to-back 89 assist seasons in 1974–75 and 1975–76 is still the Flyers team record and he also owns several other Philadelphia Flyers records, including:

All-time regular season

- 1st place - Most games played (1144)
- 4th place - Most goals (358)
- 1st place - Most assists (852)
- 1st place - Most points (1210)
- 4th place - Penalty minutes (1453)
- 1st place - Plus/Minus (+506)
- 1st place - Shorthanded goals (32)

All-time playoffs

- 1st place - Most games played (136)
- 5th place - Most goals (42)
- 1st place - Most assists (77)
- 1st place - Most points (119)

== Awards ==
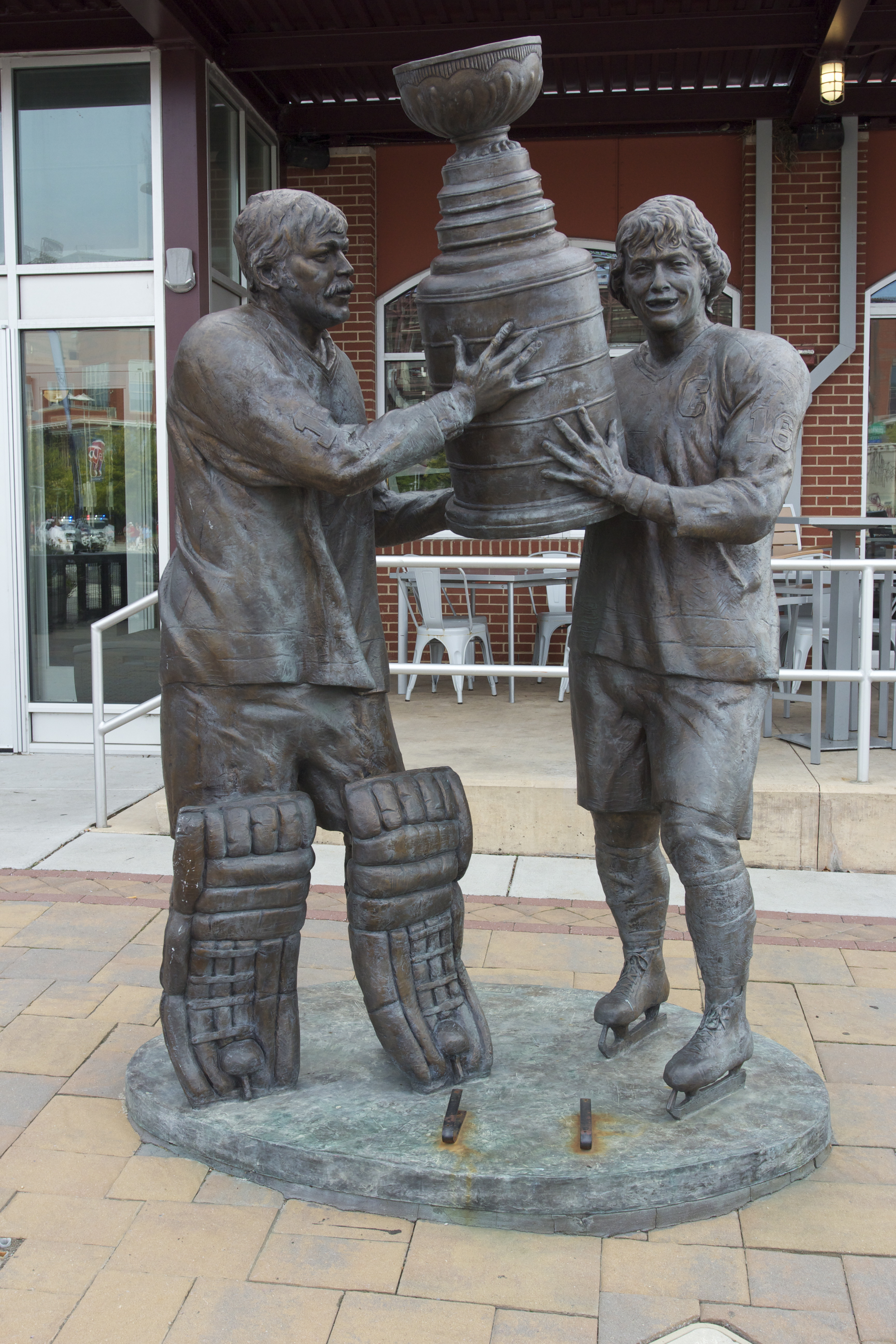
Clarke and Bernie Parent statue in South Philadelphia

Award	Year(s)
Bill Masterton Memorial Trophy	1972
Brownridge Trophy	1968, 1969
Class Guy Award (Philadelphia Flyers team award)	1982
Frank J. Selke Trophy	1983
Hart Memorial Trophy	1973, 1975, 1976
Lester B. Pearson Award	1973
Lester Patrick Trophy	1980
Lionel Conacher Award	1975
Lou Marsh Trophy	1975
NHL All-Star Game	1970, 1971, 1972, 1973, 1974, 1975, 1977, 1978
NHL First All-Star Team	1975, 1976
NHL Second All-Star Team	1973, 1974
Stanley Cup champion	1974, 1975
WCHL MVP	1969
WCHL All-Star Team	1969
WCJHL First All-Star Team	1968

== See also ==
- List of NHL statistical leaders
- List of NHL players who spent their entire career with one franchise

Awards
Preceded by Gerry Pinder	Winner of the Brownridge Trophy; 1968, 1969	Succeeded by Reggie Leach
Preceded by Jim Harrison	Winner of the WCHL MVP Trophy; 1969	Succeeded by Reggie Leach
Preceded by Jean Ratelle	Winner of the Bill Masterton Memorial Trophy; 1972	Succeeded by Lowell MacDonald
Preceded by Bobby Orr	Winner of the Hart Memorial Trophy; 1973	Succeeded by Phil Esposito
Preceded by Phil Esposito	Winner of the Lester B. Pearson Award; 1974	Succeeded by Bobby Orr
Preceded by Ferguson Jenkins	Winner of the Lionel Conacher Award; 1975	Succeeded by Greg Joy
Preceded by Phil Esposito	Winner of the Hart Memorial Trophy; 1975, 1976	Succeeded by Guy Lafleur
Preceded by Bill Barber	Winner of the Class Guy Award; 1982	Succeeded by Mark Howe
Preceded by Steve Kasper	Winner of the Frank J. Selke Trophy; 1983	Succeeded by Doug Jarvis

Sporting positions
Preceded by Ed Van Impe; Bill Barber	Philadelphia Flyers captain 1973–1979; 1982–1984	Succeeded by Mel Bridgman; Dave Poulin
Preceded by Pit Martin	NHLPA president 1975–1979	Succeeded by Phil Esposito
Preceded by Bob McCammon; Russ Farwell	General manager of the Philadelphia Flyers; 1984–1990; 1994–2006	Succeeded by Russ Farwell; Paul Holmgren
Preceded by Jack Ferreira	General manager of the Minnesota North Stars; 1990–1992	Succeeded by Bob Gainey
Preceded by Position created	General manager of the Florida Panthers; 1993–1994	Succeeded by Bryan Murray
