= Bob McCammon =

Canadian ice hockey player (1941–2021)

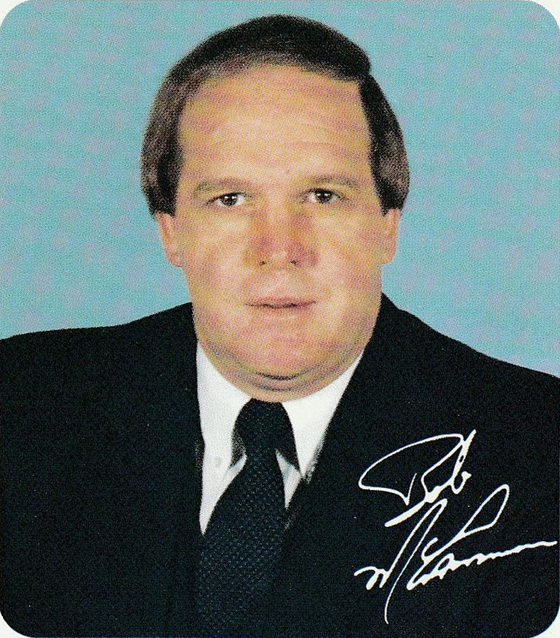
- McCammon in 1985 card
- Born: April 14, 1941 Kenora, Ontario, Canada
- Died: December 23, 2021 (aged 80)
- Height: 5 ft 11 in (180 cm)
- Weight: 170 lb (77 kg; 12 st 2 lb)
- Position: Centre
- Shot: Left
- Played for: Port Huron Flags; Port Huron Wings
- Coached for: Philadelphia Flyers; Edmonton Oilers (assistant); Vancouver Canucks
- Playing career: 1961–1973
- Coaching career: 1973–1998

Robert McCammon (April 14, 1941 – December 23, 2021) was a Canadian professional ice hockey centre and a National Hockey League (NHL) and American Hockey League (AHL) head coach and general manager. He was a pro scout with the Detroit Red Wings.

== Hockey career ==
McCammon never played in the National Hockey League (NHL), spending his entire career in the minor leagues, playing centre with the Port Huron Flags/Wings for nine year in the International Hockey League (IHL).

He began his coaching career in Port Huron during the 1973–74 IHL season. He later became head coach of the Maine Mariners of the American Hockey League and won the Calder Cup in 1977-78 and 1978–79, the first two years of the team's existence. McCammon had two stints as head coach of the Philadelphia Flyers, also serving as the team's general manager during the latter. He was also the head coach of the Vancouver Canucks and an assistant coach for the Edmonton Oilers on two occasions. In the two times he was fired as coach (Philadelphia and Vancouver), he was replaced by Pat Quinn. With Vancouver in 1988–89, he was runner-up to Pat Burns of the Montreal Canadiens for the Jack Adams Trophy as NHL Coach of the Year. He won the Stanley Cup with the Edmonton Oilers in 1987 as director of player development and in 2002 and 2008 as a scout with Detroit. McCammon's name was added to the Stanley Cup in 2002 with Detroit.

== Personal life ==
In 2007, McCammon - along with former Canucks goaltender Kirk McLean - was a co-owner of the Gastown restaurant So.cial in Vancouver. By 2010, McLean had taken over the restaurant and rebranded it as McLean's. McCammon died on December 23, 2021, at the age of 80.

== Coaching record ==
Team	Year	Regular season						Post season
Team	Year	G	W	L	T	Pts	Division rank	Result
Philadelphia Flyers	1978-79	50	22	17	11	55	2nd in Patrick	Fired
Philadelphia Flyers	1981-82	8	4	2	2	10	3rd in Patrick	Lost in Division semifinals
Philadelphia Flyers	1982-83	80	49	23	8	106	1st in Patrick	Lost in Division semifinals
Philadelphia Flyers	1983-84	80	44	26	10	98	3rd in Patrick	Lost in Division semifinals
Vancouver Canucks	1987-88	80	25	46	9	59	5th in Smythe	Missed playoffs
Vancouver Canucks	1988-89	80	33	39	8	74	4th in Smythe	Lost in Division semifinals
Vancouver Canucks	1989-90	80	25	41	14	64	5th in Smythe	Missed playoffs
Vancouver Canucks	1990-91	54	19	30	5	43	4th in Smythe	Fired
Total		512	221	224	67			

Preceded by Fred Shero	Head coach of the Philadelphia Flyers; 1978-79	Succeeded by Pat Quinn
Preceded by Pat Quinn	Head coach of the Philadelphia Flyers; 1982–84	Succeeded by Mike Keenan
Preceded by Keith Allen	General Manager of the Philadelphia Flyers; 1983–84	Succeeded by Bob Clarke
Preceded by Tom Watt	Head coach of the Vancouver Canucks; 1987–91	Succeeded by Pat Quinn
