= List of Philadelphia Flyers general managers =

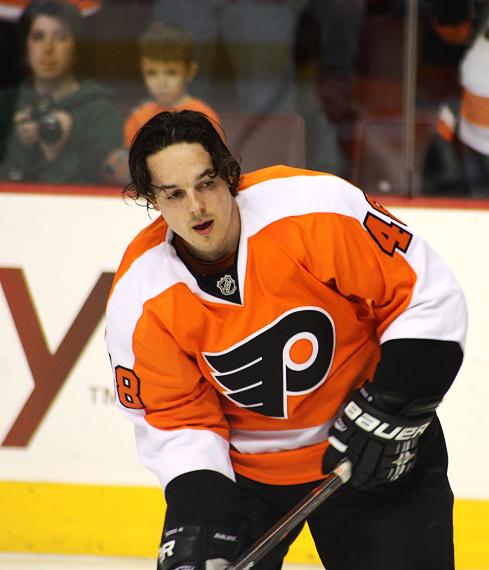
Daniel Briere is the Flyers current general manager.

The Philadelphia Flyers are a professional ice hockey team based in Philadelphia, Pennsylvania. They are members of the Metropolitan Division of the National Hockey League's (NHL) Eastern Conference. The Flyers were founded in 1967 as one of six expansion teams, increasing the size of the NHL at that time to twelve teams.

Since the franchise was established, the team has had ten general managers, including Keith Allen, who built the Flyers teams that won two Stanley Cups in 1974 and 1975, and was inducted into the Hockey Hall of Fame in 1992. Allen served the longest single stint, 14 seasons, as Flyers GM while Bob Clarke served the most seasons (19) over two stints. Daniel Briere is the team’s current general manager.

== Key ==
Key of terms and definitions
Term	Definition
No.	Number of general managers
Ref(s)	References
–	Does not apply
†	Elected to the Hockey Hall of Fame in the Builder category

== General managers ==
General managers of the Philadelphia Flyers
No.	Name	Tenure	Accomplishments during this term	Ref(s)
1	Bud Poile†	May 31, 1966 – December 19, 1969	1 division title; 2 playoff appearances	
2	Keith Allen†	December 22, 1969 – May 27, 1983	Won Stanley Cup twice (1974, 1975); 2 additional Stanley Cup Final appearances; 4 Campbell Conference titles; 6 division titles; 12 playoff appearances	
3	Bob McCammon	May 27, 1983 – April 25, 1984	1 playoff appearance	
4	Bob Clarke	May 15, 1984 – April 16, 1990	2 Eastern Conference titles; 3 division titles; 5 playoff appearances	
5	Russ Farwell	June 6, 1990 – June 15, 1994		
6	Bob Clarke	June 15, 1994 – October 22, 2006	1 Eastern Conference title; 5 division titles; 11 playoff appearances	
7	Paul Holmgren	October 22, 2006 – May 7, 2014	1 Eastern Conference title; 1 division title; 6 playoff appearances	
8	Ron Hextall	May 7, 2014 – November 26, 2018	2 playoff appearances	
9	Chuck Fletcher	December 3, 2018 – March 10, 2023	1 playoff appearance	
10	Daniel Briere	March 10, 2023 – present	1 playoff appearance	

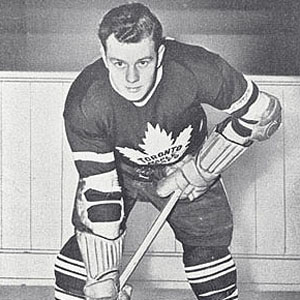
Bud Poile, shown here during his playing career with the Toronto Maple Leafs, was the team's first general manager.

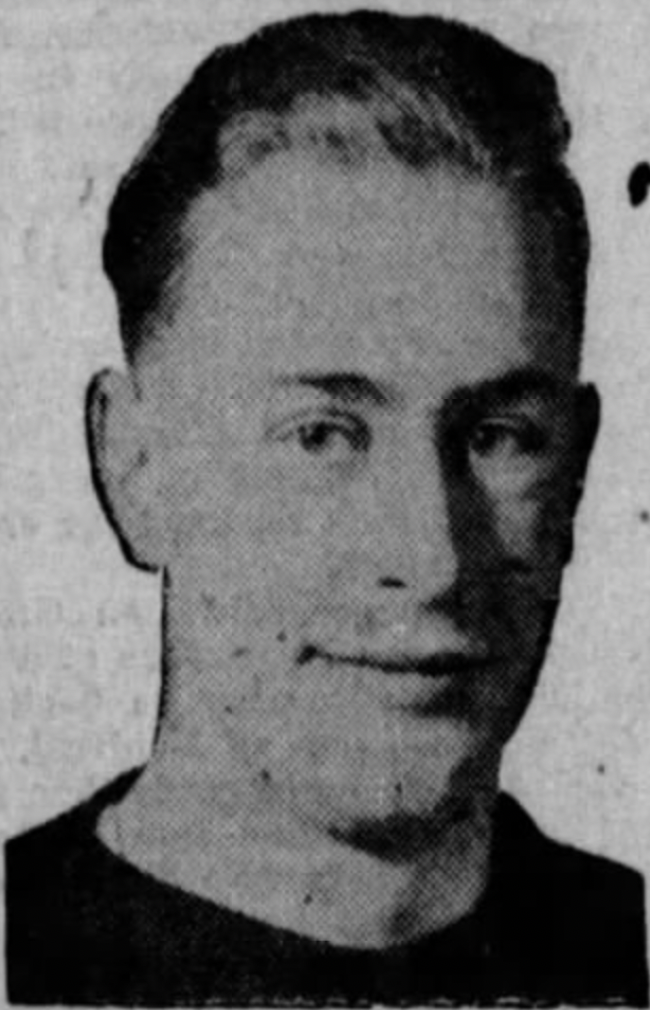
Keith Allen, shown here during his playing career, won two Stanley Cups as the team's general manager.

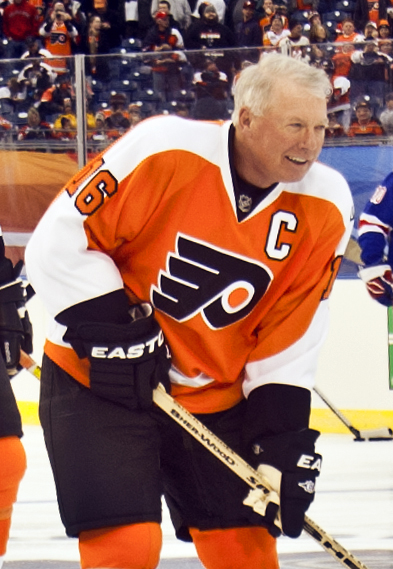
Bob Clarke, shown here during the warmup for the 2012 Winter Classic Alumni Game, served 19 seasons over two stints as general manager.

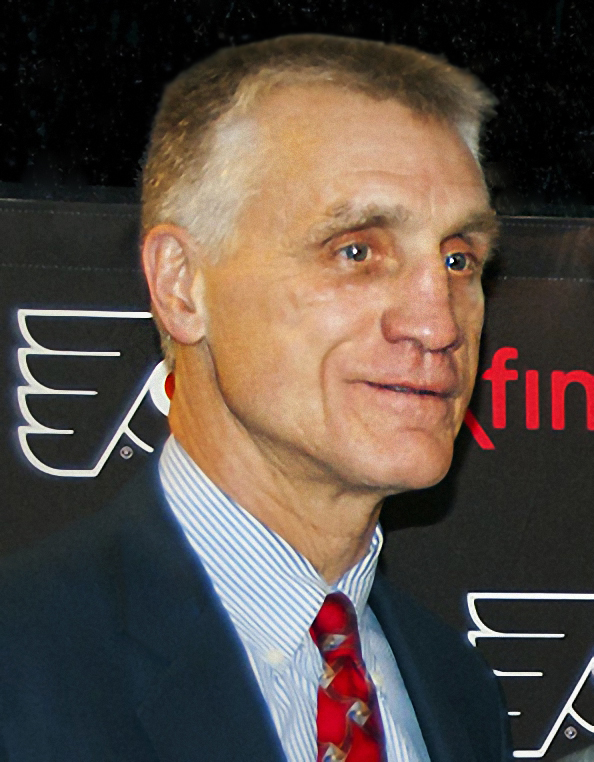
The Flyers reached the Stanley Cup Final in 2010 during Paul Holmgren's tenure as general manager.

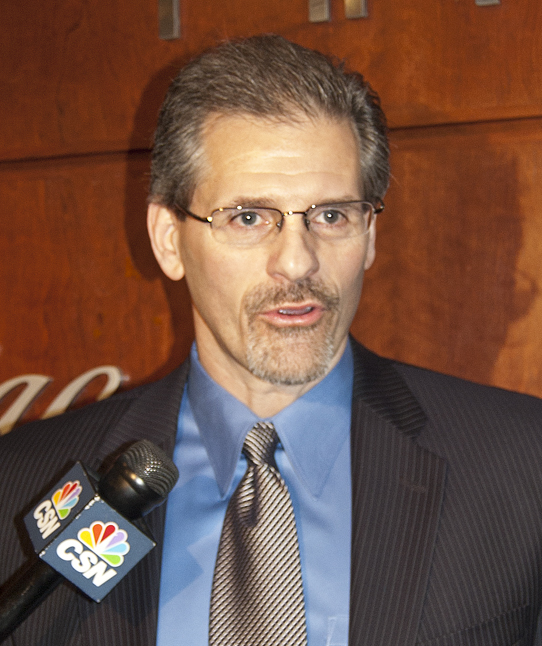
Ron Hextall was the team's general manager for five seasons.

== See also ==
- List of NHL general managers
