= Paul Holmgren =

American ice hockey player and executive

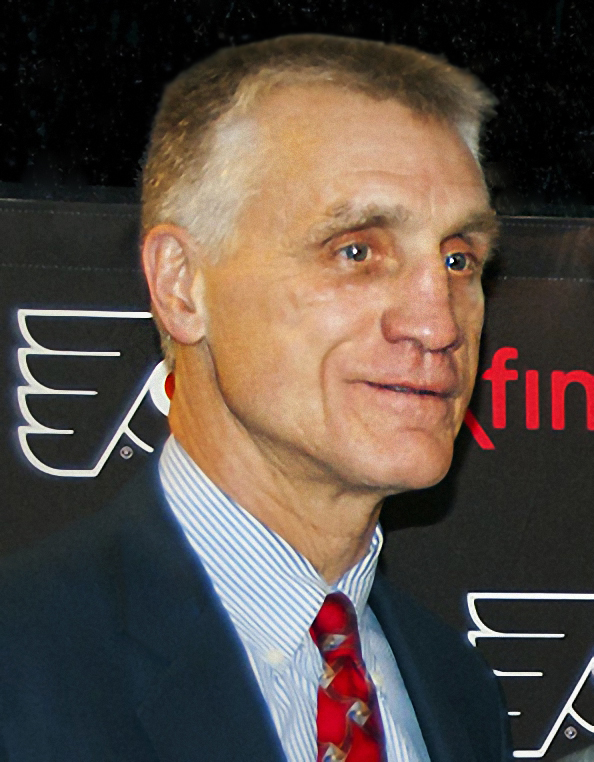
- Holmgren in 2014
- Born: December 2, 1955 (age 70) Saint Paul, Minnesota, U.S.
- Height: 6 ft 3 in (191 cm)
- Weight: 210 lb (95 kg; 15 st 0 lb)
- Position: Right wing
- Shot: Right
- Played for: Minnesota Fighting Saints; Philadelphia Flyers; Minnesota North Stars
- Coached for: Philadelphia Flyers; Hartford Whalers
- National team: United States
- NHL draft: 108th overall, 1975; Philadelphia Flyers
- WHA draft: 67th overall, 1974; Edmonton Oilers
- Playing career: 1975–1985
- Coaching career: 1985–1995

Paul Howard Holmgren (born December 2, 1955) is an American former professional ice hockey player and executive. He previously served as the general manager and president of the Philadelphia Flyers of the National Hockey League (NHL). As a player, he featured in the 1980 Stanley Cup Final with the Flyers.

He is currently a senior advisor to Dan Hilferty, Comcast Spectacor Chairman and CEO and Governor of the Flyers. He played ten NHL seasons for the Flyers and Minnesota North Stars. After his playing career ended, he moved into coaching, serving as head coach of the Flyers and Hartford Whalers, and later went into management.

Holmgren is a resident of the Somerset section of Franklin Township, Somerset County, New Jersey and of the Jersey Shore community of Avalon.

== Early life ==
Paul Holmgren began skating as early as age two thanks to his dad who flooded the empty lot next to their house in St. Paul, Minnesota. He and his older brother Mark began playing organized hockey at age six. He skated for St. Paul Harding High School and played in the legendary Minnesota State High School Hockey Tournament. When his schoolboy days were over, he played a year of junior hockey with the St. Paul Vulcans of the Midwest Junior Hockey League in 1973-74 and was then selected to be part of the US junior national team to compete in the 1974 World Junior Ice Hockey Championships in Leningrad.

== Playing career ==
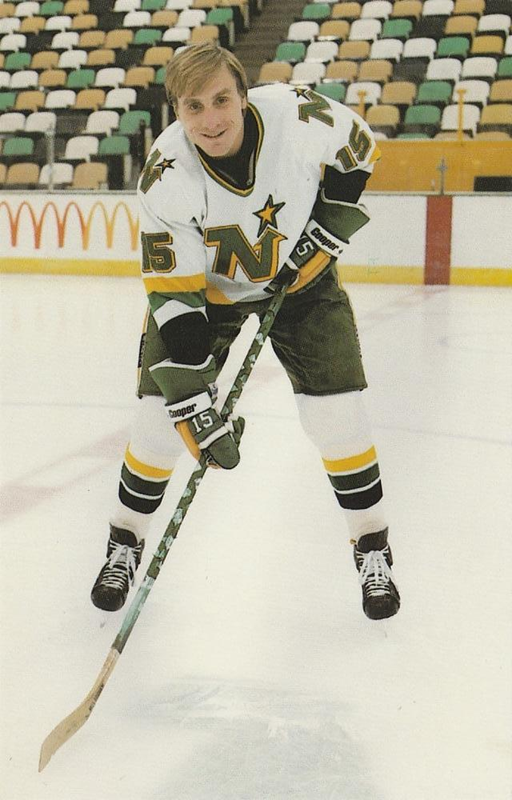
1984 postcard of Paul Holmgren for Minnesota North Stars

Holmgren was selected by the Edmonton Oilers 67th overall in the 1974 WHA Amateur Draft. He never played for Edmonton as his WHA rights were traded to the Minnesota Fighting Saints. A year later he was selected by the Philadelphia Flyers 108th overall in the 1975 NHL Amateur Draft. He began his professional career with the Fighting Saints in 1975–76, but left the team on February 28, 1976, three days before it folded because of financial problems. He signed with the Flyers shortly after and made his NHL debut a month later where he got a chance to play with his childhood role model Gary Dornhoefer. Holmgren's hectic first professional season nearly ended in tragic fashion. While playing for the Richmond Robins, the Flyers AHL affiliate at the time, he suffered a scratched cornea. He was rushed to surgery in a Boston hospital and an allergic reaction to the anesthetic nearly cost him his life.

Holmgren spent the next eight seasons in Philadelphia and was annually among the team's leaders in penalty minutes and was also able to contribute offensively. He posted career highs in goals (30) and points (65) in 1979–80 and added ten goals and ten assists during the Flyers playoff run. His three goals in game two of the Stanley Cup Finals was the first time a U.S.-born player scored a hat trick in a Cup Final game. The next season, he was invited to the 1981 NHL All-Star Game and also the United States 1981 Canada Cup team (he separated his shoulder at Team USA's Canada Cup training camp in August 1981 and missed the tournament itself as well as the start of the 1981–82 NHL season). Holmgren was traded to the Minnesota North Stars mid-way through 1983–84. He left Philly with 1,600 penalty minutes, the most in Flyers franchise history up until Rick Tocchet broke the record during the 1991–92 season. He only played 27 regular season and 15 playoff games with the North Stars as he retired after the 1984–85 season. Holmgren is also known for his punch to the chest of referee Andy Van Hellemond in 1981, which initiated major changes to the rule regarding physical abuse of on ice officials in the NHL.

== Coaching/management career ==
Holmgren immediately moved into coaching upon retiring, becoming an assistant coach with the Flyers under second-year coach Mike Keenan. After Keenan was fired following the 1987–88 season, Holmgren became the first former Flyer to be named the team's head coach. During his first season as coach, the Flyers made an unexpected run to the Wales Conference Finals before bowing out to the Montreal Canadiens in six games. This playoff run included an improbable 4-games-to-3 second-round victory over Mario Lemieux's Pittsburgh Penguins; with the clincher coming on the road in a thrilling game 7. The team missed the playoffs the next two seasons, however, and midway through his fourth season as coach he was fired.

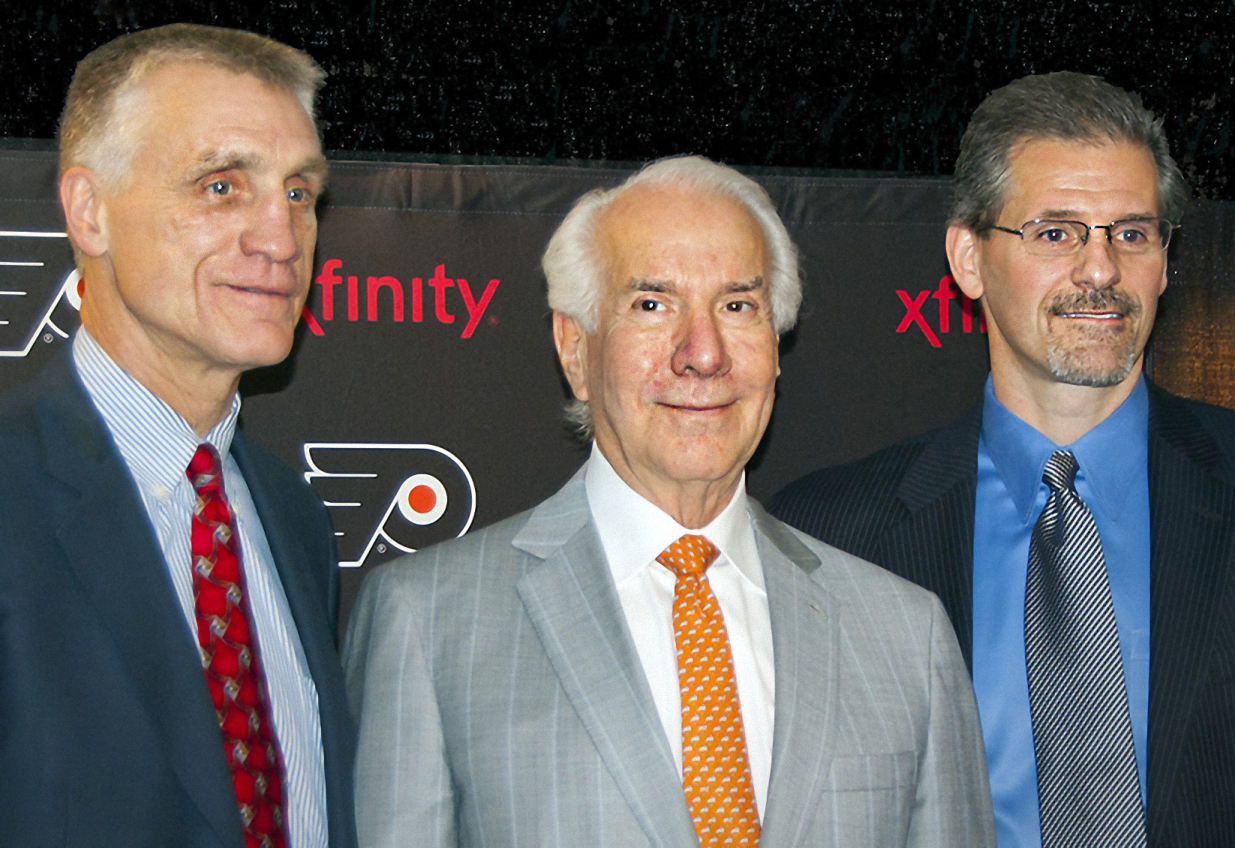
Paul Holmgren, Ed Snider and Ron Hextall on May 7, 2014, as Holmgren became president and Hextall was made GM of the club.

On June 15, 1992, Holmgren was named head coach of the Hartford Whalers. When Brian Burke left the Whalers in September 1993, Holmgren assumed the position of general manager as well. On November 16, 1994, Holmgren stepped aside as head coach due to frustration with a lack of effort from his players and a desire to focus on his role as the team's general manager. He was succeeded by assistant general manager Pierre McGuire. On March 30, 1994, Holmgren was arrested after driving drunk in Simsbury, Connecticut. He entered the Betty Ford Center for treatment. Whalers owner Richard Gordon was going to fire Holmgren, however he changed his mind after conversations with Holmgren's counselor at the Betty Ford Center, NHL commissioner Gary Bettman, and Connecticut Governor Lowell P. Weicker Jr. After McGuire was fired May 1994, Holmgren returned as head coach. When the team was purchased by Peter Karmanos, Jim Rutherford was named general manager. However, Rutherford and Karmanos asked Holmgren to stay on as head coach. On November 6, 1995, Holmgren was fired and replaced by assistant coach and former Detroit Junior Red Wings head coach Paul Maurice. At the time of his dismissal, the Whalers had won only one of its last eight games after starting out the season 4–0.

He returned to Philadelphia on December 30, 1995, as the director of pro scouting. He was named the director of player personnel following the 1996–97 season and was named assistant general manager following the 1998–99 season. He served in that position under general manager Bobby Clarke until Clarke resigned a month into the 2006–07 season, at which time Holmgren was named general manager of the club.

On May 7, 2014, Holmgren was promoted to president of the Flyers, and Ron Hextall was named to replace him as the club's seventh general manager. On September 16, 2014, the NHL announced that Holmgren was named one of two 2014 recipients (along with NHL Deputy Commissioner Bill Daly) of the Lester Patrick Award for his contributions to hockey in the United States. He received the award as part of the U.S. Hockey Hall of Fame Induction Ceremony and Dinner on Thursday, December 4, in Minneapolis.

== Awards ==
- 1981 – Played in NHL All-Star Game
- 2014 – Lester Patrick Trophy Winner
- 2021 – Inducted into Flyers Hall of Fame

== Records ==
- 1980 – First U.S.-born player to score a hat trick in a Stanley Cup Final game
- Philadelphia Flyers all-time leader in playoff Gordie Howe hat tricks – 2

== Career statistics ==
=== Regular season and playoffs ===
			Regular season					Playoffs
Season	Team	League	GP	G	A	Pts	PIM	GP	G	A	Pts	PIM
1973–74	St. Paul Vulcans	MWJHL	55	22	59	81	183	—	—	—	—	—
1974–75	University of Minnesota	WCHA	37	10	21	31	108	—	—	—	—	—
1975–76	Minnesota Fighting Saints	WHA	51	14	16	30	121	—	—	—	—	—
1975–76	Johnstown Jets	NAHL	6	3	12	15	12	—	—	—	—	—
1975–76	Philadelphia Flyers	NHL	1	0	0	0	2	—	—	—	—	—
1975–76	Richmond Robins	AHL	6	4	4	8	23	—	—	—	—	—
1976–77	Philadelphia Flyers	NHL	59	14	12	26	201	10	1	1	2	25
1977–78	Philadelphia Flyers	NHL	62	16	18	34	190	12	1	4	5	26
1978–79	Philadelphia Flyers	NHL	57	19	10	29	168	8	1	5	6	22
1979–80	Philadelphia Flyers	NHL	74	30	35	65	267	18	10	10	20	47
1980–81	Philadelphia Flyers	NHL	77	22	37	59	306	12	5	9	14	49
1981–82	Philadelphia Flyers	NHL	41	9	22	31	183	4	1	2	3	6
1982–83	Philadelphia Flyers	NHL	77	19	24	43	178	3	0	0	0	6
1983–84	Philadelphia Flyers	NHL	52	9	13	22	105	—	—	—	—	—
1983–84	Minnesota North Stars	NHL	11	2	5	7	46	12	0	1	1	6
1984–85	Minnesota North Stars	NHL	16	4	3	7	38	3	0	0	0	8
WHA totals			51	14	16	30	121	—	—	—	—	—
NHL totals			527	144	179	323	1684	82	19	32	51	195

=== International ===
Year	Team	Event	GP	G	A	Pts	PIM
1974	United States	WJC	3	0	0	0	8
Junior totals			3	0	0	0	8

=== All-Star games ===
Year	Location	G	A	P
1981	Los Angeles	0	1	1
All-Star totals		0	1	1

== Coaching statistics ==
Team	Year	Regular season						Postseason		
Team	Year	G	W	L	T	Pts	Finish	W	L	Result
PHI	1988–89	80	36	36	8	80	4th in Patrick	10	9	Lost in Conference Finals
PHI	1989–90	80	30	39	11	71	6th in Patrick	—	—	Missed playoffs
PHI	1990–91	80	33	37	10	76	5th in Patrick	—	—	Missed playoffs
PHI	1991–92	24	8	14	2	(18)	(fired)	—	—	—
HAR	1992–93	84	26	52	6	58	5th in Adams	—	—	Missed playoffs
HAR	1993–94	17	4	11	2	(10)	6th in Northeast	—	—	(moved to GM's role)
HAR	1994–95	48	19	25	5	43	5th in Northeast	—	—	Missed playoffs
HAR	1995–96	12	5	6	1	(11)	(fired)	—	—	—
Total		425	161	219	45					

Sporting positions
Preceded by Mike Keenan	Head coach of the Philadelphia Flyers; 1988–1992	Succeeded by Bill Dineen
Preceded by Jim Roberts	Head coach of the Hartford Whalers; 1992–1993	Succeeded by Pierre McGuire
Preceded by Brian Burke	General manager of the Hartford Whalers; 1993–1994	Succeeded by Jim Rutherford
Preceded by Pierre McGuire	Head coach of the Hartford Whalers; 1994–1995	Succeeded by Paul Maurice
Preceded by Bob Clarke	General manager of the Philadelphia Flyers; 2006–2014	Succeeded by Ron Hextall
