= Keith Allen (ice hockey) =

Canadian ice hockey player

- Hockey Hall of Fame, 1992 (Builder)
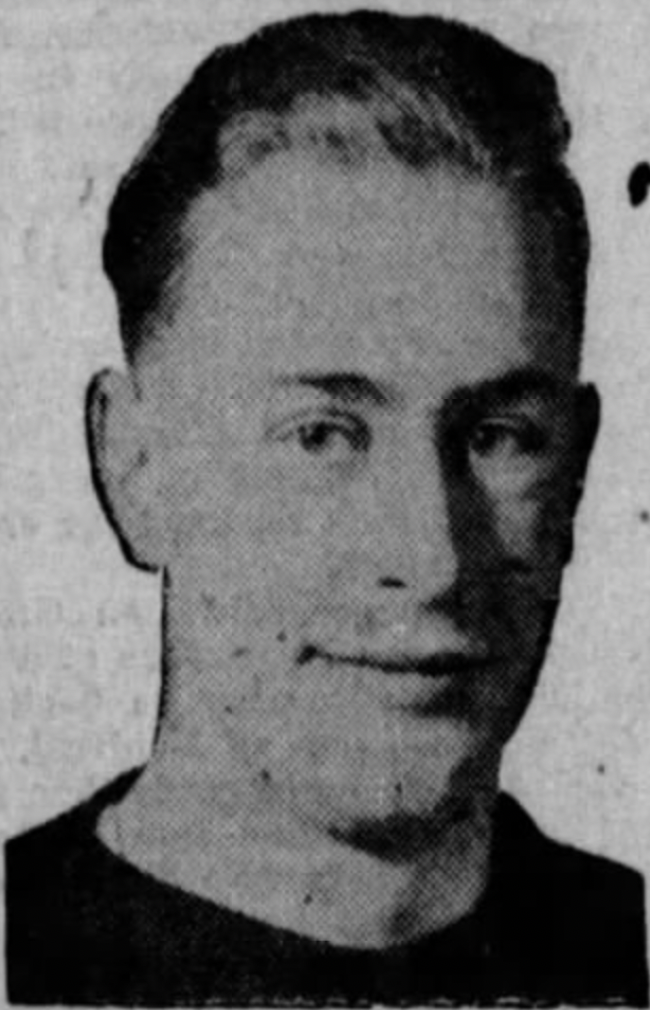
- Keith Allen pictured with the Saskatoon Quakers, circa 1941
- Born: August 21, 1923 Saskatoon, Saskatchewan, Canada
- Died: February 4, 2014 (aged 90) Newtown Square, Pennsylvania, U.S.
- Height: 5 ft 11 in (180 cm)
- Weight: 190 lb (86 kg; 13 st 8 lb)
- Position: Defence
- Shot: Left
- Played for: Detroit Red Wings
- Coached for: Philadelphia Flyers
- Playing career: 1941–1957
- Coaching career: 1956–1969

Courtney Keith "Bingo" Allen (August 21, 1923 – February 4, 2014) was a Canadian professional ice hockey defenceman and National Hockey League (NHL) head coach and general manager. He played 28 games in the NHL for the Detroit Red Wings during the 1953–54 and 1954–55 seasons. The rest of his career, which lasted from 1941 to 1957, was spent in various minor leagues.

After his playing career, he turned to coaching and managing, first in the minor Western Hockey League before returning to the NHL in 1967 as the first coach and general manager of the Philadelphia Flyers. He coached the Flyers from 1967 to 1969, staying as general manager until 1983. He was the executive vice-president of the Philadelphia Flyers, a position he held from 1980 for the rest of his life.

== Playing career ==
Allen played junior hockey for the Saskatoon Quakers in 1940–41, and then joined the Washington Eagles of the Eastern Amateur Hockey League for the 1941–42 season, followed by a year with the Buffalo Bisons of the American Hockey League. During the Second World War, he played on the Saskatoon Navy hockey team, and then played the 1945–46 season in the Western Canada Senior Hockey League with the Saskatoon Elks.

In 1946, Allen joined the Springfield Indians of the American Hockey League, for whom he played the next five seasons. The Indians moved to Syracuse in 1951, becoming the Warriors, and he was a steady presence in the line-up for the next two and a half seasons. In February 1954, Warriors owner Eddie Shore tried to assign Allen to the Springfield Indians of the Quebec Hockey League, but he (along with several other players) balked and he was suspended. He was sold to the Detroit Red Wings two weeks later. He played 10 games with Detroit in the 1953–54 season and appeared in the playoffs, getting his name engraved on the Stanley Cup. Allen played another 18 games for the Red Wings in 1954–55, which would be the end of his NHL playing career.

He spent most of the 1954–55 season in the Western Hockey League with the Edmonton Flyers—Detroit's farm team, whose roster included future Hockey Hall of Fame inductees Johnny Bucyk, Norm Ullman, Glenn Hall, Al Arbour, and player-coach Bud Poile. He then played one season with the Brandon Regals before being hired by the Seattle Americans as player-head coach in 1956. He retired as a player in 1957 to become a full-time coach.

== Coaching/management career ==
From 1956 to 1965, Allen was a head coach in the Western Hockey League with the Seattle Americans/Seattle Totems, with only one losing season in eight years. With the NHL expansion in 1967, Allen was hired as the first head coach of the Philadelphia Flyers, with his former coach and teammate Bud Poile as general manager. In their inaugural season, the Flyers finished first in their division with the best record among the six new teams. They fell to third place in their division in the 1968–69 NHL season, and Allen then became the Flyers' general manager while serving in the same capacity with the Quebec Aces at the same time. There, he would help construct the famed "Broad Street Bullies" that led the Flyers to consecutive Stanley Cups in 1974 and 1975. He would also help start the AHL's Maine Mariners, one of the most successful franchises in that league's history.

Allen was elected to the Hockey Hall of Fame as a Builder in 1992. He was the executive vice-president of the Flyers.

== Life ==
He was born in Saskatoon, Saskatchewan.

Allen was married to Joyce Webster for 65 years. Together they had a daughter, Traci, and two sons, Brad and Blake. Relocating from Seattle in the 1960s, he and his wife Joyce settled in Bryn Mawr, Pennsylvania.

Due to developing dementia in his later years, Allen lived in the care of an assisted living community, along with wife Joyce, in Newtown Square, Pennsylvania. He died on February 4, 2014. He was 90-years-old.

== Career statistics ==
=== Regular season and playoffs ===
			Regular season					Playoffs
Season	Team	League	GP	G	A	Pts	PIM	GP	G	A	Pts	PIM
1939–40	North Battleford Beavers	N-SJHL	—	—	—	—	—	—	—	—	—	—
1940–41	Saskatoon Quakers	SJHL	10	4	0	4	2	2	1	0	1	2
1940–41	Saskatoon Quakers	M-Cup	—	—	—	—	—	14	3	3	6	8
1941–42	Washington Eagles	EAHL	60	13	11	24	27	8	0	1	1	0
1942–43	Buffalo Bisons	AHL	55	1	14	15	29	7	1	0	1	0
1943–44	Saskatoon Navy	SSHL	15	9	7	16	12	1	0	0	0	0
1944–45	Saskatoon Navy	SJHL	5	0	1	1	0	—	—	—	—	—
1945–46	Saskatoon Elks	WCHL	33	5	4	9	42	3	1	0	1	6
1946–47	Springfield Indians	AHL	61	2	8	10	23	2	0	0	0
1947–48	Springfield Indians	AHL	51	2	12	14	12	—	—	—	—	—
1948–49	Springfield Indians	AHL	68	3	28	31	28	3	1	0	1	4
1949–50	Springfield Indians	AHL	69	3	17	20	30	2	0	2	2	0
1950–51	Springfield Indians	AHL	70	8	34	42	18	3	0	0	0	0
1951–52	Syracuse Warriors	AHL	67	4	17	21	24	—	—	—	—	—
1952–53	Syracuse Warriors	AHL	64	1	18	19	24	2	0	0	0	0
1953–54	Syracuse Warriors	AHL	47	6	17	23	14	—	—	—	—	—
1953–54	Sherbrooke Saints	QHL	3	0	1	1	4	—	—	—	—	—
1953–54	Detroit Red Wings	NHL	10	0	4	4	2	5	0	0	0	0
1954–55	Detroit Red Wings	NHL	18	0	0	0	6	—	—	—	—	—
1954–55	Edmonton Flyers	WHL	34	4	12	16	10	9	0	2	2	6
1955–56	Brandon Regals	WHL	69	0	13	13	40	—	—	—	—	—
1956–57	Seattle Americans	WHL	41	0	6	6	0	—	—	—	—	—
AHL totals			552	30	165	195	202	19	2	2	4	4
NHL totals			28	0	4	4	8	5	0	0	0	0

== Head coaching record ==
Team	Year	Regular season						Postseason			
Team	Year	G	W	L	T	Pts	Finish	W	L	Win %	Result
Philadelphia Flyers	1967–68	74	31	32	11	73	1st in West	3	4	.429	Lost in quarterfinals
Philadelphia Flyers	1968–69	76	20	35	21	61	3rd in West	0	4	.000	Lost in quarterfinals
NHL total		150	51	67	33			3	8	.273	2 playoff appearances

== See also ==
- List of NHL head coaches

Preceded by Position created	Head coach of the Philadelphia Flyers; 1967–69	Succeeded by Vic Stasiuk
Preceded by Bud Poile	General Manager of the Philadelphia Flyers; 1969–83	Succeeded by Bob McCammon
