= List of Philadelphia Flyers head coaches =

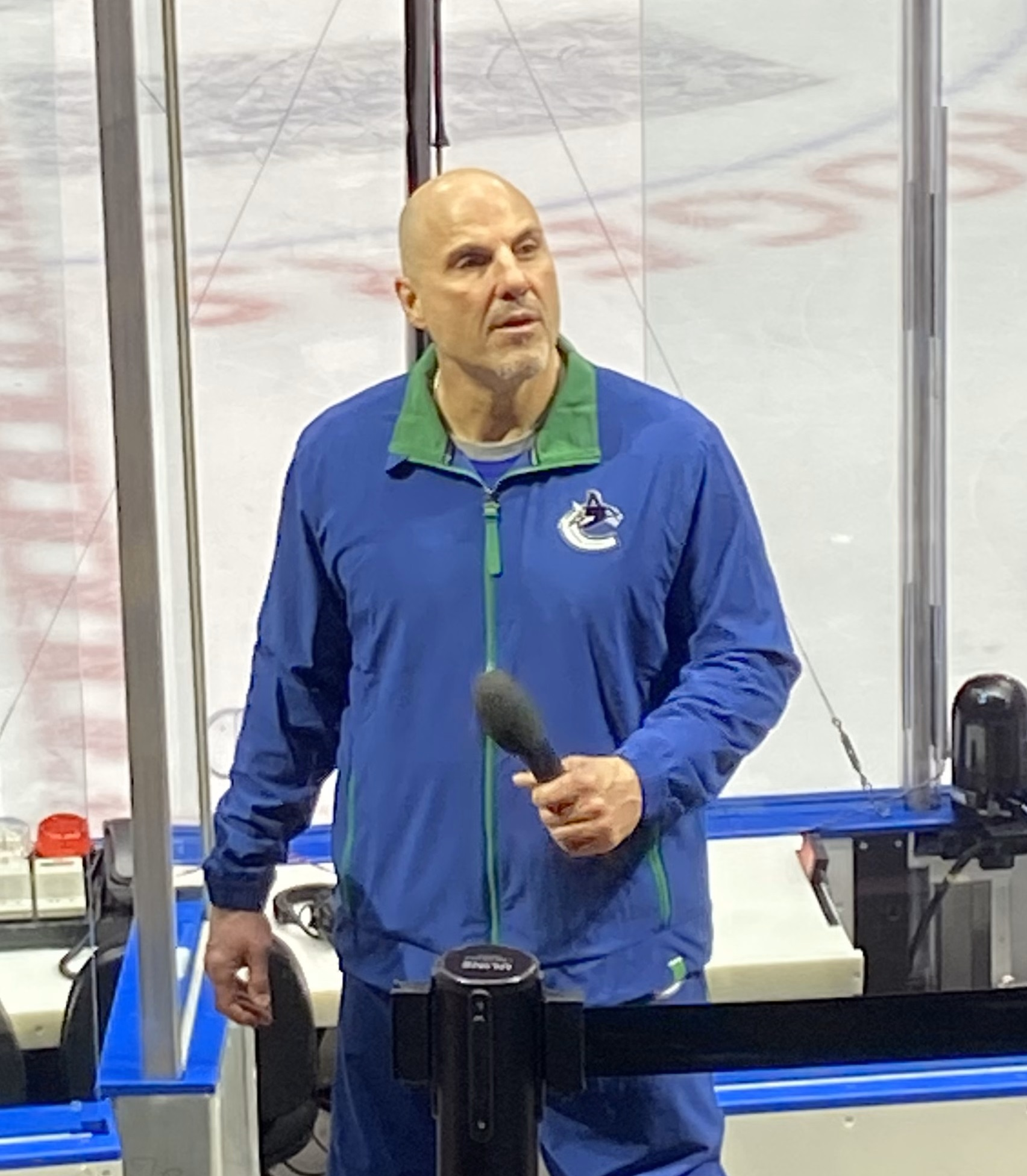
Rick Tocchet is the current head coach of the Flyers.

The Philadelphia Flyers are a professional ice hockey team based in Philadelphia. They are members of the Metropolitan Division of the National Hockey League's (NHL) Eastern Conference. The Flyers were founded in 1967 as one of six expansion teams, increasing the size of the NHL at that time to 12 teams.

Since the franchise was established, the team has had 25 head coaches, including Fred Shero, who coached the Flyers to two Stanley Cups in 1974 and 1975, and was the inaugural winner of the Jack Adams Award in 1973–74. Three other Flyers coaches have won the Adams Award – Pat Quinn in 1979–80, Mike Keenan in 1984–85, and Bill Barber in 2000–01. The Flyers current head coach is Rick Tocchet.

== Key ==
Key of terms and definitions
| Term | Definition |
|---|---|
| No. | Number of coaches (Note: A running total of the number of coaches of the Flyers. Thus any coach who has two or more separate terms as head coach is only counted once.) |
| GC | Games coached |
| W | Wins |
| L | Losses |
| T | Ties |
| OT | Overtime/shootout losses |
| Pts | Points |
| Pts% | Points percentage |
| Win% | Winning percentage |
| # | Spent entire NHL head coaching career with the Flyers |
| † | Elected to the Hockey Hall of Fame in the Builder category |
| ‡ | Spent entire NHL head coaching career with the Flyers and also elected to the Hockey Hall of Fame in the Builder category |

== Coaches ==
Note: Statistics are correct through the 2025–26 season.

Head coaches of the Philadelphia Flyers
| No. | Name | Tenure | Regular season | | | | | | | Playoffs | | | | Refs |
| No. | Name | Tenure | GC | W | L | T | OT | Pts | Pts% | GC | W | L | Win% | Refs |
|---|---|---|---|---|---|---|---|---|---|---|---|---|---|---|
| 1 | Keith Allen‡ | June 6, 1966 – May 19, 1969 | 150 | 51 | 67 | 32 | — | 134 | .447 | 11 | 3 | 8 | .273 | |
| 2 | Vic Stasiuk | May 19, 1969 – May 27, 1971 | 154 | 45 | 68 | 41 | — | 131 | .425 | 4 | 0 | 4 | .000 | |
| 3 | Fred Shero† | June 2, 1971 – May 22, 1978 | 554 | 308 | 151 | 95 | — | 711 | .642 | 83 | 48 | 35 | .578 | |
| 4 | Bob McCammon | July 6, 1978 – January 30, 1979 | 50 | 22 | 17 | 11 | — | 55 | .550 | — | — | — | — | |
| 5 | Pat Quinn† | January 30, 1979 – March 19, 1982 | 262 | 141 | 73 | 48 | — | 330 | .630 | 39 | 22 | 17 | .564 | |
| – | Bob McCammon | March 19, 1982 – April 25, 1984 | 168 | 97 | 51 | 20 | — | 214 | .637 | 10 | 1 | 9 | .100 | |
| 6 | Mike Keenan | May 24, 1984 – May 11, 1988 | 320 | 190 | 102 | 28 | — | 408 | .638 | 57 | 32 | 25 | .561 | |
| 7 | Paul Holmgren | June 1, 1988 – December 4, 1991 | 264 | 107 | 126 | 31 | — | 245 | .464 | 19 | 10 | 9 | .526 | |
| 8 | Bill Dineen# | December 4, 1991 – May 24, 1993 | 140 | 60 | 60 | 20 | — | 140 | .500 | — | — | — | — | |
| 9 | Terry Simpson | May 24, 1993 – May 20, 1994 | 84 | 35 | 39 | 10 | — | 80 | .476 | — | — | — | — | |
| 10 | Terry Murray | June 23, 1994 – June 13, 1997 | 212 | 118 | 64 | 30 | — | 266 | .627 | 46 | 28 | 18 | .609 | |
| 11 | Wayne Cashman# | July 7, 1997 – March 9, 1998 | 61 | 32 | 20 | 9 | — | 73 | .598 | — | — | — | — | |
| 12 | Roger Neilson† | March 9, 1998 – June 8, 2000 (Note: Neilson went on medical leave on February 20, 2000 and initially planned on returning at the end of the first round of the playoffs, but his doctors advised the Flyers that he lacked the strength to perform his duties as head coach. After interim coach Craig Ramsay led the Flyers to the Eastern Conference Finals, the Flyers named Ramsay head coach. The games Ramsay coached in place of Neilson are officially counted on Neilson's coaching totals.) | 185 | 92 | 57 | 33 | 3 | 220 | .595 | 29 | 14 | 15 | .483 | |
| 13 | Craig Ramsay | June 8, 2000 – December 10, 2000 | 28 | 12 | 12 | 4 | 0 | 28 | .500 | — | — | — | — | |
| 14 | Bill Barber# | December 10, 2000 – April 30, 2002 | 136 | 73 | 40 | 17 | 6 | 169 | .621 | 11 | 3 | 8 | .273 | |
| 15 | Ken Hitchcock† | May 14, 2002 – October 22, 2006 | 254 | 131 | 73 | 28 | 22 | 312 | .614 | 37 | 19 | 18 | .514 | |
| 16 | John Stevens | October 22, 2006 – December 4, 2009 | 263 | 120 | 109 | — | 34 | 274 | .521 | 23 | 11 | 12 | .478 | |
| 17 | Peter Laviolette | December 4, 2009 – October 7, 2013 | 272 | 145 | 98 | — | 29 | 319 | .586 | 45 | 23 | 22 | .511 | |
| 18 | Craig Berube | October 7, 2013 – April 17, 2015 | 161 | 75 | 58 | — | 28 | 178 | .553 | 7 | 3 | 4 | .429 | |
| 19 | Dave Hakstol | May 18, 2015 – December 17, 2018 | 277 | 134 | 101 | — | 42 | 310 | .560 | 12 | 4 | 8 | .333 | |
| 20 | Scott Gordon (interim) | December 17, 2018 – April 15, 2019 | 51 | 25 | 22 | — | 4 | 54 | .529 | — | — | — | — | |
| 21 | Alain Vigneault | April 15, 2019 – December 6, 2021 | 147 | 74 | 54 | — | 19 | 167 | .568 | 16 | 10 | 6 | .625 | |
| 22 | Mike Yeo (interim) | December 6, 2021 – May 3, 2022 | 60 | 17 | 36 | — | 7 | 41 | .342 | — | — | — | — | |
| 23 | John Tortorella | June 17, 2022 – March 27, 2025 | 237 | 97 | 107 | — | 33 | 227 | .479 | — | — | — | — | |
| 24 | Brad Shaw (interim) | March 27, 2025 – May 14, 2025 | 9 | 5 | 3 | — | 1 | 11 | .611 | — | — | — | — | |
| 25 | Rick Tocchet | May 14, 2025 – present | 82 | 43 | 27 | — | 12 | 98 | .598 | 10 | 4 | 6 | .400 | |

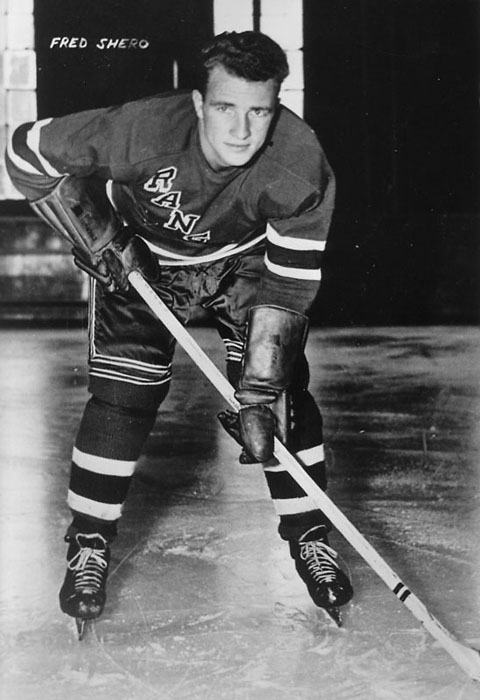
Fred Shero, shown here during his playing days with the New York Rangers, led the Flyers to back-to-back Stanley Cup championships and was the inaugural winner of the Jack Adams Award.

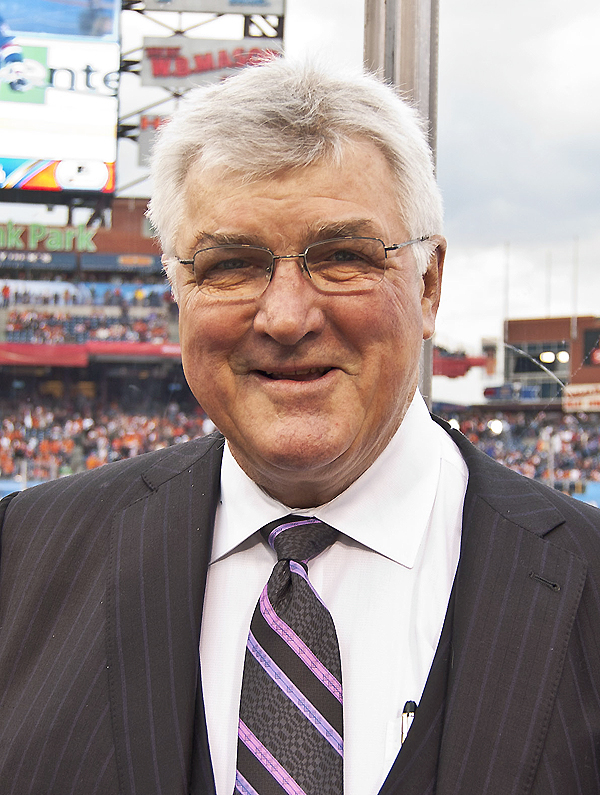
Pat Quinn won the Jack Adams Award during the Flyers record breaking 1979–80 season.

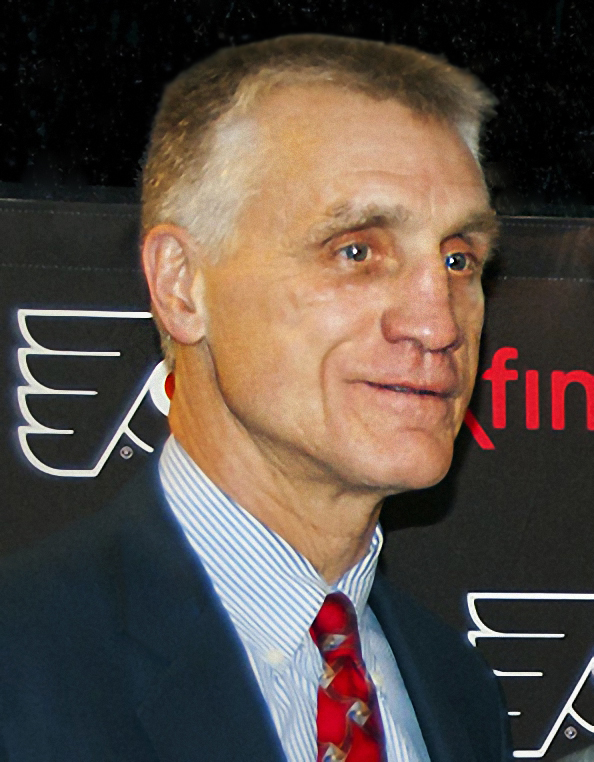
Paul Holmgren served four seasons as Flyers head coach.

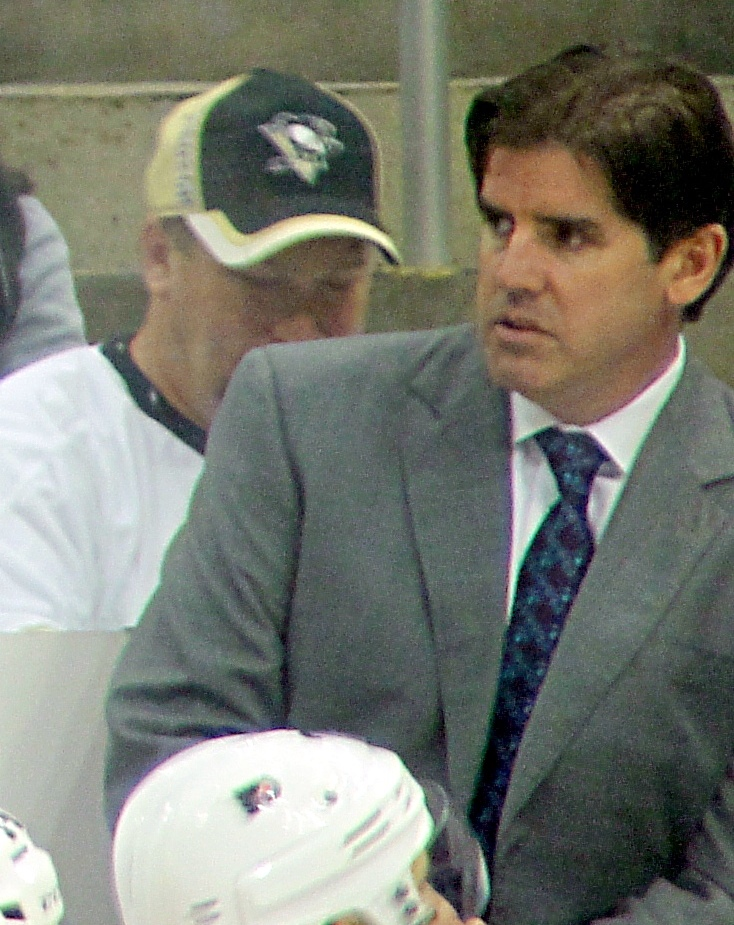
Peter Laviolette's five seasons as Flyers coach is second only to Fred Shero.

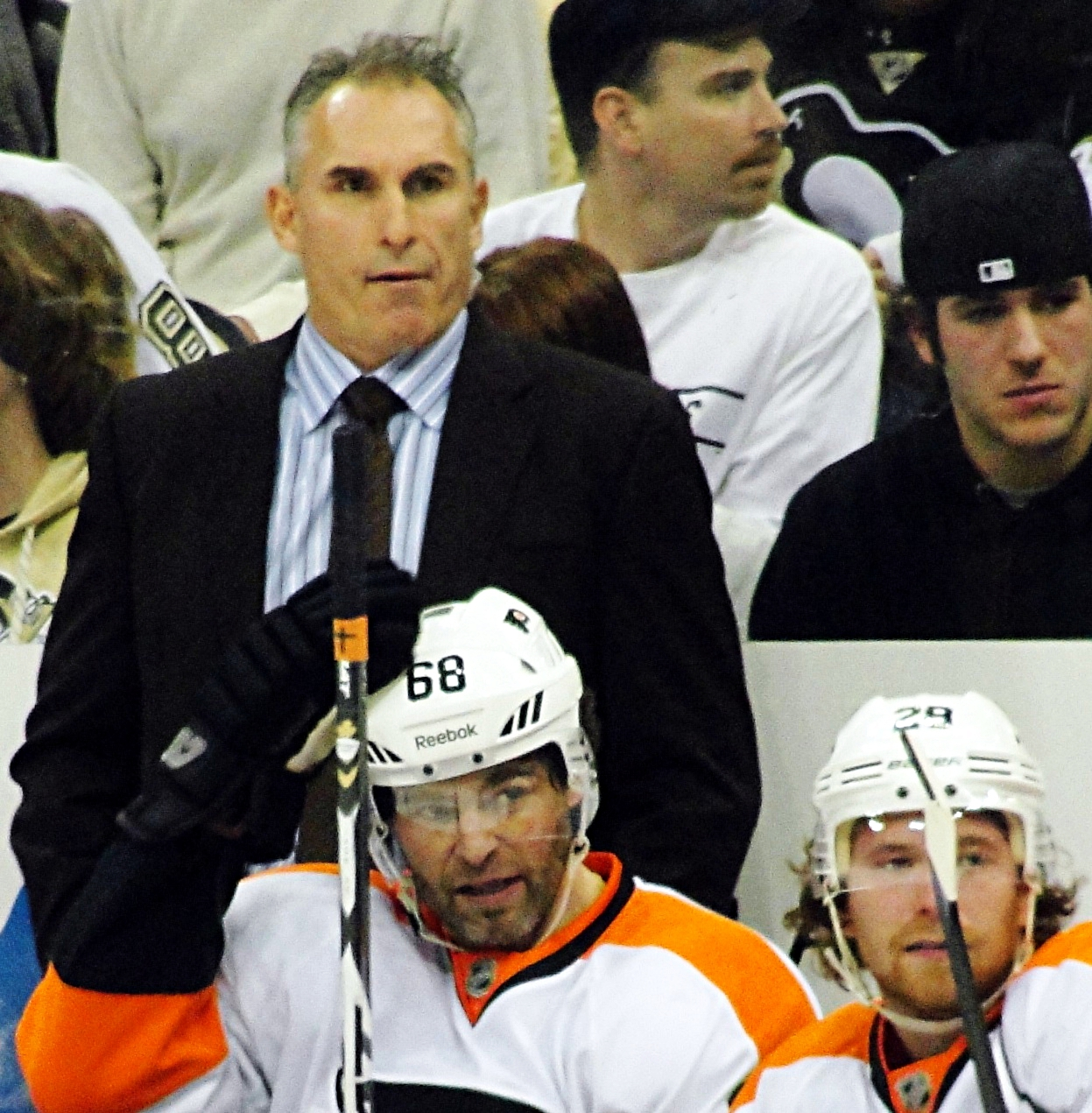
Craig Berube served two seasons as Flyers head coach.

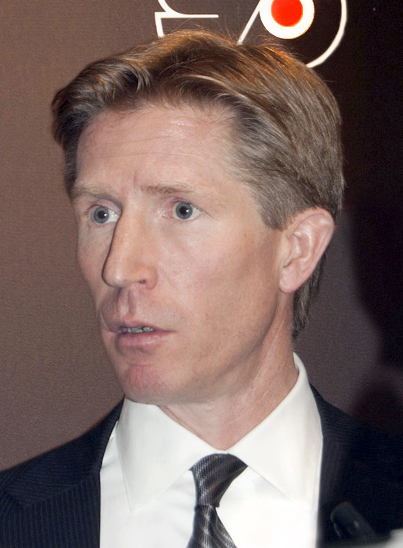
Dave Hakstol served four seasons as Flyers head coach.

== See also ==
- List of NHL head coaches
