= Bud Poile =

Canadian ice hockey player, coach and executive

- Hockey Hall of Fame, 1990 (Builder)
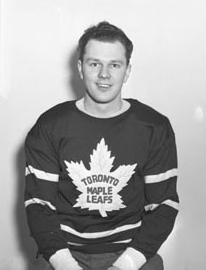
- Poile with the Toronto Maple Leafs in the 1940s
- Born: February 10, 1924 Fort William, Ontario, Canada
- Died: January 4, 2005 (aged 80) Vancouver, British Columbia, Canada
- Height: 6 ft 0 in (183 cm)
- Weight: 185 lb (84 kg; 13 st 3 lb)
- Position: Right wing
- Shot: Right
- Played for: Toronto Maple Leafs; Chicago Black Hawks; Detroit Red Wings; New York Rangers; Boston Bruins
- Playing career: 1942–1954

Norman Robert "Bud" Poile (February 10, 1924 – January 4, 2005) was a Canadian professional ice hockey player, coach, general manager, and league executive. Bud was the brother of Don Poile, and the father of David Poile.

== Overview ==
Poile was born in Fort William, Ontario, and played junior hockey for the Fort William Rangers. He began his professional career in 1942 as an 18-year-old right winger for the Toronto Maple Leafs and—after a break in his career to serve in the Second World War—was a member of the Leafs' Stanley Cup-winning team of 1947. The next season, he was traded to the Chicago Black Hawks in a multi-player deal for Max Bentley. A year later he was dealt to the Detroit Red Wings. Before the 1949–50 season he was acquired by the New York Rangers and was traded mid-season to the Boston Bruins, which would be his final stop in the NHL.

Poile would spend five more years playing in minor professional leagues as a player-coach, first for the Tulsa Oilers of the United States Hockey League in 1950–51. He then rejoined the Red Wings organization in 1951–52 as player coach of the Red Wings' Maritime Major Hockey League affiliate, the Glace Bay Miners. He moved up to the Wings' Western Hockey League affiliate, the Edmonton Flyers, in 1952–53. He retired as a player in 1954, but would continue to coach the Flyers until 1962. Poile then became head coach of the San Francisco Seals from 1962 to 1966.

With the NHL expansion in 1967, Poile became general manager of the Philadelphia Flyers, acquiring key members of the team that would win the Stanley Cup in the 1970s. In 1970, Poile became general manager of another NHL expansion team, the Vancouver Canucks, building that club until leaving in 1973 to join the World Hockey Association as executive vice-president. He left the WHA in May 1976 in the fallout from a brawl in the playoffs between Quebec and Calgary.

In August 1976, Poile became president of the Central Hockey League. During the 1983–84 season he also became commissioner of the International Hockey League. The CHL wound down its operations at the end of that season, and Poile continued in his role with the IHL until retiring in 1989.

Poile was inducted into the Hockey Hall of Fame as a builder in 1990 after a hockey career that spanned six decades. He died in Vancouver on January 4, 2005, of Parkinson's disease. His son, David Poile, has also had a long management career in the National Hockey League and was the first general manager of the Nashville Predators.

Poile has had two professional hockey trophies named after him. The first was the N.R. "Bud" Poile Trophy of the International Hockey League, awarded from 1989 to 2001 to the most valuable player of the Turner Cup Playoffs. The second is the Norman R. "Bud" Poile Trophy of the American Hockey League, awarded to the team that finishes the regular season with the best record in the Western Conference.

== Awards ==
- 2nd team NHL All-Star in 1948.
- Awarded the Lester Patrick Trophy in 1989.
- Inducted into the Hockey Hall of Fame in 1990.

== Career statistics ==
=== Regular season and playoffs ===
			Regular season					Playoffs
Season	Team	League	GP	G	A	Pts	PIM	GP	G	A	Pts	PIM
1940–41	Fort William Rangers	TBJHL	17	25	10	35	14	2	3	2	5	4
1941–42	Fort William Rangers	TBJHL	18	36	29	65	55	3	5	7	12	11
1941–42	Fort William Forts	TBSHL	1	0	2	2	0	—	—	—	—	—
1941–42	Port Arthur Bearcats	Al-Cup	—	—	—	—	—	6	1	2	3	2
1942–43	Toronto Maple Leafs	NHL	48	16	19	35	24	6	2	4	6	4
1943–44	Toronto Maple Leafs	NHL	11	6	8	14	9	—	—	—	—	—
1943–44	Toronto RCAF	OHA-Sr.	8	5	9	14	8	—	—	—	—	—
1943–44	Toronto Bowsers	TMHL	3	5	2	7	0	4	16	5	21	2
1945–46	Toronto Maple Leafs	NHL	9	1	8	9	0	—	—	—	—	—
1946–47	Toronto Maple Leafs	NHL	59	19	17	36	19	7	2	0	2	2
1947–48	Toronto Maple Leafs	NHL	4	2	0	2	3	—	—	—	—	—
1947–48	Chicago Black Hawks	NHL	54	23	29	52	17	—	—	—	—	—
1948–49	Chicago Black Hawks	NHL	4	0	0	0	2	—	—	—	—	—
1948–49	Detroit Red Wings	NHL	56	21	21	42	6	10	0	1	1	2
1949–50	New York Rangers	NHL	28	3	6	9	8	—	—	—	—	—
1949–50	Boston Bruins	NHL	38	16	14	30	6	—	—	—	—	—
1950–51	Tulsa Oilers	USHL	60	15	38	53	48	9	5	6	11	4
1951–52	Glace-Bay Miners	MMHL	84	33	60	93	69	2	0	0	0	0
1952–53	Edmonton Flyers	WHL	70	20	29	49	62	15	0	7	7	12
1953–54	Edmonton Flyers	WHL	49	12	39	51	34	13	3	9	12	0
1954–55	Edmonton Flyers	WHL	3	1	2	3	0	—	—	—	—	—
1954–55	Edmonton Flyers	Ed-Cup	—	—	—	—	—	1	0	0	0	0
NHL totals			311	107	122	229	91	23	4	5	9	8

== Coaching statistics ==
Season	Team	League	Type	G	W	L	T	OTL	Pct
1952–53	Edmonton Flyers	WHL	Head Coach	60	21	28	11	0	.442
1953–54	Edmonton Flyers	WHL	Head Coach	70	29	30	11	0	.493
1954–55	Edmonton Flyers	WHL	Head coach	70	39	20	11	0	.636
1955–56	Edmonton Flyers	WHL	Head Coach	70	33	34	3	0	.493
1956–57	Edmonton Flyers	WHL	Head Coach	70	39	27	4	0	.586
1957–58	Edmonton Flyers	WHL	Head Coach^{1}	—	—	—	—	—	—
1959–60	Edmonton Flyers	WHL	Head Coach	70	37	29	4	0	.557
1960–61	Edmonton Flyers	WHL	Head Coach	70	27	43	0	0	.386
1961–62	Edmonton Flyers	WHL	Head coach	70	39	27	4	0	.586
1962–63	San Francisco Seals	WHL	Head coach	70	44	25	1	0	.636
1963–64	San Francisco Seals	WHL	Head coach^{2}	—	—	—	—	—	—
1964–65	San Francisco Seals	WHL	Head Coach	70	31	37	2	0	.457
1965–66	San Francisco Seals	WHL	Head Coach²	—	—	—	—	—	—

^{1} Midseason replacement

² Replaced midseason

== See also ==
- Norman R. "Bud" Poile Trophy (AHL)
- Norman R. "Bud" Poile Trophy (IHL)

Preceded by Position created	General Manager of the Philadelphia Flyers; 1967–69	Succeeded by Keith Allen
Preceded by Position created	General Manager of the Vancouver Canucks; 1970–73	Succeeded by Hal Laycoe
