= John Stevens (ice hockey) =

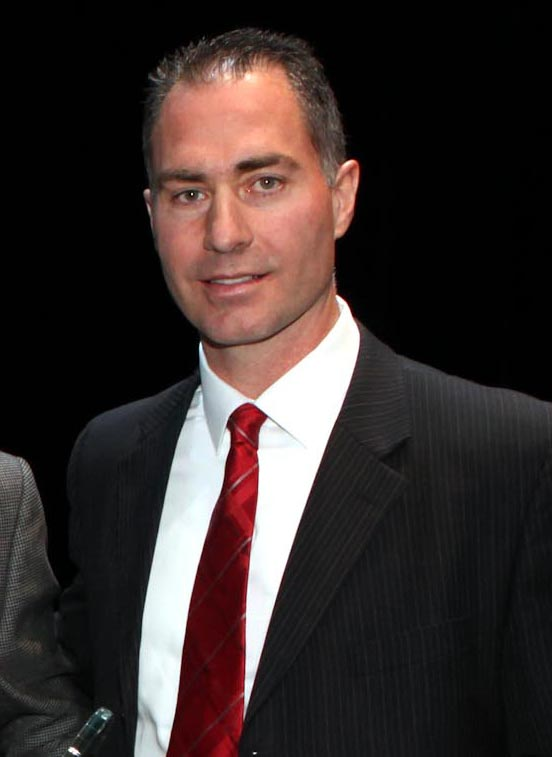
- Stevens in 2012
- Born: May 4, 1966 (age 60) Campbellton, New Brunswick, Canada
- Height: 6 ft 1 in (185 cm)
- Weight: 200 lb (91 kg; 14 st 4 lb)
- Position: Defence
- Shot: Left
- Played for: Philadelphia Flyers; Hartford Whalers
- Current NHL coach: Vegas Golden Knights (assistant)
- Coached for: Philadelphia Flyers; Los Angeles Kings
- NHL draft: 47th overall, 1984; Philadelphia Flyers
- Playing career: 1986–1999
- Coaching career: 1999–present

John A. Stevens (born May 4, 1966) is a Canadian professional ice hockey coach and former player who is the assistant coach for the Vegas Golden Knights. He is the former head coach of the Los Angeles Kings and the Philadelphia Flyers of the NHL. Stevens was a defenceman for the Flyers and Hartford Whalers during his playing career. He was born in Campbellton, New Brunswick, but grew up in Turkey Point in Norfolk County, Ontario.

== Playing career ==
Stevens was drafted by the Philadelphia Flyers in the third round, 47th overall, of the 1984 NHL entry draft. Stevens followed up a junior career with the Oshawa Generals in the Ontario Hockey League (OHL) by playing four seasons for the Hershey Bears of the AHL. He was called up to the NHL level at times during the 1986–87 and 1987–88 seasons, playing in a total of 9 games with the Flyers. He was signed by the Hartford Whalers in 1990 and reassigned to the Whalers' AHL team, the Springfield Indians. Stevens was named team captain that year and went on to win the Calder Cup with the team that same year for the franchise's seventh Championship title. With the Indians' franchise moving to Worcester, Massachusetts in 1994, Stevens became the first captain of the successor franchise, the Springfield Falcons, where he played for two additional years.

In 1996, Stevens signed once more with the Flyers, and was named the first captain of its expansion farm team, the Philadelphia Phantoms. The Phantoms won their first Calder Cup in his second season as captain.

Stevens played in 53 NHL games for the Flyers and the Whalers scoring no goals, ten assists and recording 48 penalty minutes. In the AHL, he played in 834 games, scoring 20 goals and 166 assists for 186 points. Ironically, given his low scoring output as a defensive defenceman, Stevens scored the first goals in franchise history for both the Falcons and the Phantoms.

== Coaching career ==
Stevens was forced to retire as a player in 1999 due to a career-ending eye injury, but remained with the Phantoms as an assistant coach. He then became the club's second head coach in 2000 when Bill Barber was promoted to the Flyers. During his six-season tenure as coach, the Phantoms made the playoffs four times and won their second Calder Cup title in 2005. Stevens was himself promoted to the Phantoms' parent club as an assistant coach after the 2005–06 season, and on October 22, 2006, was named as head coach of the Philadelphia Flyers after Ken Hitchcock was fired. On October 26, Stevens coached his first NHL game, a 3–2 win over the Atlanta Thrashers. On November 20, the Flyers announced that they had signed Stevens to a 2-year contract.

His first season with the Flyers saw his team set a franchise record for consecutive losses (10 games) and finish the 2006–07 season with the club's worst record in its 40-year history. The Flyers set an NHL record for the biggest drop off in points from one season to the next – 101 points in the 2005–06 season to 56 points in the 2006–07 season for lowest point total in the league.

However, as stunning as their fall from grace was the previous season, Stevens guided the Flyers to an immediate renaissance in 2007–08. The Flyers won 42 games and amassed 95 points in the regular season under Stevens's guidance. In the playoffs, the Flyers beat the Washington Capitals in the first round and upset the top-seeded Montreal Canadiens in the second round before falling to the Pittsburgh Penguins in the Eastern Conference Final. For this, The Hockey News honored Stevens with their Coach of the Year award.

Stevens was fired by the Flyers on December 4, 2009, after a 13–11–1 start and with a team expected to be a Stanley Cup favorite sitting in 10th place in the Eastern Conference.

On June 24, 2010, he was signed to a three-year contract to be an assistant coach for the Los Angeles Kings, joining former Flyers coach Terry Murray as well as former Flyers player Ron Hextall in the Kings organization.

During the 2011–12 season, after Kings coach Terry Murray was fired, Stevens acted as interim head coach for 4 games before Darryl Sutter took over. He then returned to his post as Assistant Coach, a position he held when the Kings won their first Stanley Cup in franchise history at the season's end. The Kings again won the Stanley Cup in 2014 with Stevens as an assistant behind the bench.

On June 18, 2014, he re-signed with Kings and was promoted to associate head coach.

On April 23, 2017, Stevens was named the head coach of the Los Angeles Kings. In his first season as the head coach of the Kings, he guided the Kings back to the playoffs as the first wild card in the Western Conference, but they were swept by the Vegas Golden Knights in the first round. On November 4, 2018, the Kings fired Stevens after a 4–8–1 start to the 2018–19 season.

He later became assistant coach for the Dallas Stars, a position he left on May 20, 2022. On June 28, 2022, he joined the coaching staff of the Vegas Golden Knights as an assistant coach. He then won a third Stanley Cup on June 13, 2023.

== Personal life ==
Stevens grew up in the lakeside village of Turkey Point, Ontario. His three brothers also played hockey, and his brother Larry Stevens played briefly with the Sudbury Wolves of the Ontario Hockey League.

Stevens has two sons who also play hockey. His eldest son, also named John, played high school hockey for Salisbury School in Connecticut and one season with the Dubuque Fighting Saints in the United States Hockey League (USHL) before playing college hockey for the Northeastern University Huskies hockey team. John Jr. signed with the New York Islanders of the NHL after finishing his college career and is currently playing on their AHL affiliate team, the Bridgeport Sound Tigers. John's younger son, Nolan Stevens, played for the US National Development Team in the USHL, before joining his brother at Northeastern. Nolan Stevens was drafted in the 5th round, 125th overall of the 2016 NHL entry draft by the St. Louis Blues. Stevens resides in Sea Isle City, New Jersey in the summer.

== Career statistics ==
			Regular season					Playoffs
Season	Team	League	GP	G	A	Pts	PIM	GP	G	A	Pts	PIM
1982–83	Newmarket Flyers	OPJHL	48	2	9	11	111	—	—	—	—	—
1983–84	Oshawa Generals	OHL	70	1	10	11	71	7	0	1	1	6
1984–85	Oshawa Generals	OHL	45	2	10	12	61	5	0	2	2	4
1984–85	Hershey Bears	AHL	3	0	0	0	2	—	—	—	—	—
1985–86	Oshawa Generals	OHL	65	1	7	8	146	6	0	2	2	14
1985–86	Kalamazoo Wings	IHL	6	0	1	1	8	6	0	3	3	9
1986–87	Hershey Bears	AHL	63	1	15	16	131	3	0	0	0	7
1986–87	Philadelphia Flyers	NHL	6	0	2	2	14	—	—	—	—	—
1987–88	Hershey Bears	AHL	59	1	15	16	108	—	—	—	—	—
1987–88	Philadelphia Flyers	NHL	3	0	0	0	0	—	—	—	—	—
1988–89	Hershey Bears	AHL	78	3	13	16	129	12	1	1	2	29
1989–90	Hershey Bears	AHL	79	3	10	13	193	—	—	—	—	—
1990–91	Springfield Indians	AHL	65	0	12	12	139	18	0	6	6	35
1990–91	Hartford Whalers	NHL	14	0	1	1	11	—	—	—	—	—
1991–92	Springfield Indians	AHL	45	1	12	13	73	11	1	3	4	27
1991–92	Hartford Whalers	NHL	21	0	4	4	19	—	—	—	—	—
1992–93	Springfield Indians	AHL	74	1	19	20	111	15	0	1	1	18
1993–94	Springfield Indians	AHL	71	3	9	12	85	3	0	0	0	0
1993–94	Hartford Whalers	NHL	9	0	3	3	4	—	—	—	—	—
1994–95	Springfield Falcons	AHL	79	5	15	20	122	—	—	—	—	—
1995–96	Springfield Falcons	AHL	69	0	19	19	95	10	0	1	1	31
1996–97	Philadelphia Phantoms	AHL	74	2	18	20	116	10	0	2	2	8
1997–98	Philadelphia Phantoms	AHL	50	1	9	10	76	20	0	6	6	44
1998–99	Philadelphia Phantoms	AHL	25	0	1	1	19	—	—	—	—	—
AHL totals			834	21	167	188	1399	102	2	20	22	199
NHL totals			53	0	10	10	48	—	—	—	—	—

== Coaching record ==
=== NHL ===
Team	Year	Regular season						Postseason			
Team	Year	G	W	L	OTL	Pts	Finish	W	L	Win %	Result
PHI	2006–07	74	21	42	11	(56)	5th in Atlantic	—	—	—	Missed playoffs
PHI	2007–08	82	42	29	11	95	4th in Atlantic	9	8	.529	Lost in Conference Final (PIT)
PHI	2008–09	82	44	27	11	99	third in Atlantic	2	4	.333	Lost in Conference Quarterfinal (PIT)
PHI	2009–10	25	13	11	1	(88)	(fired)	—	—	—	—
PHI total		263	120	109	34	338		11	12	.478	2 playoff appearances
LAK	2011–12	4	2	2	0	(95)	(interim)	—	—	—	—
LAK total		4	2	2	0	95				–	
LAK	2017–18	82	45	29	8	98	4th in Pacific	0	4	.000	Lost in First Round (VGK)
LAK	2018–19	13	4	8	1	(9)	(fired)	—	—	—	—
LAK total		95	49	37	9	107		0	4	.000	1 playoff appearance
Total		362	171	148	43	385		11	16	.407	3 playoff appearances

=== AHL ===
Team	Year	Regular season							Postseason
Team	Year	G	W	L	T	OTL	Pts	Finish	Result
PHI	2000–01	80	36	34	5	5	82	4th in Mid-Atlantic	Lost in Division Final
PHI	2001–02	80	33	27	15	5	86	third in South	Lost in Conference Quarterfinal
PHI	2002–03	80	33	33	6	8	80	4th in South	Missed playoffs
PHI	2003–04	80	46	25	7	2	101	1st in East	Lost in Division Final
PHI	2004–05	80	48	25	3	4	103	second in East	Won Calder Cup
PHI	2005–06	80	34	37	2	7	77	6th in South	Missed playoffs
Total		480	230	181	33	25			

== Awards and records ==
=== Awards ===
Player

- Calder Cup champion (1988, 1991, 1998)
- AHL All-Star Game (1996)

Coach

- 2005 – Calder Cup champion (2005)
- 2007 – Philadelphia Phantoms Hall of Fame inductee
- 2008 – The Hockey News Coach of the Year
- Stanley Cup champion (2012, 2014, 2023)

=== Records ===
Player

- Scored first goal in Springfield Falcons history (1994)
- Scored first goal in Philadelphia Phantoms history (1996)

Coach

- Worst season record in Philadelphia Flyers history (21–42–11 in 2006–07)
- NHL record for the biggest drop off in points from one season to the next (101 points in the 2005–06 season to 56 points in the 2006–07 season)

Sporting positions
Preceded by Ken Hitchcock	Head coach of the Philadelphia Flyers; 2006–2009	Succeeded by Peter Laviolette
Preceded by Terry Murray	Head coach of the Los Angeles Kings (interim); 2011	Succeeded by Darryl Sutter
Preceded by Darryl Sutter	Head coach of the Los Angeles Kings; 2017–2018	Succeeded by Willie Desjardins (interim)
