= 1994–95 Philadelphia Flyers season =

NHL hockey team season

1994–95 Philadelphia Flyers
- Atlantic Division champions
- Division: 1st Atlantic
- Conference: 2nd Eastern
- 1994–95 record: 28–16–4
- Home record: 16–7–1
- Road record: 12–9–3
- Goals for: 150
- Goals against: 132

Team information
- General manager: Bob Clarke
- Coach: Terry Murray
- Captain: Eric Lindros
- Alternate captains: Rod Brind'Amour; Craig MacTavish
- Arena: CoreStates Spectrum
- Average attendance: 17,160
- Minor league affiliates: Hershey Bears; Johnstown Chiefs

Team leaders
- Goals: Eric Lindros (29)
- Assists: Eric Lindros (41)
- Points: Eric Lindros (70)
- Penalty minutes: Shawn Antoski (61)
- Plus/minus: Eric Lindros (+27)
- Wins: Ron Hextall (17)
- Goals against average: Dominic Roussel (2.34)

The 1994–95 Philadelphia Flyers season was the franchise's 28th season in the National Hockey League (NHL). The Flyers made the playoffs for the first time since 1988–89, also winning their division for the first time since 1987, and made it to the Eastern Conference finals before losing in six games to the eventual champion New Jersey Devils.

== Off-season ==
Bob Clarke was named president and general manager of the Flyers on June 15, 1994, replacing Russ Farwell. The Florida Panthers received the Flyers' 1994 second-round pick and cash, believed to be around $500,000, as compensation since Clarke had to be released from his contract. On June 24, Clarke hired Terry Murray to replace Terry Simpson as head coach. A former Flyers player, Murray had mostly recently coached the Cincinnati Cyclones of the International Hockey League after being fired midway through the 1993–94 season as the Washington Capitals head coach. Prior to the start of training camp, the team announced Eric Lindros was replacing Kevin Dineen as team captain.

The Flyers made three major player transactions during the off-season prior to the beginning of the 1994–95 NHL lockout. On June 29, the Flyers swapped defensemen with the Montreal Canadiens, sending Yves Racine to Montreal for Kevin Haller. On July 6, unrestricted free agent centerman Craig MacTavish, formerly of the Stanley Cup champion New York Rangers, was signed to a two-year, $1.6 million contract. On September 22, the Flyers re-acquired goaltender Ron Hextall, whom they had traded in 1992 to the Quebec Nordiques in the Lindros trade, from the New York Islanders for goaltender Tommy Soderstrom.

== Regular season ==
After a 3–6–1 start to the season, including a shutout loss to Ottawa on February 6, Clarke dealt high-scoring winger Mark Recchi to the Montreal Canadiens for Eric Desjardins, Gilbert Dionne and John LeClair. In the following game, at home against Florida, the team lost 3–0, but Lindros and LeClair was placed on a line with sophomore forward Mikael Renberg to form the "Legion of Doom" line, a mix of scoring talent and physical intimidation. The line registered its first point on Saturday, February 11, 1995, in a game against the New Jersey Devils at the Meadowlands. The line made an immediate impact, as it helped the Flyers defeat the Devils 3–1.

Less than two weeks later, on Thursday, February 23, Lindros recorded a hat trick in what would be his final game in Quebec City against the Nordiques, but the Flyers wasted a three-goal lead into a 6–6 tie. Two nights later in Montreal, LeClair blitzed his former club in his return with a hat-trick in a 7–0 rout which saw the Flyers score five times in the third period. LeClair's previous hat trick had come just 11 days earlier in a 5–2 Flyers' win at Tampa Bay. Lindros recorded two more hat tricks during the regular season, and both came in consecutive games; his second one on March 18 in a 4–3 Flyers' overtime win in Florida, and the third on March 20 in an 8–4 Flyers' win over the Montreal Canadiens. Josef Beranek had the other Flyers' regular-season hat trick in a 5–4 overtime loss to the New York Islanders on February 2.

During the season, the Flyers had two long winning streaks: one was eight games from March 5–20, the other was nine games from April 2–22. The final contest in that streak, on April 22 at New Jersey, saw LeClair net the overtime winner which clinched the Atlantic Division. Even though it was scored 54 seconds into the overtime period, it would prove to be the fastest overtime goal scored in the lockout-shortened regular season.

The end of the season saw Lindros go down with an eye injury in the penultimate game against the New York Rangers, as a shot he took ricocheted off Rangers defenseman Jeff Beukeboom and struck him in the face.

The playoff drought was finally over as the Flyers won their first division title in eight years and clinched the No.2 seed in the Eastern Conference.

Lindros, who scored 70 points, came in second to Jaromir Jagr by a tiebreaker in the race for the Art Ross Trophy, the NHL scoring championship, but was awarded the Hart Memorial Trophy as the league's MVP.

=== Season standings ===
Atlantic Division
No.	CR		GP	W	L	T	GF	GA	Pts
1	2	**Philadelphia Flyers**	48	28	16	4	150	132	60
2	5	**New Jersey Devils**	48	22	18	8	136	121	52
3	6	**Washington Capitals**	48	22	18	8	136	120	52
4	8	**New York Rangers**	48	22	23	3	139	134	47
5	9	Florida Panthers	48	20	22	6	115	127	46
6	12	Tampa Bay Lightning	48	17	28	3	120	144	37
7	13	New York Islanders	48	15	28	5	126	158	35

Note: No. = Division rank, CR = Conference rank, W = Wins, L = Losses, T = Ties, GF = Goals For, GA = Goals Against, Pts = Points
Teams that qualified for the playoffs are highlighted in bold.

Eastern Conference
R		Div	GP	W	L	T	GF	GA	Pts
**1**	**Quebec Nordiques**	**NE**	**48**	**30**	**13**	**5**	**185**	**134**	65
**2**	**Philadelphia Flyers**	**AT**	**48**	**28**	**16**	**4**	**150**	**132**	60
**3**	**Pittsburgh Penguins**	**NE**	**48**	**29**	**16**	**3**	**181**	**158**	61
**4**	**Boston Bruins**	**NE**	**48**	**27**	**18**	**3**	**150**	**127**	57
**5**	**New Jersey Devils**	**AT**	**48**	**22**	**18**	**8**	**136**	**121**	52
**6**	**Washington Capitals**	**AT**	**48**	**22**	**18**	**8**	**136**	**120**	52
**7**	**Buffalo Sabres**	**NE**	**48**	**22**	**19**	**7**	**130**	**119**	51
**8**	**New York Rangers**	**AT**	**48**	**22**	**23**	**3**	**139**	**134**	47
9	Florida Panthers	AT	48	20	22	6	115	127	46
10	Hartford Whalers	NE	48	19	24	5	127	141	43
11	Montreal Canadiens	NE	48	18	23	7	125	148	43
12	Tampa Bay Lightning	AT	48	17	28	3	120	144	37
13	New York Islanders	AT	48	15	28	5	126	158	35
14	Ottawa Senators	NE	48	9	34	5	117	174	23

Divisions: AT – Atlantic, NE – Northeast

bold – Qualified for playoffs

== Playoffs ==
Lindros missed the first three games of the Flyers' Eastern Conference quarterfinal series against the Buffalo Sabres. Karl Dykhuis netted the overtime winner in Game 1 and the club took a 2–0 series lead on the road. Following a narrow Game 3 defeat at The Aud, Lindros returned and the reunited Legion led the club to a 4–2 win. In Game 5, Philly rolled to leads of 4–0 and 5–2 before closing with a 6–4 victory.

More overtime magic came in the semifinal series with the defending Stanley Cup champion Rangers, who upset the Nordiques in the first round. Game 1 at the Spectrum saw New York race out to a 3–1 lead, only to see the Flyers storm back to go up 4–3. A late goal from Pat Verbeek sent the game into an extra session, where Desjardins won it with a right-circle shot.

The next night, Brian Leetch recorded a hat-trick but Kevin Haller struck with under 30 seconds played in OT off a feed from Renberg to give the Flyers a 4–3 win and 2–0 series edge. The Flyers capitalized on multiple mistakes and turnovers in Games 3 and 4 at Madison Square Garden, recording 5-2 and 4-1 victories to sweep the series.

The Flyers advanced to the conference finals against the Devils. Jersey controlled long stretches of the first two games, winning 4–1 in Game 1 and overcoming an early deficit with a four-goal blitz to take Game 2, 5–2. The Devils were on the verge of going up three games to none at the Meadowlands, but a Rod Brind'Amour floater in the third period and Lindros' wrister in overtime brought the Flyers back. Philly controlled Game 4 and coasted to a 4–2 win, but the Devils continued to use the neutral zone trap to control the Legion in Game 5. Although Dineen scored early in the third to tie the game, Claude Lemieux's 50-foot blast got by Hextall and gave New Jersey the shocking 3–2 win and left the Devils one win away from the 1995 Stanley Cup Final.

In Game 6, Jim Montgomery got the Flyers on the board early in the first period, but the Devils stormed back with four consecutive scores to ice the game and the series 4–2.

== Schedule and results ==
=== Regular season ===
1994–95 regular season
January: 2–4–1 (home: 2–1–0; road: 0–3–1)

Game	Date	Score	Opponent	Decision	Attendance	Record	Points	Recap
1	January 21	1–3	Quebec Nordiques	Hextall	17,380	0–1–0	0	L
2	January 22	1–4	@ Boston Bruins	Roussel	14,448	0–2–0	0	L
3	January 24	3–4	@ New York Islanders	Hextall	11,487	0–3–0	0	L
4	January 26	3–2	Hartford Whalers	Roussel	16,557	1–3–0	2	W
5	January 28	2–1	Boston Bruins	Roussel	17,260	2–3–0	4	W
6	January 29	2–2 OT	@ Montreal Canadiens	Hextall	16,152	2–3–1	5	T
7	January 31	2–5	@ Quebec Nordiques	Hextall	14,141	2–4–1	5	L

February: 6–4–1 (home: 3–3–0; road: 3–1–1)

Game	Date	Score	Opponent	Decision	Attendance	Record	Points	Recap
8	February 2	4–5 OT	New York Islanders	Roussel	16,519	2–5–1	5	L
9	February 4	4–2	Buffalo Sabres	Roussel	16,778	3–5–1	7	W
10	February 6	0–3	@ Ottawa Senators	Roussel	9,267	3–6–1	7	L
11	February 9	0–3	Florida Panthers	Roussel	16,229	3–7–1	7	L
12	February 11	3–1	@ New Jersey Devils	Roussel	19,040	4–7–1	9	W
13	February 13	5–3	Washington Capitals	Hextall	16,815	5–7–1	11	W
14	February 14	5–2	@ Tampa Bay Lightning	Roussel	16,699	6–7–1	13	W
15	February 16	2–4	Quebec Nordiques	Hextall	17,065	6–8–1	13	L
16	February 23	6–6 OT	@ Quebec Nordiques	Hextall	13,301	6–8–2	14	T
17	February 25	7–0	@ Montreal Canadiens	Hextall	17,800	7–8–2	16	W
18	February 28	4–2	Washington Capitals	Hextall	17,380	8–8–2	18	W

March: 9–4–2 (home: 5–1–1; road: 4–3–1)

Game	Date	Score	Opponent	Decision	Attendance	Record	Points	Recap
19	March 2	2–2 OT	Florida Panthers	Hextall	16,680	8–8–3	19	T
20	March 3	3–5	@ New York Rangers	Hextall	18,200	8–9–3	19	L
21	March 5	6–2	Pittsburgh Penguins	Hextall	17,380	9–9–3	21	W
22	March 7	4–3	@ Tampa Bay Lightning	Hextall	21,827	10–9–3	23	W
23	March 9	3–2	Boston Bruins	Hextall	17,380	11–9–3	25	W
24	March 12	4–3	New Jersey Devils	Hextall	17,380	12–9–3	27	W
25	March 15	4–3	@ New York Rangers	Roussel	18,200	13–9–3	29	W
26	March 16	3–1	@ Ottawa Senators	Hextall	10,382	14–9–3	31	W
27	March 18	4–3 OT	@ Florida Panthers	Roussel	14,703	15–9–3	33	W
28	March 20	8–4	Montreal Canadiens	Hextall	17,380	16–9–3	35	W
29	March 22	3–4	@ Hartford Whalers	Hextall	10,149	16–10–3	35	L
30	March 25	2–2 OT	@ Washington Capitals	Hextall	16,721	16–10–4	36	T
31	March 26	3–1	Buffalo Sabres	Roussel	17,380	17–10–4	38	W
32	March 28	1–5	@ Boston Bruins	Roussel	14,448	17–11–4	38	L
33	March 30	3–4	New Jersey Devils	Hextall	17,380	17–12–4	38	L

April: 10–4–0 (home: 6–2–0; road: 4–2–0)

Game	Date	Score	Opponent	Decision	Attendance	Record	Points	Recap
34	April 1	2–3	@ Pittsburgh Penguins	Hextall	17,181	17–13–4	38	L
35	April 2	4–2	New York Rangers	Hextall	17,380	18–13–4	40	W
36	April 6	5–4	Tampa Bay Lightning	Hextall	17,245	19–13–4	42	W
37	April 8	3–1	@ Washington Capitals	Hextall	18,130	20–13–4	44	W
38	April 12	3–2	Montreal Canadiens	Hextall	17,380	21–13–4	46	W
39	April 14	3–2	Tampa Bay Lightning	Roussel	17,380	22–13–4	48	W
40	April 16	4–3 OT	Pittsburgh Penguins	Hextall	17,380	23–13–4	50	W
41	April 18	3–1	@ Florida Panthers	Hextall	14,703	24–13–4	52	W
42	April 20	2–1	New York Islanders	Hextall	17,380	25–13–4	54	W
43	April 22	4–3 OT	@ New Jersey Devils	Roussel	19,040	26–13–4	56	W
44	April 23	2–4	@ Buffalo Sabres	Hextall	16,230	26–14–4	56	L
45	April 26	2–5	Ottawa Senators	Hextall	17,380	26–15–4	56	L
46	April 28	4–3	@ Hartford Whalers	Hextall	15,550	27–15–4	58	W
47	April 30	0–2	New York Rangers	Roussel	17,380	27–16–4	58	L

May: 1–0–0 (home: 0–0–0; road: 1–0–0)

Game	Date	Score	Opponent	Decision	Attendance	Record	Points	Recap
48	May 2	2–0	@ New York Islanders	Roussel	12,621	28–16–4	60	W

Legend: W Win (2 points) L Loss (0 points) T Tie (1 point)

=== Playoffs ===
1995 Stanley Cup playoffs
Eastern Conference quarterfinals vs. Buffalo Sabres – Flyers win 4–1

Game	Date	Score	Opponent	Decision	Attendance	Series	Recap
1	May 7	4–3 OT	Buffalo Sabres	Hextall	17,380	Flyers lead 1–0	W
2	May 8	3–1	Buffalo Sabres	Hextall	17,380	Flyers lead 2–0	W
3	May 10	1–3	@ Buffalo Sabres	Hextall	13,256	Flyers lead 2–1	L
4	May 12	4–2	@ Buffalo Sabres	Hextall	16,230	Flyers lead 3–1	W
5	May 14	6–4	Buffalo Sabres	Hextall	17,380	Flyers win 4–1	W

Eastern Conference semifinals vs. New York Rangers – Flyers win 4–0

Game	Date	Score	Opponent	Decision	Attendance	Series	Recap
1	May 21	5–4 OT	New York Rangers	Hextall	17,380	Flyers lead 1–0	W
2	May 22	4–3 OT	New York Rangers	Hextall	17,380	Flyers lead 2–0	W
3	May 24	5–2	@ New York Rangers	Hextall	18,200	Flyers lead 3–0	W
4	May 26	4–1	@ New York Rangers	Hextall	18,200	Flyers win 4–0	W

Eastern Conference finals vs. New Jersey Devils – Devils win 4–2

Game	Date	Score	Opponent	Decision	Attendance	Series	Recap
1	June 3	1–4	New Jersey Devils	Hextall	17,380	Devils lead 1–0	L
2	June 5	2–5	New Jersey Devils	Hextall	17,380	Devils lead 2–0	L
3	June 7	3–2 OT	@ New Jersey Devils	Hextall	19,040	Devils lead 2–1	W
4	June 10	4–2	@ New Jersey Devils	Hextall	19,040	Series tied 2–2	W
5	June 11	2–3	New Jersey Devils	Hextall	17,380	Devils lead 3–2	L
6	June 13	2–4	@ New Jersey Devils	Hextall	19,040	Devils win 4–2	L

Legend: W Win L Loss

== Player statistics ==
=== Scoring ===
- Position abbreviations: C = Center; D = Defense; G = Goaltender; LW = Left wing; RW = Right wing
- † = Joined team via a transaction (e.g., trade, waivers, signing) during the season. Stats reflect time with the Flyers only.
- ‡ = Left team via a transaction (e.g., trade, waivers, release) during the season. Stats reflect time with the Flyers only.

No.	Player	Pos	Regular season						Playoffs					
No.	Player	Pos	GP	G	A	Pts	+/-	PIM	GP	G	A	Pts	+/-	PIM
88	Eric Lindros	C	46	29	41	70	27	60	12	4	11	15	7	8
19	Mikael Renberg	RW	47	26	31	57	20	20	15	6	7	13	5	6
10	John LeClair†	LW	37	25	24	49	21	20	15	5	7	12	7	4
17	Rod Brind'Amour	C	48	12	27	39	−4	33	15	6	9	15	5	8
37	Eric Desjardins†	D	34	5	18	23	10	12	15	4	4	8	13	10
3	Garry Galley‡	D	33	2	20	22	0	20	—	—	—	—	—	—
2	Dmitri Yushkevich	D	40	5	9	14	−4	47	15	1	5	6	−2	12
11	Kevin Dineen	RW	40	8	5	13	−1	39	15	6	4	10	2	18
6	Chris Therien	D	48	3	10	13	8	38	15	0	0	0	−2	10
18	Brent Fedyk	RW	30	8	4	12	−2	14	9	2	2	4	2	8
14	Craig MacTavish	C	45	3	9	12	2	23	15	1	4	5	−3	20
42	Josef Beranek‡	C	14	5	5	10	3	2	—	—	—	—	—	—
25	Shjon Podein	LW	44	3	7	10	−2	33	15	1	3	4	2	10
5	Kevin Haller	D	36	2	8	10	16	48	15	4	4	8	10	10
24	Karl Dykhuis†	D	33	2	6	8	7	37	15	4	4	8	2	14
12	Patrik Juhlin	RW	42	4	3	7	−13	6	13	1	0	1	−1	2
45	Gilbert Dionne†	LW	20	0	6	6	−1	2	3	0	0	0	−1	4
8	Mark Recchi‡	RW	10	2	3	5	−6	12	—	—	—	—	—	—
9	Rob DiMaio	LW	36	3	1	4	8	53	15	2	4	6	3	4
21	Dave Brown	RW	28	1	2	3	−1	53	3	0	0	0	0	0
44 (Note: Semenov wore number 34 in his first game.)	Anatoli Semenov†	C	26	1	2	3	−2	6	15	2	4	6	3	0
23 (Note: Svoboda wore number 3 in his first game.)	Petr Svoboda†	D	11	0	3	3	0	10	15	1	3	4	5	8
22	Jim Montgomery†	C	8	1	1	2	−2	6	7	1	0	1	2	2
22	Mark Lamb‡	C	8	0	2	2	1	2	—	—	—	—	—	—
20	Rob Zettler	D	32	0	1	1	−3	34	1	0	0	0	1	2
37	Shawn Anderson	D	1	0	0	0	0	0	—	—	—	—	—	—
8	Shawn Antoski†	LW	25	0	0	0	0	61	13	0	1	1	1	10
28	Jason Bowen	D	4	0	0	0	−2	0	—	—	—	—	—	—
15	Yanick Dupre	LW	22	0	0	0	−7	8	—	—	—	—	—	—
27	Ron Hextall	G	31	0	0	0		13	15	0	1	1		4
23	Stewart Malgunas	D	4	0	0	0	−1	4	—	—	—	—	—	—
29	Ryan McGill‡	D	12	0	0	0	0	13	—	—	—	—	—	—
33	Dominic Roussel	G	19	0	0	0		6	1	0	0	0		0

=== Goaltending ===
No.	Player	Regular season											Playoffs									
No.	Player	GP	GS	W	L	T	SA	GA	GAA	SV%	SO	TOI	GP	GS	W	L	SA	GA	GAA	SV%	SO	TOI
27	Ron Hextall	31	31	17	9	4	801	88	2.90	.890	1	1,824	15	15	10	5	437	42	2.81	.904	0	897
33	Dominic Roussel	19	17	11	7	0	486	42	2.34	.914	1	1,075	1	0	0	0	8	0	0.00	1.000	0	23

== Awards and records ==
=== Awards ===
Type	Award/honor	Recipient	Ref
League (annual)	Hart Memorial Trophy	Eric Lindros	
League (annual)	Lester B. Pearson Award	Eric Lindros	
League (annual)	NHL All-Rookie Team	Chris Therien (Defense)	
League (annual)	NHL first All-Star team	John LeClair (Left wing)	
League (annual)	NHL first All-Star team	Eric Lindros (Center)	
League (in-season)	NHL Player of the Week	John LeClair (February 27)	
League (in-season)	NHL Player of the Week	Eric Lindros (March 20)	
Team	Barry Ashbee Trophy	Eric Desjardins	
Team	Bobby Clarke Trophy	Eric Lindros	
Team	Class Guy Award	Mikael Renberg	
Team	Pelle Lindbergh Memorial Trophy	John LeClair	
Miscellaneous	Viking Award	Mikael Renberg	

=== Records ===
The Flyers qualified for the Stanley Cup playoffs for the first time since 1989, ending a franchise record five-year playoff drought. Goaltender Ron Hextall tied a team record for consecutive playoff wins (6) from May 12 to May 26. The team's five consecutive road wins from May 12 to June 10 set a team playoff record (subsequently tied).

=== Milestones ===
Milestone	Player	Date	Ref
First game	Patrik Juhlin	January 21, 1995	
First game	Chris Therien	January 21, 1995	

== Transactions ==
The Flyers were involved in the following transactions from June 15, 1994, the day after the deciding game of the 1994 Stanley Cup Final, through June 24, 1995, the day of the deciding game of the 1995 Stanley Cup Final.

=== Trades ===
Date	Details		Ref
June 15, 1994 (Note: Florida received the draft pick and cash as compensation for the Flyers hiring Clarke as president and general manager. Clarke, who had been serving as the vice president and general manager of the Panthers, had two years remaining on his contract.)	To Philadelphia Flyers: Bobby Clarke	To Florida Panthers: 2nd-round pick in 1994; cash	
June 29, 1994	To Philadelphia Flyers: Kevin Haller	To Montreal Canadiens: Yves Racine	
September 6, 1994	To Philadelphia Flyers: Philadelphia's 4th-round pick in 1995	To Tampa Bay Lightning: Rights to Alexander Selivanov	
September 22, 1994	To Philadelphia Flyers: Ron Hextall; 6th-round pick in 1995	To New York Islanders: Tommy Soderstrom	
February 2, 1995	To Philadelphia Flyers: Mike Greenlay	To Tampa Bay Lightning: Scott LaGrand	
February 9, 1995	To Philadelphia Flyers: Eric Desjardins; Gilbert Dionne; John LeClair	To Montreal Canadiens: Mark Recchi; 3rd-round pick in 1995	
February 10, 1995	To Philadelphia Flyers: cash	To Montreal Canadiens: Mark Lamb	
February 15, 1995	To Philadelphia Flyers: Shawn Antoski	To Vancouver Canucks: Josef Beranek	
February 16, 1995	To Philadelphia Flyers: Karl Dykhuis	To Chicago Blackhawks: Bob Wilkie; 5th-round pick in 1997	
March 8, 1995	To Philadelphia Flyers: Anatoli Semenov	To Anaheim Mighty Ducks: Milos Holan	
March 13, 1995	To Philadelphia Flyers: Brad Zavisha; 6th-round pick in 1995	To Edmonton Oilers: Ryan McGill	
April 7, 1995	To Philadelphia Flyers: Petr Svoboda	To Buffalo Sabres: Garry Galley	

=== Players acquired ===
Date	Player	Former team	Term	Via	Ref
July 6, 1994	Craig MacTavish	New York Rangers	2-year	Free agency	
July 19, 1994	Phil Crowe	Los Angeles Kings		Free agency	
July 27, 1994	Shjon Podein	Edmonton Oilers		Free agency	
August 16, 1994	Shawn Anderson	Washington Capitals		Free agency	
February 10, 1995	Jim Montgomery	Montreal Canadiens		Waivers	
March 5, 1995	Les Kuntar	Hershey Bears (AHL)	1-year (Note: Signed for the remainder of the regular season.)	Free agency	

=== Players lost ===
Date	Player	New team	Via	Ref
June 20, 1994	Corey Foster	Ottawa Senators	Free agency	
June 22, 1994	Lance Pitlick	Ottawa Senators	Free agency	
June 27, 1994	Todd Hlushko	Calgary Flames	Free agency	
July 26, 1994	Rob Ramage		Retirement	
August 1994	Dave Tippett	Houston Aeros (IHL)	Free agency	
August 11, 1994	Frederic Chabot	Florida Panthers	Free agency	
N/A	Eric Dandenault	HC Fassa (Serie A)	Free agency	
N/A	Toni Porkka	Lukko (Liiga)	Free agency	
N/A	Claude Vilgrain	SC Herisau (NLB)	Free agency	

=== Signings ===
Date	Player	Term	Contract type	Ref
August 16, 1994	Brent Fedyk		Re-signing	
August 23, 1994	Dan Kordic		Re-signing	
September 2, 1994	Ryan Sittler	3-year	Signing	
January 30, 1995	Garry Galley	3-year	Re-signing	

== Draft picks ==
=== NHL entry draft ===
Philadelphia's picks at the 1994 NHL entry draft, which was held at the Hartford Civic Center in Hartford, Connecticut, on June 28, 1994. The Flyers traded their first-round picks in 1993 and 1994, 10th overall, along with Steve Duchesne, Ron Hextall, Kerry Huffman, Mike Ricci, Chris Simon, the rights to Peter Forsberg, and $15 million to the Quebec Nordiques for the rights to Eric Lindros on June 30, 1992. Their second-round pick, 36th overall, was given to the Florida Panthers as compensation for the Flyers hiring Bob Clarke as their general manager. They also traded their fifth-round pick, 114th overall, and Greg Johnson to the Detroit Red Wings for Jim Cummins and the Red Wings' 1993 fourth-round pick on June 20, 1993.

Round	Pick	Player	Position	Nationality	Team (league)	Notes
3	62	Artem Anisimov	Defense	Russia	Itil Kazan (Russia)	
4	88	Adam Magarrell	Defense	Canada	Brandon Wheat Kings (WHL)	
4	101	Sebastien Vallee	Left wing	Canada	Victoriaville Tigres (QMJHL)	(Note: The Flyers traded Terry Carkner to the Detroit Red Wings for Yves Racine and the Red Wings' fourth-round pick, 101st overall, on October 5, 1993.)
6	140	Alexander Selivanov	Right wing	Russia	Spartak Moscow (RUS)	
7	166	Colin Forbes	Left wing	Canada	Sherwood Park Crusaders (AJHL)	
8	192	Derek Diener	Defense	Canada	Lethbridge Hurricanes (WHL)	
8	202	Ray Giroux	Defense	Canada	Powassan Hawks (NOJHL)	(Note: The Flyers traded Pelle Eklund to the Dallas Stars for the Stars' eighth-round pick, 202nd overall, on March 21, 1994.)
9	218	Johan Hedberg	Goaltender	Sweden	Leksands IF (Elitserien)	
10	244	Andre Payette	Left wing	Canada	Sault Ste. Marie Greyhounds (OHL)	
11	270	Jan Lipiansky	Forward	Slovakia	Slovan Bratislava (Slovakia)	

=== NHL supplemental draft ===
Philadelphia's picks at the 1994 NHL supplemental draft on June 28, 1994.

Round	Pick	Player	Position	Nationality	Team (league)
1	10	Kirk Nielsen	Right wing	United States	Harvard University (ECAC)

== Farm teams ==
The Flyers were affiliated with the Hershey Bears of the American Hockey League and the Johnstown Chiefs of the ECHL. Mitch Lamoureux led the Bears with 85 points as Hershey finished 2nd in their division and lost in six games to the Cornwall Aces in the first round. Johnstown finished 4th in their division and lost in the first round to the South Carolina Stingrays.
