= Legion of Doom (ice hockey) =

Philadelphia Flyers line from 1995 to 1997

The Legion of Doom was a forward line for the Philadelphia Flyers who played together between 1995 and 1997 comprising centre Eric Lindros, left winger John LeClair and right winger Mikael Renberg. They were given this name not only for their offensive play, but also their ability to dominate games physically; each of the three were six foot two or taller and weighed over 230 pounds. The name was coined by journeyman Flyers centre Jim Montgomery and popularized by Flyers announcer Gene Hart.

== History ==
=== Background ===
In the 1992–93 and 1993–94 seasons, Mark Recchi (jersey #8), Lindros (#88) and Brent Fedyk (#18) had formed the productive "Crazy Eights" line. Renberg split his time playing left wing with Lindros and right wing with Rod Brind'Amour. Despite a strong start to the 1993–94 season, and emergent talents such as Lindros and Renberg, the Flyers fell apart in the second half of the year and narrowly missed the playoffs, the fifth consecutive time that the club didn't reach the postseason. This led to the firing of head coach Terry Simpson and general manager Russ Farwell. They were succeeded by Terry Murray and Bobby Clarke, respectively.

=== Formation ===
The line was formed in the lockout-shortened 1994–95 season when the Montreal Canadiens traded John LeClair, Eric Desjardins, and Gilbert Dionne to the Flyers in exchange for Mark Recchi. Renberg was moved from Rod Brind'Amour's left wing and placed on Lindros' right wing. Murray then placed LeClair as the left wing to form the trio. LeClair was expected to use his physical prowess to make room for Lindros, and went on to exceed all expectations as LeClair's scoring totals jumped dramatically compared with his time with the Canadiens.

The line registered its first point on Saturday, February 11, 1995, in a game against the New Jersey Devils at the Meadowlands Sports Complex. The line made an immediate impact, as it helped the Flyers defeat the Devils 3–1. Before the formation of the line, the Flyers had struggled out of the gate, going only 3–7–1 through their first 11 games while being outscored 34–22. However, in their final 37 games (including the one on February 11 against the Devils), the Flyers went 25–9–3 and outscored their opponents 128–98 en route to capturing the Atlantic Division title and an appearance in the Eastern Conference Finals (a six-game loss to the Devils).

The Legion went on to score 80 goals and collect 96 assists that season for Philadelphia. Eric Lindros, with a total of 70 points, tied the Pittsburgh Penguins' Jaromir Jagr for the scoring lead that season, but the Art Ross Trophy was given to Jagr as he had 32 goals to Lindros' 29. Lindros, however, was named the league MVP, winning the Hart Memorial Trophy and the Lester B. Pearson Award. Both Lindros and LeClair earned NHL First-Team All-Star honours.

=== 1995–96 season ===
The line stayed together for the 1995–96 season, which would turn out to be their most productive, as they scored 121 goals and picked up 134 assists.

=== 1997 Stanley Cup Finals ===
Their last season together was 1996–97, where they scored 104 goals and collected 131 assists. The Legion's offensive production was down due to injuries to Renberg.

They also led the Philadelphia Flyers to the 1997 Stanley Cup Finals, collecting 26 goals and 32 assists in their play-off run, as they beat the Pittsburgh Penguins, Buffalo Sabres, and New York Rangers in five games each.

However, they were upset by the Detroit Red Wings, who swept them four games to none. Detroit head coach Scotty Bowman surprised Flyers head coach Terry Murray by using the finesse-oriented defense pairing of Nicklas Lidström and Larry Murphy, rather than the rugged Vladimir Konstantinov, against the Legion of Doom. Lidstrom and Murphy's puckhandling abilities helped them neutralize Philadelphia's vaunted forechecking. LeClair and Lindros only scored one goal each during the Finals series; LeClair scored the Flyers' only goal as they lost 6–1 in Game 3, while Lindros finally managed to put the puck in the net during the dying seconds of Game 4 to cut the Wings' lead to 2–1.

Many hockey fans remember the unyielding and often violent response to their aggressive forechecking as the key to the series. In particular, Konstantinov and defensive partner Viacheslav Fetisov were brutally effective in their own zone.

=== Breakup ===
Terry Murray's contract as head coach was not renewed due to accusing his team of choking during a closed-door meeting with his players following their 6–1 loss in Game 3 of the 1997 Stanley Cup Finals, which exposed the fragile confidence of the team, though he remained with the Flyers as a pro scout and later as an assistant coach.

The line would be broken up in the 1997 off-season, as Philadelphia dealt Renberg in exchange for Chris Gratton. Lindros and LeClair still played on the same line for the next three seasons, with players such as Keith Jones at right-wing. Later Renberg would return to Philadelphia for exactly the same trade which would send Gratton back to the Tampa Bay Lightning. Although Renberg returned, the original Legion of Doom did not, for Renberg could never make it past the third forward line.

Mark Recchi returned to the Flyers midway through the 1998–99 season and again became the team's leading scorer. Lindros missed the end of the 1999–2000 season with a concussion, so the Flyers traded for Keith Primeau who played a physical forward role similar to Lindros, as Lindros only returned at the end of the playoffs. That turned out to be his last game with the Flyers, as he held out the following season over a contract dispute and he was sent to the New York Rangers for 2001–02. John LeClair was bought out by the Flyers following the 2004–05 NHL lockout and signed with the Pittsburgh Penguins.

On December 31, 2011, Lindros and LeClair played as "two thirds" of the Legion of Doom at the Philadelphia Flyers and New York Rangers alumni game in Philadelphia at Citizen's Bank Park.

On January 14, 2017 all three members of the Legion of Doom played together for the first time since Renberg's trade during the Flyers alumni game against the Penguins alumni.

== Legion of Doom statistics ==
=== Regular season ===
	John LeClair					Eric Lindros					Mikael Renberg					Combined Totals				
Season	GP	G	A	Pts	PIM	GP	G	A	Pts	PIM	GP	G	A	Pts	PIM	GP	G	A	Pts	PIM
1994–95	37	25	24	49	20	46	29	41	70	60	47	26	31	57	20	130	80	96	176	100
1995–96	82	51	46	97	64	73	47	68	115	163	51	23	20	43	45	206	121	134	255	272
1996–97	82	50	47	97	58	52	32	47	79	136	77	22	37	59	65	211	104	131	235	259
Totals	201	126	117	243	142	171	108	156	264	359	175	71	88	159	130	547	305	361	666	631

=== Playoffs ===
	John LeClair					Eric Lindros					Mikael Renberg					Combined Totals				
Season	GP	G	A	Pts	PIM	GP	G	A	Pts	PIM	GP	G	A	Pts	PIM	GP	G	A	Pts	PIM
1994–95	15	5	7	12	4	12	4	11	15	18	15	6	7	13	6	42	15	25	40	28
1995–96	11	6	5	11	6	12	6	6	12	43	11	3	6	9	14	34	15	17	32	63
1996–97	19	9	12	21	10	19	12	14	26	40	18	5	6	11	4	56	26	32	58	54
Totals	45	20	24	44	20	43	22	31	53	101	44	14	19	33	24	132	56	74	130	145

== See also ==
- List of ice hockey line nicknames
