= Next One =

Next One may refer to:

- The Next One (film), 1984
- The Next One (ice hockey), a nickname given to promising young players
- Next One!, a series of game shows based on the Italian program Avanti un altro!
