= Terry Murray =

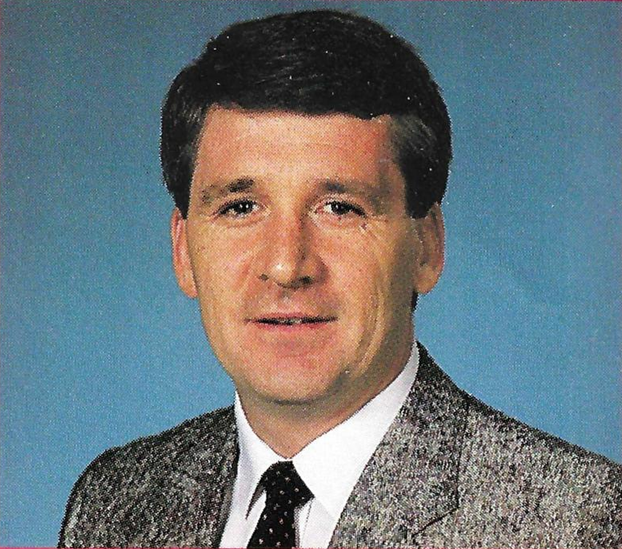
- Born: July 20, 1950 (age 76) Shawville, Quebec, Canada
- Height: 6 ft 2 in (188 cm)
- Weight: 190 lb (86 kg; 13 st 8 lb)
- Position: Defence
- Shot: Right
- Played for: California Golden Seals; Philadelphia Flyers; Detroit Red Wings; Washington Capitals
- Coached for: Washington Capitals; Philadelphia Flyers; Florida Panthers; Los Angeles Kings; Buffalo Sabres (assistant)
- NHL draft: 88th overall, 1970; California Golden Seals
- Playing career: 1970–1982
- Coaching career: 1983–2019

Terry Rodney Murray (born July 20, 1950) is a Canadian former professional ice hockey player and the former head coach of the Washington Capitals, Philadelphia Flyers, Florida Panthers and Los Angeles Kings.

== Playing career ==
Murray was born in Shawville, Quebec. A defenceman in his playing days, Murray was drafted by the California Golden Seals in the 1970 NHL entry draft. He played for the Philadelphia Flyers, Detroit Red Wings, and Washington Capitals.

== Coaching career ==
Following his final season as an active player in 1981–82, he became an assistant coach for his brother Bryan Murray, then the Capitals' head coach, establishing the NHL's first brother coaching combination.

Murray later served as head coach of their AHL affiliate, the Baltimore Skipjacks. He was promoted to the Capitals head coach position in the middle of the 1989–90 NHL season, replacing his brother Bryan. Under T. Murray's guidance, the Capitals advanced further into the NHL playoffs than ever before, winning two rounds before being swept by Boston in the conference finals. Murray coached the Capitals until the middle of the 1993–94 NHL season when he was replaced by Jim Schoenfeld.

After a brief coaching stint as head coach of the Cincinnati Cyclones in the IHL, Murray became head coach of the Philadelphia Flyers, where he put together the "Legion of Doom" line consisting of Eric Lindros, John LeClair, and Mikael Renberg. In three seasons as head coach of the Flyers (1994–95 through 1996–97), Murray compiled a 118–64–30 record and coached the team to two Atlantic Division Championships (1994–95 and 1995–96) and to the 1997 Stanley Cup Final as the Eastern Conference Champion. After beating three teams easily with 4-1 series wins, the Flyers were swept by the Detroit Red Wings in four games. Despite this accomplishment, Murray was fired after the end of the 1997 playoffs. One website had described Terry's shuffling of goaltenders Ron Hextall and Garth Snow to be unprofessional, while others felt it was a possible panic move, and even Snow was caught by surprise at the move after the Game 1 loss to have him in for Hextall.

When the Flyers lost 6-1 in Game 3, he described the result as a choking situation during a closed-door meeting with his players, which angered them since it "exposed and pulverized" the "fragility of the team's confidence". Murray served as a pro scout for the Flyers during the 1997–98 season, which saw Wayne Cashman named as coach, who was meant to be a more communicative coach.

During the 1998–99 season, Murray assumed the Panthers' head coaching position from his brother, Bryan, the interim Panthers' coach, after Doug MacLean was fired. In 1999–2000, Murray led the Panthers to a franchise record 98-point season, team-record 43 victories, and into the first round of the playoffs. He was replaced by Duane Sutter at the Panthers' helm in the fall of 2000.

Murray served as a pro scout for the Philadelphia Flyers over parts of three seasons (2000–01 to 2002–03) and joined the coaching staff as an assistant coach from 2003 to 2008.

He served as coach of the Los Angeles Kings from July 17, 2008, until December 12, 2011. At the time of his dismissal, he ranked third in franchise wins (139), fourth in games coached (275), and first in winning percentage (.560). Assistant coach John Stevens was named interim head coach. He did some scouting for the Kings during their run to the Stanley Cup Final. When the Kings won the 2012 Stanley Cup Final under then-head coach Darryl Sutter, they requested the NHL to have Murray's name included on the cup but were denied by the NHL. He received a Stanley Cup ring.

Murray then served as head coach of the Lehigh Valley Phantoms of the American Hockey League. At the time, Murray was the only coach in the AHL who had coached in the league in the 1980s. He was later named as an assistant coach for the Buffalo Sabres on June 18, 2015. He returned to the Phantoms as an assistant coach in December 2018.

== Personal life ==
Terry and his wife, Linda, reside in Scarborough, Maine. They have two daughters, Meaghan and Lindsey.

Murray, one of ten children of Clarence and Rhoda Murray, was born and raised in the Ottawa Valley town of Shawville, Quebec, near Ottawa.

== Career statistics ==
=== Regular season and playoffs ===
			Regular season					Playoffs
Season	Team	League	GP	G	A	Pts	PIM	GP	G	A	Pts	PIM
1965–66	Pembroke Lumber Kings	CJHL	—	—	—	—	—	—	—	—	—	—
1967–68	Ottawa 67's	OHA	52	0	4	4	59	—	—	—	—	—
1968–69	Ottawa 67's	OHA	50	1	16	17	39	7	0	1	1	4
1969–70	Ottawa 67's	OHA	50	4	24	28	43	5	0	0	0	2
1970–71	Providence Reds	AHL	57	1	22	23	47	10	0	1	1	5
1971–72	Baltimore Clippers	AHL	30	0	5	5	13	—	—	—	—	—
1971–72	Boston Braves	AHL	9	0	0	0	0	—	—	—	—	—
1971–72	Oklahoma City Blazers	CHL	17	1	1	2	19	6	0	0	0	2
1972–73	California Golden Seals	NHL	23	0	3	3	4	—	—	—	—	—
1972–73	Salt Lake Golden Eagles	WHL	39	3	8	11	30	9	0	6	6	14
1973–74	California Golden Seals	NHL	58	0	12	12	48	—	—	—	—	—
1974–75	California Golden Seals	NHL	9	0	2	2	8	—	—	—	—	—
1974–75	Salt Lake Golden Eagles	CHL	62	5	30	35	122	11	2	2	4	30
1975–76	Philadelphia Flyers	NHL	3	0	0	0	2	6	0	1	1	0
1975–76	Richmond Robins	AHL	67	8	48	56	95	6	1	4	5	2
1976–77	Philadelphia Flyers	NHL	36	0	13	13	14	—	—	—	—	—
1976–77	Detroit Red Wings	NHL	23	0	7	7	10	—	—	—	—	—
1977–78	Philadelphia Firebirds	AHL	7	2	1	3	13	—	—	—	—	—
1977–78	Maine Mariners	AHL	68	9	40	49	53	12	1	7	8	28
1978–79	Philadelphia Flyers	NHL	5	0	0	0	0	—	—	—	—	—
1978–79	Maine Mariners	AHL	55	14	23	37	14	10	1	5	6	6
1979–80	Maine Mariners	AHL	68	3	19	22	26	12	2	2	4	10
1980–81	Philadelphia Flyers	NHL	71	1	17	18	53	12	2	1	3	10
1980–81	Maine Mariners	AHL	2	0	1	1	0	—	—	—	—	—
1981–82	Washington Capitals	NHL	74	3	22	25	60	—	—	—	—	—
AHL totals			363	37	159	196	261	50	5	19	24	51
NHL totals			302	4	76	80	199	18	2	2	4	10

== NHL coaching record ==
Team	Year	Regular season							Post season			
Team	Year	G	W	L	T	OTL	Pts	Finish	W	L	Pct.	Result
WSH	1989–90	34	18	14	2	–	(78)	3rd in Patrick	8	7	.533	Lost in Conference finals (BOS)
WSH	1990–91	80	37	36	7	–	81	3rd in Patrick	5	6	.455	Lost in Division finals (PIT)
WSH	1991–92	80	45	27	8	–	98	2nd in Patrick	3	4	.429	Lost in Division semifinals (PIT)
WSH	1992–93	84	43	34	7	–	93	2nd in Patrick	2	4	.333	Lost in Division semifinals (NYI)
WSH	1993–94	47	20	23	4	–	(88)	Fired	–	–	–	–
WSH Total		325	163	134	28	–			18	21	.462	4 playoff appearances
PHI	1994–95	48	28	16	4	–	60	1st in Atlantic	10	5	.667	Lost in Conference finals (NJD)
PHI	1995–96	82	45	24	13	–	103	1st in Atlantic	6	6	.500	Lost in Conference semifinals (FLA)
PHI	1996–97	82	45	24	13	–	103	2nd in Atlantic	12	7	.632	Lost in Stanley Cup Final (DET)
PHI Total		212	118	64	20	–			28	18	.609	3 playoff appearances
FLA	1998–99	82	30	34	18	–	78	2nd in Southeast	–	–	–	Missed playoffs
FLA	1999–00	82	43	27	6	6	98	2nd in Southeast	0	4	.000	Lost in Conference quarterfinals (NJD)
FLA	2000–01	36	6	18	7	5	(66)	Fired	–	–	–	–
FLA Total		200	79	79	31	11			0	4	.000	1 playoff appearance
LAK	2008–09	82	34	37	–	11	79	5th in Pacific	–	–	–	Missed playoffs
LAK	2009–10	82	46	27	–	9	101	3rd in Pacific	2	4	.333	Lost in Conference quarterfinals (VAN)
LAK	2010–11	82	46	30	–	6	98	4th in Pacific	2	4	.333	Lost in Conference quarterfinals (SJS)
LAK	2011–12	29	13	12	–	4	(95)	Fired	–	–	–	–
LAK Total		275	139	106	–	30			4	8	.333	2 playoff appearances
Total		1012	499	383	89	41			50	51	.495	10 playoff appearances

Preceded by Bryan Murray	Head coach of the Washington Capitals; 1990–1994	Succeeded by Jim Schoenfeld
Preceded by Terry Simpson	Head coach of the Philadelphia Flyers; 1994–1997	Succeeded by Wayne Cashman
Preceded by Bryan Murray	Head coach of the Florida Panthers; 1998–2000	Succeeded by Duane Sutter
Preceded by Marc Crawford	Head coach of the Los Angeles Kings; 2008–2011	Succeeded by John Stevens (interim)
