= Piteå Wall of Fame =

Coordinates: 65°19′27″N 21°28′39″E

The Piteå Wall of Fame is a wall of fame at Kvarnvallen Icestadium in the Swedish town of Piteå. Here, the players who started their career in an ice hockey club in Piteå and played in the Tre kronor are honored with a plate on the wall with a photo and career facts. Many of them are world champions, Olympic champions and Stanley Cup winners.

== Players ==
Meriter					
Name	Olympic games	World Champions	Stanley cup winners	Swedish ice hockey champions	Club
Mikael Renberg		1998 Gold, 1993 Silver 2001 bronze			Retired
Tomas Holmström	2006 gold		1997, 1998, 2002, 2008 Detroit Red Wings	1996 Luleå HF	Retired
Mattias Öhlund	2006 Gold	1998 Gold 1997 silver 2001 bronze		1996 Luleå HF	Retired
Stefan Persson			1980,1981,1982,1983 New York Islanders (first Swede to win)	1976,1977 Brynäs IF	Retired
Tomas Berglund		1977 WC silver		1996 Luleå HF	Retired
Lars Lindgren		1977 WC Silver			Retired
Hasse Svedberg		1957 Gold 1958 bronze			Retired
Lars Hurtig				1996 Luleå HF	Retired
Jan Sandström					Luleå HF
Lars Öhman					Retired
Lars Edström					Retired
Jan Asplund				1976, 1977 and 1980 Brynäs IF	Retired
Leif R Carlsson				1986, 1988 Färjestad BK	Retired

== See also ==
- Swedish Hockey Hall of Fame
