= Brent Fedyk =

Canadian ice hockey player (born 1967)

- Born: March 8, 1967 (age 59) Yorkton, Saskatchewan, Canada
- Height: 6 ft 1 in (185 cm)
- Weight: 186 lb (84 kg; 13 st 4 lb)
- Position: Right wing
- Shot: Right
- Played for: Detroit Red Wings; Philadelphia Flyers; Dallas Stars; New York Rangers
- NHL draft: 8th overall, 1985; Detroit Red Wings
- Playing career: 1987–2000

Brent Anthony Fedyk (born March 8, 1967) is a Canadian former professional ice hockey right winger. He was drafted in the first round, 8th overall, by the Detroit Red Wings in the 1985 NHL entry draft.

Born in Yorkton, Saskatchewan, Fedyk played five seasons of junior hockey in the Western Hockey League. He made his professional debut with the Red Wings' American Hockey League affiliate, the Adirondack Red Wings, in the 1987–88 season. He also appeared in two NHL games with Detroit that same season.

After splitting three seasons between Detroit and Adirondack, and then spending two seasons in the NHL full-time, Fedyk joined the Philadelphia Flyers for the 1992–93 season. He recorded the first two 20-goal seasons of his career in his first two seasons in Philadelphia as a member of the Crazy Eights line with Eric Lindros and Mark Recchi.

Fedyk split the 1995–96 season between the Flyers and the Dallas Stars, recording his third 20-goal season. He then was out of the NHL for two seasons, playing in the International Hockey League. He had one final stint in the NHL during the 1998–99 season, playing with the New York Rangers.

Fedyk appeared in 470 NHL games in his career, scoring 97 goals and adding 112 assists. He also appeared in 16 Stanley Cup playoff games, scoring three goals and recording two assists.

== Career statistics ==
			Regular season					Playoffs
Season	Team	League	GP	G	A	Pts	PIM	GP	G	A	Pts	PIM
1982–83	Regina Pats	WHL	1	0	0	0	0	—	—	—	—	—
1983–84	Regina Pats	WHL	63	15	28	43	30	23	8	7	15	6
1984–85	Regina Pats	WHL	66	35	35	70	48	8	5	4	9	0
1985–86	Regina Pats	WHL	50	43	34	77	47	5	0	1	1	0
1986–87	Regina Pats	WHL	12	9	6	15	9	—	—	—	—	—
1986–87	Seattle Thunderbirds	WHL	13	5	11	16	9	—	—	—	—	—
1986–87	Portland Winterhawks	WHL	11	5	4	9	6	14	5	6	11	0
1987–88	Adirondack Red Wings	AHL	34	9	11	20	22	5	0	2	2	6
1987–88	Detroit Red Wings	NHL	2	0	1	1	2	—	—	—	—	—
1988–89	Adirondack Red Wings	AHL	66	40	28	68	33	15	7	8	15	23
1988–89	Detroit Red Wings	NHL	5	2	0	2	0	—	—	—	—	—
1989–90	Adirondack Red Wings	AHL	33	14	15	29	24	6	2	1	3	4
1989–90	Detroit Red Wings	NHL	27	1	4	5	6	—	—	—	—	—
1990–91	Detroit Red Wings	NHL	67	16	19	35	38	6	1	0	1	2
1991–92	Adirondack Red Wings	AHL	1	0	2	2	0	—	—	—	—	—
1991–92	Detroit Red Wings	NHL	61	5	8	13	42	1	0	0	0	2
1992–93	Philadelphia Flyers	NHL	74	21	38	59	48	—	—	—	—	—
1993–94	Philadelphia Flyers	NHL	72	20	18	38	74	—	—	—	—	—
1994–95	Philadelphia Flyers	NHL	30	8	4	12	14	9	2	2	4	8
1995–96	Philadelphia Flyers	NHL	24	10	5	15	24	—	—	—	—	—
1995–96	Dallas Stars	NHL	41	10	9	19	30	—	—	—	—	—
1996–97	Michigan K-Wings	IHL	9	1	2	3	4	—	—	—	—	—
1997–98	Detroit Vipers	IHL	40	18	23	41	24	—	—	—	—	—
1997–98	Cincinnati Cyclones	IHL	26	21	13	34	14	9	5	5	10	2
1998–99	New York Rangers	NHL	67	4	6	10	30	—	—	—	—	—
1999–2000	Kassel Huskies	DEL	24	5	6	11	8	—	—	—	—	—
NHL totals			470	97	112	209	308	16	3	2	5	12

Preceded by Shawn Burr	Detroit Red Wings first-round draft pick 1985	Succeeded by Joe Murphy
