= The Next One (ice hockey) =

Sport competitors with nickname The Next One

The Next One is a nickname found in ice hockey attached to a new Canadian, up-and-coming player, who is deemed to have the capacity for being a top, sport-dominating player, akin to other Canadians Gordie Howe, Bobby Orr, Wayne Gretzky, Maurice Richard and Mario Lemieux.

== List of "Next Ones" ==
The moniker has been applied to the following ice hockey players (in order of bestowment):

- Eric Lindros
- Paul Kariya
- Sidney Crosby
- Alexandre Daigle
- John Tavares
- Connor McDavid
- Connor Bedard

== History ==
The name is a play on Wayne Gretzky's nickname, "The Great One". Each of the players listed has been or is currently billed as the next Wayne Gretzky. To date, only Connor McDavid and Sidney Crosby have broken a National Hockey League record set by Gretzky, and only Crosby has won the Stanley Cup. Mario Lemieux, "The Magnificent One", was the closest to breaking several of Gretzky's records, but he was never called "The Next One" by the media, because he was Gretzky's contemporary for most of his NHL career. The name continues to be used to highlight the achievements of young players still in their teenage years, who outcompete players older than them in minor league or international junior play as Gretzky did.
