= John LeClair =

American ice hockey player (born 1969)

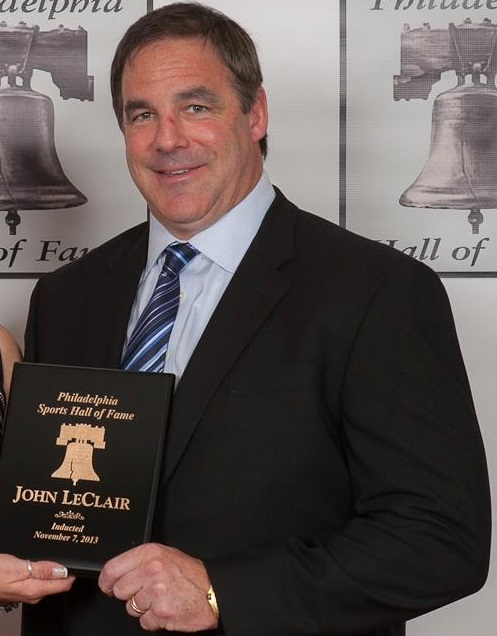
- LeClair in November 2013
- Born: July 5, 1969 (age 57) St. Albans, Vermont, U.S.
- Height: 6 ft 3 in (191 cm)
- Weight: 225 lb (102 kg; 16 st 1 lb)
- Position: Left wing
- Shot: Left
- Played for: Montreal Canadiens; Philadelphia Flyers; Pittsburgh Penguins
- National team: United States
- NHL draft: 33rd overall, 1987; Montreal Canadiens
- Playing career: 1991–2006
Medal record
World Cup of Hockey
Gold medal – first place	1996 United States
Representing the United States
Olympic Games
Silver medal – second place	2002 Salt Lake City	Team competition

John Clark LeClair (born July 5, 1969) is an American former professional ice hockey player. He played 16 seasons in the National Hockey League (NHL) with the Montreal Canadiens, Philadelphia Flyers, and Pittsburgh Penguins from 1991 to 2006. LeClair was a member of the Montreal Canadiens' Stanley Cup winning team in 1993, scoring two overtime game-winning goals in consecutive games during the Final. With the Flyers, LeClair became the first American-born player to score 50 goals in three consecutive NHL seasons while playing on the Legion of Doom line with Eric Lindros and Mikael Renberg.

== Early life ==
LeClair was born on July 5, 1969, in St. Albans, Vermont, a town close to the Canada–US border. He is the son of Robert "Butch" LeClair, a manager of a paint store, and Beverly (Clark), a surgical nurse. LeClair has three older sisters, Mary Kay, Nancy, and Susan, and a younger brother, Joseph.

Although familiar with hockey, LeClair's father Butch never actually played the sport himself. Until the 1960s, there was no organized hockey in the Saint Albans area. Despite this, LeClair took notice and asked his father for a pair of hockey skates at age six. Butch recalls how the kids in the area first played:

At first, they played in an old railroad shed. Then they got a bunch of people who signed a note and built Coote Field Arena. It was just a metal shack with a lunch bar and an old tractor to scrape the ice. It was kind of primitive, but it worked very well. It produced some good hockey.

Richard Benoit, the father of John's friend Jeremy, created a homemade rink for the kids in his backyard by flooding his volleyball court. Benoit added boards around the edge and installed lights so they could play at night. There was also a shack complete with a heater for the kids to go to warm up if needed.

== High school and college years ==
When LeClair was a freshman at Bellows Free Academy, he didn't make the very competitive high school team. So, he continued to play in community leagues. In his sophomore year, LeClair made the team and earned attention. "We'd be dumping the puck in (during a line change), and there would be John, in the corner on his knees and hands, five against one, somehow getting the puck out of the corner," recalls Luke Cioffi, a teammate and childhood friend of LeClair's.

Soon, the young LeClair was attracting attention. College scouts began to take notice when he participated as a junior in Hockey Night in Boston, a showcase for young talent. LeClair decided to pursue college, and he was accepted at the University of Vermont (UVM). At UVM, LeClair's college career was hampered by injuries. Over the course of his sophomore and junior years, he appeared in only 28 games. After missing the first month of his senior season due to meningitis, he finished the season strong with 25 goals and 20 assists in only 33 games.

== Playing career ==
=== Montreal Canadiens ===
LeClair was drafted by the Montreal Canadiens with the 33rd pick in the 1987 NHL entry draft after graduating from Bellows Free Academy (B.F.A.) High School in St. Albans, Vermont. One of the most highly recruited hockey players in New England, LeClair put his NHL aspirations on hold to attend the University of Vermont on a full scholarship. His fans didn't have to wait long to see him score in his first collegiate game. After the final game of his senior year he signed with the Canadiens and, less than a week later, played and scored in his first NHL game. As a member of the Canadiens, LeClair was on the Stanley Cup-winning team in 1993, where he scored two overtime game-winning goals during the 1993 Stanley Cup Final. LeClair became the first Vermont-born player to have his name engraved on the Stanley Cup as a result.

=== Philadelphia Flyers and the Legion of Doom ===
On February 9, 1995, a Montreal team desperate to salvage a difficult season traded LeClair, along with Éric Desjardins and Gilbert Dionne to the Philadelphia Flyers in exchange for Mark Recchi and Philadelphia's third round choice in the 1995 NHL entry draft (Martin Hohenberger). LeClair gelled immediately with new line-mate Eric Lindros and quickly became one of the NHL's most feared goal scorers.

With the Flyers, he played left-wing on the famed "Legion of Doom" line, centered by Lindros and Mikael Renberg on right-wing. The trio was not only effective at scoring but they were also a dominant physical presence on the ice. In 1998, LeClair became the first American-born NHL player to record three consecutive 50-goal seasons and the second Flyer to do so, behind Tim Kerr. Following the 1997–98 NHL season, LeClair had two consecutive 40-goal seasons. A healthy 2001-02 season was sandwiched by a disc problem in his back and shoulder injuries.

During his first five seasons with the Flyers, LeClair was named to the season-ending NHL All-Star team, twice to the first team and three times to the second team. That is currently the highest total among retired players eligible for the Hockey Hall of Fame who have not been inducted.

LeClair played for the Flyers for 10 seasons and was one of the most productive players in franchise history, scoring 333 goals and an additional 35 in the playoffs, statistics good enough to place him in the top 10 Flyers' career goal scorers.

=== Pittsburgh Penguins ===
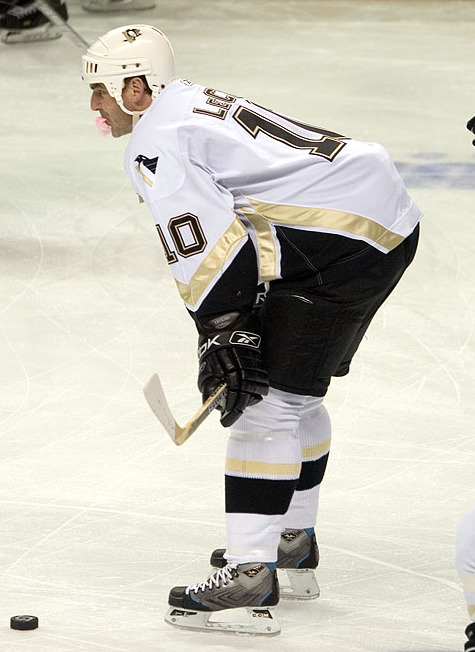
LeClair with the Pittsburgh Penguins in 2006

On July 23, 2005, as a result of a new Collective Bargaining Agreement which finally introduced a salary cap to the NHL, the Flyers were forced to part ways with their longtime alternate captain, and they bought out LeClair's contract to create cap space. Rumors had LeClair going to the Boston Bruins or perhaps the Toronto Maple Leafs. Instead, LeClair signed a two-year deal with the Pittsburgh Penguins on August 15, 2005. LeClair had a successful season in Pittsburgh during the 2005–06 season, finishing fourth on the team in scoring as he passed the 400-goal mark and had his ninth 50+ point season.

LeClair struggled in the first quarter of the 2006–07 season, scoring only two goals and five assists through 21 games. On December 14, 2006, he and the Penguins agreed to a mutual release from his contract. LeClair retired following the season.

== Other information ==
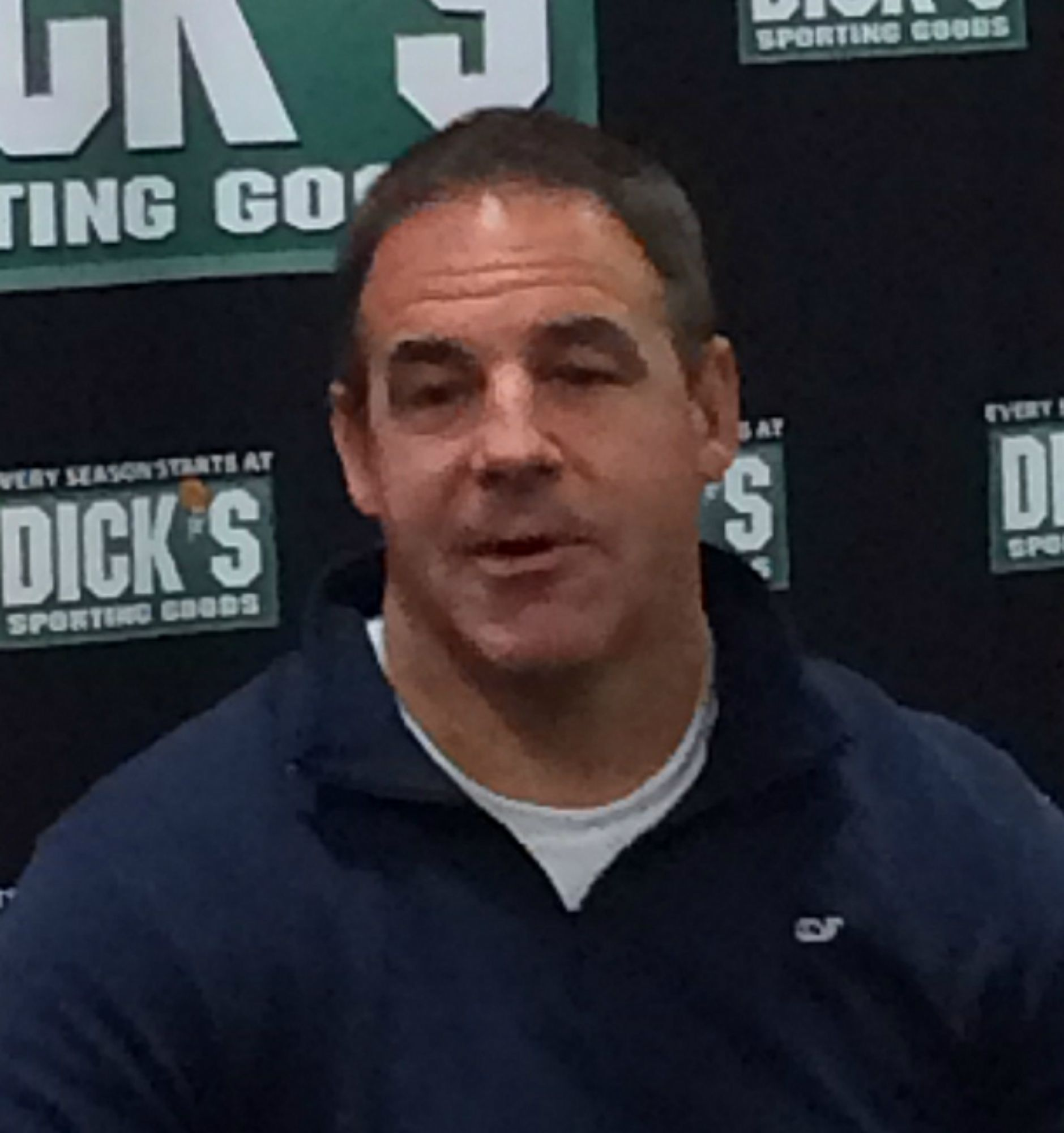
LeClair signing autographs at Dick's Sporting Goods in 2014.

LeClair is president of the John LeClair Foundation which awards grants to non-profit Vermont organizations that sponsor programs for children. He currently divides his time between Haverford Township, Pennsylvania and his hometown of St. Albans, Vermont. LeClair was inducted into the United States Hockey Hall of Fame in 2009, the Vermont Sports Hall of Fame in 2012, and the Philadelphia Flyers Hall of Fame in 2014.

In June 2023, LeClair was hired by the Flyers as a special advisor to hockey operations.

== Awards and honors ==
=== College ===
Award	Year
All-ECAC Hockey All-Rookie Team	1987–88
All-ECAC Hockey Second team	1990–91

=== Professional ===
Award	Year
Stanley Cup champion	1993
Pelle Lindbergh Memorial Trophy	1995
NHL first All-Star team	1995, 1998
NHL second All-Star team	1996, 1997, 1999
Bobby Clarke Trophy	1997, 1998
NHL Plus/Minus Award	1997, 1999
NHL All-Star	1996, 1997, 1998, 1999, 2000

=== International ===
Award	Year
World Cup All-Star team	1996
Olympic Tournament All-Star team	2002

== Career statistics ==
=== Regular season and playoffs ===
			Regular season					Playoffs
Season	Team	League	GP	G	A	Pts	PIM	GP	G	A	Pts	PIM
1985–86	Bellows Free Academy	HS-VT	22	41	28	69	14	—	—	—	—	—
1986–87	Bellows Free Academy	HS-VT	23	44	40	84	14	—	—	—	—	—
1987–88	University of Vermont	ECAC	31	12	22	34	62	—	—	—	—	—
1988–89	University of Vermont	ECAC	18	9	12	21	40	—	—	—	—	—
1989–90	University of Vermont	ECAC	10	10	6	16	38	—	—	—	—	—
1990–91	University of Vermont	ECAC	33	25	20	45	58	—	—	—	—	—
1990–91	Montreal Canadiens	NHL	10	2	5	7	2	3	0	0	0	0
1991–92	Montreal Canadiens	NHL	59	8	11	19	14	8	1	1	2	4
1991–92	Fredericton Canadiens	AHL	8	7	7	14	10	2	0	0	0	4
1992–93	Montreal Canadiens	NHL	72	19	25	44	33	20	4	6	10	14
1993–94	Montreal Canadiens	NHL	74	19	24	43	32	7	2	1	3	8
1994–95	Montreal Canadiens	NHL	9	1	4	5	10	—	—	—	—	—
1994–95	Philadelphia Flyers	NHL	37	25	24	49	20	15	5	7	12	4
1995–96	Philadelphia Flyers	NHL	82	51	46	97	64	11	6	5	11	6
1996–97	Philadelphia Flyers	NHL	82	50	47	97	58	19	9	12	21	10
1997–98	Philadelphia Flyers	NHL	82	51	36	87	32	5	1	1	2	8
1998–99	Philadelphia Flyers	NHL	76	43	47	90	30	6	3	0	3	12
1999–00	Philadelphia Flyers	NHL	82	40	37	77	36	18	6	7	13	6
2000–01	Philadelphia Flyers	NHL	16	7	5	12	0	6	1	2	3	2
2001–02	Philadelphia Flyers	NHL	82	25	26	51	30	5	0	0	0	2
2002–03	Philadelphia Flyers	NHL	35	18	10	28	16	13	2	3	5	10
2003–04	Philadelphia Flyers	NHL	75	23	32	55	51	18	2	2	4	8
2005–06	Pittsburgh Penguins	NHL	73	22	29	51	61	—	—	—	—	—
2006–07	Pittsburgh Penguins	NHL	21	2	5	7	12	—	—	—	—	—
NHL totals			967	406	413	819	501	154	42	47	89	94

=== International ===
Year	Team	Event	GP	G	A	Pts	PIM
1988	United States	WJC	7	4	2	6	12
1989	United States	WJC	7	6	4	10	12
1996	United States	WCH	7	6	4	10	6
1998	United States	OLY	4	0	1	1	0
2002	United States	OLY	6	6	1	7	2
Junior totals			14	10	6	16	24
Senior totals			17	12	6	18	8

=== All-Star Games ===
Year	Location	G	A	P
1996	Boston	0	1	1
1997	San Jose	2	1	3
1998	Vancouver	1	0	1
1999	Tampa Bay	0	0	0
2000	Toronto	0	0	0
All-Star totals		3	2	5

Awards and achievements
Preceded by Vladimir Konstantinov; Chris Pronger	Winner of the NHL Plus/Minus Award; 1997; 1999	Succeeded by Chris Pronger; Chris Pronger
Preceded by Eric Lindros	Winner of the Bobby Clarke Trophy; 1997, 1998	Succeeded by Eric Lindros
