= Mark Recchi =

Canadian ice hockey player and coach (born 1968)

- Hockey Hall of Fame, 2017
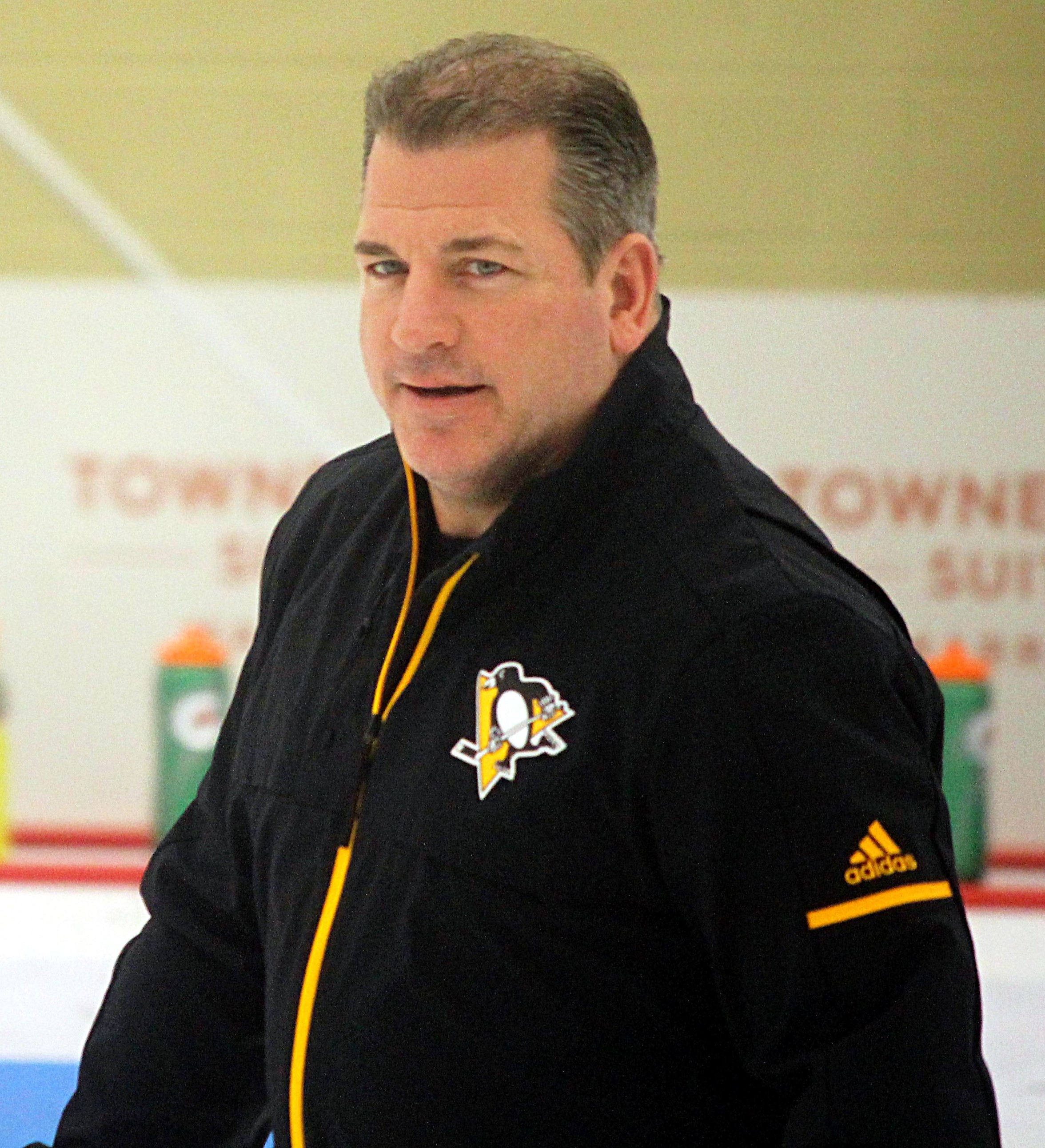
- Recchi in March 2018
- Born: February 1, 1968 (age 58) Kamloops, British Columbia, Canada
- Height: 5 ft 10 in (178 cm)
- Weight: 195 lb (88 kg; 13 st 13 lb)
- Position: Right wing
- Shot: Left
- Played for: Pittsburgh Penguins; Philadelphia Flyers; Montreal Canadiens; Carolina Hurricanes; Atlanta Thrashers; Tampa Bay Lightning; Boston Bruins
- National team: Canada
- NHL draft: 67th overall, 1988; Pittsburgh Penguins
- Playing career: 1988–2011
Medal record
Representing Canada
World Championship
Gold medal – first place	1997 Finland
World Junior Championships
Gold medal – first place	1988 Soviet Union

Mark Louis Recchi (/rɛkɪ/; born February 1, 1968) is a Canadian former professional ice hockey winger who played 22 seasons in the National Hockey League (NHL). He was selected by the Pittsburgh Penguins in the 1988 NHL entry draft, and he played for them, the Philadelphia Flyers, Montreal Canadiens, Carolina Hurricanes, Atlanta Thrashers, Tampa Bay Lightning and Boston Bruins. Recchi won the Stanley Cup three times in his playing career: in 1991 with the Penguins, in 2006 with the Hurricanes, and in 2011 with the Bruins. During the 2010-11 season, Recchi was the last active player who had played in the NHL in the 1980s. Subsequently, in game two of the 2011 Final, Recchi became the oldest player ever to score in a Stanley Cup Final game at age 43. On June 26, 2017, in his fourth year of eligibility, Recchi was inducted into the Hockey Hall of Fame.

== Playing career ==
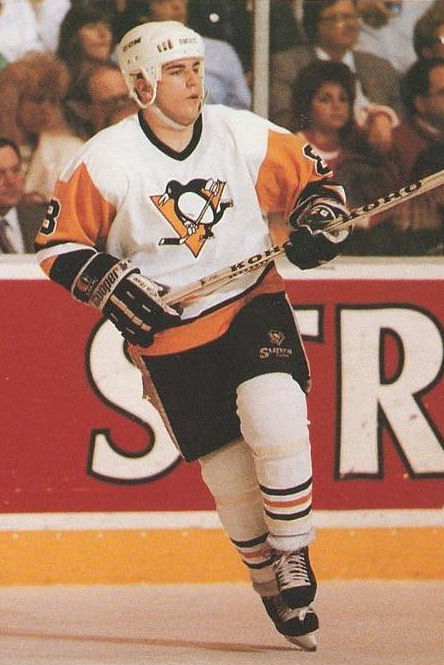
Recchi with the Penguins in 1989

Recchi played his junior hockey for the Kamloops Blazers of the Western Hockey League (WHL). His number 8 was retired by the team shortly after he left for the NHL. He was drafted by the Pittsburgh Penguins, first playing in the NHL in 1988, and was a key player on their Stanley Cup-winning team in 1991.

The following season, Recchi was traded to the Philadelphia Flyers as part of a deal that brought Rick Tocchet and Kjell Samuelsson to Pittsburgh. He played for Philadelphia from 1992 to 1995 as part of the "Crazy Eights" line with Eric Lindros and Brent Fedyk, including a 53-goal, 70-assist and 123-point season in 1992–93, still the Flyers' single-season point-scoring record. In 1995, he was traded to the Montreal Canadiens in a deal for Éric Desjardins, Gilbert Dionne and John LeClair, but was reacquired by the Flyers late in the 1998–99 season and was consistently among their top scorers.

During the 1999–2000 season, Recchi was a finalist for the Lester B. Pearson Award as the National Hockey League Players' Association (NHLPA) MVP, and he finished third in scoring, only five points behind winner Jaromír Jágr and runner-up Pavel Bure. Recchi also finished third in voting for the NHL All-Star team right wing position behind Jágr and Bure. In 2000 and 2004, the Flyers would make the Eastern Conference Final, but they would bow out of each series in seven games.

In 2000, Recchi was named "Kamloops Male Athlete of the 20th Century", and had a street named "Mark Recchi Way" in his honour.

In August 2004, Recchi rejoined the Pittsburgh Penguins as a free agent, signing a two-year contract with a two-way option for a third year. The first year was eventually nullified by the NHL lock-out; in the second year, with the Penguins languishing at the bottom of the NHL standings, Recchi waived his no-trade clause to be sent to the Stanley Cup-contending Carolina Hurricanes at the deadline for minor-league forward Krys Kolanos, left wing Niklas Nordgren and a 2007 second-round pick. Recchi won his second Stanley Cup with the Hurricanes that season, then re-signed with the Penguins during the summer of 2006 off-season.

On January 20, 2007, he scored his seventh career hat-trick (against the Toronto Maple Leafs), and just under a week later, Recchi scored his 500th career goal on January 26, 2007, on the power play against the Dallas Stars.

During the summer of 2007, Recchi re-signed with the Pittsburgh Penguins on a one-year, $2 million contract, but on December 4, he was placed on waivers and assigned to their American Hockey League (AHL) affiliate, the Wilkes-Barre/Scranton Penguins, on December 6. The Penguins then placed Recchi on re-entry waivers the next day, where Recchi was claimed by the Atlanta Thrashers. In his first game against his former team, he scored the game-winning goal in a shootout.

On July 7, 2008, Recchi signed a one-year deal as a free agent with the Tampa Bay Lightning. After scoring 45 points in 62 games with the Lightning in the 2008–09 season, and with the Lightning out of playoff contention, on March 4, 2009, Recchi was traded at the trade deadline (along with a second-round pick in 2010) to the Boston Bruins in exchange for Mārtiņš Karsums and Matt Lashoff. Recchi scored his first two goals for the Bruins three days later on March 7, as the first and third Bruins goals in a 5–3 home ice defeat of the visiting Chicago Blackhawks.

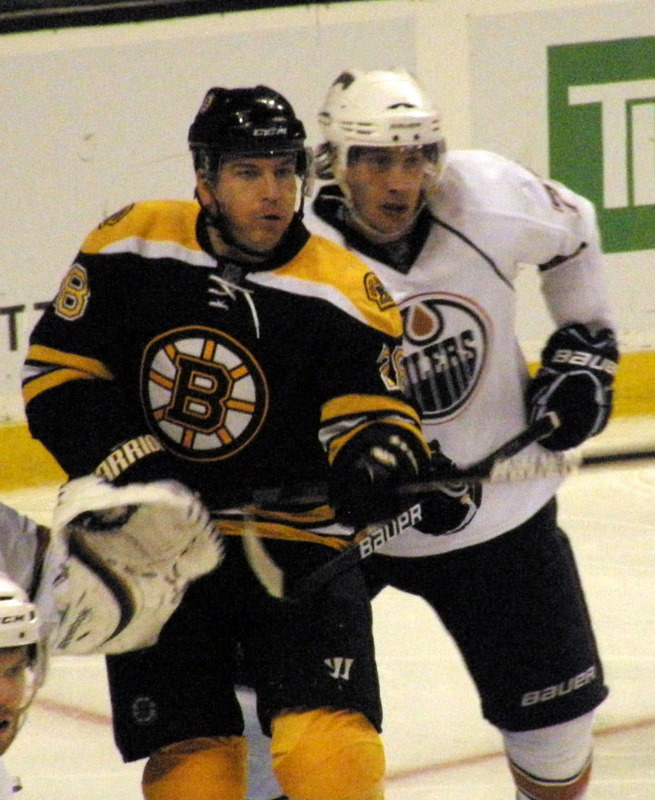
Recchi with the Bruins in October 2009

On July 2, 2009, Recchi re-signed with the Bruins on a one-year contract. At the time, Recchi had stated that the 2009–10 season would be his final year. With the retirement of Joe Sakic in the summer of 2009, Recchi became the leader in points and assists among active players. Recchi would serve as an alternate captain during the season while Marc Savard was injured and out of the line-up, playing 81 of 82 games in the 2009–10 season.

During the 2010 playoffs, Recchi became the third-oldest player to score a playoff goal, behind Chris Chelios and Gordie Howe, and also became the oldest player to have a multi-goal game in the playoffs when he scored two goals in a 5–4 overtime loss to the Philadelphia Flyers in game four of the second round. After suffering defeat in the Eastern Conference Semifinal against the Flyers, instead of retiring, Recchi re-signed with the Bruins for one more year.

In the 2010–11 season on November 24, 2010, Recchi scored twice against the Florida Panthers to earn his 1,500th career point.

In game two of the 2011 Stanley Cup Final, Recchi became the oldest ever player to score a goal in a Stanley Cup Final, doing so at age 43. In game three of the Final, he scored the final two goals of his career. On June 15, 2011, Recchi became a three-time winner of the Stanley Cup and joined Jack Marshall, Frank Foyston, Jack Walker, Mike Keane, Claude Lemieux, Hap Holmes, Al Arbour, Gord Pettinger, Larry Hillman, and Joe Nieuwendyk in winning at least three Stanley Cups with three different teams, as the Bruins defeated the Vancouver Canucks in game seven of the Stanley Cup Final. Recchi also led the team in scoring during the Finals series.

Having previously announced he would "sail off into the sunset" if Boston were victorious in the 2011 Stanley Cup Final, he announced his retirement in an interview with Ron MacLean of Hockey Night in Canada during the post-game Stanley Cup celebration. Recchi was the last player active in professional hockey who had played in the NHL in the 1980s, finishing his career fourth all-time in games played and 12th all-time in points.

== Post-retirement ==
Recchi is a co-owner of the Kamloops Blazers, along with Dallas Stars owner Tom Gaglardi and Jarome Iginla, Shane Doan and Darryl Sydor.

In 2013, Recchi joined the Dallas Stars as a consultant along with former Stars Mike Modano and Marty Turco.

On July 18, 2014, Recchi was hired as the Pittsburgh Penguins' player development coach. He was a part of the 2016 and 2017 Stanley Cup champion teams. He was subsequently promoted to director of player development on June 15, 2017. He was named the assistant coach on July 11, 2017, following the departure of Rick Tocchet, who was named the head coach of the Arizona Coyotes.

Recchi did not have his contract renewed by the Penguins following the 2019-20 season.

Recchi was hired by the New Jersey Devils as an assistant coach on September 8, 2020. He was subsequently fired by the Devils on May 4, 2022. The Columbus Blue Jackets hired Recchi as an assistant coach on September 25, 2023.

== Personal life ==
Mark Recchi was born on February 1, 1968, to Mel and Ruth Recchi in Kamloops, British Columbia. Mark has three brothers: Marty, Mike and Matt.

Recchi married Kim Lazur on August 20, 2016, and they have two children together. Recchi has six children in total, four from a previous marriage. The children's names are: Christina, Bella, Samantha, Brendan, Cameron and Austin.

== Awards and achievements ==
- Inducted into the Hockey Hall of Fame in 2017

Award	Year(s)
WHL West first All-Star team	1988
Stanley Cup champion	1991, 2006, 2011 (as a player), 2016, 2017 (as a development coach)
NHL All-Star Game	1991, 1993, 1994, 1997 (named MVP), 1998, 1999, 2000
NHL second All-Star team	1992
Eddie Shore Award	2010
Named One of Top 100 Best Bruins Players of all Time	2024

== Records ==
- His 123 points (53 goals, 70 assists) in the 1992–1993 season is the Flyers regular season scoring record.
- Oldest player to record 5 assists in a game on March 1, 2009, at 41 years, 28 days.
- Oldest player to score a Stanley Cup Final goal on June 6, 2011, at 43 years, 126 days.

== Career statistics ==
=== Regular season and playoffs ===
			Regular season					Playoffs
Season	Team	League	GP	G	A	Pts	PIM	GP	G	A	Pts	PIM
1984–85	Langley Eagles	BCHL	51	26	39	65	39	—	—	—	—	—
1984–85	New Westminster Bruins	WHL	4	0	1	1	0	—	—	—	—	—
1985–86	New Westminster Bruins	WHL	72	21	40	61	55	—	—	—	—	—
1986–87	Kamloops Blazers	WHL	40	26	50	76	63	13	3	16	19	17
1987–88	Kamloops Blazers	WHL	62	61	93	154	75	17	10	21	31	18
1988–89	Pittsburgh Penguins	NHL	15	1	1	2	0	—	—	—	—	—
1988–89	Muskegon Lumberjacks	IHL	63	50	49	99	86	14	7	14	21	28
1989–90	Pittsburgh Penguins	NHL	74	30	37	67	44	—	—	—	—	—
1989–90	Muskegon Lumberjacks	IHL	4	7	4	11	2	—	—	—	—	—
1990–91	Pittsburgh Penguins	NHL	78	40	73	113	48	24	10	24	34	33
1991–92	Pittsburgh Penguins	NHL	58	33	37	70	78	—	—	—	—	—
1991–92	Philadelphia Flyers	NHL	22	10	17	27	18	—	—	—	—	—
1992–93	Philadelphia Flyers	NHL	84	53	70	123	95	—	—	—	—	—
1993–94	Philadelphia Flyers	NHL	84	40	67	107	46	—	—	—	—	—
1994–95	Philadelphia Flyers	NHL	10	2	3	5	12	—	—	—	—	—
1994–95	Montreal Canadiens	NHL	39	14	29	43	16	—	—	—	—	—
1995–96	Montreal Canadiens	NHL	82	28	50	78	69	6	3	3	6	0
1996–97	Montreal Canadiens	NHL	82	34	46	80	58	5	4	2	6	2
1997–98	Montreal Canadiens	NHL	82	32	42	74	51	10	4	8	12	6
1998–99	Montreal Canadiens	NHL	61	12	35	47	28	—	—	—	—	—
1998–99	Philadelphia Flyers	NHL	10	4	2	6	6	6	0	1	1	2
1999–00	Philadelphia Flyers	NHL	82	28	63	91	50	18	6	12	18	6
2000–01	Philadelphia Flyers	NHL	69	27	50	77	33	6	2	2	4	2
2001–02	Philadelphia Flyers	NHL	80	22	42	64	46	4	0	0	0	2
2002–03	Philadelphia Flyers	NHL	79	20	32	52	35	13	7	3	10	2
2003–04	Philadelphia Flyers	NHL	82	26	49	75	47	18	4	2	6	4
2005–06	Pittsburgh Penguins	NHL	63	24	33	57	56	—	—	—	—	—
2005–06	Carolina Hurricanes	NHL	20	4	3	7	12	25	7	9	16	18
2006–07	Pittsburgh Penguins	NHL	82	24	44	68	62	5	0	4	4	0
2007–08	Pittsburgh Penguins	NHL	19	2	6	8	12	—	—	—	—	—
2007–08	Atlanta Thrashers	NHL	53	12	28	40	20	—	—	—	—	—
2008–09	Tampa Bay Lightning	NHL	62	13	32	45	20	—	—	—	—	—
2008–09	Boston Bruins	NHL	18	10	6	16	2	11	3	3	6	0
2009–10	Boston Bruins	NHL	81	18	25	43	34	13	6	4	10	6
2010–11	Boston Bruins	NHL	81	14	34	48	35	25	5	9	14	8
NHL totals			1,652	577	956	1,533	1,033	189	61	87	148	93

=== International ===
Year	Team	Event	Results	GP	G	A	Pts	PIM
1988	Canada	WJC	1st place, gold medalist(s)	7	0	5	5	4
1990	Canada	WC	4th	5	0	2	2	2
1993	Canada	WC	4th	8	2	5	7	2
1997	Canada	WC	1st place, gold medalist(s)	9	3	3	6	0
1998	Canada	OLY	4th	5	0	2	2	0
Junior totals				7	0	5	5	4
Senior totals				27	5	12	17	4

== See also ==
- List of NHL players with 1,000 games played
- List of NHL players with 500 goals
- List of NHL players with 1,000 points
- List of NHL statistical leaders

Preceded by Rod Brind'Amour; Eric Lindros; Roman Cechmanek	Winner of the Bobby Clarke Trophy; 1993; 2000; 2004	Succeeded by Eric Lindros; Roman Cechmanek; Simon Gagne
