= 1993 Men's Ice Hockey World Championships =

1993 edition of the IIHF Men's World Ice Hockey Championship

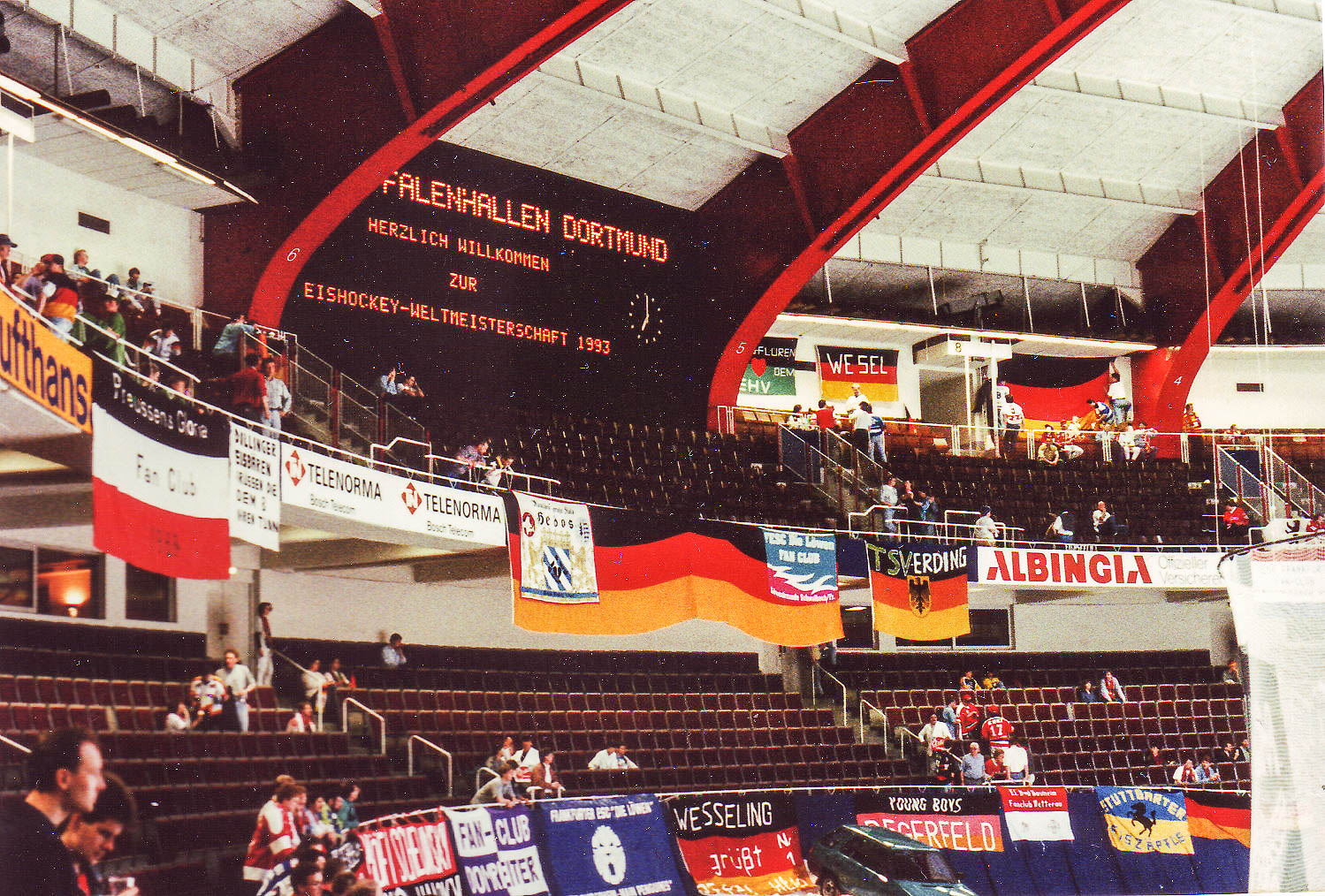
- View of Westfalenhalle during the tournament

Tournament details
- Host country: Germany
- Venues: 2 (in 2 host cities)
- Dates: 18 April – 2 May
- Teams: 12

Final positions
- Champions: Russia (1st title)
- Runners-up: Sweden
- Third place: Czech Republic
- Fourth place: Canada

Tournament statistics
- Games played: 41
- Goals scored: 235 (5.73 per game)
- Attendance: 226,379 (5,521 per game)
- Scoring leader: (Canada) Eric Lindros 17 points

The 1993 Men's Ice Hockey World Championships was the 57th such event sanctioned by the International Ice Hockey Federation (IIHF). Teams representing 32 countries participated in several levels of competition, with an additional six national teams failing to advance from mid-season preliminary qualifying tournaments. The competition also served as qualifications for group placements in the 1994 competition.

The top Championship Group A tournament took place in Germany from 18 April to 2 May 1993, with games played in Munich and Dortmund. Twelve teams took part, with the first round being split into two groups of six, with the four best teams from each group advancing to the quarter-finals. Russia beat the reigning world champions Sweden to win the World Championships for the first time since entering competition after the dissolution of the Soviet Union at the end of 1991. The bronze medal was won by the Czech Republic, defeating Canada in their first major tournament as an independent country after their split with Slovakia at the beginning of the calendar year.

While Latvia had last competed in 1939, this year marked the World Championship debut of three national teams. Kazakhstan, Slovenia, and Ukraine, played for the first time, in Group C. Belarus, Croatia, Estonia, and Lithuania all did not make it out of the autumn qualifiers and had to wait at least another year. Also waiting until the following year was Slovakia, who made their World Championship debut in Group C1 in 1994. The official mascot of this tournament was Bully the penguin.

Eleven of the twelve openings for the Lillehammer Olympics were established in Group A. Switzerland, by being relegated, was excluded, and the final nation had to qualify in a tournament the next fall. The top two teams from Group B, the Group C champion, the top Asian nation, and Slovakia all were given the opportunity to fill the final vacancy.

== World Championship Group A (Germany) ==
=== Group 1 ===
Pos	Team	Pld	W	D	L	GF	GA	GD	Pts
1	Canada	5	5	0	0	31	4	+27	10
2	Sweden	5	3	0	2	17	14	+3	6
3	Russia	5	2	1	2	15	12	+3	5
4	Italy	5	1	2	2	8	20	−12	4
5	Switzerland	5	2	0	3	11	14	−3	4
6	Austria	5	0	1	4	4	22	−18	1

18 April	Italy	2–2	Russia	Munich

18 April	Sweden	1–0	Austria	Munich

19 April	Canada	2–0	Switzerland	Munich

19 April	Russia	4–2	Austria	Munich

20 April	Sweden	1–4	Canada	Munich

20 April	Switzerland	0–1	Italy	Munich

21 April	Italy	2–6	Sweden	Munich

22 April	Switzerland	0–6	Russia	Munich

22 April	Austria	0–11	Canada	Munich

23 April	Switzerland	5–1	Austria	Munich

24 April	Russia	2–5	Sweden	Munich

24 April	Canada	11–2	Italy	Munich

25 April	Sweden	4–6	Switzerland	Munich

25 April	Canada	3–1	Russia	Munich

26 April	Italy	1–1	Austria	Munich

=== Group 2 ===
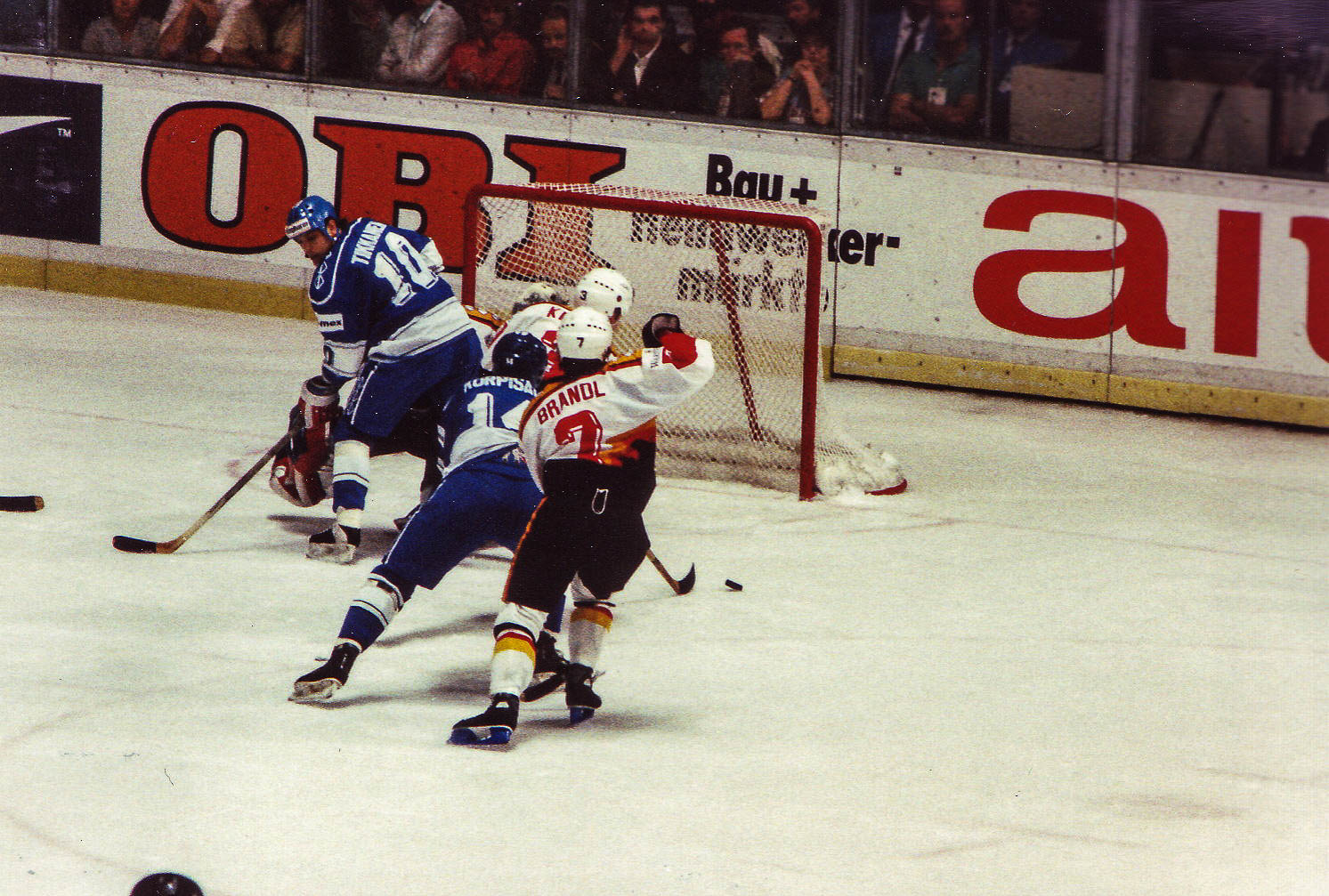
Germany against Finland

Pos	Team	Pld	W	D	L	GF	GA	GD	Pts
1	Czech Republic	5	4	1	0	17	4	+13	9
2	Germany	5	4	0	1	20	12	+8	8
3	United States	5	2	2	1	14	10	+4	6
4	Finland	5	2	1	2	7	7	0	5
5	Norway	5	1	0	4	6	17	−11	2
6	France	5	0	0	5	10	24	−14	0

18 April	Germany	6–0	Norway	Dortmund

18 April	United States	1–1	Czech Republic	Dortmund

19 April	Finland	2–0	France	Dortmund

19 April	Germany	0–5	Czech Republic	Dortmund

20 April	Finland	1–1	United States	Dortmund

21 April	Germany	5–3	France	Dortmund

21 April	Czech Republic	2–0	Norway	Dortmund

22 April	United States	6–1	France	Dortmund

22 April	Norway	0–2	Finland	Dortmund

23 April	Germany	3–1	Finland	Dortmund

23 April	Czech Republic	6–2	France	Dortmund

24 April	United States	3–1	Norway	Dortmund

25 April	Finland	1–3	Czech Republic	Dortmund

25 April	Germany	6–3	United States	Dortmund

26 April	France	4–5	Norway	Dortmund

=== Playoff round ===
Quarterfinals
27 April
Sweden	5
United States	2
28 April
Czech Republic	8
Italy	1
28 April
Canada	5
Finland	1
27 April
Germany	1
Russia	5

Semifinals
30 April
Sweden (OT)	4
Czech Republic	3
30 April
Canada	4
Russia	7

Final
2 May
Sweden	1
Russia	3
Third place
1 May
Czech Republic	5
Canada	1

=== Quarterfinals ===
27 April	Sweden	5–2	United States	Munich

27 April	Germany	1–5	Russia	Munich

28 April	Canada	5–1	Finland	Munich

28 April	Czech Republic	8–1	Italy	Munich

=== Consolation round 9–12 place ===
29 April	Switzerland	1–3	France	Munich

29 April	Norway	2–6	Austria	Munich

=== Semifinals ===
30 April	Sweden	4–3 (OT)	Czech Republic	Munich

30 April	Canada	4–7	Russia	Munich

=== Consolation round 11–12 place ===
1 May	Switzerland	2–5	Norway	Munich

Switzerland was relegated to the Group B.

=== Third Place match ===
1 May	Czech Republic	5–1	Canada	Munich

=== Final ===
2 May	Sweden	1-3	Russia	Munich

Tommy Soderstrom
Goalies
Andrei Trefilov

	0-1	xx:xx − German Titov
	0-2	xx:xx − Andrei Nikolishin
	0-3	xx:xx − Andrei Khomutov
Mikael Renberg − xx:xx	1-3

== World Championship Group B (Netherlands) ==
Played in Eindhoven 25 March to 4 April. The British team, just promoted from Group C, won all their games. Their first game was won by either keen strategy, or controversy, depending on how you view it. With the score against tournament favorite Poland tied three all, the British coach, Alex Dampier, asked the referee to measure the opposing goalie's stick. It was found to be illegal, and Great Britain scored the winning goal on the ensuing powerplay.

Pos	Team	Pld	W	D	L	GF	GA	GD	Pts
13	Great Britain	7	7	0	0	50	13	+37	14
14	Poland	7	6	0	1	71	12	+59	12
15	Netherlands	7	5	0	2	47	20	+27	10
16	Denmark	7	4	0	3	38	24	+14	8
17	Japan	7	3	0	4	34	31	+3	6
18	Romania	7	2	0	5	20	44	−24	4
19	China	7	1	0	6	12	79	−67	2
20	Bulgaria	7	0	0	7	9	58	−49	0

Great Britain was promoted to the Group A while Bulgaria was relegated to the Group C.

25 March	Poland	3–4	Great Britain

25 March	Denmark	5–1	Bulgaria

25 March	Japan	8–1	Romania

25 March	Netherlands	15–1	China

26 March	China	1–21	Poland

26 March	Netherlands	4–2	Romania

27 March	Denmark	0–4	Great Britain

27 March	Bulgaria	1–7	Japan

28 March	Poland	13–0	Romania

28 March	Japan	4–5	Great Britain

28 March	Netherlands	14–0	Bulgaria

29 March	Romania	5–3	China

29 March	Poland	7–3	Denmark

30 March	Great Britain	10–0	Bulgaria

30 March	Denmark	13–0	China

30 March	Netherlands	5–3	Japan

31 March	Bulgaria	2–13	Poland

31 March	Netherlands	2–3	Great Britain

1 April	Romania	3–4	Denmark

1 April	China	3–8	Japan

2 April	Japan	1–7	Poland

2 April	Netherlands	6–4	Denmark

3 April	Great Britain	10–4	Romania

3 April	China	4–3	Bulgaria

4 April	Japan	3–9	Denmark

4 April	Netherlands	1–7	Poland

4 April	Bulgaria	2–5	Romania

4 April	Great Britain	14–0	China

== World Championship Group C (Slovenia) ==
=== Qualifying round ===
All qualifiers were played from 6 to 8 November 1992.

==== Group 1 (Latvia) ====
Played in Riga. The winner qualified for the Group C, and the other two nations had to play each other for inclusion into the Group C2.

Pos	Team	Pld	W	D	L	GF	GA	GD	Pts
1	Latvia	2	2	0	0	19	5	+14	4
2	Estonia	2	1	0	1	9	7	+2	2
3	Lithuania	2	0	0	2	3	19	−16	0

Latvia qualified for the Group C.

6 November 1992	Estonia	6–1	Lithuania

7 November 1992	Latvia	13–2	Lithuania

8 November 1992	Latvia	6–3	Estonia

==== Group 2 (Belarus) ====
Played in Minsk. The top two teams qualified for the Group C. Azerbaijan had the option of playing in this group, but did not.

Pos	Team	Pld	W	D	L	GF	GA	GD	Pts
1	Ukraine	2	1	0	1	8	6	+2	2
2	Kazakhstan	2	1	0	1	6	7	−1	2
3	Belarus	2	1	0	1	4	5	−1	2

Ukraine and Kazakhstan both qualified for the Group C.

6 November 1992	Kazakhstan	5–4	Ukraine

7 November 1992	Belarus	1–4	Ukraine

8 November 1992	Belarus	3–1	Kazakhstan

==== Group 3 (Croatia/Slovenia) ====
Played as a home and home series in Zagreb and Ljubljana. The winner qualified for the Group C, and the loser played the qualifiers for the Group C2. Originally, Luxembourg was to play in this group but declined.

Pos	Team	Pld	W	D	L	GF	GA	GD	Pts
1	Slovenia	2	2	0	0	22	3	+19	4
2	Croatia	2	0	0	2	3	22	−19	0

Slovenia qualified for the Group C.

7 November 1992	Croatia	1–15	Slovenia

8 November 1992	Slovenia	7–2	Croatia

==== Group 4 (Turkey) ====
Played in Ankara. Originally, South Africa was to be in this group as well, but they went directly to the Group C instead.

Pos	Team	Pld	W	D	L	GF	GA	GD	Pts
1	Israel	2	2	0	0	22	6	+16	4
2	Greece	2	1	0	1	12	10	+2	2
3	Turkey	2	0	0	2	6	24	−18	0

Israel qualified for the Group C.

6 November 1992	Turkey	2–10	Greece

7 November 1992	Greece	2–8	Israel

8 November 1992	Turkey	4–14	Israel

=== First round ===
Played from 12 to 18 March. The first and the second-placed team from each group of six advanced to the semifinals. In the finals, the winner gained promotion to the Group B. The three other semi-finalists, together with the two third-placed teams, remained to form the Group C1 in 1994. The remaining six nations would comprise Group C2, effectively being relegated. South Korea defeated Spain 7–3 to win what was expected to be a battle to remain in the Group C. Instead, Group C was divided into two parts, putting them both in the bottom tier.

==== Group 1 ====
Played in Bled.

Pos	Team	Pld	W	D	L	GF	GA	GD	Pts
1	Ukraine	5	4	1	0	102	10	+92	9
2	Latvia	5	4	1	0	94	8	+86	9
3	North Korea	5	3	0	2	30	26	+4	6
4	Belgium	5	2	0	3	19	74	−55	4
5	South Korea	5	1	0	4	16	60	−44	2
6	Israel	5	0	0	5	8	91	−83	0

Belgium, South Korea, and Israel were relegated to the Group C2.

12 March	North Korea	14–2	Israel

12 March	Ukraine	16–1	South Korea

12 March	Latvia	26–3	Belgium

13 March	South Korea	8–5	Israel

13 March	Belgium	2–37	Ukraine

13 March	North Korea	0–4	Latvia

15 March	Belgium	5–3	South Korea

15 March	Israel	0–32	Latvia

15 March	Ukraine	15–2	North Korea

16 March	Belgium	8–1	Israel

16 March	South Korea	4–7	North Korea

16 March	Latvia	5–5	Ukraine

18 March	South Korea	0–27	Latvia

18 March	Israel	0–29	Ukraine

18 March	North Korea	7–1	Belgium

==== Group 2 ====
Played in Ljubljana.

Pos	Team	Pld	W	D	L	GF	GA	GD	Pts
1	Slovenia	5	5	0	0	74	4	+70	10
2	Kazakhstan	5	4	0	1	76	6	+70	8
3	Hungary	5	3	0	2	36	31	+5	6
4	Australia	5	2	0	3	19	51	−32	4
5	Spain	5	1	0	4	18	39	−21	2
6	South Africa	5	0	0	5	8	100	−92	0

Australia, Spain, and South Africa were relegated to the Group C2.

12 March	South Africa	2–20	Hungary

12 March	Kazakhstan	14–0	Spain

12 March	Slovenia	15–2	Australia

13 March	Hungary	1–7	Kazakhstan

13 March	Slovenia	12–0	Spain

13 March	Australia	9–3	South Africa

15 March	Kazakhstan	23–1	Australia

15 March	Hungary	6–5	Spain

15 March	Slovenia	29–0	South Africa

16 March	Spain	3–4	Australia

16 March	South Africa	0–32	Kazakhstan

16 March	Slovenia	14–2	Hungary

18 March	Spain	10–3	South Africa

18 March	Australia	3–7	Hungary

18 March	Slovenia	4–0	Kazakhstan

=== Semifinals ===
19 March	Ukraine	3–2	Kazakhstan

19 March	Slovenia	1–5	Latvia

=== Relegation match ===
21 March	Spain	3–7	South Korea

=== Third place match ===
21 March	Slovenia	3–7	Kazakhstan

=== Final ===
21 March	Ukraine	0–2	Latvia

Latvia was promoted to the Group B.

== Ranking and statistics ==
1993 IIHF World Championship winners

Russia
1st/23rd title

=== Tournament awards ===
- Best players selected by the directorate:
  - Best Goaltender: (Czech Republic) Petr Bříza
  - Best Defenceman: (Russia) Dmitri Yushkevich
  - Best Forward: (Canada) Eric Lindros
- Media All-Star Team:
  - Goaltender: (Czech Republic) Petr Bříza
  - Defence: (Russia) Ilya Byakin, (Canada) Dave Manson
  - Forwards: (Sweden) Ulf Dahlén, (Canada) Eric Lindros, (Sweden) Mikael Renberg

=== Final standings ===
The final standings of the tournament according to IIHF:

1st place, gold medalist(s)	Russia
2nd place, silver medalist(s)	Sweden
3rd place, bronze medalist(s)	Czech Republic
4	Canada
5	Germany
6	United States
7	Finland
8	Italy
9	Austria
10	France
11	Norway
12	Switzerland

=== Scoring leaders ===
List shows the top skaters sorted by points, then goals.

Player	GP	G	A	Pts	+/−	PIM	POS
(Canada) Eric Lindros	8	11	6	17	+16	10	F
(Russia) Andrei Khomutov	8	5	7	12	+8	10	F
(Canada) Shayne Corson	8	3	7	10	+14	6	F
(Canada) Dave Manson	8	3	7	10	+13	22	D
(Russia) Valeri Karpov	8	4	5	9	+6	0	F
(Czech Republic) Petr Rosol	8	4	5	9	+10	10	F
(Canada) Paul Kariya	8	2	7	9	+10	0	F
(Germany) Dieter Hegen	6	6	2	8	+5	10	F
(Sweden) Mikael Renberg	8	5	3	8	+5	6	F
(Czech Republic) Martin Hosták	8	4	4	8	+5	0	F

=== Leading goaltenders ===
Only the top five goaltenders, based on save percentage, who have played 50% of their team's minutes are included in this list.

Player	MIP	GA	GAA	SVS%	SO
(Czech Republic) Petr Bříza	488	10	1.23	.949	2
(Austria) Brian Stankiewicz	239	8	2.01	.946	0
(Canada) Bill Ranford	355	11	1.86	.933	2
(Switzerland) Reto Pavoni	298	12	2.42	.921	0
(Finland) Markus Ketterer	296	10	2.03	.919	1
