= Mikael Renberg =

Swedish ice hockey player

- Born: 5 May 1972 (age 54) Piteå, Sweden
- Height: 6 ft 2 in (188 cm)
- Weight: 235 lb (107 kg; 16 st 11 lb)
- Position: Right wing
- Shot: Left
- Played for: Luleå HF; Philadelphia Flyers; Tampa Bay Lightning; Phoenix Coyotes; Toronto Maple Leafs; Skellefteå AIK
- National team: Sweden
- NHL draft: 40th overall, 1990; Philadelphia Flyers
- Playing career: 1990–2009
Medal record
Representing Sweden
Men's ice hockey
World Championships
Gold medal – first place	1998 Switzerland
Silver medal – second place	1993 Germany
Silver medal – second place	2003 Finland
Bronze medal – third place	2001 Germany
World Junior Championships
Silver medal – second place	1992 Germany

Mikael Bo Renberg (born 5 May 1972) is a Swedish former professional ice hockey player, last playing for Skellefteå AIK in Elitserien. He spent ten seasons in the National Hockey League (NHL) and eight in the Swedish Elite League.

== Playing career ==
Renberg began his NHL career with the Philadelphia Flyers, who drafted him 40th overall in the 1990 NHL entry draft. He set the Flyers' club record for most points in a season scored by a rookie with 82 points (38 goals and 44 assists) in 83 games. Renberg played with them for four seasons and in Philadelphia he became popular with fans for playing on the formidable "Legion of Doom" line with John LeClair and Eric Lindros. Renberg, and the top line helped the team to the 1997 Stanley Cup Finals, where they were swept in four games by the Detroit Red Wings.

After the Stanley Cup run the Flyers offered restricted free agent Chris Gratton a five-year, $16.5M contract which Gratton's former team, the Tampa Bay Lightning, declined to match. Under the NHL's free agency rules the Flyers had to compensate the Lightning with four first-round picks in future NHL entry drafts. Seeking to reacquire the four draft picks Renberg was traded to the Lightning with Karl Dykhuis, and was immediately named the Lightning's captain. 16 months later the teams would virtually undo the trade, sending Renberg back to Philadelphia with Daymond Langkow for Gratton and Mike Sillinger. Renberg played parts of two more seasons for the Flyers until he was traded to the Phoenix Coyotes in exchange for Rick Tocchet a few days before the 2000 NHL trade deadline. He finished the 1999–2000 season with the Coyotes then returned to Sweden to play for Luleå HF. After one season in Sweden he returned to the NHL by signing with the Toronto Maple Leafs. After three seasons in Toronto, Renberg once again returned to play for Luleå HF to be close to his family. After captaining Luleå from 2005 to 2007, he moved onto nearby rival Skellefteå AIK (SAIK). After two seasons with SAIK, Renberg decided to retire due to persistent groin injury problems that cut his final season short.

== International play ==
Renberg's first international experience came at the European Junior Championship, in which he helped Sweden secure a gold medal by scoring 7 goals in 6 game against Europe's top competition. Renberg next wore the three crowns in the 1992 World Juniors and scored six goals and four assists, playing with future NHL stars Peter Forsberg, Michael Nylander, and Markus Näslund. Renberg finished fourth in the scoring behind his three aforementioned countrymen. Despite the high offensive output of the Swedes, they only returned home with a silver medal.

After graduating out of junior, Renberg represented Sweden again at the 1993 World Championships (WC). He continued his torrid international pace by being named to the tournaments' all-star team after netting 5 goals and 3 assists in 8 games. However, like before, Renberg and Sweden again went home with silver.

Prior to 1998 professionals could not participate in the Olympics. As Renberg was in the NHL he could not partake in Team Sweden's gold medal over Canada at the 1994 games in Lillehammer. But for the 1998 Olympics held in Nagano, Japan, Renberg was named to the team to defend its gold and was assigned to play on the first line with friends and countrymen Peter Forsberg and Daniel Alfredsson. Renberg tallied a goal and two assist in Sweden's four game, as the Swedish roster finished in fifth place at the 1998 Olympics playing against older teams in the Canadians, Americans, and Russians.

Renberg would continue representing his country in international tournaments throughout his career. After the Olympic disappointment, at the 1998 WC, Renberg and the Swedes won the gold medal, the first for their country since 1992. Renberg final two WC's were in 2001 and 2003, with the 2001 team taking Renberg home a bronze medal. Renberg's second and final try at the Olympics in 2002 held in Salt Lake City, United States. Again, despite countryman Mats Sundin leading the Olympics in scoring, Renberg and the Swedes went home empty-handed as fifth-place finishers. Unfortunately, Renberg was not a part of the team at the 2006 Olympics where his countrymen led by Nicklas Lidström and Henrik Lundqvist reached the promised land once more to win the gold medal at the Olympic Games.

== Records and milestones ==
- Philadelphia Flyers' franchise record for most points in a season by a rookie, 82 (1993–94)
- Scored 200th NHL career point with an assist vs. Vancouver Canucks (1 December 1996)
- Scored 100th NHL career goal vs. Pittsburgh Penguins (16 February 1997)

== Career statistics ==
=== Regular season and playoffs ===
			Regular season					Playoffs
Season	Team	League	GP	G	A	Pts	PIM	GP	G	A	Pts	PIM
1988–89	Piteå HC	SWE II	12	6	3	9	—	—	—	—	—	—
1989–90	Piteå HC	SWE II	29	15	19	34	—	—	—	—	—	—
1989–90	Luleå HF	SEL	2	1	0	1	0	—	—	—	—	—
1990–91	Luleå HF	SEL	29	11	6	17	12	5	1	1	2	4
1991–92	Luleå HF	SEL	38	8	15	23	20	2	0	0	0	0
1992–93	Luleå HF	SEL	39	19	13	32	61	11	4	4	8	4
1993–94	Philadelphia Flyers	NHL	83	38	44	82	36	—	—	—	—	—
1994–95	Luleå HF	SEL	10	9	4	13	16	—	—	—	—	—
1994–95	Philadelphia Flyers	NHL	47	26	31	57	20	15	6	7	13	6
1995–96	Philadelphia Flyers	NHL	51	23	20	43	45	11	3	6	9	14
1996–97	Philadelphia Flyers	NHL	77	22	37	59	65	18	5	6	11	4
1997–98	Tampa Bay Lightning	NHL	68	16	22	38	34	—	—	—	—	—
1998–99	Tampa Bay Lightning	NHL	20	4	8	12	4	—	—	—	—	—
1998–99	Philadelphia Flyers	NHL	46	11	15	26	14	6	0	0	0	0
1999–00	Philadelphia Flyers	NHL	62	8	21	29	30	—	—	—	—	—
1999–00	Phoenix Coyotes	NHL	10	2	4	6	2	5	1	2	3	4
2000–01	Luleå HF	SEL	48	22	32	54	36	11	6	5	11	35
2001–02	Toronto Maple Leafs	NHL	71	14	38	52	36	3	0	0	0	2
2002–03	Toronto Maple Leafs	NHL	67	14	21	35	36	7	1	0	1	8
2003–04	Toronto Maple Leafs	NHL	59	12	13	25	50	2	0	0	0	4
2004–05	Luleå HF	SEL	22	6	5	11	16	—	—	—	—	—
2005–06	Luleå HF	SEL	44	15	19	34	32	5	0	0	0	10
2006–07	Luleå HF	SEL	48	18	32	50	34	—	—	—	—	—
2007–08	Skellefteå AIK	SEL	41	13	20	33	30	5	0	1	1	4
2008–09	Skellefteå AIK	SEL	21	3	3	6	16	11	0	0	0	2
SEL totals			342	125	149	274	273	54	11	14	25	59
NHL totals			661	190	274	464	372	67	16	21	37	42

=== International ===
International stats are final, as per Mikael Renberg's retirement

Year	Team	Event	Results	GP	G	A	Pts	+/-	PIM
1990	Sweden	EJC	1st place, gold medalist(s)	6	7	1	8	—	6
1992	Sweden	WJC	2nd place, silver medalist(s)	7	6	4	10	—	8
1993	Sweden	WC	2nd place, silver medalist(s)	8	5	3	8	+5	6
1998	Sweden	OG	5th	4	1	2	3	—	4
1998	Sweden	WC	1st place, gold medalist(s)	10	5	3	8	—	6
2001	Sweden	WC	3rd place, bronze medalist(s)	9	4	3	7	+5	6
2002	Sweden	OG	5th	4	1	0	1	+2	4
2003	Sweden	WC	2nd place, silver medalist(s)	9	1	4	5	+5	8
Junior totals				13	13	5	18	—	14
Senior totals				44	17	15	32	+21	34

== Awards ==
- Gold medal at the Junior European Championships in 1990.
- Named to the World Championships All-Star Team in 1993.
- Named to the SEL All-Star team in 1993, 1995, and 2001
- Named to the NHL All-Rookie Team in 1994
- Awarded the Pelle Lindbergh Memorial (Most Improved Player - Philadelphia Flyers) in 1994.
- Awarded the Yanick Dupre Memorial (Class Guy Award - Philadelphia Flyers) in 1995.
- Awarded the Viking Award (Top Swedish player in the NHL) in 1995.
- Gold Medal at the World Championships in 1998.
- Awarded the Golden Puck (Elitserien Player of the Year) in 2001.
- He was inducted into the Piteå Wall of Fame in 2006.

Awards and achievements
Preceded by Mats Sundin	Winner of the Viking Award; 1995	Succeeded by Peter Forsberg
Preceded by Paul Ysebaert	Tampa Bay Lightning captain 1997–98	Succeeded by Rob Zamuner
Preceded by Mikael Johansson	Golden Puck; 2001	Succeeded by Henrik Zetterberg
