= Eric Lindros =

Canadian ice hockey player (born 1973)

OOnt Eric Lindros
- Hockey Hall of Fame, 2016
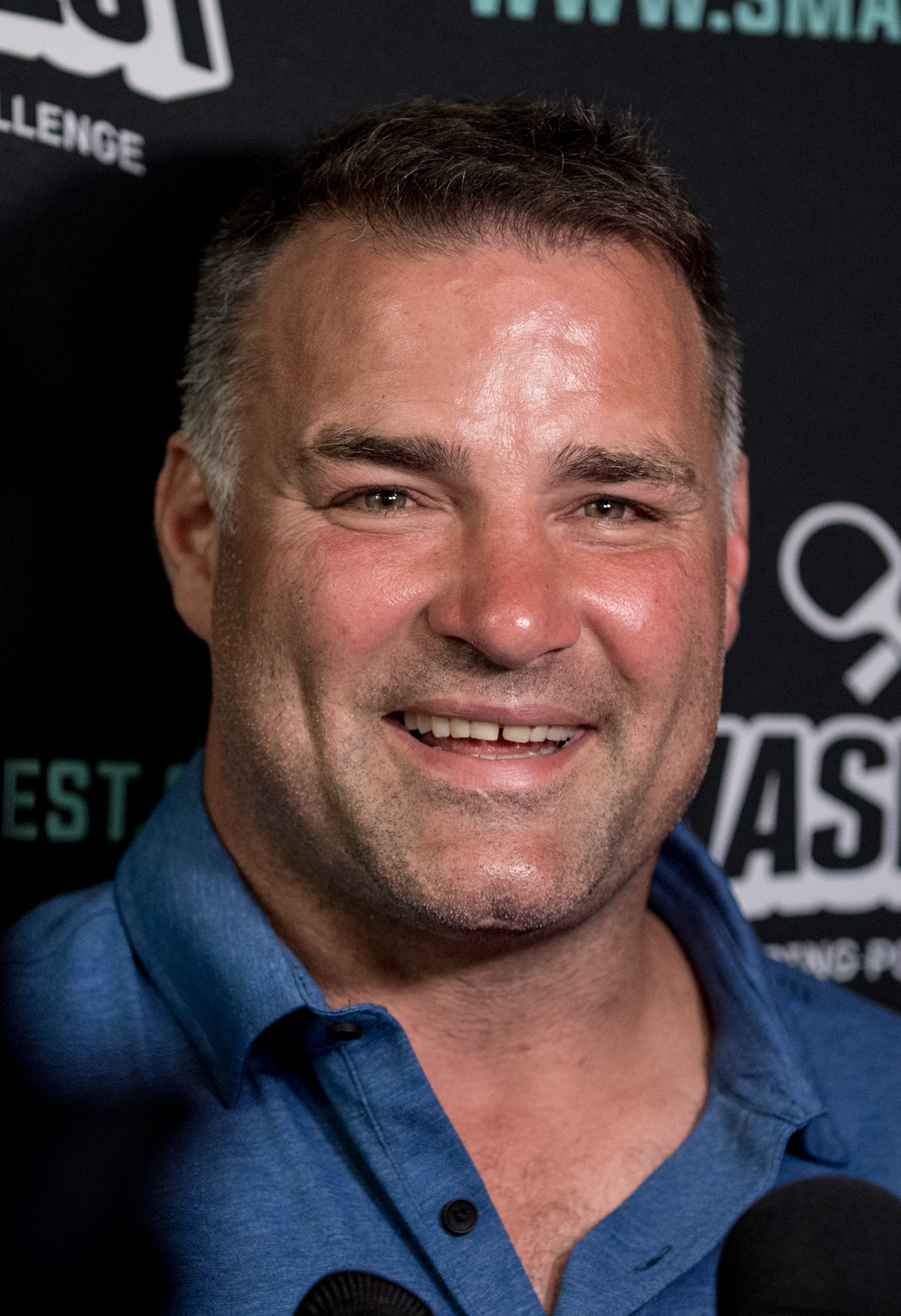
- Lindros in 2016
- Born: February 28, 1973 (age 53) London, Ontario, Canada
- Height: 6 ft 4 in (193 cm)
- Weight: 240 lb (109 kg; 17 st 2 lb)
- Position: Centre
- Shot: Right
- Played for: Philadelphia Flyers; New York Rangers; Toronto Maple Leafs; Dallas Stars
- National team: Canada
- NHL draft: 1st overall, 1991; Quebec Nordiques
- Playing career: 1992–2007
- Website: www.ericlindros.ca

Eric Bryan Lindros OOnt (/ˈlɪndrɒs/; born February 28, 1973) is a Canadian former professional ice hockey player. He played junior hockey in the Ontario Hockey League (OHL) for the Oshawa Generals prior to being chosen first overall in the 1991 NHL entry draft by the Quebec Nordiques. He refused to play for the Nordiques and was eventually traded to the Philadelphia Flyers in June 1992 for a package of players and draft picks including Peter Forsberg. During his OHL career, Lindros led the Generals to a Memorial Cup victory in 1990. Prior to being drafted in 1991, Lindros captured the Red Tilson Trophy as the Most Outstanding Player in the OHL, and also was named the CHL Player of the Year.

Lindros began his National Hockey League (NHL) career with the Flyers during the 1992–93 season. He was an exemplary power forward, and averaged more than a point per game. His hard-nosed style caused him to miss significant time with injuries, and he had many problems with concussions. Lindros captured the Hart Memorial Trophy as the NHL's most valuable player and Lester B. Pearson Award as the most outstanding player after the lockout-shortened 1994–95 season. In August 2001, Lindros joined the New York Rangers via a trade. He then signed with the Toronto Maple Leafs for the 2005–06 season before finishing his career in 2006–07 with the Dallas Stars.

Internationally, Lindros represented Canada at the World Junior Championships three times (1990, 1991 and 1992), winning gold medals in 1990 and 1991. He was Canada's all-time points leader at the World Junior Championships with 31 points until surpassed by Connor Bedard in 2023, five points ahead of Jordan Eberle and Brayden Schenn. Lindros has also represented Canada's senior team at the World Championships, leading the squad in scoring at the 1993 tournament. In the Winter Olympics, Lindros represented Canada three times (1992, 1998 and 2002), winning a silver medal in 1992 and gold in 2002. In 2016, Lindros was inducted into the Ontario Sports Hall of Fame. In 2016, Lindros was inducted into the Hockey Hall of Fame. In 2017, he was named one of the '100 Greatest NHL Players' in history. Lindros' jersey, #88, was retired by the Flyers in 2018.

== Hockey career ==
As a youth, Lindros played in the 1985 and 1987 Quebec International Pee-Wee Hockey Tournament with the Toronto Marlboros and Toronto Young Nationals minor ice hockey teams, respectively.

=== Junior career (1989–1992) ===
As a teenage power forward playing minor hockey, Lindros became nationally famous both for his scoring feats and his ability to physically dominate players older than himself. He attended Monarch Park and later North Toronto Collegiate in Toronto. Both Eric and his younger brother Brett (Eric in 1988–89) played for the Metro Junior "B"'s St. Michael's Buzzers before moving up to the OHL. Lindros' play made him the most highly valued amateur player in North America and he was often nicknamed "The Next One", a reference to Wayne Gretzky's moniker "The Great One." He was also called "The Big E".

Lindros refused to sign with the Sault Ste. Marie Greyhounds after being drafted from St. Michael's. Greyhounds owner Phil Esposito had drafted him anyway, enabling Esposito to sell his share in the team at a higher price. Lindros was traded to the Oshawa Generals instead.

He played parts of three seasons for the Generals from 1990 to 1992, scoring 97 goals and 119 assists for 216 career points in 95 games.

During the 1990–91 season, Lindros won the Eddie Powers Memorial Trophy as top scorer, the Red Tilson Trophy as MVP, the CHL Player of the Year award and the CHL Top Draft Prospect Award. The Generals returned to the Robertson Cup finals, facing Sault Ste. Marie. The series was one of the more dramatic in OHL history given Lindros' attitude toward the team, with fans from the Soo loudly booing him every time he touched the puck. The Greyhounds upset the heavily favoured defending champions in a six-game series, winning the last game on home ice.

On March 6, 2008, the Generals retired his jersey number 88, the second number to be retired by the franchise, and it was declared Eric Lindros Day in Oshawa.

=== 1991 NHL entry draft ===
Lindros was selected first overall by the Quebec Nordiques in the 1991 NHL entry draft, even though Lindros had signaled in advance that he would never play for the Nordiques, citing the ownership. In a 2016 interview, Lindros revealed that this decision was based entirely on the behavior of Nordiques owner and CEO Marcel Aubut, explaining, "The decision to not play for Quebec was based solely on the owner. It had nothing to do with language, culture, [or] city. Keep in mind, my wife is French [from Quebec]. I was not going to play for that individual – period." In one particular meeting between Aubut and the Lindros family, Aubut reportedly made a rude comment in French in front of Lindros' mother Bonnie, not knowing that Bonnie was bilingual.

Despite this, the Nordiques selected Lindros anyway. Aubut publicly announced that they would make Lindros the centrepiece of their franchise turnaround, and refused to trade Lindros, saying that the only way he would play in the NHL would be in a Nordiques uniform. While he awaited a trade, Lindros spent the time playing with the Generals and also participated in the 1992 Winter Olympics, winning a silver medal with Canada.

At the 1992 NHL entry draft, the Nordiques worked out trades involving Lindros with both the Philadelphia Flyers and New York Rangers. The Flyers trade had the Nordiques receiving Steve Duchesne, Ron Hextall, Kerry Huffman, Mike Ricci, the rights to Peter Forsberg, the Flyers' first-round picks in 1993 and 1994, and $15 million. The trade with the Rangers had the Nordiques receiving Tony Amonte, Alexei Kovalev, John Vanbiesbrouck, Doug Weight, three first-round picks (in 1993, 1994 and 1996) and $12 million. Additionally, if Vanbiesbrouck was declared an unrestricted free agent, James Patrick would have replaced him in the deal. The Flyers, believing they had consummated their deal with the Nordiques first, filed a complaint and the NHL announced an independent arbitrator was appointed.

On June 30, 1992, 11 days after the draft, arbitrator Larry Bertuzzi ruled in favor of the Flyers. Bertuzzi determined that the Flyers and Nordiques had agreed to a trade 80 minutes before the Rangers and Nordiques had reached their agreement. Since the Flyers used the 1992 pick to select Ryan Sittler and Quebec had no interest in Sittler, the Flyers and Nordiques had to agree on a substitution for the pick. On July 21, Bertuzzi ruled that Chris Simon and the Flyers' 1994 first-round pick would be added to the trade.

After Lindros was officially traded to the Flyers, he stated that he had been wary of playing for the Nordiques primarily because of what he called a "lack of winning spirit" in the organization. At the time they picked him, the Nordiques had finished dead last in the league for three years in a row. However, in 2016, he told ESPN that his objection to playing in Quebec was based "solely" on Aubut. While he didn't elaborate, he said, "I was not going to play for that individual--period."

=== Philadelphia Flyers ===
With his imposing physical strength and playmaking ability, Lindros established himself as the top player on a Flyers team that had perennially been in contention but always fell short. His time in Philadelphia saw him score points (for much of his first five seasons in the NHL, Lindros hovered around fourth all-time in points per game) and become one of the most feared and dominating players in the NHL. In September 1994, Lindros succeeded Kevin Dineen as Flyers captain. Along with John LeClair and Mikael Renberg, he played on the dreaded "Legion of Doom" line. He scored over 40 goals in each of his first two seasons and won the Hart Memorial Trophy as MVP in the lockout-shortened 1994–95 season after scoring 29 goals and 41 assists in 46 games and leading the Flyers to their first playoff appearance in six years.

Lindros led the Flyers to the 1997 Stanley Cup Finals, handily defeating the Pittsburgh Penguins, Buffalo Sabres and the New York Rangers in five games apiece. In the Finals, however, the Flyers were swept in four games by the Detroit Red Wings; Lindros' only goal came with 14 seconds left in the third period of game 4. Detroit head coach Scotty Bowman used the finesse-oriented defence pairing of Nicklas Lidström and Larry Murphy against Lindros' Legion of Doom line instead of sending out – as everyone, including the Flyers, expected – Vladimir Konstantinov to engage in a physical confrontation.

In 1998, Lindros, at just 25 years of age, was ranked number 54th on The Hockey News' list of the 100 Greatest Hockey Players of all time. The only player of comparable age was 37th-ranked Jaromír Jágr, who was 26 at the time.

Lindros' relationship with Flyers general manager Bobby Clarke soon deteriorated. He and Clarke feuded in the media, with Clarke questioning his toughness; Lindros spent many games on the injured reserve and suffered a series of concussions, the first in 1998 from a hit delivered by Pittsburgh's Darius Kasparaitis that sidelined him for 18 games. Lindros suffered a second concussion in December 1998 that sidelined him for two games. During a game against the Nashville Predators on April 1, 1999, Lindros suffered what was diagnosed as a rib injury. Later that night, the teammate he was sharing a hotel room with, Keith Jones, discovered Lindros lying in a tub, pale and cold. In a call to the Flyers, the trainer was told to put Lindros on a plane that was returning to Philadelphia with injured teammate Mark Recchi. Instead, Jones insisted that Lindros be taken to a nearby hospital and it was discovered Lindros had a collapsed lung caused by internal bleeding of his chest wall. Lindros' father wrote the Flyers a letter in which he stated that if the trainer had followed team orders, Eric would be dead, a statement supported by the doctors who treated him in Nashville.

The 1999–2000 season was Lindros' last as a Flyer. Having suffered his second concussion of the season (fourth overall) in March, Lindros criticized the team's trainers for failing to diagnose a concussion as he played with symptoms following a hit he suffered in a game against the Boston Bruins two weeks prior. Clarke then stripped Lindros of the captaincy for his actions. Lindros sat out the remainder of the regular season and suffered another concussion while rehabilitating for a return to the lineup. Lindros ultimately returned for game 6 of the Eastern Conference finals against the New Jersey Devils; he scored the lone goal in a 2–1 Flyers loss. In game 7 of the series, Lindros was coming over the blue line with his head down, when Devils defenseman Scott Stevens hit Lindros with a shoulder check, knocking him unconscious and causing him to suffer yet another concussion. He was able to get off the ice with help from teammates. The Flyers lost game 7, 2–1 and the series despite leading three games to one, and Lindros became a restricted free agent during the off-season. He refused to accept a two-way qualifying offer with a minor league provision from the Flyers, who still owned his rights. After Lindros was cleared to play in December, the Flyers refused to deal his rights to the Toronto Maple Leafs, as he preferred, and Lindros sat out the entire 2000–01 season.

=== New York Rangers ===
Bobby Clarke eventually traded Lindros to the New York Rangers on August 20, 2001, in exchange for Jan Hlaváč, Kim Johnsson, Pavel Brendl and a 2003 third-round draft choice (Štefan Ružička). The Rangers would also receive a 2003 first-round draft pick if Lindros were to suffer a concussion in the pre-season or the first 50 games of the regular season, and did not return to action for at least 12 months (this pick was never converted).

In 2001–02, Lindros averaged a little over a point a game with 37 goals and 36 assists for 73 points in 72 games. His impressive start also led to his seventh and final All-Star selection, but due to an injury he was unable to participate and was replaced by teammate Mike York. Though 2002–03 was the first injury-free season of his career, he struggled to match his previous season, scoring just 53 points in 81 games. In 2003–04, Lindros' eighth concussion limited him to just 39 games, though he did collect 32 points. He again became an unrestricted free agent after the season.

=== Toronto Maple Leafs ===
On August 11, 2005, after the NHL labour dispute had cancelled the 2004–05 season, Lindros signed a one-year, $1.55 million contract with the Maple Leafs for the 2005–06 season. After a steady start to his tenure with Toronto in which he recorded 22 points in 30 games, Lindros suffered a tear of a ligament in his left wrist against the Dallas Stars on December 10, 2005. After a 27-game absence, Lindros returned to the Toronto lineup on February 28, 2006, his 33rd birthday, against the Washington Capitals. His return was brief, however, as he re-injured his wrist while taking a slapshot in a game against the Ottawa Senators on March 4, effectively ending his season. He had surgery on the wrist at the Hand and Upper Limb Centre in London, Ontario, two days after the game.

=== Dallas Stars and retirement ===
Lindros signed a one-year contract for the 2006–07 season with Dallas on July 17, 2006. He played in 49 regular season games collecting 26 points, and three games in the 2007 playoffs.

Lindros officially announced his retirement on November 8, 2007, in London at the age of 34.

== Post-playing career ==
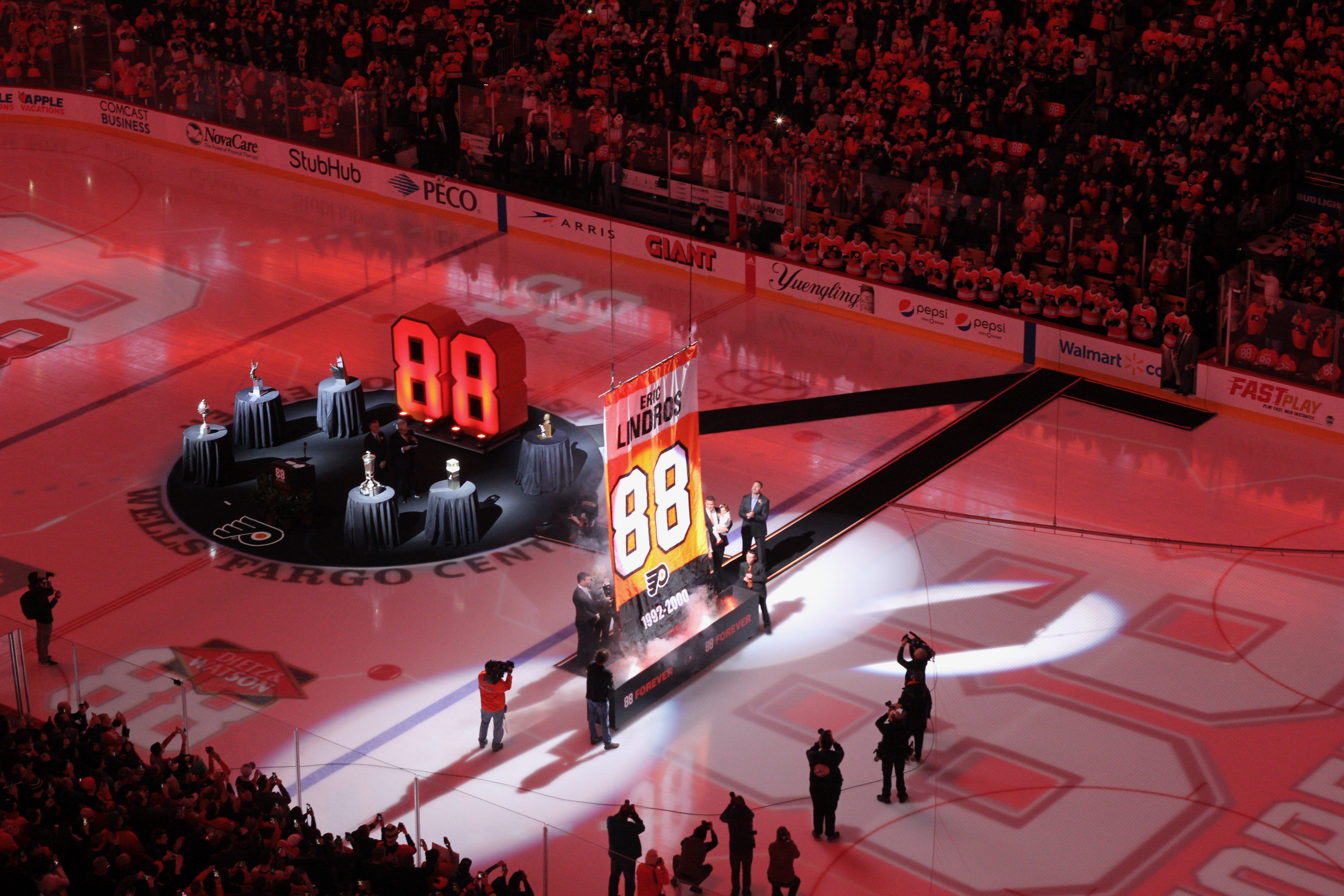
Number retirement ceremony for Lindros on January 18, 2018

On the day of his retirement, November 8, 2007, it was also announced that Lindros had donated $5 million to the London Health Sciences Centre. This donation supports programs such as the Fowler Kennedy Sport Medicine Clinic, and is one of the largest personal donations by a Canadian sports figure.

On November 11, 2007, three days after his retirement, the National Hockey League Players' Association (NHLPA) appointed Lindros to the newly created position of NHLPA ombudsman. Lindros had been involved with the organization throughout his career. Lindros cut ties with the NHLPA, however, on February 3, 2009, resigning as ombudsman after 15 months on the job.

On May 9, 2010, Lindros, along with his mother Bonnie, supermodel/actress Monika Schnarre and a few other Canadian notables, helped Habitat for Humanity Toronto by recognizing Mother's Day by building homes.

On December 31, 2011, he played in the 2012 NHL Winter Classic Alumni Game between the New York Rangers and the Philadelphia Flyers.

In April 2016, Lindros supported Rowan's Law. This was concussion-education legislation named in memory of a teen rugby player from Ottawa who died during a game. The legislation was privately sponsored by Nepean-Carleton MPP Lisa MacLeod. Later MacLeod revealed she knew of rumours relating to alleged sexual misconduct by Patrick Brown, then Ontario Progressive Conservative leader. In 2018 she acknowledged her source had been Lindros.

In June 2016, Lindros was announced as one of four appointees to the 2016 Hockey Hall of Fame induction class, joined by the late Pat Quinn, goaltender Rogie Vachon and Russian winger Sergei Makarov.

On January 14, 2017, Lindros reunited with his former "Legion of Doom" linemates John LeClair and Mikael Renberg to play in the 50th Anniversary Alumni game between the Pittsburgh Penguins and the Philadelphia Flyers.

In a 2017 interview on French Canadian television, he opened up about his time being drafted by the Nordiques. He later stated that he had no problem with Quebec City or the people, stating that his wife is French Canadian. He stated that the real reason was he did not respect Marcel Aubut and would never play for him. At the end of the interview, he was given the Nordiques igloo and fleur-de-lis jersey at last, 26 years after the saga began.

On January 18, 2018, the Flyers retired Lindros' no. 88 jersey in a pre-game ceremony at the Wells Fargo Center.

== Personal life ==
The oldest son of Carl Lindros and Bonnie Roszell-Lindros, Lindros has Swedish heritage. The name "Lindros" means "rose of the linden tree." His great-grandfather Axel immigrated to Canada from Bredaryd, a small village in Sweden.

Eric is the third generation of the Lindros family to be born in Canada. His father Carl Lindros received a Bachelor of Arts degree from the University of Western Ontario (where he played football, and was drafted 30th overall by the Canadian Football League's Edmonton Eskimos in the 1970 CFL College Draft), and became a chartered accountant. Lindros' mother Bonnie is a registered nurse. Lindros has one brother, Brett, and one sister, Robin. Brett played for the New York Islanders and retired after 51 games, due to post-concussion syndrome.

The book Fire on Ice, co-written with Randy Starkman and published in October 1991 by HarperCollins, chronicled the life and early hockey career of Lindros.

In 2012, Lindros married Kina Lamarche, a native Québécoise and former president of the North American wing of Travelex. They have three children: Carl Pierre, and twins Sophie and Ryan. Lindros and his family currently reside in Toronto. They are close friends with Goldie Hawn and Kurt Russell, with both families owning a cottage on Lake Rosseau in Muskoka, Ontario.

Lindros was made a member of the Order of Ontario for the class of 2022.

== Career statistics ==
=== Regular season and playoffs ===
			Regular season					Playoffs
Season	Team	League	GP	G	A	Pts	PIM	GP	G	A	Pts	PIM
1988–89	St. Michael's Buzzers	CJBHL	37	24	43	67	193	27	23	25	48	155
1988–89	Canadian National Team	Intl	2	1	0	1	0	—	—	—	—	—
1989–90	Detroit Compuware Ambassadors	NAHL	14	23	29	52	123	—	—	—	—	—
1989–90	Canadian National Team	Intl	3	1	0	1	4	—	—	—	—	—
1989–90	Oshawa Generals	OHL	25	17	19	36	61	17	18	18	36	76
1989–90	Oshawa Generals	M-Cup	—	—	—	—	—	4	0	9	9	12
1990–91	Oshawa Generals	OHL	57	71	78	149	189	16	18	20	38	93
1991–92	Oshawa Generals	OHL	13	9	22	31	54	—	—	—	—	—
1991–92	Canadian National Team	Intl	24	19	16	35	34	—	—	—	—	—
1992–93	Philadelphia Flyers	NHL	61	41	34	75	147	—	—	—	—	—
1993–94	Philadelphia Flyers	NHL	65	44	53	97	103	—	—	—	—	—
1994–95	Philadelphia Flyers	NHL	46	29	41	70	60	12	4	11	15	18
1995–96	Philadelphia Flyers	NHL	73	47	68	115	163	12	6	6	12	43
1996–97	Philadelphia Flyers	NHL	52	32	47	79	136	19	12	14	26	40
1997–98	Philadelphia Flyers	NHL	63	30	41	71	134	5	1	2	3	17
1998–99	Philadelphia Flyers	NHL	71	40	53	93	120	—	—	—	—	—
1999–00	Philadelphia Flyers	NHL	55	27	32	59	83	2	1	0	1	0
2001–02	New York Rangers	NHL	72	37	36	73	138	—	—	—	—	—
2002–03	New York Rangers	NHL	81	19	34	53	141	—	—	—	—	—
2003–04	New York Rangers	NHL	39	10	22	32	60	—	—	—	—	—
2005–06	Toronto Maple Leafs	NHL	33	11	11	22	43	—	—	—	—	—
2006–07	Dallas Stars	NHL	49	5	21	26	70	3	0	0	0	4
NHL totals			760	372	493	865	1,398	53	24	33	57	122

=== International ===
Medal record

Men's Ice hockey

Representing Canada

Winter Olympics
Gold medal – first place	2002 Salt Lake City	
Silver medal – second place	1992 Albertville	

World Junior Championships
Gold medal – first place	1990 Finland	
Gold medal – first place	1991 Canada	

Year	Team	Event	GP	G	A	Pts	PIM
1990	Canada	WJC	7	4	0	4	14
1991	Canada	WJC	7	6	11	17	6
1991	Canada	CC	8	3	2	5	8
1992	Canada	WJC	7	2	8	10	12
1992	Canada	OLY	8	5	6	11	5
1993	Canada	WC	8	11	6	17	10
1996	Canada	WCH	8	3	3	6	10
1998	Canada	OLY	6	2	3	5	2
2002	Canada	OLY	6	1	0	1	8
Junior totals			21	12	19	31	32
Senior totals			44	25	20	45	43

=== All-Star Games ===
Year	Location	G	A	P
1994	Madison Square Garden	1	0	1
1996	FleetCenter	1	0	1
1997	San Jose Arena	0	2	2
1998	General Motors Place	1	0	1
1999	Ice Palace	0	0	0
2000	Air Canada Centre	0	0	0
All-Star totals		3	2	5

== Awards and achievements ==
Award	Year
NHL
NHL All-Rookie Team	1993
NHL All-Star Game	1994, 1996, 1997, 1998, 1999, 2000, 2002
NHL First All-Star Team	1995
NHL Second All-Star Team	1996
Hart Memorial Trophy	1995
Lester B. Pearson Award	1995
One of 100 Greatest NHL Players	2017
Philadelphia Flyers
Bobby Clarke Trophy	1994, 1995, 1996, 1999
Junior
Jack Ferguson Award	1989
Eddie Powers Memorial Trophy	1991
Red Tilson Trophy	1991
OHL First Team All-Star	1991
CHL Player of the Year	1991
Memorial Cup All-Star	1991
OHL Top Draft Prospect Award	1991
International
World Junior Championships All-Star team	1991
World Junior Championships Best Forward	1991
Winter Olympics All-Star team	1992
World Championship All-Star team	1993
World Championship Best Forward	1993

== Quotes ==
=== By Lindros ===
- "Right now my focus is the 'PA work, I'm not really concerned about the rest of it. But the last couple of years have been pretty frustrating in terms of not getting through without being injury-free. It's just frustrating."
- "My decision to retire from professional hockey is something that I have been considering for some time and did not come easily. I will miss the day-to-day activity of being a member of a team and the camaraderie that I developed with my teammates will never be forgotten. I played with the best, I played against the best – it was a blast. It really truly was. I enjoyed myself immensely."

=== About Lindros ===
- "Eric Lindros was an OHL locomotive – a teenage blend of skill and speed and snarl and size that, until observed in him, had been observed in no one – history called. Context was needed. Tagging him as "The Next One" made sense.
- "He had it all: size, strength and finesse, It is unfortunate injuries cut his time in the NHL short, but he had a great career and left his mark on the game." – John LeClair.
- "Yes, based on his ability to play the game and based on his contributions as a player, I think you have to separate all the crap that went on. Particularly when he played for the Flyers, it was just outstanding, dominant hockey – the first of the huge, big men with small man's skill." – Bobby Clarke, on whether Lindros should be in the Hockey Hall of Fame.

Awards and achievements
Preceded by Drake Berehowsky	Jack Ferguson Award; 1989	Succeeded by Pat Peake
Preceded by Owen Nolan	NHL first overall draft pick 1991	Succeeded by Roman Hamrlík
Preceded by Owen Nolan	Quebec Nordiques first-round draft pick 1991	Succeeded by Todd Warriner
Preceded by Mike Ricci	CHL Player of the Year; 1991	Succeeded by Charles Poulin
Preceded by Mark Recchi; John LeClair	Winner of the Bobby Clarke Trophy; 1994, 1995, 1996; 1999	Succeeded by John LeClair; Mark Recchi
Preceded by Sergei Fedorov	Winner of the Hart Trophy; 1995	Succeeded by Mario Lemieux
Sporting positions
Preceded by Kevin Dineen	Philadelphia Flyers captain 1994–2000	Succeeded by Éric Desjardins
