= Jerome Bettis trade =

NFL draft day trade

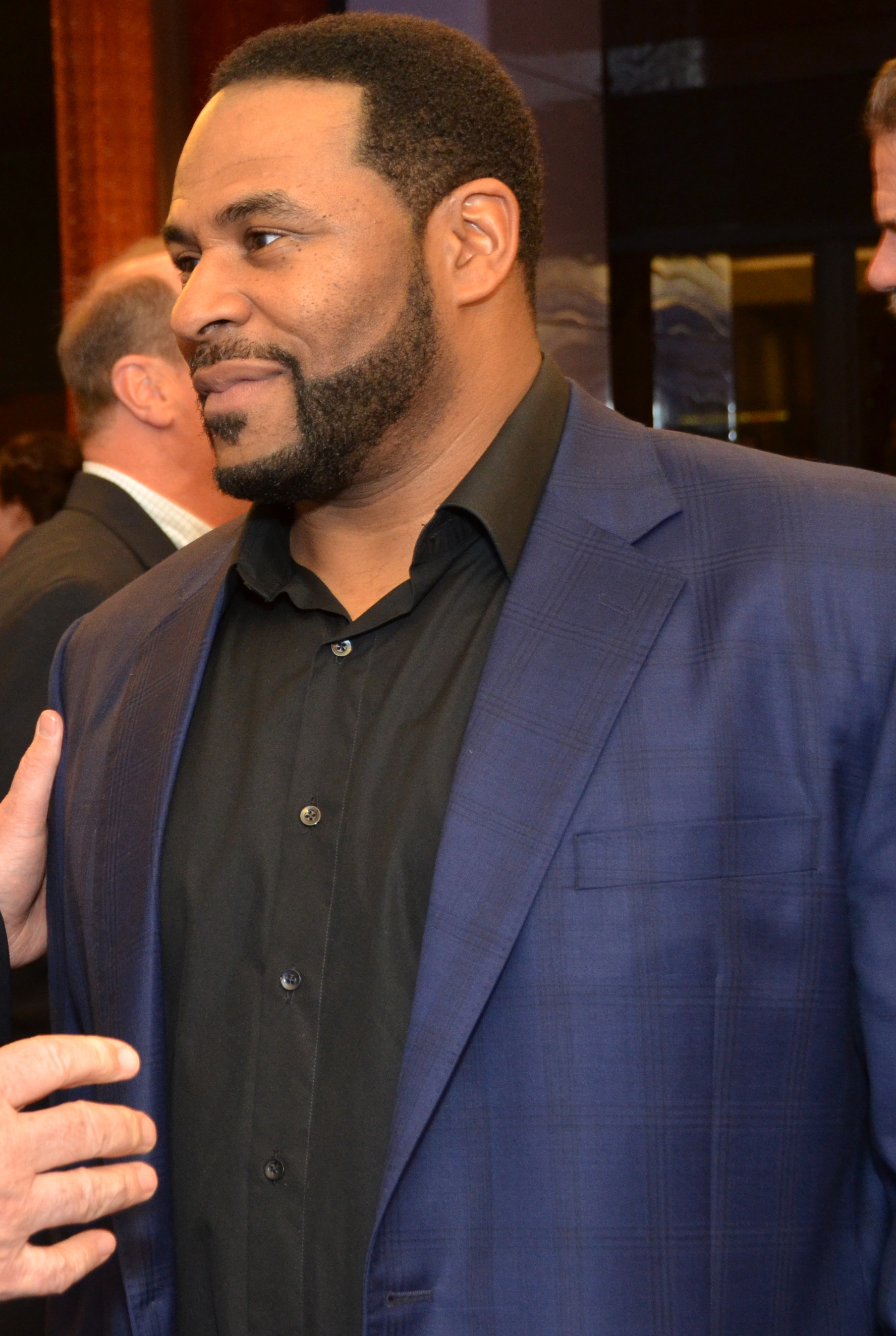
Jerome Bettis, the centerpiece of the trade.

The Jerome Bettis trade was a trade between the Pittsburgh Steelers and the St. Louis Rams of the National Football League (NFL). The trade occurred on April 20, 1996, the same day as the first day of the 1996 NFL draft. The Rams were trying to transition to more of a passing offense and felt that running back Jerome Bettis was already on the downside of his career while also feeling that Nebraska running back Lawrence Phillips would be a better fit for their offense. Bettis was traded, along with the Rams' third round pick in 1996, to the Steelers in exchange for their second round pick in 1996 and their fourth round picks in the 1997 NFL draft.

While the compensation to the Rams by the Steelers was small compared to the Herschel Walker trade and the forthcoming Ricky Williams trade, the deal had longstanding impacts on both franchises. Coupled with Phillips subsequently becoming a draft bust due to off-the-field issues, the trade has since become one of the more lopsided deals in NFL history, strongly favoring the Steelers and eventually leading to Bettis's induction to the Pro Football Hall of Fame in 2015.

== Background ==
The then-Los Angeles Rams had selected Bettis with their first round pick in the 1993 NFL draft, and the bruising halfback from Notre Dame flourished under the offense of head coach Chuck Knox, gaining 2,454 rushing yards his first two seasons and being named the consensus NFL Offensive Rookie of the Year in 1993. However, Bettis was one of the few bright spots for the Rams at this time, as the team struggled to losing seasons in both of his first two years in the NFL and leading to Knox's dismissal following the 1994 NFL season.

In 1995, the Rams moved east to St. Louis, bringing in former Oregon head coach Rich Brooks to be their new head coach. Brooks installed a more passing-oriented offense, and Bettis was limited to 637 yards, a significant dropoff from his 1993 and 1994 totals. Some sports journalists, knowing the short lifespan of running backs in the NFL, thought Bettis might already be done. The coaching staff did as well; Brooks asked Bettis whether he wanted to move back to his college position of fullback for the upcoming 1996 season or preferred to be traded. By this time, most NFL teams had transitioned the fullback to a lead blocking role. While Bettis's size made him well-suited to lead block, he asked to be traded, believing he could still help an NFL team with his running.

Meanwhile, the Rams saw potential in Nebraska running back Lawrence Phillips, and planned to select him in the 1996 NFL draft even though his well-documented off-the-field issues gave other NFL teams pause.

== The trade ==
The Rams had interest from teams for Bettis's services, primarily the Pittsburgh Steelers and the Houston Oilers, both of whom had run-heavy offenses. For the Oilers part, the team was entering its second full season under head coach Jeff Fisher and was still rebuilding from its late 1980s-early 1990s success after a threat from owner Bud Adams was followed through on blowing up that organization if it didn't reach the Super Bowl. The team had also announced a move to Nashville for the 1998 NFL season, which was expedited by one year due to lame duck status in Houston.

With the Steelers, head coach Bill Cowher had been enamored by Bettis since his rookie season, when he had his breakout game in Week 2 against the Steelers by rushing for 76 yards and one touchdown (including a 29-yard run) in a 27-0 Rams win, and couldn't believe that Bettis was available for trade. Cowher had a balanced offense during his first four years, having a power running back during each of those years, first with Barry Foster (a holdover from Chuck Noll's tenure), then with Bam Morris after injuries cut Foster's career short. In all of those years, the team's offense was led by quarterback Neil O'Donnell. Coming off an appearance in Super Bowl XXX, O'Donnell left in free agency while Morris was arrested for marijuana possession, creating a void at running back while the Steelers were transitioning into a run-oriented team.

When Bettis was given the choice, he chose the Steelers over the Oilers due to the team's stronger history. With a team in place, the Rams and Steelers worked out a deal:

Traded to Pittsburgh

- Running back Jerome Bettis
- 1996 third round pick (72nd overall, used to select Steve Conley)

Traded to St. Louis

- 1996 second round pick (59th overall, used to select Ernie Conwell)
- 1997 fourth round pick (121st overall, later traded to the Miami Dolphins, used to select Jerome Daniels; the Rams received the 112th pick in exchange, used on Ryan Tucker)

With the team out of the running for Bettis, the Oilers selected Ohio State running back Eddie George with their first-round pick in the draft. The deal was initially reported during ESPN's coverage of the draft by ESPN reporter & ex-Steeler Mark Malone, and confirmed by the NFL shortly after the start of the 2nd round.

== Reaction and aftermath ==
Many sports journalists initially felt that the Rams got the better end of the deal due to the relatively high compensation for Bettis, feeling that he was already on the decline at 24. Even journalists in Pittsburgh felt that the price was high. They also felt that with Bettis being a pending free agent in 1997 with the expiration of his rookie contract, the trade put the Steelers into a catch-22 situation. The argument was that even if Bettis were successful, he would become too expensive to retain due to the Steelers being up against the salary cap.

Additionally, the Steelers rarely made trades at the time. Since Noll's tenure, they had usually preferred to build through the draft. For this reason, they were initially criticized for making the deal. It also upended their draft strategy; before the Bettis trade was confirmed by the NFL, the Steelers selected North Carolina A&T offensive lineman Jamain Stephens over Purdue fullback Mike Alstott with their first-round pick; it had been speculated that the Steelers would have selected Alstott over Stephens had Bettis not been available for trade. Had the Bettis trade fell through after the pick, the Steelers would have been left without a power running back, as Morris pled guilty to possession charges in June and be subsequently released by the team. Additionally, Alstott went on to a successful 12-year career with the Tampa Bay Buccaneers as a three-time All-Pro while Stephens was infamously cut on the first day of training camp in 1999 after failing to complete a 40-yard dash.

As it turned out, the trade to Pittsburgh was the best thing to happen to Bettis' career. He more than rebounded in 1996 with a then career-high 1,431 yards rushing and 11 touchdowns, being voted NFL Comeback Player of the Year. He quickly became a fan favorite in Pittsburgh. This included a Week 10 matchup at Three Rivers Stadium against the Rams, in which Bettis rushed for 129 yards and two touchdowns in the Steelers 42–6 win. Although Bettis doesn't hold any ill will towards the Rams organization (which moved back to Los Angeles in 2016), he never returned to St. Louis as a player due to NFL scheduling rotations and the Steelers and Rams playing in separate conferences.

The Steelers signed Bettis to a contract extension at the expense of several veterans due to the salary cap, notably fellow Hall of Famer Rod Woodson and Bettis' backup Erric Pegram. Despite that, Bettis finished his career after the 2005 NFL season as the fifth all-time leading rusher in NFL history. The Steelers won Super Bowl XL in what would be Bettis' last game; he announced his retirement at the Vince Lombardi Trophy presentation.

While both the players the Rams selected from their picks related to the trade (Conwell and Tucker) were on their Super Bowl XXXIV roster in 1999, neither were significant contributors to The Greatest Show on Turf, nor did any of the players selected with the picks related to the Bettis trade in general have successful NFL careers, or at least one on the level of Bettis. This included Phillips, whose off-the-field issues from college continued in the NFL. The Rams (by this point led by Dick Vermeil) cut Phillips midway into the 1997 season. Phillips would be out of the NFL altogether by 1999. He went to prison in 2008 and died by suicide in 2016 following a murder of his cellmate and pending charges against Phillips. As the Rams would not have a featured back until they traded for Marshall Faulk in 1999 to kick-start the Greatest Show on Turf era, the trade has since been ranked as one of the most lopsided trades in NFL history, and one of the most lopsided in professional sports history.

== See also ==
- Brock for Broglio
- Deshaun Watson trade
- Eric Lindros trade
- Herschel Walker trade
- Ricky Williams trade
- White Flag Trade
- List of largest National Football League trades
