= Luka Dončić–Anthony Davis trade =

2025 National Basketball Association trade

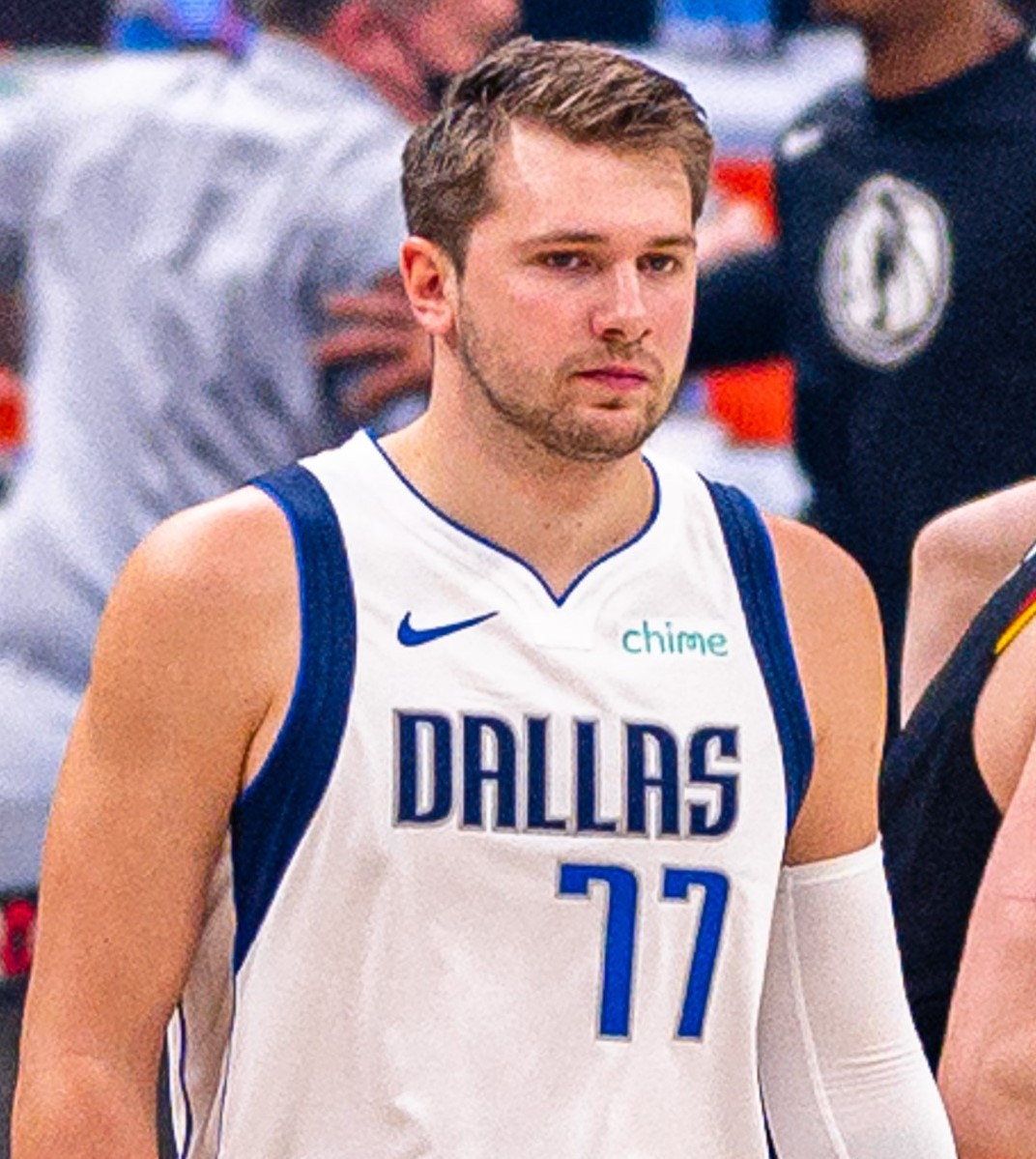
Luka Dončić

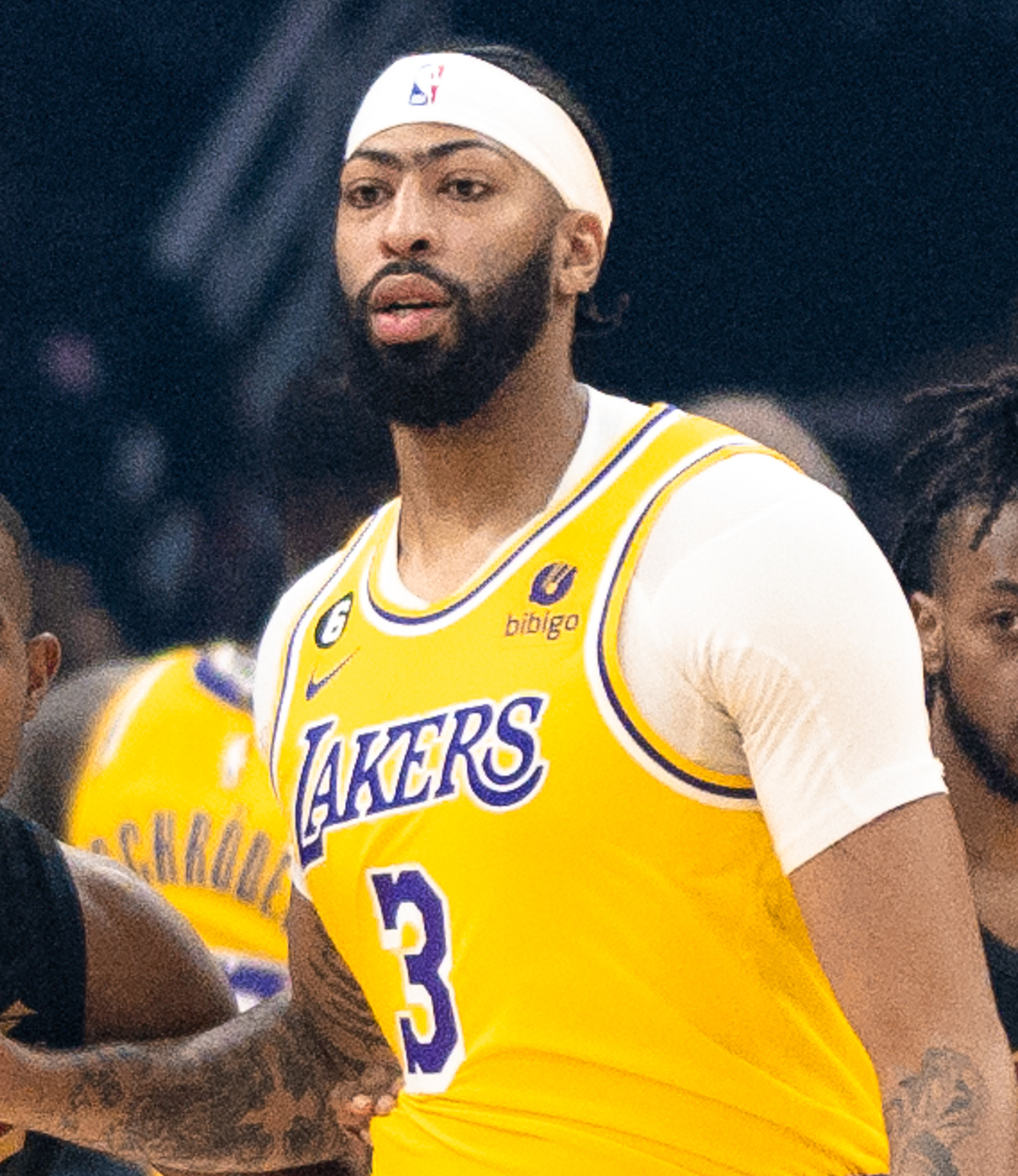
Anthony Davis

The Luka Dončić–Anthony Davis trade was a National Basketball Association (NBA) trade made on the night of February 1–2, 2025, which saw Luka Dončić traded from the Dallas Mavericks to the Los Angeles Lakers for Anthony Davis in a three-team deal facilitated by the Utah Jazz. It was the first time in NBA history that two reigning All-NBA Team players were traded for each other midseason. It is considered one of the most unexpected and lopsided trades in NBA history, even though the Mavericks still received an All-NBA player, as Dončić was perceived as one of the best players in his generation and was almost six years younger than Davis. Previously considered directionless, the Lakers built a contending team around Dončić. Conversely, the Mavericks' title window was effectively closed by the trade, injury to Kyrie Irving, and recurring injury problems with Davis. The Mavericks subsequently transitioned to rebuild around first overall draft pick Cooper Flagg.

At the time of the trade, Dončić, who led the Mavericks to the 2024 NBA Finals and had made five consecutive All-NBA First Teams and All-Star appearances (every year other than his rookie season), had established himself as the cornerstone of the franchise. The popular perception was that the Mavericks would never trade him, with Dončić himself stating that he wanted to spend his entire career in Dallas. The Mavericks stated that they traded Dončić to improve the team's defense, and the Mavericks also had concerns about his behavior, work ethic and conditioning, as he reportedly weighed as much as 270 pounds (120 kg). Their belief that Dončić would not be able to improve his fitness was disproven when Dončić underwent a physical transformation after the Lakers' playoff exit, appearing in a Men's Health Magazine article. However, Davis had equal, if not worse, health concerns throughout his career and was significantly injured whilst in Dallas, calling into question the Mavericks' motivations and drawing further criticism of the trade.

Journalists have called the transaction one of the most unexpected trades in NBA and American sports history, with many media members, fans and NBA players criticizing it and expressing shock as Dončić had not even requested a trade and was an All-NBA player in his prime. The overwhelming consensus was that the Lakers won the trade. Mavericks fans reacted negatively to the trade and protested it after the announcement, with many calling for the firing of general manager Nico Harrison. The trade received revived scrutiny when the Mavericks obtained the first overall pick from the NBA draft lottery (used to select Flagg) in the 2025 NBA draft, despite having just a 1.8% chance of obtaining the #1 pick, resulting in accusations that the lottery result was rigged and meant as compensation for the lopsided trade.

Harrison was fired by the Mavericks on November 11, 2025, which many commentators attributed to the negative backlash to the trade and the team's sluggish start to the 2025–26 season. The Mavericks traded Davis to the Washington Wizards during the same season in exchange for 4 role players and minimal draft capital. Davis played in 29 regular-season games, in which Dallas had a record of 16–13. He missed 54 of a possible 83 regular-season games, also missing the playoffs. Irving and Davis played 25 minutes together for the Mavericks.

== Background ==
=== Luka Dončić ===
At the age of 19, Luka Dončić was drafted by the Atlanta Hawks 3rd overall in the 2018 NBA draft as the most hyped European prospect in NBA history. In a draft-night trade, he was dealt to the Dallas Mavericks for the 5th overall pick (Trae Young) and a protected 2019 first-round pick (later used to draft Cam Reddish 10th overall). When he joined the NBA, he was one of the most coveted prospects in basketball due to his accomplishments at Real Madrid, where he was the 2017–18 EuroLeague MVP and led his team to the EuroLeague title. Dončić's arrival was seen as the beginning of a new era for the Mavericks, as the illustrious career of team legend Dirk Nowitzki was coming to a close. Nowitzki played one season with Dončić before retiring in 2019.

Dončić quickly became the face of the franchise, winning the 2018–19 NBA Rookie of the Year award. In 2019–20, he was selected to his first All-Star team and All-NBA First Team, and led the Mavericks to the 2020 NBA playoffs. In 2022, the team reached the Western Conference Finals for the first time since their 2011 championship run. In 2024, the team reached the NBA Finals, losing in five games to the Boston Celtics. Despite the loss, Dončić became just the second player in NBA history to lead the playoffs in total points, rebounds, and assists.

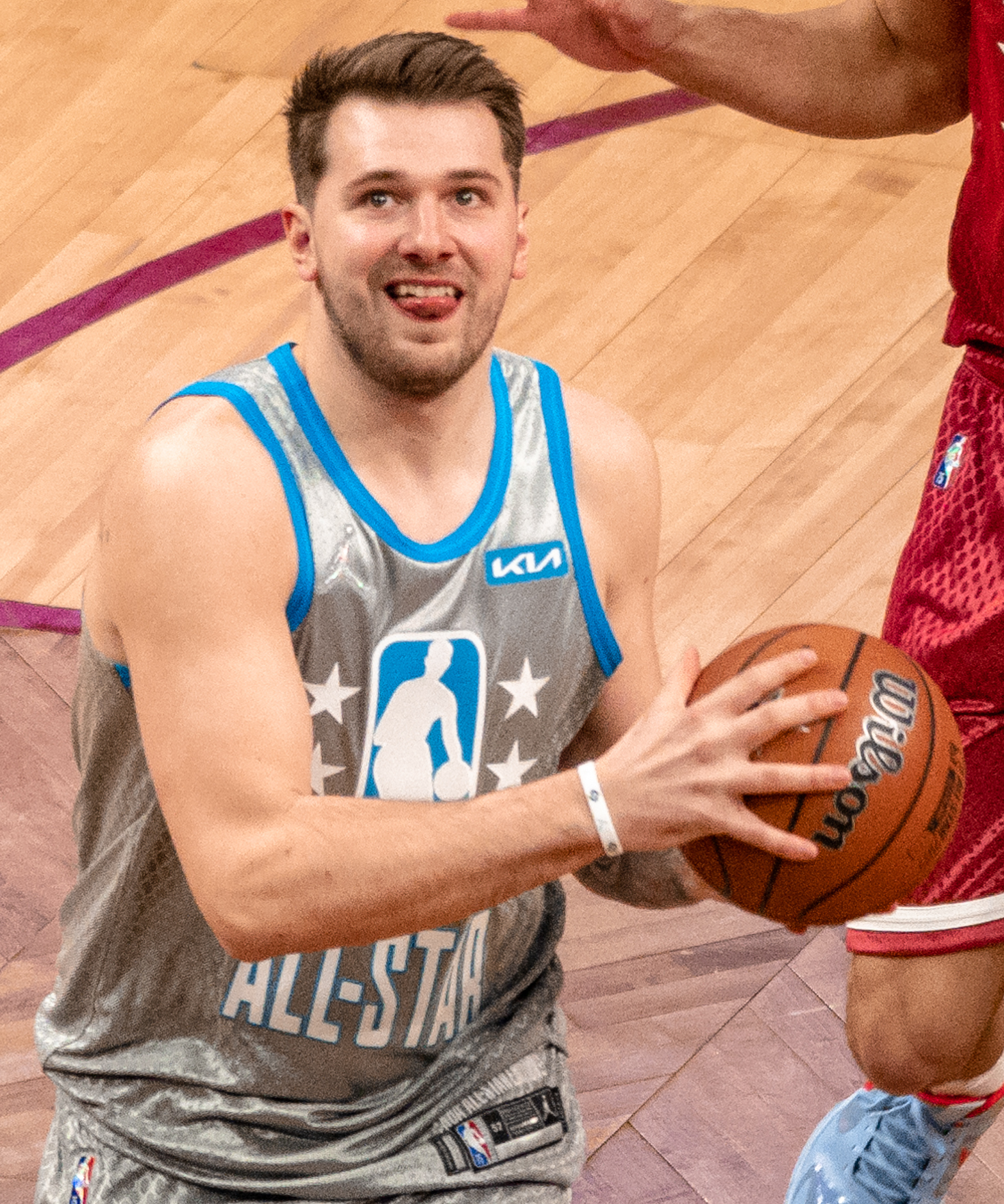
Luka during the 2022 All Star game whilst still with the Mavericks

During Dončić's six-and-a-half seasons with Dallas, he made the All-NBA First Team five times and the NBA All-Star Team five times. Dončić became the first player in NBA history to make five All-NBA First Teams through age 24. Along with Larry Bird, George Gervin, and Tim Duncan, he is one of only four players to earn five All-NBA First Team selections in their first six seasons since the ABA–NBA merger. He is the Mavericks' franchise leader in career triple-doubles, and holds the record for most points (2,370) in a Mavericks season and highest scoring game (73 points). In 2022, Dončić signed a five-year, $215 million maximum contract with the Mavericks, including a player option for 2026–27.

=== Anthony Davis ===
Anthony Davis was drafted by the New Orleans Pelicans first overall at the 2012 NBA draft after winning the 2012 NCAA Division I championship with the Kentucky Wildcats. Davis played seven seasons with the Pelicans, during which he made the All-NBA First Team three times. During the 2018–19 season, Davis announced he would decline to extend his contract with the Pelicans and requested a trade, and the Pelicans subsequently traded him to the Los Angeles Lakers during the 2019 offseason (with the Pelicans receiving Lonzo Ball, Brandon Ingram, Josh Hart and three first-round draft picks).

The Lakers won the 2020 NBA Finals in Davis' first year with the team, where he played an integral role as the main co-star alongside LeBron James, who shifted into a supplementary role alongside Dončić. The Lakers had not achieved much playoff success since their 2020 title other than making the Conference Finals in the 2022–23 season. Davis also helped the Lakers win the inaugural NBA Cup during the 2023–24 season. After joining the Lakers, Davis made the All-NBA First Team in 2020, the All-NBA Second Team in 2024, and the All-Defensive First Team in 2020 and 2024. He was an NBA All-Star in 2020, 2021, 2024, and 2025. However, he was plagued by injuries during the 2020–21, 2021–22, and 2022–23 seasons. In 2023, he signed a three-year, $186 million maximum contract extension that tied him to the Lakers through 2028, which was the largest extension in NBA history at the time by annual dollar value.

== Timeline and rationale ==
=== Trading Dončić ===
Mavericks then-general manager Nico Harrison was a longtime admirer of Anthony Davis. He said that "defense wins championships", that Davis was "one of the best two-way players in the league" and that "I believe that getting an All-Defensive and an All-NBA player with a defensive mindset gives us a better chance. We're built to win now and in the future". In 2024–25, Davis had been putting together one of his best seasons for the Lakers, statistically trending even better than his 2019–20 campaign when the Lakers won the title. He was also healthy that season, despite playing out of his preferred position at center with the Lakers, and he was expected to increase his production once he was playing at power forward with the Mavericks. Harrison, who used to work for Anthony Davis's sponsor Nike and has known Davis since the latter was in high school, added that Davis exemplified "the culture that we want to create." Harrison was criticised for this and other interviews.

In addition, it was reported that Harrison and other Mavericks staffers were unhappy about Dončić's conditioning and diet and disagreed with Dončić about his strength and training regimen, who also used his own team of doctors instead of the Mavericks' physicians. The Lakers themselves posted a job opening for a new head strength and conditioning coach shortly after Dončić arrived. Harrison, "a notorious nutrition devotee", worried that Dončić's poor conditioning would lead to future injuries. This was in spite of the Mavericks' roster already being crippled by injuries and Davis' well-documented injury history. One Mavericks executive stated "Whenever you trade a truly great player, it's going to hurt. We love AD, and we feel like we're in a good position to have a great team moving forward. With better health this year, we'll be near the top of the conference going into the playoffs. That's the goal".

For example, at the start of the 2024–25 season, Dončić gained over a dozen pounds when rehabbing from a calf strain and reinjured his calf after returning, which Harrison attributed to Dončić's poor conditioning. Harrison terminated several Mavericks sports performance professionals, including performance director Casey Smith, who had been with the team for 21 years and was out of the state tending to his gravely ill mother at the time. Smith was reportedly let go from the Mavericks in part for being "too negative", and he was subsequently hired by the New York Knicks. According to ESPN's Tim MacMahon, some employees thought Harrison fired them because he "saw them as 'enablers' of [Dončić]", while another thought Harrison feared Smith's influence within the organization. One source told MacMahon that team legend Dirk Nowitzki was so alarmed at Smith's termination that he reduced his own involvement with Mavericks basketball operations. Harrison responded that the Mavericks made the NBA Finals after he fired Smith, specifically stating that "You bringing up Casey [Smith] is like almost, it's kind of a joke. "Like last year, Casey wasn't around, and we made it to the Finals. No one brought up Casey last year. So, to bring him up this year doesn't really make sense. He's been away for two years. So it's—I'm not even going to comment on that.".

Dončić's salary amplified the Mavericks' perceived risks. According to The Athletic, the Mavericks did not want to offer Dončić the $345 million supermax contract he was eligible for at the end of the season. The value of the supermax was estimated at roughly $116 million more than any other team's best possible offer. It was reported that Dončić would have accepted a supermax offer from Dallas, although Harrison subsequently questioned this. In addition, provided that Davis waived his $6 million bonus for being traded (which he did), moving Dončić's current salary would get the Mavericks out of the luxury tax. Team governor Patrick Dumont, who had recently bought majority control of the team from longtime owner Mark Cuban (who remained as a minority owner and advisor), rejected suggestions that the Mavericks were categorically unwilling to offer supermax extensions or that they traded Dončić to avoid paying the luxury tax. He called the trade "a risk-allocation decision." Upon being asked "Were you told by team owner Patrick Dumont to trade Luka Dončić to avoid paying him the NBA's super-max contract?" Harrison stated "No. Not at all. Patrick reminds me of the leadership that I had at Nike. A really good leader doesn't tell the people that work for them what to do. It's a collective, well-thought out process to make a big move like that. Then also, unfortunately, I'm super stubborn, so someone telling me to do something doesn't work too well for me." Having earlier successfully convinced Dumont to sideline Cuban from "constant inteference" in basketball operations, Harrison had framed the Dončić trade as a business decision, presenting "what he wanted his boss [Dumont] to know, not necessarily everything that Dumont needed to know, especially as an NBA newcomer". Cuban later stated that he regretted selling the team to the Adelson and Dumont families and has alluded to his strong disagreement with the trade, having previously stated "If I had to choose between my wife and keeping Luka on the Mavs, catch me at my lawyer’s office prepping for a divorce".

=== Negotiations ===
In January 2025, Mavericks then-general manager Nico Harrison reached out to Lakers general manager Rob Pelinka, who he had been friends with since 2003, about a potential Dončić trade. Pelinka initially thought Harrison was joking. On January 7, Pelinka and Harrison met at the Hotel Crescent Court's coffee shop to begin negotiating the trade. According to an unnamed Lakers source, the Mavericks initially asked for rookie Dalton Knecht and multiple first-round picks in addition to Davis, but Pelinka convinced Harrison that Dončić's conditioning issues warranted a smaller return. "To get Dallas out of the luxury tax while still being cap-legal from L.A.'s end," the Lakers and Mavericks paid the Utah Jazz one second-round pick each to take on outgoing Laker Jalen Hood-Schifino's salary. Jazz CEO Danny Ainge was brought into the trade one week before it happened and did not know Dončić was involved until 30 minutes before the news broke.

The Mavericks stated that they did not open trade discussions for Dončić with other teams, which drew significant criticism due to the belief that the Mavericks could have started a bidding war and received more value from the trade. Harrison worried that if Dončić knew he was on the trading block, he could "dictate where [he's] going to go" by threatening to trigger his 2026 opt-out clause if traded to the wrong team. Harrison wanted to negotiate with only teams that could send back a star player in return. ESPN reported that Harrison negotiated with only the Lakers, although The Athletic reported that the Mavericks had informally shopped Dončić to at least one other team. Dallas reportedly also attempted to trade Dončić for Anthony Edwards (Minnesota Timberwolves) and Giannis Antetokounmpo (Milwaukee Bucks). The Mavericks' unwillingness to look at other potential offers drew widespread criticism.

=== The trade ===
At 12:16 a.m. (ET) on February 2, 2025, ESPN's Shams Charania broke the news and revealed most of the pieces in the deal. The Salt Lake Tribune's Andy Larsen later added that the Jazz paid Dallas and Los Angeles nominal amounts of cash.

To Los Angeles Lakers	To Dallas Mavericks	To Utah Jazz
PG Luka Dončić; PF Maxi Kleber; PF Markieff Morris; $55,000 (from Jazz)	C/PF Anthony Davis; SG Max Christie; 2029 1st-round pick (from Lakers); $55,000 (from Jazz)	PG Jalen Hood-Schifino; 2025 2nd-round pick (from Clippers via Lakers); 2025 2nd-round pick (from Mavericks)

== Analysis ==
The trade is widely considered to be one of the most one-sided trades in NBA history, with the Lakers overwhelmingly considered the winners of the trade. Tim MacMahon, who was writing a book on Dončić at the time of the trade, said that he spoke with 50 NBA front office personnel about the trade, and "many [told him] you cannot trade a generational talent [like Dončić] at 25 years old unless the guy puts a gun to your head and wants his way out." CBS Sports' Brad Botkin gave the trade an "A+" grade for the Lakers and an "F" for the Mavericks, stating that he believed the Mavericks were "better positioned to win a championship... but they still get an 'F' because you can't trade Luka Dončić, not unless your hand is forced." ESPN's Kevin Pelton gave the Lakers an "A" and the Mavericks an "F," writing that while Davis was a good player, Dončić was younger and had not yet reached his peak years. SB Nation's Ricky O'Donnell gave the Lakers an "A+" and the Mavericks a "D+." The Mirror stated that the trade was the worst in all of NBA history, with "no close second." Some compared the trade to other historical trades such as the Wayne Gretzky trade from the Edmonton Oilers to the Los Angeles Kings in 1988.

The Mavericks' rationale for the trade was questioned in the press. Commentator and NBA Hall of Famer Reggie Miller called the leaks about Dončić's conditioning a "character assassination," although he clarified that he did not know for certain whether the Mavericks were the leakers. He said that while he "was critical of [Dončić's conditioning] too," Dončić still produced at a high level. The Ringer's Rob Mahoney noted that while Dončić had a reputation for low defensive effort, "Dallas has allowed fewer points when Luka's been on the floor this season, and dominated opponents in those minutes overall." MacMahon said that while Dončić's "conditioning concerns" were a "major flaw," he was nonetheless "the most talented player in [Mavericks] history", even more so than Dirk Nowitzki. He added that even with Dončić, the Mavericks defense had been strong during the end of the 2023–24 regular season and the 2024 playoffs. Ricky O'Donnell said that "if Dončić isn't worth the supermax, no one is."

Some analysts did credit the Mavericks. An unnamed NBA executive told The Athletic that while the Lakers paid an "insanely discounted price" for Dončić, "defensively, [the Mavericks] can be the equal or better than anyone in the league in the short term." FOX Sports' Colin Cowherd said that while the trade did not make "historical sense," Dončić's high salary and perceived injury troubles helped explain the trade. Yahoo Sports' Morten Jensen said the Lakers won the trade but strongly praised Davis, although he counseled that the Mavericks' new Davis–Kyrie Irving core "will have a short window to win a title." Former NBA All-NBA Team member Baron Davis said that the trade "unlocks Kyrie to go and be Kyrie again."

With respect to the Lakers, some pundits noted that the Lakers lacked balance, as they had traded away their only elite defensive big man. At the trade deadline, Pelinka dealt for Charlotte's Mark Williams, but the trade was later rescinded due to a failed physical. Other pundits questioned the fit between Dončić and LeBron James, two ball-dominant scorers. In addition, ESPN's Brian Windhorst noted that the Lakers were taking a risk with the trade, as Dončić had only one and a half guaranteed years left on his contract.

== Reaction ==
=== NBA and sports media ===
I've been covering the NBA for 37 years. Almost nothing that happens—deals, free agent signings, coach hirings/firings—rises to the level of, as the great Ben Bradlee used to call them, "holy s--t" stories. This is a "Holy S--t" trade. (David Aldridge)

The unexpected nature of the trade shocked the NBA community. NBA.com's Steve Aschburner and Vox's Dylan Scott called the trade the most astonishing in NBA history, and Fox Sports even called it the most shocking trade in American sports history. Aschburner said that "even the most click-thirsty, fringe-media blogger would have scoffed at [the idea] a few hours earlier." Laker Hall of Famer Magic Johnson wrote that in his 45 years in the NBA community, "this Luka and A.D. trade is the biggest trade I've seen between two superstars essentially in their prime." According to the Elias Sports Bureau (via ESPN), the trade was "the first time that two reigning All-NBA players have been traded for each other midseason."

The trade was met with great disbelief, as Dončić "was assumed to be untouchable." Magic Johnson said that Dončić, like LeBron James, was one of "the best passers who [has] ever played." Ricky O'Donnell wrote that "you don't trade a player like [Dončić] for anything," and John Hollinger said that "generational 25-year-olds ... aren't moved until their third contract, if they move at all." Shams Charania wondered whether he had been hacked when he received the news, and after breaking the story, emphasized in a follow-up tweet: "Yes, this is real." Several NBA figures reacted in similar disbelief and astonishment when Charania broke the story (with some believing that he was hacked), including SportsCenter anchor Phil Murphy, Indiana Pacers guard Tyrese Haliburton, and NBC Sports' Kurt Helin. Other journalists and players expressed their astonishment, including ESPN's Stephen A. Smith, New York Knicks guard Jalen Brunson, and Knicks forward Josh Hart. Phoenix Suns guard Devin Booker initially thought the reports were about Minnesota Timberwolves center Luka Garza and not Dončić. NBA Commissioner Adam Silver declined to comment on the merits of the trade, saying that the Mavericks "have a philosophical belief on what's necessary to ultimately be champions, and I'm not in a position to second guess that."

Several NBA executives expressed shock at the fact that the Mavericks negotiated exclusively with the Lakers, and argued that Dallas could have obtained a much larger return for Dončić in an open auction. Two anonymous executives said that "it probably would have been the biggest haul in NBA history" and that "every team in the league would have offered everything they could." However, one executive echoed the Mavericks' point that if Dončić had known about the trade, he might have tried to "dictate terms" (that is, force himself to a specific team). Dylan Scott said that although Davis was an "excellent player," the overall package the Mavericks received for Dončić was "not much compared to previous blockbuster NBA trades." Zach Harper acknowledged Davis's accolades but cautioned that "maybe four or five players in the NBA" would constitute fair value for Dončić. He also noted that the Rudy Gobert and Mikal Bridges trades included multiple first-round draft picks, despite being for players considered significantly less valuable than Dončić.

When The Athletic polled NBA players about the trade at the end of the regular season, respondents generally criticized the Mavericks' decision-making and expressed surprise about the trade. A minority of players suggested that the Mavericks might be a better team in the short run, although some of them still questioned the overall wisdom of the trade. Several players also took the trade as a reminder that "nobody is safe" and that "anybody can get traded, no matter what they say."

The Mavericks also received criticism as their roster was built around players that suited Dončić and had questionable fit with Davis, although the Mavericks did move Davis to his preferred position of power forward.

=== Dallas ===
Although the Dallas home crowd cheered for Davis during his first game as a Maverick, Mavericks fans widely panned the trade, especially given that the Mavericks had just made the NBA Finals the previous season with a team built around Dončić. At the end of the regular season, ESPN's Tim MacMahon told Mavericks general manager Nico Harrison that "the overwhelming majority" of Mavericks fans wanted to fire him. A group of fans gathered outside of the American Airlines Center to protest the trade shortly after the news broke, with some calling for Harrison to be fired, and others bringing a coffin for Dončić to stage a mock funeral. Public response to the trade included death threats directed at Harrison, as well as billboards and murals criticizing Harrison and the Adelson family. Through the following months, "Fire Nico" chants became regular occurrences at events in the Dallas area, including unrelated sports games, a St. Patrick's Day parade, and a Medieval Times dinner show. "Fire Nico" fan-made merchandise and social media remarks were also widely circulated. The Mavericks organization subsequently ejected from the arena those chanting, holding up signs, and wearing "Fire Nico" shirts, leading to increased protest.

Texas Governor Greg Abbott also expressed surprise about the trade. He had been preparing for the following day's State of the State address when he learned of the trade, after which "all I was doing was focusing on Luka".

Several fans cancelled their season tickets; the Mavericks stated that they had refunded at least one such fan. After the end of the 2025 regular season, the team disclosed that the team's season ticket renewal rate was between 75% and 80%. The Mavericks lost millions of dollars in revenue as a result of the fallout of the trade.

With respect to Mavericks players, Klay Thompson said it was a "joy to play with [Dončić] in those 22 games," but added that the team would welcome Anthony Davis "with open arms." Kyrie Irving said that "It's still a grieving process right now. I miss my hermano." However, he added that he was glad to finally be teammates with his good friend Davis. Several months after the trade, P. J. Washington asked fans to stop chanting "fire Nico" at games, saying that "we need the fans to support us no matter who's on the floor".

Former Mavericks majority owner Mark Cuban, who had surrendered control over basketball operations after the 2023–24 season, publicly denied being involved with the trade. After a delay of several weeks, he added that he would not have traded Dončić, comparing the trade to his decision to allow Mavericks star Steve Nash to join the Phoenix Suns in 2004. He said that the Adelson family "didn't know the first thing about running a team" and claimed that the NBA had prevented him from conditioning the sale on his continued control over basketball decisions. Dirk Nowitzki said that while he "will always be a Mavs fan ... this trade really hurt," and "it will take a while before everyone processes it and moves on." He later stated, after attending Dončić's first game as Laker, that "I think I was as shocked and surprised as anyone was. ... I really couldn't believe it. Of course I felt a little disappointed and sad for him, you know. I think he obviously didn't see this coming. So he invited me to come out to his first game in L.A., and I felt like I had to support him. I think he was—I mean it was reported that—he was pretty down and disappointed in how it went down, and so I wanted to be there for him, I wanted to be there for his family. ... I'm sure he wanted to finish his career like I did."

Former Mavericks head coach Don Nelson criticized the trade, stating that it was a "tremendous mistake". He also wore Dončić's Nike shoes to Game 2 of the 2025 NBA finals as a symbol of protest against the trade and support for Dončić'.

Dallas head coach Jason Kidd later stated that "I didn't cry. I was more or less trying to figure out how we're going to make this thing work. This is a big trade. I didn't call anybody. I put my phone down and looked at the ceiling and started trying to brainstorm of how this is going to go down. I did not call anybody once this hit. My job as the coach is to make sure that we all are pushing in the right direction." Later, he stated that "I was told by my boss Nico that we were going to make a change. This is in a hotel in Cleveland. He said the news was going to hit in an hour and that's when it went down. So, when he told me, I went back to my room to start figuring out how we're going to use AD and Christie because of this change".

=== Los Angeles ===
Lakers fans reacted to the trade positively. One fan noted that he was "sad to see AD go" but was "happy for Luka. He's a good player." Another fan added "we got a good deal. Thank you, Texas." The Los Angeles Rams and the Los Angeles Kings' Anže Kopitar (a fellow Slovene) welcomed Dončić to Los Angeles. Harrison attended the February 25 game between the Lakers and Mavericks in Los Angeles, and throughout the game, Lakers fans at the arena erupted with what Sports Illustrated and other news outlets described as "trolling" chants of "Thank you, Nico!".

LeBron James thought that the trade was a "hoax" at first, adding that it "still pretty much didn't seem real." He said that while "my emotions were all over the place" at first, Dončić "has been my favorite player in the NBA for a while now." Lakers coach JJ Redick, who played with Dončić in 2021, stated that the experience the two had given them both a "head start." Redick, who has been described as a "fan and historian" of the NBA, described the trade as a "once in a lifetime opportunity."

=== Dončić and Davis ===
Dončić was upset by the trade. When he got the news, he threw his cell phone across the room, cracking the glass. At his first press conference after joining the Lakers, he said that he had expected to "spend my whole career" in Dallas and that "loyalty is a big word for me", echoing sentiment that the loyalty expected of players was greater than that expected of teams. As of the end of the regular season, Dončić had not spoken to Harrison since the trade; Harrison commented that although he reached out after the trade, Dončić "probably doesn't want to talk to me." Former Maverick Chandler Parsons claimed that Dončić cried after learning about the trade. Dončić later stated that "It wasn't easy arriving as a new guy in a new city, but the first thing that impressed me was the welcome from the fans" and "The Lakers are an amazing organization. I'm looking forward to meeting Mark and excited about the future. I am also grateful to Jeanie and the Buss family for welcoming me to LA, and I'm happy that Jeanie will continue to be involved. I look forward to working with both of them to win championships!". He recruited Marcus Smart and Deandre Ayton to the Lakers and on August 2, 2025, he signed a three-year, $165 million extension with a player option in the final year on. LeBron James, who did not attend the press conference announcing the contract extension, later congratulated Dončić.

I just signed my extension with the Lakers. Excited to keep working to bring championships to LA and make Laker Nation proud. Grateful to the Lakers, my teammates and all the fans who've shown so much love since day one. This is just the beginning.

— Dončić's Twitter post after signing the contract extension

Davis was more accepting of the trade. In his introductory press conference with the Mavericks, he said that he understood that Mavericks fans were upset, because "I get who Luka was to this franchise, to the city ... just how I know what I meant to the city of L.A." He expressed his appreciation for Harrison's faith in him, saying that "it's my job to ... give the fans hope and reassurance on why Nico brought me here." He waived his $6 million bonus for being traded, stating that he wanted to help the Mavericks get "continuously better."

== Aftermath ==
=== Early games ===
Both players were injured at the time of the trade. Dončić had not played since straining his calf during the Mavericks' Christmas Day game. Davis had missed the previous two games with an abdominal strain.

Davis made his Mavericks debut on February 8, in a home game win against the Houston Rockets. In the first half, he recorded 24 points, 13 rebounds, 5 assists, and 3 blocks. However, he suffered a left adductor strain in the third quarter and missed most of February and March. He subsequently rehabbed with the Mavericks' G-league affiliate, the Texas Legends. In addition, the Mavericks' remaining star player, Kyrie Irving, tore his ACL on March 3, prematurely ending his season. Several other Mavericks sustained lengthy injuries after the trade. The Mavericks' mismanagement and training staff decisions were also criticized as a cause of the disproportionate load management in the wake of the absence of Dončić on the court, leading to the season-ending injuries of Mavericks starters Kyrie Irving, Dereck Lively II, and Daniel Gafford.

Dončić made his Lakers debut on February 10, in a home game win against the Utah Jazz. He played 23 minutes, scoring 14 points and collecting four assists. Dirk Nowitzki attended the game at Dončić's invitation, explaining that he felt bad for Dončić.

The Lakers won the two remaining Lakers-Mavericks regular season games. In a 107–99 win in Los Angeles on February 25, Dončić recorded a triple-double; Davis sat out the game with an injury. In a 112–97 win in Dallas on April 8, Dončić matched his season-high with 45 points, while Davis had 13 points and 11 rebounds. The Mavericks' loss guaranteed the team a losing season. Both teams commemorated their departed stars by playing tribute videos during their respective home games. In addition, the Mavericks gave every fan in their arena a shirt saying "Thank you for everything" in Slovenian. Fans cheered every time Dončić touched the ball and chanted "Fire Nico".

While the Lakers clinched the third seed in their conference, Dallas' season came to an end with a loss to the Memphis Grizzlies in the NBA Play-In Tournament, becoming the first reigning Finals participant since the 2019–20 Golden State Warriors to subsequently miss the playoffs. Davis scored 40 points in the 120–106 loss, while also re-aggravating a prior leg injury. In nine games played with the Mavericks in the 2024–25 season, he averaged 23.9 minutes, 20 points, 10.1 rebounds, 4.4 assists and 2.2 blocks per contest. The Lakers' season ended in a first-round loss to the Minnesota Timberwolves in five games. Dončić's defense in the series came under fire after his performances in the series, as did the Lakers' lack of size and rebounding, especially at the center position, that they would have had if Davis were still on their roster.

The Mavericks fired head athletic trainer Dionne Calhoun and athletic performance director Keith Belton, among others, on May 8, likely in response to their handling of Dončić.

=== Mavericks media response ===
In the weeks and months following the trade, various Mavericks leadership figures publicly discussed the trade on several occasions. Nico Harrison gave a press conference immediately after the trade, where he outlined his reasoning. A week after the trade, Dumont gave an interview to the Dallas Morning News to support Harrison and provide further context. He said that he wanted players who "worked really hard, every day" and that "if you want to take a vacation, don't do it with us." When asked about whether Dončić lacked those winning qualities, Dumont avoided the question, saying that "there's a lot of things that come into play," and "we're focused on [team culture]." Harrison later stated that "I think the biggest thing is if you don't value AD as an All-NBA player and All-Defensive player, then you're not going to like the trade. We targeted AD, but if you don't like him then there is nothing else that we could get that would make you excited about the trade." He also stated that "I did know that Luka was important to the fan base. I didn't quite know it to what level, but really, the way we looked at it, is if you're putting a team on the floor that's Kyrie, Klay, P.J., Anthony Davis and Lively, we feel that's a championship caliber team, and we would've been winning at a high level and that would have quieted some of the outrage."

Harrison did not formally speak to the press for the rest of the regular season. However, various leaks to the press questioned Dončić's conditioning. Shortly after the trade, Dončić said that he would take the "high road" with respect to criticism of his conditioning. However, his father Saša attributed many of the leaks to the Mavericks and criticized them for attacking his son. In addition, after the end of the regular season, Dončić likewise suggested that the Mavericks had leaked the negative stories, calling them "painful". One of Dončić's friends opined that the Mavericks had portrayed Dončić as "a fat, drunk pig". Harrison denied being the source of those leaks, saying that "I feel the same way he does. I've actually never spoken ill of Luka, and I'm just ready to move on with this team that we have".

On February 21, the Mavericks posted a video to their social media platforms (since removed), as a hype video featuring Mavericks highlights. Dončić was notably censored in the video, with a Mavericks logo edited over him in highlight clips. The video was met with backlash on social media and news platforms by Mavericks fans and commentators.

Shortly before the Mavericks took the court for the 2025 NBA play-in tournament, Harrison and team CEO Rick Welts invited reporters to a roundtable discussion. Harrison stuck to his original reasoning that Davis's defense could help the team win a title, lamented that his "championship-caliber team" never played a full game together, praised the team for not quitting on the season despite the injuries, and pointed out that some fans had incorrectly doubted his trades for Kyrie Irving, Daniel Gafford, and P. J. Washington. When asked why the Mavericks did not obtain a bigger package for Dončić (e.g. more picks or Austin Reaves), he defended Davis and said that "we got what we wanted". He admitted that Dončić was still effective on offense even "when maybe he's not in the best conditioning", but questioned whether Dončić would have actually signed a supermax extension with Dallas if he had not been traded. Welts acknowledged Mavericks fans' criticism of the trade and asked the fanbase to trust in the team's plan, citing three cases where teams traded away fan-favorite players but did well in the long term (Wilkens for Beard, Marbury for cap space, and Ellis for Bogut). Dončić responded that "It's just sad the way he's talking right now ... I never say anything bad about him, and I just want to move on."

After the Mavericks were eliminated from the play-in tournament, Harrison publicly admitted that he had underestimated Dončić's popularity with Mavericks fans. However, he maintained that his job was "to make decisions" and "some of them are going to be unpopular." He said that he expected the Mavericks to contend for a championship in the 2025–26 season.

The team specifically pushed back against a conspiracy theory alleging that the Mavericks were intentionally alienating their fanbase so that they could better justify moving the team to Las Vegas, where the Adelson family does much of its business. Dumont and NBA Commissioner Adam Silver both said that the Mavericks intended to stay in the Dallas area. The Adelson-Dumont family has purchased land in nearby Irving, and Mavericks sources said that as long as Texas legalizes casino gambling, the family plans to build an entertainment district anchored by a casino and a new Mavericks arena.

=== NBA draft lottery ===
As a result of not qualifying for the 2025 NBA playoffs, the Mavericks entered the lottery with just 1.8% odds of obtaining the first overall pick. Against these odds, the Dallas Mavericks received the first overall pick in the 2025 NBA draft, which prompted great surprise and reignited accusations of the NBA draft lottery being rigged, with Harrison stating "Fortune favours the bold". It was widely expected that they would take Duke's All-American forward Cooper Flagg with the pick, with Jason Kidd stating that the team was "studying the young man that used to play at Duke". The Mavericks did eventually select Flagg with high expectations, amidst continued chants of "Fire Nico". In regards to the drafting of Flagg and the Mavericks fanbase's potential reaction, "I think it will help," Harrison said, "Most importantly, I think, we're in win-now mode, and we have a really good team, and Cooper adds to that, so I think the fans finally start to see the vision." However, it is generally considered that the drafting of Flagg does not excuse the trade, despite Flagg being considered a generational prospect.

=== Dončić physical transformation and offseason ===
The following offseason, Dončić underwent a significant physical transformation, slimming down significantly and improving his vertical, although his supposed vertical of 42 inches received scrutiny and accusation of AI slop. His transformation was featured on the cover of Men's Health magazine. This was likely related to the Mavericks' motivations for trading him. He also changed his diet significantly and underwent fasting and spent an entire month on conditioning without playing basketball. He told Men's Health that he wanted to start training as soon as Los Angeles was eliminated in the first round of the playoffs. Dončić also competed at EuroBasket 2025 in the offseason. However, Dončić returned to the Lakers heavier than his recorded weight the previous season.

Dončić told Men's Health "Every summer I try my best to work on different things. Obviously, I'm very competitive. This summer was just a little bit different, you know. It kind of motivated me to be even better. Obviously, be the best that I can be, take care of myself. This year, with my team, I think we did a huge step. But this is just the start, you know. I need to keep going. Can't stop."

While attending a New York Yankees game, he was asked if he would send a copy of the Men's Health feature to the Mavericks, Dončić stated that "I think they've already seen it, so we don't have to worry about that." "Honestly, I try not to read much into it," Dončić said on Today, "I still think I was a pretty good basketball player back then, no matter what people say. But I think it was the next step of my career, and in the end, I'm still 26 and I have a long way to go." His manager, Lara Beth Seager, later stated "He's moved on, he's only looking forward. And he's here. He wants to get the best players here. He wants to win, and he knows it starts with him. And he's here. He wants to get the best players here".

=== 2025–26 season, firing of Harrison, Davis traded to Washington ===
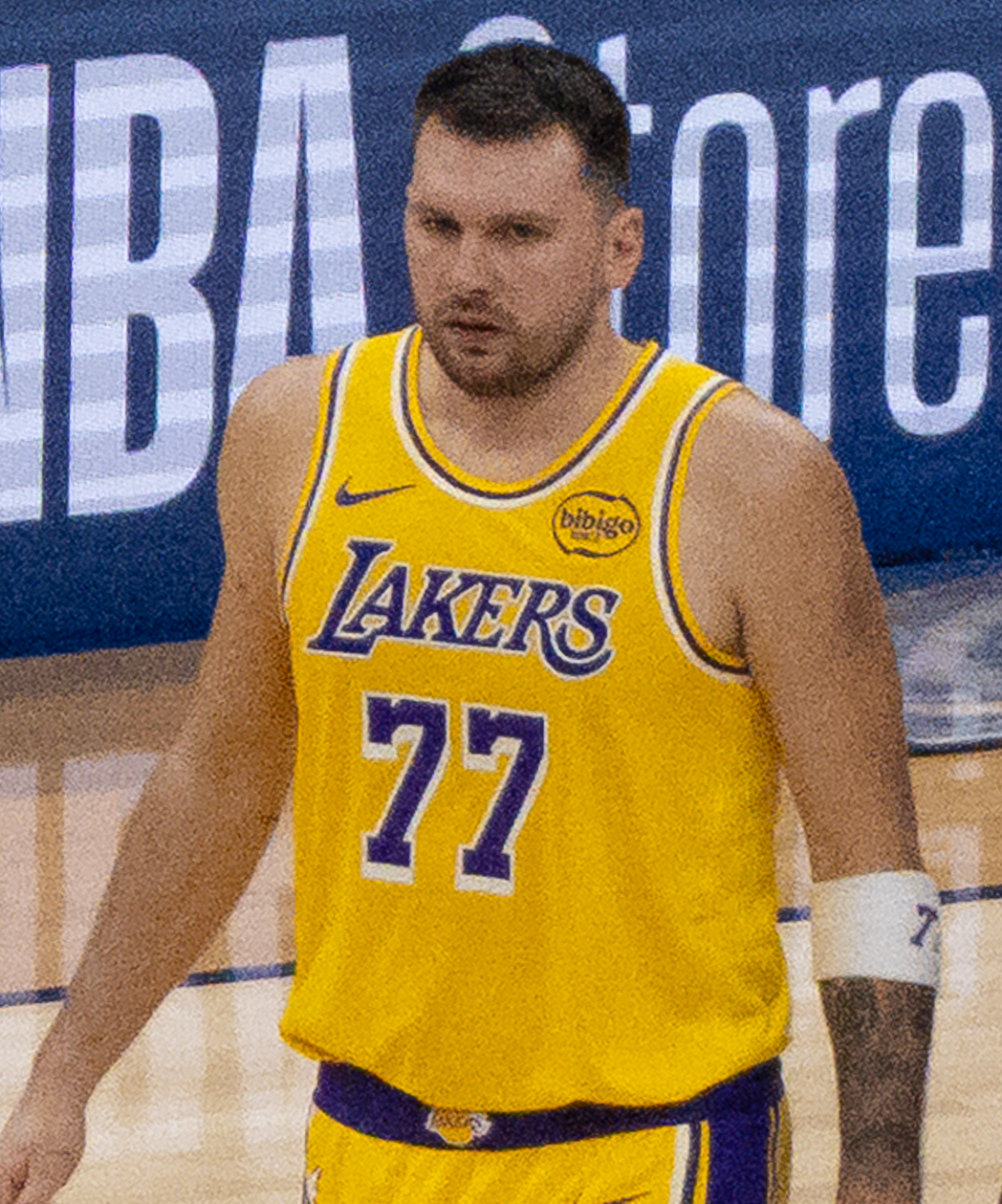
Dončić with the Los Angeles Lakers in 2026

On November 11, 2025, reports surfaced that Harrison was expected to be fired from his position as general manager during a meeting with Mavericks' team governor Patrick Dumont. At the time of Harrison's firing, the Mavericks' record was 3–8, with the team second to last place in Western Conference standings. Furthermore, upon Harrison's firing, Davis had missed the previous six games due to calf soreness, with the Mavericks losing five. Meanwhile, Dončić was averaging 37.1 points, 9.4 rebounds, and 9.1 assists per game for the Lakers, having led the team to an 8–3 record and fourth place in the West. The next day, Michael Finley and Matt Riccardi were appointed as co-interim general managers for the Dallas Mavericks. Golden State Warriors power forward Draymond Green commented that due to the injury to Kyrie Irving, Harrison's vision was not given a chance.

On February 5, 2026, just over one year after the trade, Davis was traded to the Washington Wizards as part of a three-team deal also involving the Charlotte Hornets. Davis had appeared in just 29 games with the Mavericks due to various injuries, as well as only 1 game with co-star Kyrie Irving.

While the Mavericks failed to qualify for the postseason, the Lakers secured the fourth seed in the Western Conference entering the 2026 NBA playoffs. Dončić, having suffered a hamstring injury on April 2, 2026, did not play in the postseason, while the Lakers lost in the second round.

=== 2026 offseason ===
During the 2026 offseason, the Lakers further committed to building around Dončić by trading for Walker Kessler and adding more defensive and complementary depth to the team, similar to that which Dončić had in Dallas. Dončić broke several NBA and Lakers records to start the 2026–27 NBA season.

== See also ==
- Brock for Broglio
- Curse of the Bambino
- Deshaun Watson trade
- Eric Lindros trade
- Herschel Walker trade
- Jerome Bettis trade
- Ricky Williams trade
- White Flag Trade
