= Eric Lindros trade =

Hockey player trade

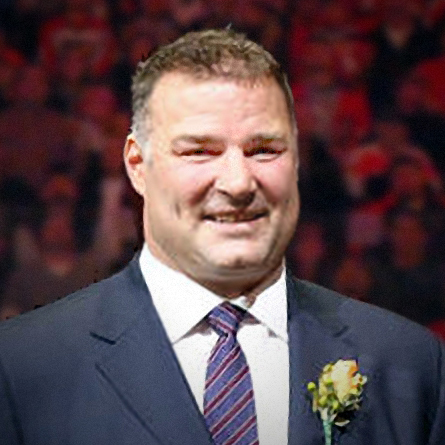
Eric Lindros in 2014

The Eric Lindros trade was the culmination of a holdout by Eric Lindros from the Quebec Nordiques of the National Hockey League (NHL). The Nordiques selected Lindros in the 1991 NHL entry draft with the first overall selection, but Lindros refused to play for them. After holding out from Quebec for a year, the Nordiques agreed to two trades involving Lindros at the onset of the 1992 NHL entry draft, one with the Philadelphia Flyers and one with the New York Rangers. An arbitrator ruled in favour of the Flyers on June 30, 1992.

Lindros played for the Flyers until 2001. He was awarded the Hart Memorial Trophy as the league's Most Valuable Player in 1995, while tying for the scoring lead. The Lindros-led Flyers never won the Stanley Cup, reaching only the 1997 Stanley Cup Final where they were defeated. The Nordiques, who moved to Denver, Colorado, and became the Colorado Avalanche in the summer of 1995, won the Stanley Cup in 1996 and 2001 with contributions from players acquired in the Lindros trade, including Peter Forsberg and Mike Ricci. The Rangers also won the 1994 Stanley Cup with some of the players they had originally offered in exchange for Lindros, including Alexei Kovalev and Mike Richter.

== Background ==
As an amateur, Lindros played junior ice hockey for the Oshawa Generals of the Ontario Hockey League (OHL). He had been selected by the Sault Ste. Marie Greyhounds of the OHL, but he refused to play for them, and was traded to Oshawa. This led to a rule change that allowed players to play closer to their home. He led the Generals to the Memorial Cup in 1990, and won the Red Tilson Trophy, given to the Most Outstanding Player in the OHL, in 1991. That year, he was named the Canadian Hockey League (CHL) Player of the Year and won the CHL Top Draft Prospect Award. Lindros was considered the best prospect available in the 1991 NHL entry draft, and received the nickname "The Next One", as a possible successor to Wayne Gretzky, known as "The Great One".

The Quebec Nordiques, who won 28 games combined in the 1989–90 and 1990–91 seasons, held the first overall selection in the draft for the third consecutive year. They had selected Mats Sundin and Owen Nolan in the previous two drafts, and also had rising star Joe Sakic. Lindros, however, stated before the draft that he would hold out and refuse to play for Quebec if they drafted him. It was widely speculated that Lindros wanted to play in an English-speaking area that would present him with more endorsement opportunities, although Lindros himself later insisted that he was motivated solely by antipathy toward Nordiques owner Marcel Aubut.

In a 2016 interview, Lindros revealed that this decision was based entirely on the behavior of Aubut, explaining, "The decision to not play for Quebec was based solely on the owner. It had nothing to do with language, culture, [or] city. Keep in mind, my wife is French [from Quebec]. I was not going to play for that individual – period." In one particular meeting between Aubut and the Lindros family, Aubut reportedly made a rude and sexually charged comment in French about Lindros' mother Bonnie, not knowing that Bonnie was bilingual. More than two decades later, Aubut was forced to resign his positions as President of the Canadian Olympic Committee and Chair of the Canadian Olympic Foundation after multiple credible allegations of sexual harassment were made against him, with a retired Quebec Superior Court justice brought in to investigate.

The Nordiques selected Lindros despite the warning. He asked for a $3 million annual salary with the hopes that Quebec would trade him. Rather than sign with Quebec, he returned to Oshawa for the 1991–92 season and represented Canada in the 1992 Winter Olympics. Meanwhile, Lindros reportedly rejected a 10-year contract offer worth at least $50 million from the Nordiques in March 1992, although Quebec denied making the offer. Gord Kirke acted as legal counsel to Lindros during this time, and led contract negotiations. Kirke later stated about the incident that, "There were all kinds of allegations of Eric being anti-Quebec. But I knew it to be absolutely false. It had more to do with the management of the team".

By June 1992, the Nordiques announced that they were moving towards trading Lindros, and were engaged in trade discussions with the Toronto Maple Leafs, Calgary Flames, New Jersey Devils, Philadelphia Flyers, and Detroit Red Wings. The Red Wings were reported to be willing to trade Steve Yzerman, Steve Chiasson, and numerous draft picks to the Nordiques for Lindros. Yzerman indicated that he would also hold out from the Nordiques, should Detroit trade him to Quebec.

== Competing trades ==
On June 20, 1992, at the onset of the 1992 NHL entry draft, the Nordiques entered into a verbal agreement on a trade involving Lindros with the Flyers. The trade was contingent on Lindros agreeing to play in Philadelphia. The Nordiques permitted Russ Farwell, the general manager of the Flyers, to call Lindros to discuss whether Lindros would be willing to play for the Flyers, and he received assurance that Lindros considered Philadelphia to be acceptable. Within 80 minutes of agreeing to a trade with Farwell, Marcel Aubut, the president of the Nordiques, had second thoughts about the trade with Philadelphia and verbally agreed to trade Lindros to the New York Rangers. The Flyers offer was reported to include Mike Ricci, Rod Brind'Amour, Mark Recchi, Steve Duchesne, Ron Hextall, Dominic Roussel, multiple first-round draft picks, and $15 million, while the Rangers had reportedly agreed to trade Sergei Nemchinov, Tony Amonte, Alexei Kovalev, James Patrick, and either John Vanbiesbrouck or Mike Richter, as well as multiple first-round draft picks, and $20 million.

The Flyers claimed that the Nordiques had reneged on their agreement, and filed a complaint with the NHL. The NHL appointed Larry Bertuzzi, a lawyer from Toronto, as the arbitrator of the conflict. Bertuzzi held a five-day hearing after the 1992 draft, in which he reviewed over 400 pages of handwritten notes and called 11 witnesses, including Lindros.

On June 30, Bertuzzi announced that he had determined that Quebec's agreement with the Flyers was enforceable. He considered Farwell's phone call with Lindros to be "critical" in making his decision. Bertuzzi also found the Rangers to be innocent of any wrongdoing. The finalized trade had the Nordiques acquire Hextall, Duchesne, Ricci, Kerry Huffman, Peter Forsberg, a first-round pick in the 1993 NHL entry draft, $15 million, and future considerations. As the agreed-upon trade included the Flyers sending a 1992 draft pick to Quebec which Philadelphia instead kept because the trade was not yet finalized, Bertuzzi helped the teams agree that the Flyers would send Chris Simon and a pick in the 1994 NHL entry draft to Quebec to compensate for the 1992 draft pick that the Flyers kept and used to select Ryan Sittler. The Nordiques selected Jocelyn Thibault with the 1993 draft pick (10th overall pick), while they swapped 1994 first-round picks with Toronto Maple Leafs as part of a larger 6-player trade, with Quebec drafting Jeff Kealty 22nd overall with the pick from Toronto, while Toronto traded the original Philadelphia pick to the Washington Capitals, who selected Nolan Baumgartner 10th overall in 1994.

The Eric Lindros trade		Voided New York Rangers offer
To Quebec Nordiques	To Philadelphia Flyers	Voided New York Rangers offer
Steve Duchesne; Peter Forsberg; Ron Hextall; Kerry Huffman; Mike Ricci; Chris Simon; Philadelphia's 1st round pick in 1993; Philadelphia's 1st round pick in 1994; $15 million	Eric Lindros	Tony Amonte; Alexei Kovalev; Sergei Nemchinov; James Patrick; Either Mike Richter or John Vanbiesbrouck; Undisclosed multiple first-round draft picks; $20 million

== Aftermath ==
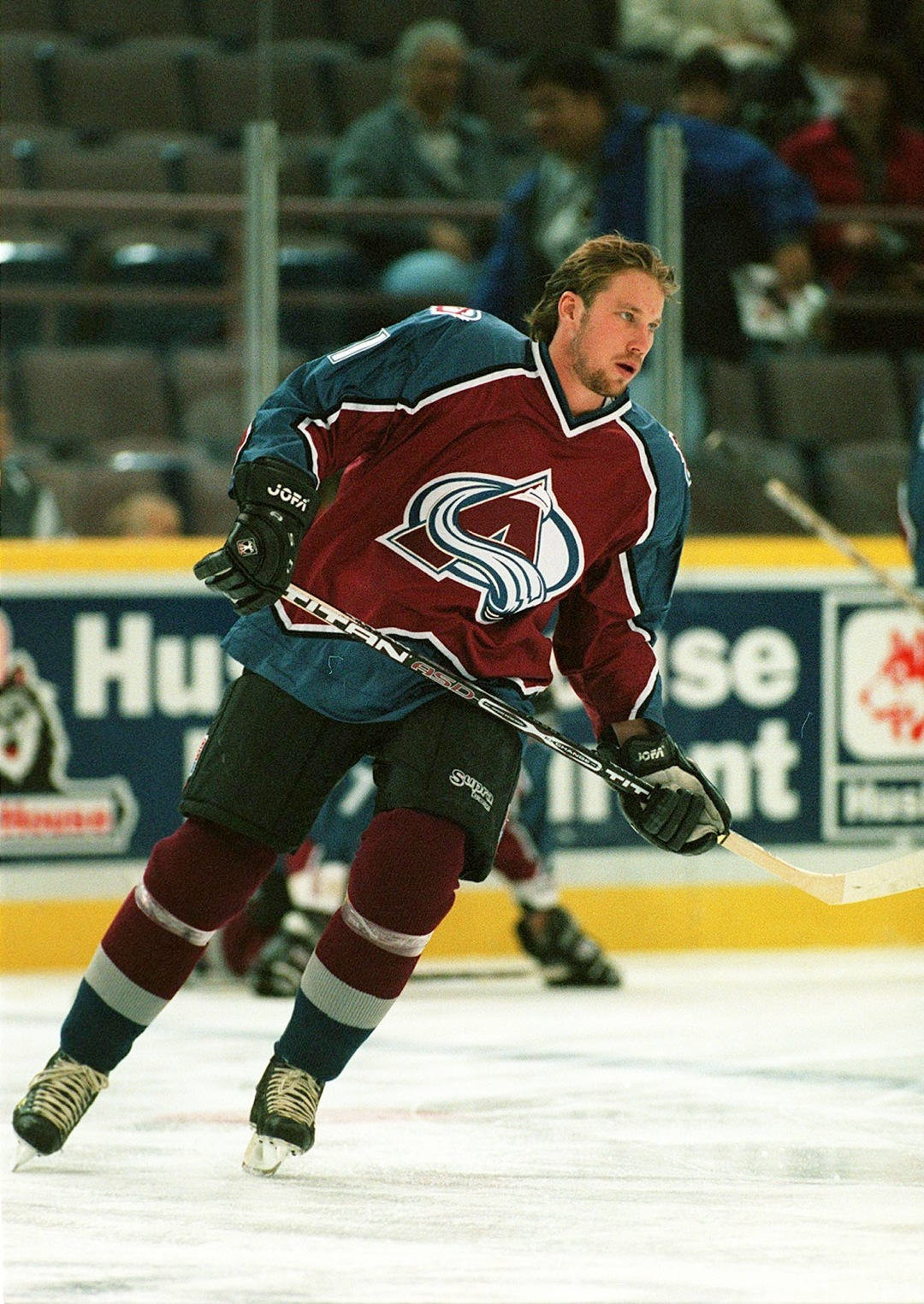
Peter Forsberg with the Colorado Avalanche

Gil Stein, president of the NHL, indicated that the league would not take disciplinary action against Aubut, and the Rangers did not challenge the arbitrator's decision. Stein further stated that as of August 1, all trades needed to be confirmed with the league office by all involved parties before they would be considered consummated.

Hextall and Ricci initially did not want to report to Quebec, but relented. The Nordiques reached the playoffs in the 1992–93 season, their first postseason appearance since 1987. In 1995, the Nordiques moved to Denver, Colorado, and became the Colorado Avalanche. The Avalanche won the 1996 Stanley Cup Final with Forsberg and Ricci playing key roles for the team. Thibault was traded to the Montreal Canadiens for Patrick Roy, who was their starting goaltender as Stanley Cup champions, while Hextall was traded to the New York Islanders in a trade that netted Adam Deadmarsh.

The Avalanche also won the 2001 Stanley Cup Final with Forsberg and Roy playing key roles, as well as Alex Tanguay, who had been drafted with a pick acquired in exchange for Ricci from the San Jose Sharks. Deadmarsh was traded to the Los Angeles Kings on February 21, 2001, as part of multi-player deal for Colorado to upgrade their team with Rob Blake and Steve Reinprecht prior to the playoffs.

Meanwhile, the Rangers won the 1994 Stanley Cup Final anyway without Lindros. Among the players that the Rangers had originally offered in 1992 for Lindros, Kovalev and Richter played key roles in their 1994 Cup run.

Lindros' arrival in Philadelphia helped the team secure funding for their new arena, the CoreStates Center, and a lucrative television contract with Comcast SportsNet Philadelphia. Lindros signed a five-year contract with the Flyers worth an estimated $24 million. As a rookie, he earned $2 million, while Gretzky, with the largest NHL contract, earned $3 million. Lindros did not accompany the Flyers to Quebec for an exhibition game prior to the 1992–93 season due to concern about the reception he would receive. Playing as a centre, Lindros formed a forward line with wingers Recchi and Brent Fedyk in 1992, called the "Crazy Eights". Although Lindros did put up strong numbers in the 1992-93 and 1993-94 seasons, the Flyers missed the playoffs in both seasons. After the Flyers traded Recchi to Montreal to acquire John LeClair for the lockout-shortened 1994-95 season, Lindros, LeClair, and Mikael Renberg played together as the "Legion of Doom", with Lindros winning the Hart Memorial Trophy as league MVP and also tied for the scoring lead with Jaromír Jágr. The Flyers did not win a Stanley Cup with Lindros; they reached the 1997 Stanley Cup Final where they lost in a four-game sweep to the Detroit Red Wings.

Bobby Clarke, who succeeded Farwell as the general manager of the Flyers, feuded with Lindros and his parents in the late 1990s. Lindros sat out the entire 2000–01 NHL season after rejecting a one-year, $8.5 million offer as he demanded a trade from the Flyers. The Flyers traded him to the Rangers in 2001. After Lindros retired from the NHL, the Flyers inducted him into their team Hall of Fame in 2014.

=== List of Quebec/Colorado's subsequent transactions ===
Player/Pick acquired by Quebec	Quebec/Colorado's subsequent transactions (partial list)
Duchesne	Duchesne was traded to the St. Louis Blues in 1994 as part of a deal to acquire Ron Sutter; Sutter was traded to the New York Islanders in 1994 as part of a deal to acquire Uwe Krupp and the Islanders 1st round pick in 1994; Krupp helped Colorado win the 1996 Stanley Cup; The Islanders 1st round pick (12th overall in 1994) was used to select Wade Belak; Belak in 1996 was still playing for Colorado's minor league affiliate, the Cornwall Aces; Belak was traded to the Calgary Flames in 1999 as part of a deal to acquire Chris Dingman; Dingman helped Colorado win the 2001 Stanley Cup
Forsberg	N/A: Forsberg stayed on the team when Colorado won both 1996 and 2001 Stanley Cups
Hextall	Hextall was traded to the New York Islanders in 1993 as part of a deal to acquire the Islanders' 1st round pick in 1993; The Islanders' 1st round pick (14th overall in 1993) was then used to select Adam Deadmarsh; Deadmarsh helped Colorado win the 1996 Stanley Cup; Deadmarsh was traded to the Los Angeles Kings in 2001 as part of a deal to acquire Rob Blake and Steven Reinprecht; Both Blake and Reinprecht helped Colorado win the 2001 Stanley Cup
Huffman	N/A: Huffman signed with the Ottawa Senators during the 1993–94 season under a deal that never contributed to Colorado's Stanley Cups
Ricci	Ricci helped Colorado win the 1996 Stanley Cup; Ricci was traded to the San Jose Sharks in 1997 as part of a deal to acquire the Sharks' 1st round pick in 1998; The Sharks' 1st round pick (12th overall in 1998) was then used to select Alex Tanguay; Tanguay helped Colorado win the 2001 Stanley Cup
Simon	Simon helped Colorado win the 1996 Stanley Cup; Simon was traded to the Washington Capitals during the 1996 off-season as part of a deal to acquire Keith Jones; Jones was traded to Philadelphia in 1998 for Shjon Podein; Podein helped Colorado win the 2001 Stanley Cup
Philadelphia's 1st round pick in 1993	The pick (10th overall in 1993) was used to select Jocelyn Thibault; Thibault was traded to the Montreal Canadiens in 1995 as part of a deal to acquire Mike Keane and Patrick Roy; Keane helped Colorado win the 1996 Stanley Cup; Roy helped Colorado win both 1996 and 2001 Stanley Cups
Philadelphia's 1st round pick in 1994	The pick was traded to the Toronto Maple Leafs in 1994 as part of a deal to acquire Wendel Clark, Sylvain Lefebvre, and Landon Wilson; Lefebvre helped Colorado win the 1996 Stanley Cup; Clark was traded to the New York Islanders in 1995 as part of a deal to acquire Claude Lemieux; Lemieux helped Colorado win the 1996 Stanley Cup; Lemieux was traded to the New Jersey Devils in 1999 as part of a deal to acquire Brian Rolston; Rolston was traded to the Boston Bruins in 2000 as part of a deal to acquire Ray Bourque; Bourque helped Colorado win the 2001 Stanley Cup; Wilson only played 7 games during the 1995–96 season, not enough to be engraved on the Stanley Cup; Wilson traded to the Boston Bruins in 1997 as part of a deal to acquire Boston's 1st round pick in 1998; Boston's 1st round pick (19th overall in 1998) was used to select Robyn Regehr; Regehr was traded to Calgary as part of the above deal to acquire Dingman

=== Players on the NY Rangers's voided offer that stayed for their 1994 championship run ===
- Alexei Kovalev
- Sergei Nemchinov
- Mike Richter

=== End result at the end of the 2000–01 season ===
Colorado Avalanche	Philadelphia Flyers	New York Rangers
Two Stanley Cups (1996 and 2001); Rob Blake; Ray Bourque; Chris Dingman; Peter Forsberg; Shjon Podein; Steven Reinprecht; Patrick Roy; Alex Tanguay	Zero Stanley Cups; 1997 Stanley Cup Final appearance; Eric Lindros sat out during the 2000–01 season	One Stanley Cup (1994); Mike Richter

== See also ==
- Flyers–Rangers rivalry
- Herschel Walker trade
- Brock for Broglio
- White Flag Trade
- Ricky Williams trade
- Deshaun Watson trade
- Luka Dončić–Anthony Davis trade
- List of largest National Football League trades
- Misogyny in ice hockey
