= Herschel Walker trade =

1989 NFL player trade

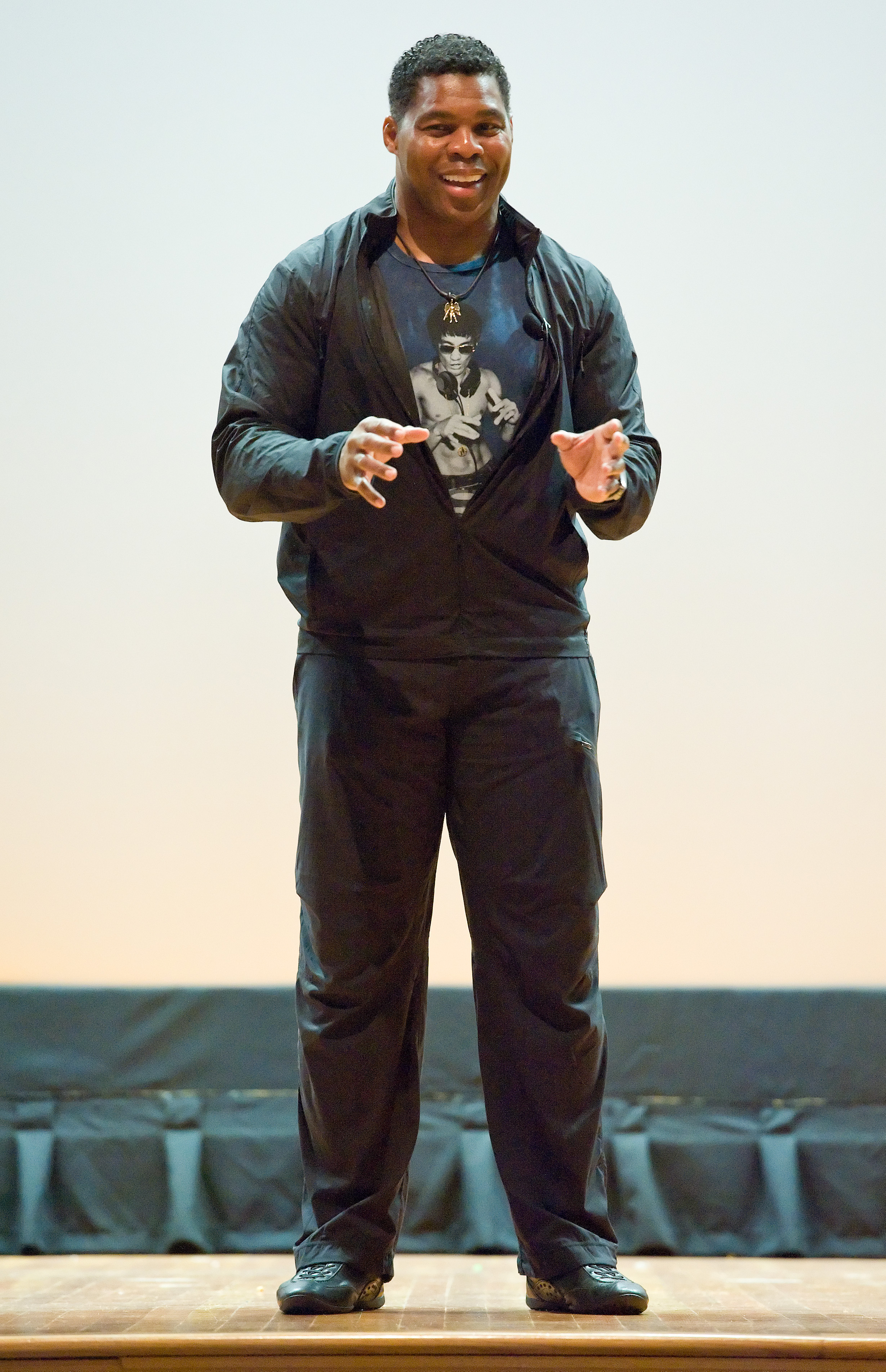
Walker in 2015

The Herschel Walker trade was the largest player trade in the history of the National Football League (NFL) and, many believe, the largest in the history of all professional sports. The deal, completed on October 12, 1989, centered on sending running back Herschel Walker from the Dallas Cowboys to the Minnesota Vikings. After the transaction was expanded to involve the San Diego Chargers, the trade moved a total of 18 players and draft picks between the three teams. At the time of the deal, the Cowboys were one of the worst teams in the league (the team finished the 1989 season with its worst post-merger record, 1–15) while Walker was still regarded as one of the league's premier running backs.

In a surprise move, the Cowboys chose to waive, cut, or trade all the players acquired from the Vikings. The Vikings had offered draft compensation for any player who was not on the Cowboys' roster by February 1st, 1990. Coach Jimmy Johnson, also in charge of roster management, had intended throughout the trade to cut all acquired players and take the draft compensation. The Cowboys would ultimately acquire eight draft picks through the trade, including Minnesota's next three first-round picks.

Today, the trade is regarded as the start of Dallas's dynasty of the 1990s and one of the most lopsided trades in sports history. Despite initial negative reception from Dallas fans, the draft picks acquired in the trade were used for further transactions to acquire several key players and win three Super Bowls soon after; Johnson claims the team made 51 trades in the following year, with Minnesota's picks acting as a key resource throughout negotiations. The Vikings, meanwhile, fell to 6–10 in 1990 and did not win a playoff game with Walker on the roster. He would depart the team following the 1991 season.

== Background ==
Four games into the 1989 season, the Cowboys were winless under new coach Jimmy Johnson, who had joined the team following the firing of Tom Landry (Landry had previously served as coach for every Cowboys season since they joined the league in 1960). Johnson, looking to take the team in a new direction, reportedly came up with the idea to trade Walker while on a morning jog with his staff. He briefly considered trading second-year wide receiver Michael Irvin to the Los Angeles Raiders, but Raiders owner Al Davis reportedly advised him not to trade Irvin. Johnson felt that Walker was the only remaining bargaining chip they had.

The Cowboys successfully started a bidding war for Walker, who had been named to two consecutive All-Pro second teams and was considered to be one of the best running backs in the league. The New York Giants were among the first teams to express interest. However, the trade would have been unfavorable for Dallas since both teams were in the NFC East division. The Atlanta Falcons entered into negotiations, but eventually pulled out over fear of Walker's future contract demands.

After the Cleveland Browns offered significant compensation for Walker, Johnson and team owner/general manager Jerry Jones decided to contact other clubs using the Browns' offer as leverage. Johnson contacted Minnesota Vikings general manager Mike Lynn. Johnson, looking to pressure the Vikings, gave Lynn a strict deadline of 6:30 p.m before he would accept the Browns' offer.

The Vikings were trying to make their first Super Bowl appearance since Super Bowl XI. In the previous two years, the Vikings lost to the Washington Redskins in the 1988 NFC Championship Game and lost to the San Francisco 49ers in the Divisional Playoffs in the 1988–89 NFL playoffs. Lynn, feeling a star running back like Walker was the missing piece to a Super Bowl run, decided to pursue the deal before the deadline. In order to get Walker to agree to a trade, the Cowboys paid him a $1.25 million "exit bonus".

== Timeline ==
In the original proposal, Dallas agreed to give Herschel Walker and three draft picks to Minnesota. In exchange, the Cowboys would receive 5 players, three draft picks, and conditional picks attached to each of those 5 players should they be cut by Dallas before February 1, 1990.

One of those players that Minnesota agreed to send to Dallas, Darrin Nelson, refused to report to the Cowboys. Dallas then agreed to trade Nelson to the San Diego Chargers for their fifth-round pick in 1990, which the Cowboys promptly sent to the Vikings. In total, this revised trade involved 18 players and draft picks (with the revised transactions involving San Diego in bold):

To Dallas Cowboys	To Minnesota Vikings	To San Diego Chargers
LB Jesse Solomon; LB David Howard; CB Issiac Holt; DE Alex Stewart; Minnesota's 1st round pick in 1990; Minnesota's 2nd round pick in 1990; Minnesota's 6th round pick in 1990; Minnesota's 1st round pick in 1991 (conditional on cutting Solomon); Minnesota's 2nd round pick in 1991 (conditional on cutting Howard); Minnesota's 1st round pick in 1992 (conditional on cutting Holt); Minnesota's 2nd round pick in 1992 **(condition met by trading away Nelson)**; Minnesota's 3rd round pick in 1992 (conditional on cutting Stewart)	RB Herschel Walker; Dallas' 3rd round pick in 1990; **San Diego's 5th round pick in 1990**; Dallas' 10th round pick in 1990; Dallas' 3rd round pick in 1991	**RB Darrin Nelson**

The Vikings had assumed that the Cowboys would keep the players acquired through the trade to rebuild their struggling roster. The trade was widely criticized in Dallas at the time, with writers such as Randy Galloway of The Dallas Morning News publicly writing against the trade. Frank Luksa of the Dallas Times Herald described the Cowboys' return as "a bag of beans and a cow to be named later." Dave Wannstedt, a member of Dallas's coaching staff, claims to have asked Johnson whether he could guarantee him a new job when the staff was fired.

Despite the criticism, Johnson openly bragged about the trade, describing it as "The Great Train Robbery." He waived Stewart in November 1989, then told his coaches to not start Solomon, Howard or Holt, signaling to the rest of the league his intention to claim the draft picks. Vikings General Manager Mike Lynn eventually made another deal, letting the Cowboys keep the three players and all the conditional picks, in exchange for two draft picks from the Cowboys.

== Aftermath and legacy ==
The Cowboys would finish the season with a 1–15 record. Further, they gave up the rights to the first overall pick in the following draft after taking quarterback Steve Walsh in the previous year's supplemental draft. Nonetheless, the picks acquired through the trade would allow the team to quickly recover, winning Super Bowl XXVII after the 1992 season.

Dallas used Minnesota's picks over the succeeding years to make trades with other teams around the NFL. The picks acquired in those were then used to draft players such as Emmitt Smith, Darren Woodson, and Russell Maryland. These players helped the Cowboys win multiple Super Bowls. In other words, the trade of Walker to the Vikings contributed largely to the Cowboys' success in the early 1990s. For this reason, it has been called one of the most lopsided trades in sports history.

Pick acquired by Dallas	Dallas' subsequent transactions (partial list)
Minnesota's 1st round pick in 1990	Used as part of a deal with the Pittsburgh Steelers to move up from No. 21 to No. 17 overall in the first round in 1990; No. 17 overall was then used to select RB Emmitt Smith
Minnesota's 2nd round pick in 1990	Used as part of a deal to get the San Francisco 49ers' 3rd round pick in 1990; San Francisco's 3rd round pick was then used as part of the above deal with Pittsburgh to move to No. 17 overall
Minnesota's 6th round pick in 1990	Used as part of a deal with the Los Angeles Raiders to acquire DB Stan Smagala
Minnesota's 1st round pick in 1991	Used as part of a deal to get the No. 1 overall pick in the 1991 draft from the New England Patriots; With the first overall pick, Dallas selected DT Russell Maryland
Minnesota's 2nd round pick in 1991	Used as part of a trade with the Houston Oilers to acquire RB Alonzo Highsmith
Minnesota's 1st round pick in 1992	Used as part of a deal to get New England's 1st and 2nd round picks (No. 19 and No. 37 overall) in the 1992 draft; No. 19 overall was then used as part of a deal to get the Atlanta Falcons' first round pick (No. 17 overall); No. 17 overall from Atlanta was then used to select CB Kevin Smith; No. 37 overall from New England was then used to select Darren Woodson
Minnesota's 2nd round pick in 1992	Used as part of a deal to acquire two draft picks from the Kansas City Chiefs; The Chiefs' picks were used in an exchange with the Washington Redskins; With Washington's 3rd round pick (No. 58 overall), Dallas selected CB Clayton Holmes
Minnesota's 3rd round pick in 1992	Used as part of the above deal to get to New England's 1st and 2nd round picks

Meanwhile, the 1989 Vikings were eliminated in the Divisional Playoffs by the eventual Super Bowl XXIV champion San Francisco 49ers for the second consecutive year. Among the four players that the Vikings selected using Dallas's picks from the trade, Mike Jones only spent two seasons with the team, and Jake Reed spent eight seasons. In 1991, the Vikings re-signed Darrin Nelson, the player who forced Minnesota and Dallas to send him to San Diego in 1989, to backup Walker; Nelson retired after two seasons.

Pick acquired by Minnesota	Player selected
Dallas' 3rd round pick in 1990	TE Mike Jones
San Diego's 5th round pick in 1990	WR Reggie Thornton
Dallas' 10th round pick in 1990	WR Pat Newman
Dallas' 3rd round pick in 1991	WR Jake Reed

Walker would play only two more seasons with the Vikings, failing to make the playoffs in both years. Walker then signed with the Philadelphia Eagles for the 1992 season and with the New York Giants in the 1995 season, later rejoining the Cowboys for the 1996 season.

Seventeen years later in 2007, the trade was still an easy target for satire: one ESPN columnist, assessing the impact of free agency on the NFL (instituted in 1993), noted that it had almost entirely replaced significant trades and by doing so "took away one of the greatest shortcuts to becoming a Super Bowl champion: fleecing the Vikings."

The trade was detailed in an ESPN 30 for 30 film, "The Great Trade Robbery".

End result of the trade at the end of the 1995 season
Dallas Cowboys	Minnesota Vikings
Three Super Bowl wins; RB Emmitt Smith; DT Russell Maryland; CB Clayton Holmes; CB Kevin Smith; S Darren Woodson	Zero Super Bowl appearances; WR Jake Reed

== See also ==
- Brock for Broglio
- White Flag Trade
- Eric Lindros trade
- Jerome Bettis trade
- Ricky Williams trade
- Deshaun Watson trade
- Luka Dončić–Anthony Davis trade
- List of largest National Football League trades
- Cowboys-Vikings rivalry
