= Ricky Williams trade =

Notable pre-draft trade in the National Football League

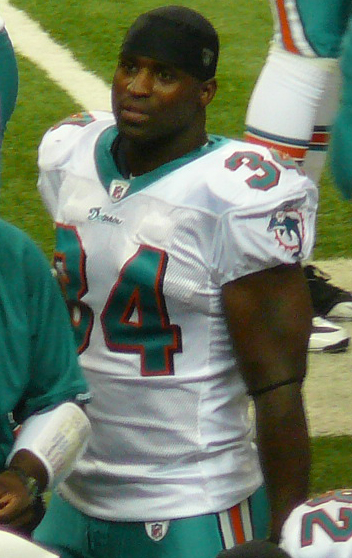
Ricky Williams with the Miami Dolphins

The Ricky Williams trade was a trade between the New Orleans Saints and Washington Redskins of the National Football League (NFL), which occurred prior to the 1999 NFL draft. Mike Ditka of the Saints wanted to move up in the draft order from the twelfth overall pick to ensure that he would be able to select Ricky Williams from the University of Texas at Austin. To do so, his team traded every pick it had in the draft, plus two of its first three picks in the 2000 NFL draft, for the fifth overall pick, with which they selected Williams.

The Saints struggled in the 1999 season, and Ditka was fired. Williams played for the Saints for three seasons before he was traded to the Miami Dolphins.

Washington did not quite benefit from the trade either. While the Redskins made the 1999 playoffs, they failed to return to the postseason until 2005.

== Background ==
Ricky Williams, a running back, played college football for the Texas Longhorns of the University of Texas at Austin. In 1998, Williams set the National Collegiate Athletic Association record for rushing yards and won the Heisman Trophy. Meanwhile, the New Orleans Saints of the National Football League (NFL), with Mike Ditka as head coach, had two consecutive seasons with a 6–10 record. The Saints tried to trade all of their picks in the 1998 NFL draft to acquire one of the top two picks, which they intended to use on Peyton Manning or Ryan Leaf, but their overtures were rejected.

Leading up to the 1999 NFL draft, Ditka decided that he wanted Williams to play for the Saints. At the NFL owners meetings held two months before the draft, he publicly stated that he would trade his entire draft to acquire Williams. Ditka compared Williams to Walter Payton, who was his star running back while he coached the Chicago Bears in the 1980s. However, other teams had doubts about Williams' passion for the game, and judgment in hiring Master P as his agent.

== The trade ==
With limited leverage, Saints' general manager Bill Kuharich began discussing trades with the teams holding the first five selections. As the Cleveland Browns needed a QB, they selected Tim Couch with the #1 pick in the draft. At 2nd overall, the Philadelphia Eagles also needed a quarterback after starting three at the position at different points during the 1998 season, and drafted Donovan McNabb. The Saints offered nine draft picks to the Cincinnati Bengals for the third overall choice, but the Bengals rejected the deal. The Bengals would go on to draft Akili Smith, one of the biggest busts in NFL history.

This trade would've given the Bengals:

- 1999 First Round Pick
- 1999 Third Round Pick
- 1999 Fourth Round Pick
- 1999 Fifth Round Pick
- 1999 Sixth Round Pick
- 1999 Seventh Round Pick
- 2000 First Round Pick
- 2001 First Round Pick
- 2002 Second Round Pick

The Indianapolis Colts had the opportunity to draft Williams at fourth overall, as they had traded Marshall Faulk to the St. Louis Rams for a second round pick and a fifth round pick in the 1999 draft. The Colts decided to pass on Williams for another running back, and drafted Edgerrin James instead.

The Saints traded their first round, third round, fourth round, fifth round, sixth round, and seventh round picks in the 1999 NFL Draft, and their first-round and third-round picks from the 2000 NFL draft to the Washington Redskins for the fifth overall pick of the 1999 NFL Draft.

The Redskins traded the 12th overall pick, the third-round draft pick acquired from the Saints, and their fourth- and fifth-round picks to the Chicago Bears to acquire the seventh overall pick. The Redskins used the pick to select Champ Bailey, the player they had coveted. They also made a second trade with the Bears, acquiring a second-round pick that allowed them to select Jon Jansen, in exchange for a second round pick and the fifth round pick acquired from the Saints.

Traded to New Orleans

- 1999 first round pick (5th overall, Ricky Williams)

Traded to Washington

- 1999 first round pick (12th overall, later traded to Chicago, used to select Cade McNown)
- 1999 third round pick (71st overall, later traded to Chicago, used to select D'Wayne Bates)
- 1999 fourth round pick (107th overall, used to select Nate Stimson)
- 1999 fifth round pick (144th overall, later traded to Chicago, used to select Khari Samuel)
- 1999 sixth round pick (179th overall, later traded to Denver, used to select Desmond Clark)
- 1999 seventh round pick (218th overall, later traded to Denver, used to select Billy Miller)
- 2000 first round pick (2nd overall, used to select LaVar Arrington)
- 2000 third round pick (64th overall, used to select Lloyd Harrison)

== Aftermath ==
Williams and Ditka on the cover of ESPN The Magazine's issue of August 9, 1999

After the trade, Ditka and Williams appeared on the cover of the August 9, 1999, issue of ESPN The Magazine, dressed as a bride and groom. The socially conservative Ditka agreed to the photoshoot as long as he wasn't wearing the wedding dress. Photographer Greg Heisler chose this pose to illustrate how enamored Ditka was with Williams, and considers it to be one of his favorite photos. Williams signed a contract with an $8 million signing bonus and salary incentives that would be worth between $11 million to $68 million, though many of the incentives were difficult to attain. Many agents and sportswriters criticized the contract, saying that Williams should have received more guaranteed money in his contract.

The Saints struggled to a 3–13 season in the 1999 season, their second-worst in franchise history. Arguably, the biggest low point of the season was in Week 8, where the Saints fell to 1-7 after becoming the first team to lose to the expansion Cleveland Browns on a Hail Mary pass. Williams had a disappointing rookie season, due to various injuries that limited him to 884 rushing yards and two touchdowns in 12 games, as well as alienating teammates through his off-field behavior. The Saints fired Ditka, Kuharich and all of Ditka's offensive and defensive coaches except for Assistant Head Coach Rick Venturi got fired after the season. Without the traded draft picks, Randy Mueller and Jim Haslett, the new general manager and coach respectively, signed 27 free agents to a total of $15 million to fill out the roster.

At the end of his rookie season, Williams expressed resentment towards Ditka and New Orleans. He rebounded to two straight seasons with 1,000 rushing yards or more. However, Williams expressed an interest in playing baseball, leading the Saints to select Deuce McAllister in the first round of the 2001 NFL draft. With the emergence of McAllister and Williams' off-field issues, the Saints traded Williams away after three seasons. In exchange for Williams and their fourth round pick in the 2002 NFL draft (used on Randy McMichael), New Orleans acquired the Miami Dolphins' first round pick (25th overall, Charles Grant), fourth round pick (125th overall, Keyuo Craver) and first round pick in the 2003 NFL draft (18th overall, subsequently traded to the Arizona Cardinals, Calvin Pace). Williams ended his tenure with the Saints with 3,129 rushing yards in three seasons.

Neither the Redskins nor the Saints benefited from the trade greatly. The Redskins acquired Bailey and LaVar Arrington and both were elected to the Pro Bowl, but after making the postseason in 1999, they failed to return until 2005. The Redskins later traded Bailey to the Denver Broncos for Clinton Portis. Part of this could be because of the new owner of the Redskins, Dan Snyder, who made Charley Casserly (The man who made the trade with New Orleans) resign as GM and replaced him with Vinny Cerrato. The Bears used the Saints' original first round pick to select Cade McNown, who had a 3–12 winning record in two seasons before he was released.

Ditka ended his tenure with the Saints with a 15–33 win–loss record in three seasons. He did not coach again. When asked about the trade in 2010, Ditka said he would make it again.

In a 2013 list of the worst NFL trades ever made, Sports Illustrated ranked the Ricky Williams trade as the second-worst, following only the Herschel Walker trade.

== See also ==
- Brock for Broglio
- Eric Lindros trade
- Herschel Walker trade
- Jerome Bettis trade
- White Flag Trade
- Deshaun Watson trade
- Luka Dončić–Anthony Davis trade
- List of largest National Football League trades
