= Brock for Broglio =

Unexpectedly lopsided trade in baseball

The phrase "Brock for Broglio" is sometimes used in the sport of baseball to signify a trade that, in hindsight, turns out to be an extremely lopsided transaction.

The names in the phrase refer to Lou Brock and Ernie Broglio respectively, the centerpieces of a June 15, 1964, six-player deal: Brock, Jack Spring and Paul Toth were traded from the Chicago Cubs to the St. Louis Cardinals in exchange for Broglio, Bobby Shantz, and Doug Clemens.

It was thought initially the Cubs had done better in the deal, as Broglio was coming off some impressive seasons while pitching for the Cardinals, while Brock had been considered a disappointment for the Cubs.

Almost immediately, however, the trade was re-judged by sportswriters. Brock batted .348 for the Cardinals and led them to winning the 1964 World Series. Brock also helped the Cardinals to another World Series title in 1967, a pennant in 1968, and played successfully for St. Louis through 1979, amassing 3,023 hits and 938 stolen bases (at the time becoming baseball's all-time leader in stolen bases) en route to his Hall of Fame election in 1985. Meanwhile, Broglio went only 4–7 with a 4.04 ERA for the Cubs, and by 1966 was out of Major League Baseball. Broglio did not tell anyone at the time, but he had an injured elbow since the second half of the 1963 season, and in November 1964, had his ulnar nerve reset.

This is sometimes referred to as the most lopsided trade in baseball history.

The Emil Verban Society, an association of Cubs fans in the Washington, D.C. area, which includes national political leaders and journalists, occasionally recognizes bad decision-making with the "Brock-for-Broglio Judgment Award"—presented, for example, to Saddam Hussein for his invasion of Kuwait in 1990.

== See also ==
- Herschel Walker trade
- White Flag Trade
- Eric Lindros trade
- Ricky Williams trade
- Deshaun Watson trade
- Luka Dončić–Anthony Davis trade
