= Mike Ricci (ice hockey) =

Canadian ice hockey player (born 1971)

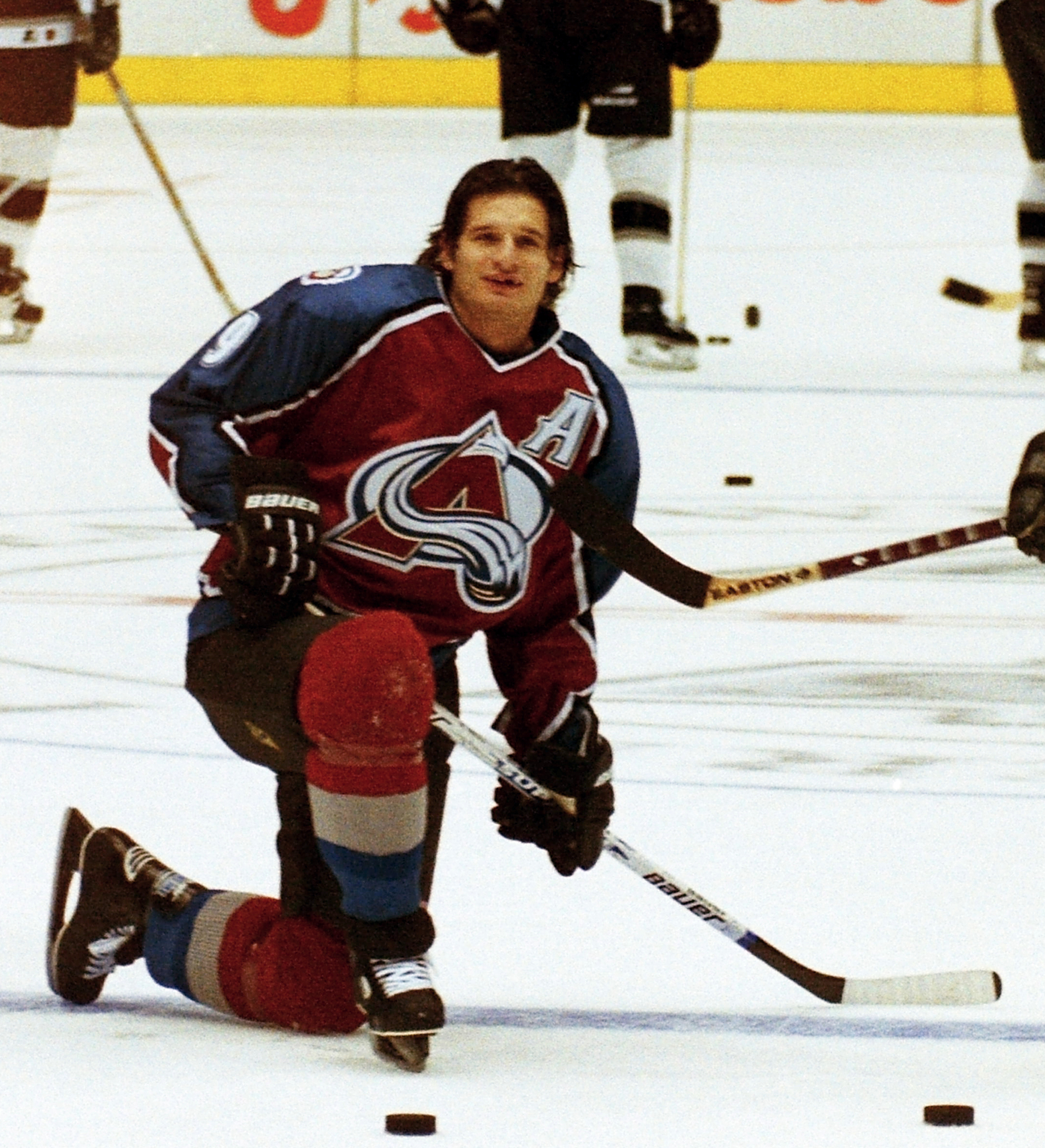
- Ricci with the Colorado Avalanche in 1997
- Born: October 27, 1971 (age 54) Scarborough, Ontario, Canada
- Height: 6 ft 0 in (183 cm)
- Weight: 200 lb (91 kg; 14 st 4 lb)
- Position: Centre
- Shot: Left
- Played for: Philadelphia Flyers; Quebec Nordiques; Colorado Avalanche; San Jose Sharks; Phoenix Coyotes
- National team: Canada
- NHL draft: 4th overall, 1990; Philadelphia Flyers
- Playing career: 1990–2006
Medal record
Representing Canada
Ice hockey
World Championships
Gold medal – first place	1994 Bolzano
World Junior Championships
Gold medal – first place	1990 Helsinki

Michael Ricci (born October 27, 1971) is a Canadian former professional ice hockey centre who played 16 seasons in the National Hockey League (NHL) for the Philadelphia Flyers, Quebec Nordiques, Colorado Avalanche, San Jose Sharks and Phoenix Coyotes.

Ricci currently serves in the Sharks front office as a scout & development coach.

== Playing career ==
Ricci was born and raised in Scarborough, Ontario. He attended St. Maximilian Kolbe Catholic school and Dr. Norman Bethune Collegiate Institute. As a youth, he played in the 1984 Quebec International Pee-Wee Hockey Tournament with a minor ice hockey team from Mississauga. He was a 2nd round pick of the Ontario Hockey League's Peterborough Petes in 1987 after a strong season with the Toronto Marlboros Bantams.

Ricci was also a talented soccer player growing up playing for the Scarborough Blues program with his cousin, Paul Peschisolido, who went on to a solid international career. Ricci's father Mario was a professional soccer player in Italy before emigrating to Canada.

Ricci was selected in the 1st Round 4th overall by the Philadelphia Flyers in the 1990 NHL entry draft. He had just completed three stellar seasons with the Peterborough Petes, and was dubbed a cannot-miss prospect. Ricci lasted only two years in Philadelphia, as in the summer of 1992 he was traded to the Quebec Nordiques in the Eric Lindros trade. He had a career year in his first season with the Nordiques, scoring 78 points. The next season, 1993–94, he scored a career-high 30 goals, with 5 of those coming in one game against the San Jose Sharks. In 1996, Ricci and the Colorado Avalanche won the Stanley Cup following the franchise's relocation from Quebec. On November 21, 1997, Ricci began a new endeavor with the Sharks.

Ricci quickly became an elite defensive centreman with San Jose, but never was able to regain the offensive prowess of his earlier years. Ricci was an essential cog to San Jose's success, and was there when the team made its first trip to the Western Conference Final in 2004. San Jose fans admired Ricci for his gritty style of play and were saddened when he was let go.

In 2005, Ricci switched his uniform number to 40 in honor of former National Football League (NFL) player Pat Tillman, who was killed in action while serving for the U.S. Army. The two had met in San Jose. Ricci played the 2005–06 season with the Phoenix Coyotes.

On August 13, 2007, he announced his retirement after telling The Peterborough Examiner that he had not recovered from neck surgery as well as he had hoped.

== Post-playing career ==
Ricci rejoined the Sharks organization in the 2007–08 season as an advisor, and was introduced at the Sharks' rescheduled Opening Night festivities on October 18, 2007. He is actively involved in the Sharks Alumni Foundation.

On December 11, 2019, Ricci was named an assistant coach for the Sharks.

== Acting ==
Ricci had a bit-part as Elmer Lach in the 2005 Quebec film The Rocket, about the life of Maurice Richard. Out of several NHL players who appear in the film, Ricci and Sean Avery are the only ones with any dialogue.

== Personal life ==
Ricci and his wife Beth, who is from Peterborough, Ontario, were married July 4, 1998. They have three children. Ricci is an accomplished soccer player, fisherman, and avid fan of the NFL's San Francisco 49ers. He owns property in Los Gatos, CA and a lakeside cottage in Haliburton, Ontario. He's a cousin of former footballer Paul Peschisolido.

== Records ==
- Ricci held the San Jose Sharks' franchise record for consecutive games played at 228 (later surpassed by Patrick Marleau).

== Career statistics ==
=== Regular season and playoffs ===
			Regular season					Playoffs
Season	Team	League	GP	G	A	Pts	PIM	GP	G	A	Pts	PIM
1986–87	Toronto Marlboros AAA	MTHL	38	39	42	81	27	—	—	—	—	—
1987–88	Peterborough Petes	OHL	41	24	37	61	20	12	7	6	13	12
1988–89	Peterborough Petes	OHL	60	54	52	106	43	17	19	16	35	18
1989–90	Peterborough Petes	OHL	60	52	64	116	39	—	—	—	—	—
1990–91	Philadelphia Flyers	NHL	68	21	20	41	64	—	—	—	—	—
1991–92	Philadelphia Flyers	NHL	78	20	36	56	93	—	—	—	—	—
1992–93	Quebec Nordiques	NHL	77	27	51	78	123	6	0	6	6	8
1993–94	Quebec Nordiques	NHL	83	30	21	51	113	—	—	—	—	—
1994–95	Quebec Nordiques	NHL	48	15	21	36	40	6	1	3	4	8
1995–96	Colorado Avalanche	NHL	62	6	21	27	52	22	6	11	17	18
1996–97	Colorado Avalanche	NHL	63	13	19	32	59	17	2	4	6	17
1997–98	Colorado Avalanche	NHL	6	0	4	4	2	—	—	—	—	—
1997–98	San Jose Sharks	NHL	59	9	14	23	30	6	1	3	4	6
1998–99	San Jose Sharks	NHL	82	13	26	39	68	6	2	3	5	10
1999–00	San Jose Sharks	NHL	82	20	24	44	60	12	5	1	6	2
2000–01	San Jose Sharks	NHL	81	22	22	44	60	6	0	3	3	0
2001–02	San Jose Sharks	NHL	79	19	34	53	44	12	4	6	10	4
2002–03	San Jose Sharks	NHL	75	11	23	34	53	—	—	—	—	—
2003–04	San Jose Sharks	NHL	71	7	19	26	40	17	2	3	5	4
2005–06	Phoenix Coyotes	NHL	78	10	6	16	69	—	—	—	—	—
2006–07	San Antonio Rampage	AHL	2	0	0	0	0	—	—	—	—	—
2006–07	Phoenix Coyotes	NHL	7	0	1	1	4	—	—	—	—	—
NHL totals			1,099	243	362	605	979	110	23	43	66	77

=== International ===
Year	Team	Event	Result	GP	G	A	Pts	PIM
1989	Canada	WJC	4th	7	5	2	7	6
1990	Canada	WJC	1st place, gold medalist(s)	5	0	4	4	0
1994	Canada	WC	1st place, gold medalist(s)	8	2	1	3	8
Junior totals				12	5	6	11	6
Senior totals				8	2	1	3	8

== Awards and honours ==
Award	Year
OHL
Second All-Star Team	1989
First All-Star Team	1990
Red Tilson Trophy	1990
William Hanley Trophy	1990
CHL Player of the Year	1990
NHL
Stanley Cup (Colorado Avalanche)	1996

== See also ==
- List of NHL players with 1,000 games played

Awards and achievements
Preceded by Bryan Fogarty	CHL Player of the Year; 1990	Succeeded by Eric Lindros
Preceded by Claude Boivin	Philadelphia Flyers' first-round draft pick 1990	Succeeded by Peter Forsberg
Preceded by Owen Nolan	San Jose Sharks captain 2003 first 10 games	Succeeded by Vincent Damphousse
