= David Howard (linebacker) =

American football player (born 1961)

No. 99, 51, 58
- Position: Linebacker

Personal information
- Born: December 8, 1961 (age 64); Enterprise, Alabama, U.S.
- Listed height: 6 ft 2 in (1.88 m)
- Listed weight: 232 lb (105 kg)

Career information
- High school: Long Beach Polytechnic (Long Beach, California)
- College: Oregon State; Long Beach State
- Supplemental draft: 1984: 3rd round, 67th overall pick

Career history
- Los Angeles Express (1984–1985); Minnesota Vikings (1985–1989); Dallas Cowboys (1989–1990); New England Patriots (1991–1992)

Awards and highlights
- 2× All-PCAA (1982, 1983); Second-team All-PCAA (1981)

Career NFL statistics
- Games played: 120
- Stats at Pro Football Reference

David Howard (born December 8, 1961) is an American former professional football player who was a linebacker in the National Football League (NFL) for the Minnesota Vikings, Dallas Cowboys and New England Patriots. He also was a member of the Los Angeles Express in the United States Football League (USFL). He played college football for the Oregon State Beavers and Long Beach State 49ers.

== Early life ==
Howard attended Long Beach Polytechnic High School, where he was the city co-player of the year in 1978. He accepted a football scholarship from Oregon State University and was a starter as a freshman at linebacker, but decided to transfer to Long Beach State at the end of the season.

He was named the starter at middle linebacker as a sophomore. As a senior, he registered 89 tackles (51 solo), 6 tackles for loss and 2 fumble recoveries. He finished his career with 242 tackles, 17 sacks, 6 interceptions and 16 passes defensed.

In 1998, he was inducted into the Long Beach State Hall of Fame.

== Professional career ==
=== Los Angeles Express ===
Howard was selected in the 1984 USFL Territorial Draft by the Los Angeles Express. He was a starter the two years he played for the team.

=== Minnesota Vikings ===
He was selected by the Minnesota Vikings in the third round of the 1984 NFL Supplemental Draft of USFL and CFL players. In 1985, he replaced an injured Scott Studwell and received 4 starts after the twelfth game of the season. He registered 80 tackles, 5 passes defensed and 3 forced fumbles.

The next year, he was named the starter at right outside linebacker, posting 88 tackles (sixth on the team), 55 solo tackles, 2 passes defensed and 3 forced fumbles (tied for the team lead), despite missing three games with a hyper-extended right elbow.

In 1987, he played in 10 games (7 starts) after missing four games with a sprained ankle, recording 33 tackles (24 solo), 2 passes defensed and one interception. The next year, he started in all the games, finishing with 46 tackles (31 solo), 3 interceptions, 2 fumble recoveries and one forced fumble. Against the Dallas Cowboys, he had 2 solo tackles, one sack, one forced fumble and a fumble recovery.

On October 12, 1989, he was sent to the Dallas Cowboys as part of the Herschel Walker trade. At the time he started 3 games and had 15 tackles.

=== Dallas Cowboys ===
In 1989, his playing time was limited because there were conditional draft picks attached to the Vikings traded players and the Dallas Cowboys wanted the selections instead of keeping Howard and the others. Head coach Jimmy Johnson eventually had second thoughts on the February 1 deadline and traded three future draft choices (third-round and tenth-round in 1990 and a third-round in 1991) to the Vikings for the right to retain the original full package of draft choices, plus Howard, Issiac Holt and Jesse Solomon. He shared the strongside linebacker position with Jack Del Rio in the final eight games, playing in the second and fourth quarters. He finished the season with 18 tackles (9 solo) and one quarterback pressure in 11 games.

In 1990, he appeared in 16 games as a backup and made 11 tackles (3 solo). On April 19, 1991, after not having any starts during his time with the Cowboys, he was traded to the New England Patriots along with linebacker Eugene Lockhart, cornerback Ron Francis, a 1991 first round pick (#11 Pat Harlow), and a 1991 second round pick (#41 Jerome Henderson), in exchange for the first overall draft pick of the 1991 NFL draft (Russell Maryland).

=== New England Patriots ===
In 1991, he played in all 16 games (5 starts) at right outside linebacker, registering 60 tackles (40 solo), 3 passes defensed and one sack.

The next year, he played in 16 games (10 starts), finishing with 78 tackles (59 solo), 3 forced fumbles (tied team lead), 2 special teams tackles and one interception. He was released on July 24, 1993, after having a difference of opinion about his sprained toe with new head coach Bill Parcells.

David is CEO of Empower Me Inc. David is also founder of Urban Village Family Services and Stop Six Realty LLC.
