= Tim MacMahon =

American sportswriter for ESPN.com

- Education: University of North Texas
- Occupation: Sportswriter
- Years active: 2003–present

Tim MacMahon is an American sportswriter for ESPN.com who covers the National Basketball Association (NBA). He covered the Dallas Cowboys, Dallas Mavericks, and Texas Rangers for The Dallas Morning News before moving to ESPN in 2009. He is the author of The Wonder Boy: Luka Doncic and the Curse of Greatness.

== Career ==
MacMahon started out studying business and playing basketball at a Division II school in Florida. He transferred to the University of North Texas (UNT) to major in broadcast journalism. At UNT, he worked for the Denton Record-Chronicle and The Dallas Morning News. Post-university, he began working at ESPN Dallas.

In 2016, MacMahon's role at ESPN changed, moving from being a full-time Mavericks beat writer to covering all the NBA. Mark Cuban was reportedly unhappy with this change, and revoked the media credentials of MacMahon and Marc Stein. The credentials were later restored. In an interview in 2023, Jason Kidd made comments about MacMahon not being positive enough in his journalism. In January 2024, Luka Dončić and MacMahon clashed over an interaction between a fan and Dončić, and MacMahon's reporting of the incident, which Dončić considered to be biased.

MacMahon is a regular on the Hoop Collective podcast, where he is introduced as "Banned MacMahon" and given his own theme song.
