= Issiac Holt =

American football player (born 1962)

No. 30
- Position: Cornerback

Personal information
- Born: October 4, 1962 (age 64); Birmingham, Alabama, U.S.
- Listed height: 6 ft 2 in (1.88 m)
- Listed weight: 197 lb (89 kg)

Career information
- High school: Carver (Birmingham)
- College: Alcorn State
- NFL draft: 1985: 2nd round, 30th overall pick

Career history
- Minnesota Vikings (1985–1989); Dallas Cowboys (1989–1992); Miami Dolphins (1993)*
- * Offseason or practice squad member only

Awards and highlights
- Super Bowl champion (XXVII); Division I-AA All-American (1984); All-SWAC (1984); 2× Second-team All-SWAC (1982, 1983)

Career NFL statistics
- Interceptions: 23
- Touchdowns: 3
- Punts blocked: 7
- Stats at Pro Football Reference

Issiac Holt III (born October 4, 1962) is an American former professional football player who was a cornerback in the National Football League (NFL) for the Minnesota Vikings and Dallas Cowboys. He played college football for the Alcorn State Braves. He won Super Bowl XXVII with the Cowboys.

== Early life ==
Holt attended George Washington Carver High School. As a senior, he was named the area defensive back of the year.

He accepted a football scholarship from Alcorn State University where he was named a starter at cornerback as a freshman, registering 5 interceptions (tied for the team lead), 32 tackles and one fumble recovery. The next year, he led the team with 7 interceptions, recorded 38 tackles and 10 passes defensed. During his junior season, he led the team with 6 interceptions and had 36 tackles.

As a senior, he helped the team win the Southwestern Athletic Conference and the Black college football national championship with a 9–0 overall record, while leading the team with six interceptions (one returned for a touchdown), registering 25 tackles and 7 passes defensed.

In his last year, his game against Jerry Rice and the Mississippi Valley State University is remembered as one of his best, when he limited the future Hall of Famer to eight receptions for 134 yards and also returned an interception for a touchdown. He finished his college eligibility with a school and a Division I-AA record of 24 career interceptions. He also had 38 passes defensed.

== Professional career ==
=== Minnesota Vikings ===
Holt was selected by the Minnesota Vikings in the second round (30th overall) of the 1985 NFL draft. He also was selected third overall in the 1985 USFL draft by the San Antonio Gunslingers. He was a backup as a rookie, tallying 25 tackles, one interception and 2 passes defensed.

In his second season, he became the starter at left cornerback, registering 52 tackles, 15 passes defensed, 2 blocked punts, a team leading 8 interceptions and recovered a blocked punt for a touchdown.

In 1987, he played in only nine games after suffering a knee injury in training camp. In the NFC Divisional playoff game, he faced Jerry Rice and helped contain him to 3 receptions. He posted 18 tackles, 2 interceptions and 4 passes defensed.

In 1988, he started the first nine games before missing three of the next four contests with a bruised thigh. He was backup in the final three games of the regular season and in the playoffs. He made a last-minute game-saving interception in a 23–21 win against the Philadelphia Eagles. He registered 34 tackles, 2 interceptions, 20 passes defensed, one blocked punt and one safety.

In 1989, he returned a 90-yard interception for a touchdown against the Detroit Lions. On October 12, he was sent to the Dallas Cowboys as part of the Herschel Walker trade. He started one game out of 5, making 5 tackles, one interception and 2 passes defensed.

=== Dallas Cowboys ===
In 1989, he didn't start because there were conditional draft picks attached to the Vikings traded players and the Dallas Cowboys wanted the selections instead of keeping Holt and the others. Head coach Jimmy Johnson eventually had second thoughts on the February 1 deadline and traded three future draft choices (third-round and tenth-round in 1990 and a third-round in 1991) to the Vikings for the right to retain the original full package of draft choices, plus Holt, Jesse Solomon and David Howard. He finished the season with 15 tackles and 2 passes defensed.

In 1990, he was named the starter at left cornerback, collecting 53 tackles, 3 interceptions (tied for the team lead), 18 passes defensed (led the team) and 2 blocked punts. He missed the season opener against the Washington Redskins with a groin injury.

In 1991, he posted 53 tackles, 4 interceptions (led the team), 21 passes defensed (led the team) and one blocked punt. The next year, he registered 11 starts, 30 tackles, 2 interceptions, 9 passes defensed, one safety and one blocked punt, while being a part of the Super Bowl XXVII Championship team.

From 1990 to 1992, Holt became one of the top players on the team's defense at left cornerback, posting a total of 9 interceptions.

On April 30, 1993, after Holt questioned the number of voluntary off-season workouts, he was released by Johnson, who was looking to send the team a message. He left as the Cowboys career leader with 4 blocked punts and was the last of the five players from the Herschel Walker trade still on the team.

=== Miami Dolphins ===
On June 10, 1993, Holt was signed as a free agent by the Miami Dolphins. He was cut on August 23.
