= Deshaun Watson trade =

2022 Browns-Texans NFL quarterback trade

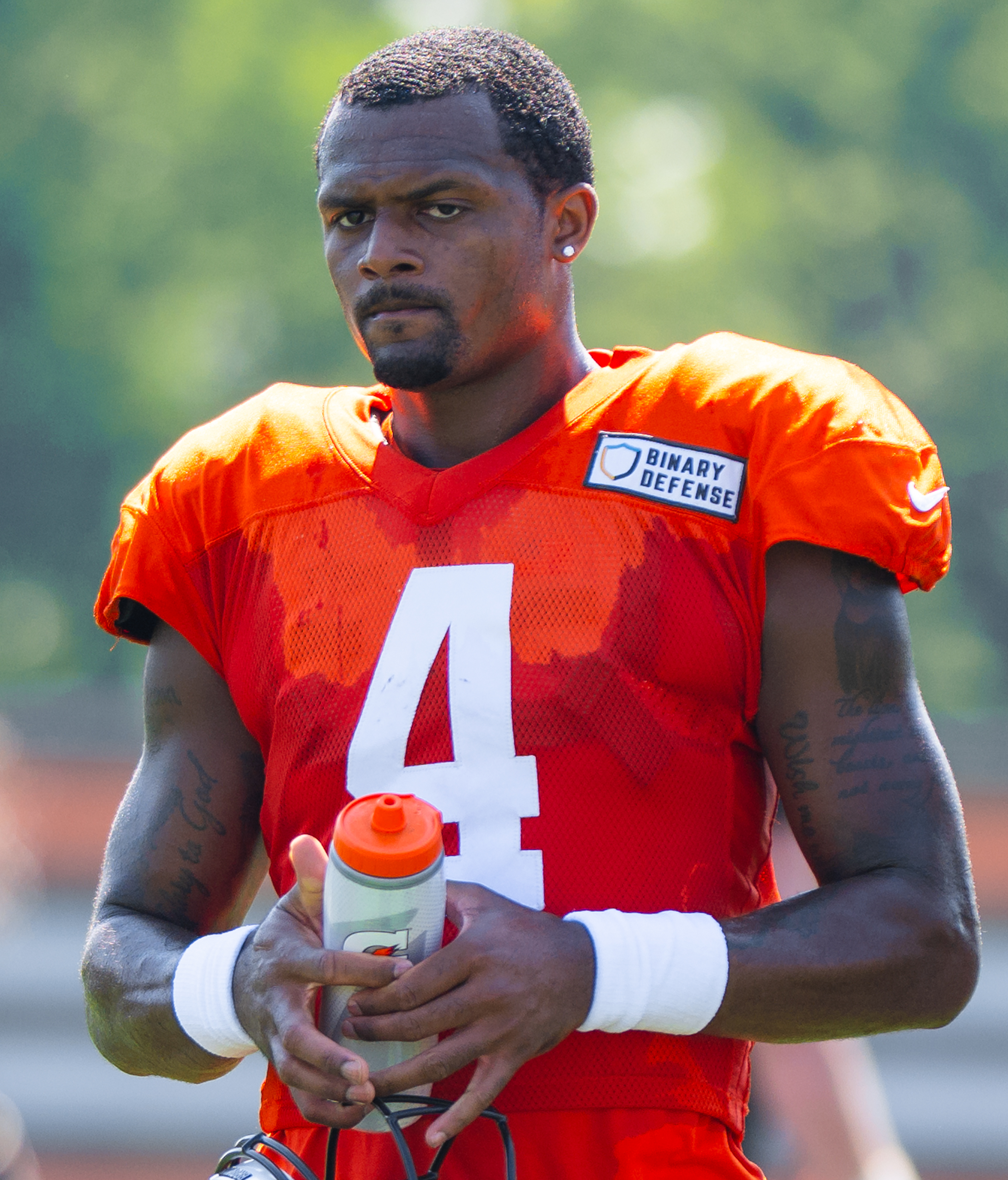
QB Deshaun Watson with the Cleveland Browns in 2023, following his trade from the Houston Texans.

The Deshaun Watson trade was a significant National Football League trade made on March 18, 2022, centered on sending quarterback Deshaun Watson from the Houston Texans to the Cleveland Browns. The quarterback and a Texans 2024 sixth round selection was exchanged for Cleveland's 2022 first and fourth round selections, 2023 first and third round selections, and 2024 first and fourth round selections.

The trade and ensuing contract, guaranteeing Deshaun Watson $230 million over five seasons, is currently considered by some sports media outlets and analysts to be one of the worst trades in the history of the NFL. This is in part due to the perceived lopsidedness of the first round picks granted to the Texans that were used to draft several Pro Bowlers and starting players including Defensive Rookie of the Year Will Anderson. Additionally, Baker Mayfield, the Browns' previous starting quarterback who was traded to the Carolina Panthers in the aftermath of the trade, saw success on the Tampa Bay Buccaneers, leading them to consecutive division titles in 2023 and 2024 and a playoff victory in 2023, as well as Pro Bowl appearances in 2023 and 2024. Watson's play in the same time frame was marred by a lack of efficiency compared to his time on the Texans, as well as back-to-back season ending injuries in 2023 and 2024. In January 2025, Watson suffered a second rupture to his right Achilles tendon and missed the entire 2025 NFL season.

The trade has received criticism due to it occurring in the midst of a series of sexual assault lawsuits filed against Watson, with multiple outlets describing the trade as bringing significant PR baggage to the Cleveland Browns franchise and damaging fan support. Many found the organization difficult to support on an ethical basis as a result of the trade, as well as replacing Mayfield. In 2025, Browns owner Jimmy Haslam called the trade "a big swing and miss."

== Background ==
=== Houston Texans ===
Deshaun Watson began his professional career with the 2017 Houston Texans. After a season-ending injury in his rookie year, his tenure with the Texans was marked by two consecutive AFC South titles in 2018 and 2019. Watson's performance peaked in 2020 when he led the league in passing yards with 4,823 yards in spite of the Texans' abysmal 4-12 record. That same year, Watson had the 3rd best touchdown-to-interception ratio at 33:7, and the 2nd highest passer rating in the NFL at 112.4, trailing only behind Aaron Rodgers who was named the league's Most Valuable Player that season. During his time with the Texans, Watson was known for his proficiency as a dual-threat quarterback (in spite of Watson disliking the term due to its perceived stereotyping of black quarterbacks), as well as his completion percentage of passes with 20 or more air yards; boasting a 43% completion rate on such throws, representing the 6th best in the NFL at the time.

The 2020 season was the Texans' final season with Deshaun Watson as the starting quarterback, as he would sit out the next season amidst sexual misconduct allegations as well as his own request to be traded over conflicts within coaching changes. Watson's final game as a Texan was on January 3, 2021, a 38–41 loss to the Tennessee Titans.

=== Cleveland Browns ===
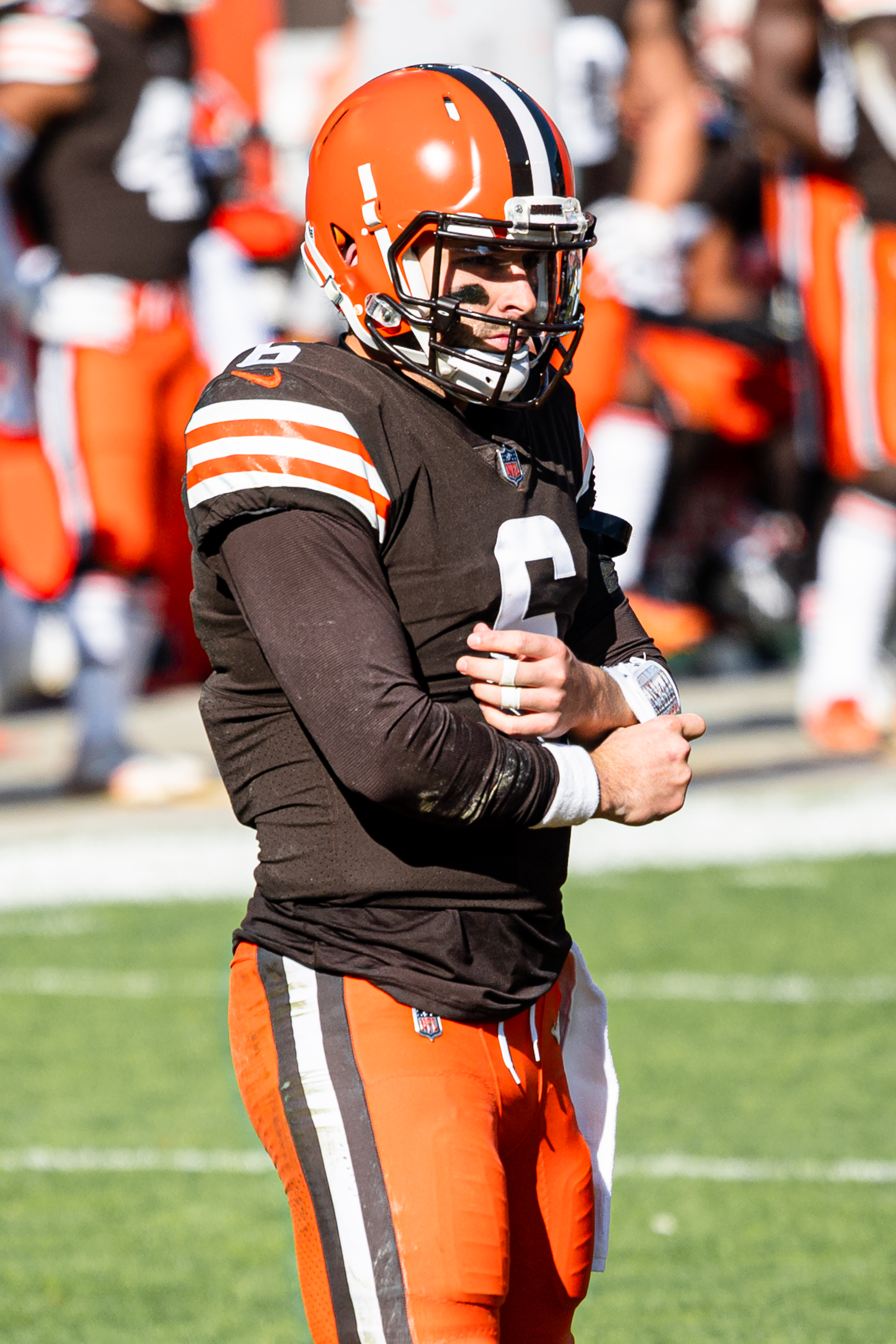
Then-Cleveland Browns quarterback Baker Mayfield, who was traded away the same year as the Deshaun Watson trade.

The Cleveland Browns made the decision to move on from their previous quarterback, Baker Mayfield, following the 2021 season due to his poor performance while suffering from a shoulder injury. Insider reports of the Browns indicated that Mayfield was considered too immature to be a team leader, leading to him being traded away to the Carolina Panthers, with insider reports stating that the Browns leadership wanted an "adult" at the quarterback position.

=== Deshaun Watson sexual assault allegations ===
On March 16, 2021, a Houston massage therapist filed a civil lawsuit delivered by attorney Tony Buzbee against then-Texans' quarterback Deshaun Watson, claiming that Watson had touched her with the tip of his erect penis while asking her for sex during a visit to her home for treatment in March 2020. Watson vehemently denied Buzbee's claims, stating that "I have never treated any woman with anything other than the utmost respect." According to the suit, the massage therapist immediately ended the session and cried after the incident. Several weeks later, two additional NFL players contacted the massage therapist on Watson's recommendation. The suit also claims that Watson later reached out to the massage therapist and apologized for his actions.

Over the next few days, several more civil lawsuits were filed against Watson by further massage therapists represented by Buzbee accusing him of being a "serial predator", with allegations including Watson directing victims to massage his anus and penis and forcing them to touch it, forcing a victim to perform oral sex on him, attempting to forcibly kiss a victim, locking doors behind victims to force sexual assault, and telling therapists to keep quiet about what happened.

By April 5, 2021, 22 lawsuits had been filed against Watson, though 18 professional massage therapists have since expressed support of his character, saying that the allegations contradict their experiences with Watson. On April 7, 2021, Nike and Beats By Dre suspended endorsement deals with Watson. Reliant Energy and H-E-B stated that they did not plan on engaging with Watson in the future. These legal challenges led to Watson's absence from the field for the entire 2021 season, during which he remained with the Houston Texans but did not participate in any games. The situation was further complicated by Watson's simultaneous request for a trade from the team.

On March 11, 2022, a grand jury declined to indict Watson on criminal charges related to "harassment and sexual misconduct". On that date he still faced 22 civil lawsuits, many alleging sexual misconduct and assault. After two more accusers joined the lawsuit in June 2022, Watson settled 23 of the 24 lawsuits in July and August.

On August 1, as a result of these allegations, Watson was suspended for six regular season games to start the 2022 season by NFL disciplinary officer Sue Lewis Robinson. Two days later, the NFL appealed the suspension, seeking to extend the suspension to at least a full season as well as seeking a fine and establishing a requirement for Watson to seek treatment for his conduct. The appeal was reviewed by former New Jersey Attorney General Peter C. Harvey. On August 18, after the NFL and the NFLPA reached a settlement, Watson was suspended for the first 11 games of the season and was fined $5 million.

== Timeline ==
Despite the ongoing legal issues, the Cleveland Browns acquired Watson in a high-profile trade in March 2022. At the time of signing, Watson's five-year deal included $230 million in guaranteed money, which set a new benchmark for guaranteed contracts in the NFL especially among quarterbacks. Subsequently, several larger contracts were signed for quarterbacks on other teams, leading to several records for the largest contracts in the NFL.

| To Houston Texans | To Cleveland Browns |
|---|---|
| Cleveland's first-round pick in 2022 (No. 13); Cleveland's fourth-round pick in 2022 (No. 104, originally from Detroit); Cleveland's first-round pick in 2023 (No. 12); Cleveland's third-round pick in 2023 (No. 73); Cleveland's first-round pick in 2024 (No. 23); Cleveland's fourth-round pick in 2024 (No. 123) | QB Deshaun Watson; Houston's 6th round pick in 2024 (No. 203) |

== Aftermath and legacy ==
=== Houston Texans ===
| Pick acquired by Houston | Houston's subsequent transactions |
|---|---|
| Cleveland's first-round pick in 2022 (13th) | The 2022 first-round pick (13th overall) was traded to the Philadelphia Eagles for their 15th overall pick used to draft OL Kenyon Green, and receive the 124th, 162th, and 166th overall picks. Green played two seasons for the Texans before being traded with a 2026 5th round pick to the Philadelphia Eagles for safety C. J. Gardner-Johnson along with an Eagles' 2026 6th round pick.; The 124th pick was then traded to the Cleveland Browns with the 68th and 108th pick for the 44th overall pick, which the Texans used to draft WR John Metchie III.; The 162nd pick was then traded to the Denver Broncos with their 80th pick for the 75th overall pick, used to draft linebacker Christian Harris.; The 166th pick was then traded to the Chicago Bears with their 207th pick for the 150th overall pick, used to draft DL Thomas Booker. |
| Cleveland's fourth-round pick in 2022 (104th) | The 2022 fourth-round pick (104th overall) was used to draft RB Dameon Pierce. |
| Cleveland's first-round pick in 2023 (12th) | The 2023 first-round pick (12th overall) was traded to the Arizona Cardinals with their 33rd pick and a 2024 first-round pick (27th overall) for the 3rd overall pick to draft DE Will Anderson Jr. and the 105th pick.; The 105th overall pick was then traded to the Philadelphia Eagles for a 2024 3rd-round pick, which was used to draft DB Calen Bullock. |
| Cleveland's third-round pick in 2023 (73rd) | The 2023 third-round pick (73rd overall) was traded to the Los Angeles Rams with their 161st pick for the 69th pick, used to draft WR Tank Dell. |
| Cleveland's first-round pick in 2024 (23rd) | The 2024 first-round pick (23rd overall) was traded to the Minnesota Vikings with their 232nd pick for the 42nd overall pick used to draft DB Kamari Lassiter, the 188th overall pick used to draft LB Jamal Hill, and Minnesota's 2025 2nd round pick.; Minnesota's 2025 2nd round pick was later traded to the Buffalo Bills in exchange for WR Stefon Diggs, a 2024 sixth-round pick (189th overall), and a 2025 fifth-round pick. |
| Cleveland's fourth-round pick in 2024 (123rd) | The 2024 fourth-round pick (123rd overall) was traded to the Philadelphia Eagles and then back to the Texans to draft TE Cade Stover. |

Based on CBS Sports, all of the received draft picks and subsequent trades resulted in the Texans acquiring: "the 2023 NFL Defensive Rookie of the Year Will Anderson Jr., starting wide receiver Tank Dell, starting left guard Kenyon Green, starting free safety Calen Bullock, starting cornerback Kamari Lassiter, wide receiver John Metchie III, linebacker Christian Harris, running back Dameon Pierce, linebacker Jamal Hill, and tight end Cade Stover. They also acquired an extra 2025 second-round pick via the Vikings, because of the compensation they received from the Browns".

=== Cleveland Browns ===
After Watson was traded to the Cleveland Browns, the Browns immediately signed Watson to a groundbreaking five-year contract worth $230 million, fully guaranteed—at the time, the largest guaranteed sum in NFL history. However, Watson's debut with the Browns was delayed due to a league-imposed suspension. He was ultimately suspended for 11 games as a result of the numerous sexual assault allegations against him.

Watson's return to NFL play in Week 13 of the 2022 NFL season marked the beginning of a prominent decline in his on-field performance based on in-game statistics. Over the 2022 and 2023 NFL seasons, Watson's statistics placed him among the bottom tier of NFL quarterbacks, with a completion percentage of 59.8% (41st in the NFL for QBs with a minimum of 300 pass attempts in the 2022–2023 seasons), average passing yards per attempt at 6.5 yards (36th in the NFL), and a passer rating of 81.7 (37th in the NFL). In addition, his deep ball efficiency of 20+ yards fell from 43% while with the Texans to 28% since joining the Browns, ranking him 38th out of 45 qualified quarterbacks since 2022.

During the Browns’ 2024 season opener against the Dallas Cowboys, Watson became the first player in 1,752 recorded instances to fail to complete a single pass on ten or more attempts of 15 yards or more downfield in a game, as reported by CBS Sports analyst Zach Pereles. His performance was also compared to former Browns quarterback Baker Mayfield, who achieved several career high statistics in his 2023 season with the Tampa Bay Buccaneers ranking 9th in passing yards and 7th in passing touchdowns among quarterbacks. His performance with the Buccaneers earned him his first Pro Bowl selection and a three-year, $100 million contract extension with the Buccaneers. Mayfield's performance continued to draw comparisons with Watson's during his 2024 season opener, where Mayfield threw for 289 yards and four touchdowns with no interceptions, achieving a passer rating of 146.4— the highest of Week 1.

In the team's first six games of the 2024 season, the Browns struggled to a poor 1–5 record with Watson as their starting quarterback, and his performances in those games prompted several observers to call for Watson's benching. In the team's next game against the Cincinnati Bengals, Watson ruptured his Achilles tendon, marking the second consecutive year he suffered a season-ending injury. A small number of Browns fans were heard cheering as the injury happened out of frustration with Watson's poor play, which drew criticism from players. In January 2025, it was revealed that Watson suffered a second rupture to his right Achilles tendon, which sidelined him for the entire 2025 season.

The Browns traded the 2024 sixth round selection acquired in this trade, along with a 2024 fifth round selection, to the Denver Broncos in exchange for wide receiver Jerry Jeudy. Jeudy led the Browns in receiving yards in 2024 and was selected to the 2025 Pro Bowl Games.

=== Analysis ===
"We took a big swing and miss with Deshaun [...] We thought we had the quarterback, we didn't and we gave up a lot of draft picks to get him. So we've got to dig ourselves out of that hole. [It] was an entire organization decision and it ends with Dee and I, so hold us accountable."

— Jimmy Haslam to reporters in March 2025

The Deshaun Watson trade and subsequent contract was widely criticized as one of the most detrimental personnel decisions in NFL history on the Browns' side, with far-reaching consequences both on and off the field. The acquisition was referred to by CBS Sports as "the single worst transaction in NFL history", stating that the only NFL trade in history that "comes close" was the Minnesota Vikings' infamous trade to receive Herschel Walker from the Dallas Cowboys. They noted that the Browns surrendered significant draft capital, including three first-round picks and three additional selections, but also committed to a record-breaking contract for Watson despite his legal issues.

In 2025, Browns owner Jimmy Haslam called the trade "a big swing and miss" and that he and his wife Dee Haslam should be held accountable. This substantial financial commitment has created severe salary cap constraints for the Browns, particularly for the 2025 and 2026 seasons. The structure of Watson's contract, which lacked flexibility or potential exit routes for the team, is expected to significantly limit the Browns' ability to maneuver in free agency or retain other key players during these years. As a result, many NFL analysts argued that the trade and contract has potentially set the franchise back by several years by hindering their ability to build a well-rounded team through future drafts and free agency signings.

Furthermore, many news outlets and NFL journalists stated that the Browns' decision to acquire Watson has also had significant repercussions for the franchise's public image. By effectively making Watson the "face of their organization" despite the numerous civil lawsuits alleging sexual misconduct, the Browns have faced considerable backlash from fans, media, and advocacy groups. These in turn have led to ongoing public relations challenges for the franchise which has impacted fan support, sponsorships, and the team's standing within the NFL, in Cleveland, and in the nation as a whole.

Additionally, the decision to replace Baker Mayfield, who was just a year removed from leading the Browns to a playoff berth and a win against the Pittsburgh Steelers, with Watson after Mayfield played nearly all of the 2021 NFL season with a shoulder injury, received widespread criticism from Browns fans and the national media. Mayfield's subsequent return to form with the Tampa Bay Buccaneers after the injury has also brought more media criticism against the Browns for their decision.

== See also ==
- Herschel Walker trade
- Jerome Bettis trade
- Ricky Williams trade
- NFL controversies
- Luka Dončić–Anthony Davis trade
