= List of largest NFL trades =

This is a list of the largest National Football League player trades in league history, in terms of the number of players and Draft picks exchanged. In the case of draft picks, names in parentheses indicate the player eventually selected with that pick.

== Trades ==
=== 18 players ===
On October 13, 1989, the Dallas Cowboys, Minnesota Vikings and San Diego Chargers were involved in an 18-player trade, the largest trade in NFL history.

Dallas received:	Minnesota received:	San Diego received:
from Minnesota; CB Issiac Holt; LB David Howard; LB Jesse Solomon; DE Alex Stewart; 1990 first-round pick (made trade with Pittsburgh to draft RB Emmitt Smith); 1990 second-round pick (to San Francisco); 1990 sixth-round pick (to New Orleans); 1991 first-round pick (made trade with New England to draft DT Russell Maryland); 1991 second-round pick (to Houston); 1992 first-round pick (made trade with New England to draft CB Kevin Smith); 1992 second-round pick (to Kansas City); 1992 third-round pick (to New England)	from Dallas; RB Herschel Walker; 1990 third-round pick (LB Mike Jones); 1990 10th-round pick (WR Pat Newman); 1991 third-round pick (WR Jake Reed); from San Diego; 1990 fifth-round pick (WR Reggie Thornton)	from Minnesota; RB Darrin Nelson

=== 15 players ===
The Baltimore Colts and Cleveland Browns swapped 15 players on March 26, 1953.

Baltimore received:	Cleveland received:
QB Harry Agganis; T Dick Batten; E Gern Nagler; DB Bert Rechichar; LB Ed Sharkey; T Stu Sheets; DB Don Shula; G Art Spinney; DB Carl Taseff; G Elmer Willhoite	LB Tom Catlin; DT Don Colo; G Herschell Forester; T Mike McCormack; DB John Petitbon

=== 14 players ===
14 players moved between the Los Angeles Rams and Washington Redskins on January 28, 1971, the opening day of the 1971 NFL draft.

Los Angeles received:	Washington received:
LB Marlin McKeever; 1971 first-round pick (LB Isiah Robertson); 1972 third-round pick (S Dave Elmendorf); 1972 fourth-round pick (LB Joe Federspiel); 1972 fifth-round pick (TE Bob Christiansen); 1972 sixth-round pick (DT Edward Hebert); 1972 seventh-round pick (DT Mike Zikas)	LB Maxie Baughan; RB Jeff Jordan; LB Jack Pardee; LB Myron Pottios; DT Diron Talbert; G John Wilbur; 1971 fifth-round pick (DT Jim Stillwagon)

=== 12 players ===
The Dallas Texans and Los Angeles Rams traded 12 players on June 13, 1952. This was the largest trade by one team for a single player in history, as the Rams traded 11 players for one.

Dallas received:	Los Angeles received:
RB Dave Anderson; RB Billy Baggett; T Jack Halliday; RB Dick Hoerner; DB Tom Keane; FB Dick McKissack; C Aubrey Phillips; C Joe Reid; DB George Sims; LB Vic Vasicek; E Dick Wilkins	Rights to LB/G/K Les Richter (originally drafted by New York Yanks)

=== 10 players ===
The Chicago Cardinals and Los Angeles Rams saw 10 players move on March 23, 1959. This was another "one-for-several" trade, as the Rams sent nine players to Chicago for just one.

Chicago received:	Los Angeles received:
HB Don Brown; T Frank Fuller; DT Art Hauser; FB Larry Hickman; DE Glenn Holtzman; T Ken Panfil; E John Tracey; 1960 second-round pick (OG Mike McGee); Player to be delivered during 1959 training camp	HB Ollie Matson

On October 31, 1987, the Buffalo Bills, Indianapolis Colts and Los Angeles Rams traded 10 players between them.

Buffalo received:	Indianapolis received:	Los Angeles received:
from Indianapolis; Rights to LB Cornelius Bennett	from Los Angeles; RB Eric Dickerson	from Buffalo; RB Greg Bell; 1988 first-round pick (RB Gaston Green); 1989 first-round pick (RB Cleveland Gary); 1989 second-round pick (CB Darryl Henley); from Indianapolis; RB Owen Gill; 1988 first-round pick (WR Aaron Cox); 1988 second-round pick (LB Fred Strickland); 1989 second-round pick (DE Frank Stams)

== See also ==
- National Football League
- NFL draft
