= 1993–94 Ottawa Senators season =

Ice hockey team season

1993–94 Ottawa Senators
- Division: 7th Northeast
- Conference: 14th Eastern
- 1993–94 record: 14–61–9
- Home record: 8–30–4
- Road record: 6–31–5
- Goals for: 201
- Goals against: 397

Team information
- General manager: Randy Sexton
- Coach: Rick Bowness
- Captain: Mark Lamb (Oct–Mar); Brad Shaw (Oct–Mar); Gord Dineen (Mar–Apr)
- Alternate captains: Norm MacIver
- Arena: Ottawa Civic Centre
- Average attendance: 10,300
- Minor league affiliates: Prince Edward Island Senators; Thunder Bay Senators

Team leaders
- Goals: Alexei Yashin (30)
- Assists: Alexei Yashin (49)
- Points: Alexei Yashin (79)
- Penalty minutes: Dennis Vial (214)
- Plus/minus: Troy Murray (+1)
- Wins: Craig Billington (11)
- Goals against average: Darrin Madeley (4.36)

The 1993–94 Ottawa Senators season was the National Hockey League (NHL) club's second season. It was an improvement by the club, as they finished with 13 more points than in the 1992–93 expansion season, as the club ended the season with a 14–61–9 record for 37 points. Even so, they had the worst record in hockey for the second consecutive year. As of 2026, they are the most recent team to finish with 60 or more losses in a season.

== Off-season ==
On April 15, 1993, one day after the end of the 1992–93 season, general manager Mel Bridgman was fired. Randy Sexton became the general manager. Sexton would select Alexandre Daigle first overall in the 1993 NHL entry draft. On May 12, head coach Rick Bowness' contract was extended by three years.

On August 17, 1993, the Bruce Firestone era ended. Firestone sold his shares to Rod Bryden and resigned as chairman and governor of the Senators.

== Regular season ==
Northeast Division teams

The Senators finished last in wins (14), losses (61) and points (37), goals for (201), goals against (397), even-strength goals against (273), power-play goals against (110), penalty-kill percentage (73.30%) and shutouts for (0).

Alexei Yashin, the Senators first pick in the 1992 NHL entry draft, had a rookie season, setting records with 30 goals, 49 assists, and 79 points. Alexandre Daigle, whom the Senators drafted with the first overall pick in the 1993 NHL entry draft, also had a rookie season, recording 20 goals, 31 assists and 51 points to finish second to Yashin in team scoring.

Midway through the season, the Senators traded Bob Kudelski, who was having the best season on the team, registering 41 points (26 goals and 15 assists) in 42 games, to the Florida Panthers for Evgeny Davydov and Scott Levins. The trade hurt the Senators as Davydov struggled with the team, while Levins production also dropped after the deal.

Craig Billington played the majority of games in the Senators net, as he was acquired from the New Jersey Devils in a deal that sent Peter Sidorkiewicz to New Jersey, and Billington set the team record for wins in a season with 11.

=== Final standings ===
Northeast Division
No.	CR		GP	W	L	T	GF	GA	Pts
1	2	**Pittsburgh Penguins**	84	44	27	13	299	285	101
2	4	**Boston Bruins**	84	42	29	13	289	252	97
3	5	**Montreal Canadiens**	84	41	29	14	283	248	96
4	6	**Buffalo Sabres**	84	43	32	9	282	218	95
5	11	Quebec Nordiques	84	34	42	8	277	292	76
6	13	Hartford Whalers	84	27	48	9	227	288	63
7	14	Ottawa Senators	84	14	61	9	201	397	37

Note: No. = Division rank, CR = Conference rank, W = Wins, L = Losses, T = Ties, GF = Goals For, GA = Goals Against, Pts = Points
Teams that qualified for the playoffs are highlighted in bold.

Eastern Conference
R		GP	W	L	T	GF	GA	Pts
**1**	**p-New York Rangers ***	**84**	**52**	**24**	**8**	**299**	**231**	**112**
**2**	**x-Pittsburgh Penguins ***	**84**	**44**	**27**	**13**	**299**	**285**	**101**
**3**	**New Jersey Devils**	**84**	**47**	**25**	**12**	**306**	**220**	**106**
**4**	**Boston Bruins**	**84**	**42**	**29**	**13**	**289**	**252**	**97**
**5**	**Montreal Canadiens**	**84**	**41**	**29**	**14**	**283**	**248**	**96**
**6**	**Buffalo Sabres**	**84**	**43**	**32**	**9**	**282**	**218**	**95**
**7**	**Washington Capitals**	**84**	**39**	**35**	**10**	**277**	**263**	**88**
**8**	**New York Islanders**	**84**	**36**	**36**	**12**	**282**	**264**	**84**
9	Florida Panthers	84	33	34	17	233	233	83
10	Philadelphia Flyers	84	35	39	10	294	314	80
11	Quebec Nordiques	84	34	42	8	277	292	76
12	Tampa Bay Lightning	84	30	43	11	224	251	71
13	Hartford Whalers	84	27	48	9	227	288	63
14	Ottawa Senators	84	14	61	9	201	397	37

Final standings

bold – Qualified for playoffs; x – Won division; p – Won Presidents' Trophy (and division); * – Division leader

=== Schedule and results ===
1993–94 regular season
October: 2–6–2 (home: 1–2–1; road: 1–4–1)

Game	Date	Score	Opponent	Record	Attendance	Recap
1	October 6, 1993	5–5 OT	Quebec Nordiques (1993–94)	0–0–1	10,525	T
2	October 9, 1993	5–7	@ St. Louis Blues (1993–94)	0–1–1	12,132	L
3	October 14, 1993	4–5	@ Florida Panthers (1993–94)	0–2–1	13,906	L
4	October 16, 1993	1–4	@ Tampa Bay Lightning (1993–94)	0–3–1	18,238	L
5	October 21, 1993	5–6 OT	Dallas Stars (1993–94)	0–4–1	10,078	L
6	October 23, 1993	5–5 OT	@ New York Islanders (1993–94)	0–4–2	9,423	T
7	October 25, 1993	4–1	Mighty Ducks of Anaheim (1993–94)	1–4–2	10,206	W
8	October 27, 1993	2–5	Philadelphia Flyers (1993–94)	1–5–2	10,547	L
9	October 28, 1993	2–6	@ Boston Bruins (1993–94)	1–6–2	12,637	L
10	October 30, 1993	5–4 OT	@ Dallas Stars (1993–94)	2–6–2	16,211	W

November: 3–9–1 (home: 0–7–0; road: 3–2–1)

Game	Date	Score	Opponent	Record	Attendance	Recap
11	November 3, 1993	7–5	@ Edmonton Oilers (1993–94)	3–6–2	11,382	W
12	November 5, 1993	7–6 OT	@ Winnipeg Jets (1993–94)	4–6–2	12,652	W
13	November 10, 1993	3–4 OT	@ Hartford Whalers (1993–94)	4–7–2	7,232	L
14	November 11, 1993	4–5	Florida Panthers (1993–94)	4–8–2	10,227	L
15	November 13, 1993	3–2 OT	@ Montreal Canadiens (1993–94)	5–8–2	16,903	W
16	November 15, 1993	2–4	Montreal Canadiens (1993–94)	5–9–2	10,575	L
17	November 17, 1993	1–8	New York Islanders (1993–94)	5–10–2	10,132	L
18	November 18, 1993	2–5	New Jersey Devils (1993–94)	5–11–2	10,122	L
19	November 22, 1993	2–5	Buffalo Sabres (1993–94)	5–12–2	10,155	L
20	November 24, 1993	1–7	New York Rangers (1993–94)	5–13–2	10,411	L
21	November 26, 1993	2–5	@ Buffalo Sabres (1993–94)	5–14–2	14,648	L
22	November 27, 1993	2–2 OT	@ Pittsburgh Penguins (1993–94)	5–14–3	17,537	T
23	November 29, 1993	2–4	Hartford Whalers (1993–94)	5–15–3	10,075	L

December: 3–13–0 (home: 2–6–0; road: 1–7–0)

Game	Date	Score	Opponent	Record	Attendance	Recap
24	December 1, 1993	6–3	@ Montreal Canadiens (1993–94)	6–15–3	16,242	W
25	December 3, 1993	1–8	@ Detroit Red Wings (1993–94)	6–16–3	19,875	L
26	December 4, 1993	1–6	Washington Capitals (1993–94)	6–17–3	10,435	L
27	December 6, 1993	1–6	Calgary Flames (1993–94)	6–18–3	10,338	L
28	December 8, 1993	1–3	Buffalo Sabres (1993–94)	6–19–3	10,111	L
29	December 9, 1993	1–6	@ Dallas Stars (1993–94)	6–20–3	14,058	L
30	December 11, 1993	2–5	@ Quebec Nordiques (1993–94)	6–21–3	14,707	L
31	December 13, 1993	5–2	Los Angeles Kings (1993–94)	7–21–3	10,575	W
32	December 15, 1993	3–4	@ Tampa Bay Lightning (1993–94)	7–22–3	16,155	L
33	December 17, 1993	2–11	@ Washington Capitals (1993–94)	7–23–3	15,189	L
34	December 19, 1993	3–6	@ New York Rangers (1993–94)	7–24–3	17,935	L
35	December 21, 1993	2–1	Quebec Nordiques (1993–94)	8–24–3	10,503	W
36	December 23, 1993	1–2	Hartford Whalers (1993–94)	8–25–3	10,357	L
37	December 26, 1993	2–3 OT	@ Hartford Whalers (1993–94)	8–26–3	10,825	L
38	December 27, 1993	3–5	Boston Bruins (1993–94)	8–27–3	10,575	L
39	December 30, 1993	0–3	Tampa Bay Lightning (1993–94)	8–28–3	10,504	L

January: 1–9–4 (home: 1–5–2; road: 0–4–2)

Game	Date	Score	Opponent	Record	Attendance	Recap
40	January 1, 1994	1–7	New Jersey Devils (1993–94)	8–29–3	10,317	L
41	January 3, 1994	1–4	Pittsburgh Penguins (1993–94)	8–30–3	10,474	L
42	January 5, 1994	2–7	Vancouver Canucks (1993–94)	8–31–3	10,288	L
43	January 6, 1994	3–6	@ Toronto Maple Leafs (1993–94)	8–32–3	15,728	L
44	January 8, 1994	2–3	Winnipeg Jets (1993–94)	8–33–3	10,378	L
45	January 10, 1994	3–3 OT	New York Islanders (1993–94)	8–33–4	10,275	T
46	January 11, 1994	1–4	@ Philadelphia Flyers (1993–94)	8–34–4	17,212	L
47	January 14, 1994	2–2 OT	@ Vancouver Canucks (1993–94)	8–34–5	14,458	T
48	January 15, 1994	0–10	@ Calgary Flames (1993–94)	8–35–5	19,366	L
49	January 18, 1994	4–3 OT	Edmonton Oilers (1993–94)	9–35–5	10,410	W
50	January 25, 1994	2–4	@ Pittsburgh Penguins (1993–94)	9–36–5	15,121	L
51	January 27, 1994	1–1 OT	Hartford Whalers (1993–94)	9–36–6	10,137	T
52	January 29, 1994	3–3 OT	@ Chicago Blackhawks (1993–94)	9–36–7	18,041	T
53	January 31, 1994	0–1	Chicago Blackhawks (1993–94)	9–37–7	10,534	L

February: 1–9–1 (home: 1–6–1; road: 0–3–0)

Game	Date	Score	Opponent	Record	Attendance	Recap
54	February 2, 1994	1–4	Florida Panthers (1993–94)	9–38–7	10,186	L
55	February 4, 1994	2–5	@ New Jersey Devils (1993–94)	9–39–7	12,861	L
56	February 5, 1994	3–4	Montreal Canadiens (1993–94)	9–40–7	10,575	L
57	February 8, 1994	3–3 OT	Philadelphia Flyers (1993–94)	9–40–8	10,509	T
58	February 10, 1994	2–6	Tampa Bay Lightning (1993–94)	9–41–8	10,295	L
59	February 12, 1994	3–4 OT	New York Rangers (1993–94)	9–42–8	10,575	L
60	February 18, 1994	0–3	@ New York Rangers (1993–94)	9–43–8	18,200	L
61	February 19, 1994	0–4	@ New York Islanders (1993–94)	9–44–8	10,623	L
62	February 24, 1994	6–4	San Jose Sharks (1993–94)	10–44–8	10,403	W
63	February 26, 1994	1–11	St. Louis Blues (1993–94)	10–45–8	10,575	L
64	February 28, 1994	1–4	Toronto Maple Leafs (1993–94)	10–46–8	10,575	L

March: 3–10–0 (home: 2–2–0; road: 1–8–0)

Game	Date	Score	Opponent	Record	Attendance	Recap
65	March 2, 1994	2–7	Buffalo Sabres (1993–94)	10–47–8	10,404	L
66	March 4, 1994	1–6	Winnipeg Jets (1993–94)	10–48–8	6,388	L
67	March 5, 1994	1–6	@ Boston Bruins (1993–94)	10–49–8	14,135	L
68	March 8, 1994	2–5	@ Quebec Nordiques (1993–94)	10–50–8	14,584	L
69	March 10, 1994	2–8	@ Philadelphia Flyers (1993–94)	10–51–8	17,000	L
70	March 13, 1994	1–5	@ Mighty Ducks of Anaheim (1993–94)	10–52–8	17,174	L
71	March 15, 1994	0–7	@ Los Angeles Kings (1993–94)	10–53–8	16,005	L
72	March 17, 1994	2–1	@ San Jose Sharks (1993–94)	11–53–8	17,190	W
73	March 20, 1994	2–6	@ Buffalo Sabres (1993–94)	11–54–8	14,135	L
74	March 23, 1994	5–4	Detroit Red Wings (1993–94)	12–54–8	10,575	W
75	March 24, 1994	1–5	@ Pittsburgh Penguins (1993–94)	12–55–8	16,058	L
76	March 28, 1994	2–3	@ Montreal Canadiens (1993–94)	12–56–8	16,643	L
77	March 30, 1994	6–4	Quebec Nordiques (1993–94)	13–56–8	10,546	W

April: 1–5–1 (home: 1–2–0; road: 0–3–1)

Game	Date	Score	Opponent	Record	Attendance	Recap
78	April 2, 1994	2–2 OT	@ Florida Panthers (1993–94)	13–56–9	14,694	T
79	April 6, 1994	6–5	Washington Capitals (1993–94)	14–56–9	10,458	W
80	April 7, 1994	4–5	@ Boston Bruins (1993–94)	14–57–9	13,942	L
81	April 9, 1994	4–8	@ Washington Capitals (1993–94)	14–58–9	17,412	L
82	April 11, 1994	0–4	Pittsburgh Penguins (1993–94)	14–59–9	10,575	L
83	April 13, 1994	0–8	Boston Bruins (1993–94)	14–60–9	10,575	L
84	April 14, 1994	1–4	@ New Jersey Devils (1993–94)	14–61–9	13,507	L

**Legend**: W Win (2 points) L Loss (0 points) T Tie (1 point)

== Player statistics ==
=== Regular season ===
Scoring

Player	Pos	GP	G	A	Pts	PIM	+/-	PPG	SHG	GWG
Alexei Yashin	C	83	30	49	79	22	−49	11	2	3
Alexandre Daigle	C	84	20	31	51	40	−45	4	0	2
Dave McLlwain	C/RW	66	17	26	43	48	−40	1	1	1
Bob Kudelski	RW	42	26	15	41	14	−25	12	0	1
Mark Lamb	C	66	11	18	29	56	−41	4	1	1
Sylvain Turgeon	LW	47	11	15	26	52	−25	7	0	2
Troy Mallette	LW	82	7	16	23	166	−33	0	0	0
Brad Shaw	D	66	4	19	23	59	−41	1	0	0
Norm Maciver	D	53	3	20	23	26	−26	0	0	0
Gord Dineen	D	77	0	21	21	89	−52	0	0	0
Andrew McBain	RW	55	11	8	19	64	−41	8	0	0
Dave Archibald	C/LW	33	10	8	18	14	−7	2	0	1
Vladimir Ruzicka	C	42	5	13	18	14	−21	4	0	0
Darren Rumble	D	70	6	9	15	116	−50	0	0	0
Brian Glynn	D	48	2	13	15	41	−15	1	0	0
Evgeny Davydov	LW	40	5	7	12	38	−6	1	0	0
Kerry Huffman	D	34	4	8	12	12	−30	2	1	0
Scott Levins	C/RW	33	3	5	8	93	−26	2	0	0
Dan Quinn	C	13	7	0	7	6	0	2	0	3
Brad Lauer	LW	30	2	5	7	6	−15	0	1	0
Dennis Vial	D/LW	55	2	5	7	214	−9	0	0	0
Jarmo Kekäläinen	LW	28	1	5	6	14	−8	0	0	0
Phil Bourque	LW	11	2	3	5	0	−2	0	2	0
Robert Burakovsky	RW	23	2	3	5	6	−7	0	0	0
Troy Murray	C	15	2	3	5	4	1	0	1	0
Dmitri Filimonov	D	30	1	4	5	18	−10	0	0	0
Bill Huard	LW	63	2	2	4	162	−19	0	0	0
Derek Mayer	D	17	2	2	4	8	−16	1	0	0
Hank Lammens	D	27	1	2	3	22	−20	0	0	0
Darcy Loewen	LW	44	0	3	3	52	−11	0	0	0
Pavol Demitra	LW	12	1	1	2	4	−7	1	0	0
Steve Konroyd	D	8	0	2	2	2	−4	0	0	0
Claude Boivin	LW	15	1	0	1	38	−6	0	0	0
Francois Leroux	D	23	0	1	1	70	−4	0	0	0
Kent Paynter	D	9	0	1	1	8	−6	0	0	0
Daniel Berthiaume	G	1	0	0	0	0	0	0	0	0
Craig Billington	G	63	0	0	0	8	0	0	0	0
Radek Hamr	D	7	0	0	0	0	−10	0	0	0
Mark LaForest	G	5	0	0	0	0	0	0	0	0
Kevin MacDonald	D	1	0	0	0	2	0	0	0	0
Darrin Madeley	G	32	0	0	0	0	0	0	0	0
Greg Pankewicz	RW	3	0	0	0	2	−1	0	0	0
Chad Penney	LW	3	0	0	0	2	−2	0	0	0
Herb Raglan	RW	29	0	0	0	52	−13	0	0	0
Andy Schneider	LW	10	0	0	0	15	−6	0	0	0
Graeme Townshend	RW	14	0	0	0	9	−7	0	0	0

Goaltending

Player	MIN	GP	W	L	T	GA	GAA	SO	SA	SV	SV%
Craig Billington	3319	63	11	41	4	254	4.59	0	1801	1547	.859
Darrin Madeley	1583	32	3	18	5	115	4.36	0	868	753	.868
Daniel Berthiaume	1	1	0	0	0	2	120.00	0	2	0	.000
Mark LaForest	182	5	0	2	0	17	5.60	0	96	79	.823
Team:	5085	84	14	61	9	388	4.58	0	2767	2379	.860

Note:

Pos = Position;GP = Games played; G = Goals; A = Assists; Pts = Points; PIM = Penalty minutes; +/- = Plus/minus; PPG = Power-play goals; SHG = Short-handed goals; GWG = Game-winning goals
Pos = Position;GP = Games played; Min, TOI = Minutes played; W = Wins; L = Losses; T,T/OT = Ties; OTL = Overtime losses; GA = Goals-against; GAA = Goals-against average; SO = Shutouts; SA = Shots against; SV = Shots saved;SV% = Save percentage;

== Awards and records ==
- Molson Cup – Alexei Yashin
- NHL All-Star Game selection – Alexei Yashin
- 1994 Olympic Games selection – Derek Mayer (Canada)

== Transactions ==
=== May 1993 ===
May 7	Acquired the rights of Robert Burakovsky from the New York Rangers for future considerations (11th-round pick in the 1993 NHL entry draft - (Pavel Komarov)).
May 27	Signed free agent Greg Pankewicz from the New Haven Senators of the AHL.

=== June 1993 ===
June 20	Acquired Craig Billington, Troy Mallette and a 4th-round pick in the 1993 NHL entry draft - (Cosmo Dupaul) from the New Jersey Devils for Peter Sidorkiewicz, Mike Peluso and a 5th-round pick in the 1994 NHL entry draft - (Nils Ekman).
June 24	Lost Marc Labelle to the Florida Panthers and Mark Ferner to the Mighty Ducks of Anaheim in the 1993 NHL expansion draft.
June 25	Signed free agent Hank Lammens from the Canadian National Team. Selected Dennis Vial from the Mighty Ducks of Anaheim in Phase II of the 1993 NHL expansion draft.
June 26	Signed Alexandre Daigle to a 5-year, $12.25 million (CAD) contract.
June 30	Signed free agent Bill Huard from the Boston Bruins. Acquired the rights to Jeff Finley from the New York Islanders for Chris Luongo.

=== July 1993 ===
July 30	Lost free agent Jeff Finley to the Philadelphia Flyers. Lost unrestricted free agent Shawn McCosh to the New York Rangers.

=== August 1993 ===
August 2	Lost free agent Rob Murphy to the Los Angeles Kings.
August 10	Lost free agent Jody Hull to the Florida Panthers and Mark Freer to the Calgary Flames.
August 12	Signed free agent Vladimír Růžička from the Boston Bruins to a 1-year, $425,000 (CAD) contract.
August 13	Signed free agent Jarmo Kekäläinen from Tappara of SM-I to a 1-year, $200,000 (CAD) contract.
August 18	Lost free agent Jamie Baker to the San Jose Sharks.
August 24	Signed free agent Graeme Townshend from the New York Islanders to a 1-year contract.

=== September 1993 ===
September 15	Acquired Brian Glynn from the Edmonton Oilers for an 8th-round pick in the 1994 NHL entry draft - (Rob Guinn)

=== October 1993 ===
October 3	Claimed Dave McLlwain from the Toronto Maple Leafs in the 1993 NHL waiver draft.
October 6	Claimed François Leroux from the Edmonton Oilers off waivers.

=== December 1993 ===
December 22	Signed free agent Kevin MacDonald from the PEI Senators (AHL) to a 1-year contract.

=== January 1994 ===
January 1	Signed free agent Herb Raglan from the Kalamazoo Wings (IHL) to a 1-year, $250,000 (CAD) contract.
January 3	Signed free agent Brad Lauer from the Las Vegas Thunder (IHL) to a 1-year contract.
January 6	Acquired Scott Levins, Evgeny Davydov, 6th-round pick in the 1994 NHL entry draft - (Mike Gaffney) and a 4th-round pick in the 1995 NHL entry draft - (Kevin Bolibruck from the Florida Panthers for Bob Kudelski.
January 15	Claimed Kerry Huffman from the Quebec Nordiques off of waivers.

=== February 1994 ===
February 5	Lost Brian Glynn off of waivers by the Vancouver Canucks.

=== March 1994 ===
March 4	Signed free agent Derek Mayer from the Canadian National Team to a 1-year contract.
March 5	Acquired Claude Boivin and the rights to Kirk Daubenspeck from the Philadelphia Flyers for Mark Lamb.
March 11	Acquired Troy Murray and an 11th-round pick in the 1994 NHL entry draft - (Antti Tormanen) from the Chicago Blackhawks for an 11th-round pick in the 1994 NHL entry draft - (Rob Mara).
March 21	Acquired Phil Bourque from the New York Rangers for future considerations. Acquired Steve Konroyd from the Detroit Red Wings for Daniel Berthiaume.

== Draft picks ==
Ottawa's draft picks at the 1993 NHL entry draft in Quebec City, Quebec.

Round	#	Player	Nationality	College/Junior/Club team (League)
1	1	Alexandre Daigle	Canada	Victoriaville Tigres (QMJHL)
2	27	Radim Bicanek	Czech Republic	Dukla Jihlava (Czech.)
3	53	Patrick Charbonneau	Canada	Victoriaville Tigres (QMJHL)
4	91	Cosmo DuPaul	Canada	Victoriaville Tigres (QMJHL)
6	131	Rick Bodkin	Canada	Sudbury Wolves (OHL)
7	157	Sergei Polischuk	Russia	Krylja Sovetov (Russia)
8	183	Jason Disher	Canada	Kingston Frontenacs (OHL)
9	209	Toby Kvalevog	United States	University of North Dakota (NCAA)
9	227	Pavol Demitra	Slovakia	Dukla Trencin (Czech.)
10	235	Rick Schuhwerk	United States	Hingham High School (US HS)
S	1	Eric Flinton	Canada	University of New Hampshire (Hockey East)

== Farm teams ==
=== Prince Edward Islanders Senators ===
The Senators moved their American Hockey League affiliate from New Haven to Charlottetown and renamed the team to the Prince Edward Island Senators beginning in the 1993–94 season. Don MacAdam remained the head coach of the club.

PEI finished in last place in the Atlantic Division with a 23–49–8 record, earning 54 points, failing to qualify for the post-season. Greg Pankewicz led the club with 33 goals, while Robert Burakovsky had a team-high 67 points. Mark Laforest led the team with nine wins and a 4.09 GAA.

=== Thunder Bay Senators ===
The Senators announced that their Colonial Hockey League affiliate would be renamed from the Thunder Hawks to the Thunder Bay Senators beginning in the 1993–94 season. Bill McDonald remained the head coach of the team.

Thunder Bay finished in first place in the East Division, earning a record of 45–15–4 for 94 points. Gerry St. Cyr scored a team-high 50 goals, finishing second in the league in goals, and 113 points, placing him third in the Colonial Hockey League in points. Jean-François Labbé led the league with 35 wins and had a team best 3.10 GAA. In the post-season, the Senators defeated the Brantford Smoke and Chatham Wheels to win the championship. Terry Menard and Todd Howarth co-led the team in the post-season with seven goals, while Menard had a team-high 15 points. Labbé earned seven playoff wins and had a 2.19 GAA.

== See also ==
- 1993–94 NHL season
