= 1993–94 Philadelphia Flyers season =

Ice hockey team season

1993–94 Philadelphia Flyers
- Division: 6th Atlantic
- Conference: 10th Eastern
- 1993–94 record: 35–39–10
- Home record: 19–20–3
- Road record: 16–19–7
- Goals for: 294
- Goals against: 314

Team information
- General manager: Russ Farwell
- Coach: Terry Simpson
- Captain: Kevin Dineen
- Alternate captains: Dave Brown; Garry Galley; Eric Lindros
- Arena: Spectrum
- Average attendance: 17,231
- Minor league affiliates: Hershey Bears; Johnstown Chiefs

Team leaders
- Goals: Eric Lindros (44)
- Assists: Mark Recchi (67)
- Points: Mark Recchi (107)
- Penalty minutes: Dave Brown (137)
- Plus/minus: Jeff Finley (+16); Eric Lindros (+16)
- Wins: Dominic Roussel (29)
- Goals against average: Dominic Roussel (3.34)

The 1993–94 Philadelphia Flyers season was the franchise's 27th season in the National Hockey League (NHL). For the fifth consecutive season, the Flyers failed to make the playoffs, the last time this would occur until the 2024–25 season.

== Off-season ==
On May 24, the Flyers announced that Terry Simpson was replacing Bill Dineen as head coach. Mike Eaves was hired to replace Ken Hitchcock, who left to become the head coach of the Kalamazoo Wings of the International Hockey League, as an assistant coach. Simpson named Kevin Dineen captain and made Eric Lindros an alternate captain to groom him for a leadership role.

== Regular season ==
This season began on a brighter note, as the club raced out to an 11–3–0 record. A loss to the Toronto Maple Leafs at Maple Leaf Gardens on November 6 signaled a sharp downturn, however. Lindros went down with his second knee injury in as many years and soon after, the Penguins routed the Flyers 11–5 in Pittsburgh.

Other lowlights on the slide included a 6–0 loss in Calgary, and an 8–0 defeat in the club's first-ever road game against the Dallas Stars in early January. Lindros netted an impressive hat-trick in an 8–3 win over the Blues later in the month, but an 0–6–1 slide placed the team out of playoff contention.

Despite Simpson's efforts to employ a defensive system akin to the yet-to-be unleashed neutral zone trap, the team continued to crack with Dominic Roussel and Tommy Soderstrom in net. Soderstrom struggled with heart ailments and bad luck all season, winning just six games. After climbing within three points of eighth-seeded Washington in late March, the Flyers finished the year 2–5–3 and rested in sixth place in the Atlantic Division, three points behind the expansion Florida Panthers.

Mark Recchi recorded 107 points (40 goals, 67 assists) and Lindros 97 (44 goals, 53 assists). Rod Brind'Amour improved with another 97 (35 goals, 62 assists) and Mikael Renberg set a Flyers rookie record with 82 points. Philadelphia had the best shooting percentage of all 26 teams, scoring 294 goals on 2,409 shots (12.2%). Offense was generated as the Flyers had four 30-goal scorers for the second-straight season and averaged 3.5 goals per game, but they still failed to clinch a playoff berth, again falling four points short of the final playoff spot.

After the season, Ed Snider had decided he had seen enough of Russ Farwell as general manager, and began courting Bobby Clarke to leave his GM post with the Florida Panthers to return to Philadelphia. Farwell's last move was firing Simpson after a lackluster season.

=== Season standings ===
Atlantic Division
No.	CR		GP	W	L	T	GF	GA	Pts
1	1	**New York Rangers**	84	52	24	8	299	231	112
2	3	**New Jersey Devils**	84	47	25	12	306	220	106
3	7	**Washington Capitals**	84	39	35	10	277	263	88
4	8	**New York Islanders**	84	36	36	12	282	264	84
5	9	Florida Panthers	84	33	34	17	233	233	83
6	10	Philadelphia Flyers	84	35	39	10	294	314	80
7	12	Tampa Bay Lightning	84	30	43	11	224	251	71

Note: No. = Division rank, CR = Conference rank, W = Wins, L = Losses, T = Ties, GF = Goals For, GA = Goals Against, Pts = Points
Teams that qualified for the playoffs are highlighted in bold.

Eastern Conference
R		GP	W	L	T	GF	GA	Pts
**1**	**p-New York Rangers ***	**84**	**52**	**24**	**8**	**299**	**231**	**112**
**2**	**x-Pittsburgh Penguins ***	**84**	**44**	**27**	**13**	**299**	**285**	**101**
**3**	**New Jersey Devils**	**84**	**47**	**25**	**12**	**306**	**220**	**106**
**4**	**Boston Bruins**	**84**	**42**	**29**	**13**	**289**	**252**	**97**
**5**	**Montreal Canadiens**	**84**	**41**	**29**	**14**	**283**	**248**	**96**
**6**	**Buffalo Sabres**	**84**	**43**	**32**	**9**	**282**	**218**	**95**
**7**	**Washington Capitals**	**84**	**39**	**35**	**10**	**277**	**263**	**88**
**8**	**New York Islanders**	**84**	**36**	**36**	**12**	**282**	**264**	**84**
9	Florida Panthers	84	33	34	17	233	233	83
10	Philadelphia Flyers	84	35	39	10	294	314	80
11	Quebec Nordiques	84	34	42	8	277	292	76
12	Tampa Bay Lightning	84	30	43	11	224	251	71
13	Hartford Whalers	84	27	48	9	227	288	63
14	Ottawa Senators	84	14	61	9	201	397	37

Final standings

bold – Qualified for playoffs; x – Won division; p – Won Presidents' Trophy (and division); * – Division leader

== Schedule and results ==
1993–94 regular season
October: 9–3–0, 18 points (home: 4–2–0; road: 5–1–0)

Game	Date	Score	Opponent	Decision	Record	Points	Recap
1	October 5	4–3	Pittsburgh Penguins	Roussel	1–0–0	2	W
2	October 9	5–2	@ Hartford Whalers	Roussel	2–0–0	4	W
3	October 10	4–5	Toronto Maple Leafs	Soderstrom	2–1–0	4	L
4	October 12	5–3	Buffalo Sabres	Roussel	3–1–0	6	W
5	October 15	3–0	@ Washington Capitals	Roussel	4–1–0	8	W
6	October 16	4–3	New York Rangers	Roussel	5–1–0	10	W
7	October 22	4–3	New York Islanders	Roussel	6–1–0	12	W
8	October 23	6–9	Winnipeg Jets	Soderstrom	6–2–0	12	L
9	October 26	4–2	@ Quebec Nordiques	Roussel	7–2–0	14	W
10	October 27	5–2	@ Ottawa Senators	Roussel	8–2–0	16	W
11	October 30	3–5	@ New Jersey Devils	Roussel	8–3–0	16	L
12	October 31	9–6	@ Chicago Blackhawks	Roussel	9–3–0	18	W

November: 7–6–1, 15 points (home: 4–4–0; road: 3–2–1)

Game	Date	Score	Opponent	Decision	Record	Points	Recap
13	November 2	4–3	@ Florida Panthers	Roussel	10–3–0	20	W
14	November 4	4–1	Quebec Nordiques	Roussel	11–3–0	22	W
15	November 6	3–5	@ Toronto Maple Leafs	Roussel	11–4–0	22	L
16	November 7	2–5	Vancouver Canucks	Roussel	11–5–0	22	L
17	November 10	5–3	@ Buffalo Sabres	Roussel	12–5–0	24	W
18	November 11	3–5	New Jersey Devils	Roussel	12–6–0	24	L
19	November 13	2–7	Buffalo Sabres	Roussel	12–7–0	24	L
20	November 16	5–11	@ Pittsburgh Penguins	Soderstrom	12–8–0	24	L
21	November 18	6–3	Hartford Whalers	Roussel	13–8–0	26	W
22	November 20	5–5 OT	@ Boston Bruins	Soderstrom	13–8–1	27	T
23	November 21	4–5 OT	New York Islanders	Roussel	13–9–1	27	L
24	November 24	9–2	Montreal Canadiens	Soderstrom	14–9–1	29	W
25	November 26	3–0	Tampa Bay Lightning	Soderstrom	15–9–1	31	W
26	November 27	4–3 OT	@ Tampa Bay Lightning	Roussel	16–9–1	33	W

December: 4–8–2, 10 points (home: 1–4–1; road: 3–4–1)

Game	Date	Score	Opponent	Decision	Record	Points	Recap
27	December 1	1–3	@ Edmonton Oilers	Soderstrom	16–10–1	33	L
28	December 2	6–3	@ Vancouver Canucks	Roussel	17–10–1	35	W
29	December 4	0–6	@ Calgary Flames	Soderstrom	17–11–1	35	L
30	December 9	2–4	Washington Capitals	Roussel	17–12–1	35	L
31	December 11	2–5	@ New York Islanders	Soderstrom	17–13–1	35	L
32	December 12	1–2	Edmonton Oilers	Roussel	17–14–1	35	L
33	December 16	3–2	Quebec Nordiques	Roussel	18–14–1	37	W
34	December 18	2–2 OT	Chicago Blackhawks	Soderstrom	18–14–2	38	T
35	December 19	2–4	@ New Jersey Devils	Roussel	18–15–2	38	L
36	December 21	1–4	Washington Capitals	Soderstrom	18–16–2	38	L
37	December 23	1–3	Detroit Red Wings	Soderstrom	18–17–2	38	L
38	December 27	2–0	@ Buffalo Sabres	Soderstrom	19–17–2	40	W
39	December 28	4–4 OT	@ Pittsburgh Penguins	Roussel	19–17–3	41	T
40^{[a]}	December 31	4–3	@ Boston Bruins	Roussel	20–17–3	43	W
Notes:^{a} Neutral site game played at the Met Center in Bloomington, Minnesota.

January: 4–6–0, 8 points (home: 4–1–0; road: 0–5–0)

Game	Date	Score	Opponent	Decision	Record	Points	Recap
41	January 6	0–8	@ Dallas Stars	Roussel	20–18–3	43	L
42	January 8	2–4	@ Tampa Bay Lightning	Soderstrom	20–19–3	43	L
43	January 11	4–1	Ottawa Senators	Roussel	21–19–3	45	W
44	January 13	6–2	Boston Bruins	Roussel	22–19–3	47	W
45	January 14	2–5	@ New York Rangers	Soderstrom	22–20–3	47	L
46	January 16	5–2	Los Angeles Kings	Roussel	23–20–3	49	W
47	January 19	8–3	St. Louis Blues	Roussel	24–20–3	51	W
48	January 25	4–6	@ Quebec Nordiques	Roussel	24–21–3	51	L
49	January 29	2–4	Washington Capitals	Roussel	24–22–3	51	L
50	January 30	4–5 OT	@ Montreal Canadiens	Soderstrom	24–23–3	51	L

February: 5–8–1, 11 points (home: 3–3–0; road: 2–5–1)

Game	Date	Score	Opponent	Decision	Record	Points	Recap
51^{[b]}	February 2	2–5	Washington Capitals	Roussel	24–24–3	51	L
52	February 3	2–3 OT	San Jose Sharks	Roussel	24–25–3	51	L
53	February 5	0–4	@ Boston Bruins	Roussel	24–26–3	51	L
54	February 8	3–3 OT	@ Ottawa Senators	Roussel	24–26–4	52	T
55	February 10	4–3 OT	Florida Panthers	Roussel	25–26–4	54	W
56	February 11	3–6	@ Detroit Red Wings	Soderstrom	25–27–4	54	L
57	February 13	0–3	Pittsburgh Penguins	Roussel	25–28–4	54	L
58	February 15	6–4	@ San Jose Sharks	Roussel	26–28–4	56	W
59	February 16	3–6	@ Mighty Ducks of Anaheim	Roussel	26–29–4	56	L
60	February 18	4–3	@ Los Angeles Kings	Roussel	27–29–4	58	W
61	February 21	8–7	Montreal Canadiens	Roussel	28–29–4	60	W
62	February 24	5–4 OT	New York Islanders	Roussel	29–29–4	62	W
63	February 25	0–2	@ New York Islanders	Roussel	29–30–4	62	L
64	February 28	1–4	@ New York Rangers	Roussel	29–31–4	62	L
Notes:^{b} Neutral site game played at the Richfield Coliseum in Richfield Township, Ohio.

March: 4–7–3, 11 points (home: 2–5–1; road: 2–2–2)

Game	Date	Score	Opponent	Decision	Record	Points	Recap
65	March 4	3–3 OT	@ Washington Capitals	Roussel	29–31–5	63	T
66	March 6	3–1	@ Tampa Bay Lightning	Roussel	30–31–5	65	W
67	March 8	3–4 OT	Dallas Stars	Roussel	30–32–5	65	L
68	March 10	8–2	Ottawa Senators	Roussel	31–32–5	67	W
69	March 12	4–4 OT	@ Montreal Canadiens	Chabot	31–32–6	68	T
70	March 13	5–5 OT	Tampa Bay Lightning	Roussel	31–32–7	69	T
71	March 19	3–5	Hartford Whalers	Soderstrom	31–33–7	69	L
72	March 20	3–5	@ Florida Panthers	Soderstrom	31–34–7	69	L
73	March 22	6–3	@ St. Louis Blues	Soderstrom	32–34–7	71	W
74	March 24	4–3	Florida Panthers	Soderstrom	33–34–7	73	W
75	March 26	2–7	@ New Jersey Devils	Soderstrom	33–35–7	73	L
76	March 27	2–3 OT	Mighty Ducks of Anaheim	Chabot	33–36–7	73	L
77	March 29	3–4	New York Rangers	Soderstrom	33–37–7	73	L
78	March 31	1–4	Calgary Flames	Soderstrom	33–38–7	73	L

April: 2–1–3, 7 points (home: 1–1–1; road: 1–0–2)

Game	Date	Score	Opponent	Decision	Record	Points	Recap
79	April 2	6–5	@ Hartford Whalers	Soderstrom	34–38–7	75	W
80	April 4	2–2 OT	@ Winnipeg Jets	Soderstrom	34–38–8	76	T
81	April 7	3–3 OT	Florida Panthers	Soderstrom	34–38–9	77	T
82	April 10	3–4	Boston Bruins	Soderstrom	34–39–9	77	L
83	April 12	4–2	New Jersey Devils	Roussel	35–39–9	79	W
84	April 14	2–2 OT	@ New York Rangers	Roussel	35–39–10	80	T

Legend: W Win (2 points) L Loss (0 points) T Tie (1 point)

== Player statistics ==
=== Scoring ===
- Position abbreviations: C = Center; D = Defense; G = Goaltender; LW = Left wing; RW = Right wing
- † = Joined team via a transaction (e.g., trade, waivers, signing) during the season. Stats reflect time with the Flyers only.
- ‡ = Left team via a transaction (e.g., trade, waivers, release) during the season. Stats reflect time with the Flyers only.

No.	Player	Pos	Regular season					
No.	Player	Pos	GP	G	A	Pts	+/-	PIM
8	Mark Recchi	RW	84	40	67	107	−2	46
88	Eric Lindros	C	65	44	53	97	16	103
17	Rod Brind'Amour	C	84	35	62	97	−9	85
19	Mikael Renberg	RW	83	38	44	82	8	36
3	Garry Galley	D	81	10	60	70	−11	91
29	Yves Racine	D	67	9	43	52	−11	48
42	Josef Beranek	LW	80	28	21	49	−2	85
11	Kevin Dineen	RW	71	19	23	42	−9	113
18	Brent Fedyk	RW	72	20	18	38	−14	74
2	Dmitri Yushkevich	D	75	5	25	30	−8	86
26	Vyacheslav Butsayev‡	C	47	12	9	21	2	58
9	Pelle Eklund‡	LW	48	1	16	17	−1	8
14	Dave Tippett	C	73	4	11	15	−20	38
20	Greg Hawgood‡	D	19	3	12	15	2	19
36	Andre Faust	LW	37	8	5	13	−1	10
25	Jeff Finley	D	55	1	8	9	16	24
20	Rob DiMaio†	LW	14	3	5	8	1	6
15	Al Conroy	LW	62	4	3	7	−12	65
22	Mark Lamb†	C	19	1	6	7	−3	16
28	Jason Bowen	D	56	1	5	6	12	87
21	Dave Brown	RW	71	1	4	5	−12	137
23 (Note: Malgunas wore number 43 in his first three games.)	Stewart Malgunas	D	67	1	3	4	2	86
27	Ryan McGill	D	50	1	3	4	−5	112
24	Bob Wilkie	D	10	1	3	4	−2	8
26	Rob Zettler†	D	33	0	4	4	−19	69
12	Jim Cummins‡	RW	22	1	2	3	0	71
10	Claude Boivin‡	C	26	1	1	2	−11	57
41	Milos Holan	D	8	1	1	2	−4	4
32	Chris Winnes	RW	4	0	2	2	1	0
10	Todd Hlushko†	LW	2	1	0	1	1	0
5	Rob Ramage†	D	15	0	1	1	−11	14
33	Dominic Roussel	G	60	0	1	1		4
40	Aris Brimanis	D	1	0	0	0	−1	0
30	Frederic Chabot†	G	4	0	0	0		0
6	Dan Kordic	D	4	0	0	0	0	5
35	Tommy Soderstrom	G	34	0	0	0		0
43	Claude Vilgrain	RW	2	0	0	0	−1	0

=== Goaltending ===
- † = Joined team via a transaction (e.g., trade, waivers, signing) during the season. Stats reflect time with the Flyers only.

No.	Player	Regular season										
No.	Player	GP	GS	W	L	T	SA	GA	GAA	SV%	SO	TOI
33	Dominic Roussel	60	55	29	20	5	1762	183	3.34	.896	1	3,285
30	Tommy Soderstrom	34	29	6	18	4	851	116	4.01	.864	2	1,736
35	Frederic Chabot†	4	0	0	1	1	40	5	4.26	.875	0	70

== Awards and records ==
=== Awards ===
Type	Award/honor	Recipient	Ref
League (annual)	NHL All-Rookie Team	Mikael Renberg (Forward)	
League (in-season)	NHL All-Star Game selection	Garry Galley	
League (in-season)	NHL All-Star Game selection	Eric Lindros (Note: Lindros was voted to the starting lineup.)	
League (in-season)	NHL All-Star Game selection	Mark Recchi	
Team	Barry Ashbee Trophy	Garry Galley	
Team	Bobby Clarke Trophy	Eric Lindros	
Team	Class Guy Award	Garry Galley	
Team	Pelle Lindbergh Memorial Trophy	Mikael Renberg	

=== Records ===
Among the team records set during the 1993–94 season was Kevin Dineen tying the team record for goals scored in a single game (4) on October 31. Eric Lindros tied the team single period records for most goals (3) and points (4) on January 19. A month later on February 15, Mikael Renberg matched the goals in single period record and on April 2, Lindros matched the points in a single period record. On the season, Renberg’s 82 points is a franchise rookie record and Gary Galley’s 60 assists is a franchise high for defensemen.

=== Milestones ===
Milestone	Player	Date	Ref
First game	Stewart Malgunas	October 5, 1993	
First game	Mikael Renberg	October 5, 1993	
First game	Milos Holan	October 12, 1993	
First game	Todd Hlushko	March 10, 1994	
First game	Aris Brimanis	April 14, 1994	

== Transactions ==
The Flyers were involved in the following transactions from June 10, 1993, the day after the deciding game of the 1993 Stanley Cup Final, through June 14, 1994, the day of the deciding game of the 1994 Stanley Cup Final.

=== Trades ===
Date	Details		Ref
June 11, 1993	To Philadelphia Flyers: Philadelphia's 3rd-round pick in 1993; Philadelphia's 5th-round pick in 1994	To Winnipeg Jets: Stephane Beauregard	
June 20, 1993	To Philadelphia Flyers: Jim Cummins; Philadelphia's 4th-round pick in 1993	To Detroit Red Wings: Rights to Greg Johnson; 5th-round pick in 1994	
August 5, 1993	To Philadelphia Flyers: Future considerations	To San Jose Sharks: Shawn Cronin	
September 9, 1993	To Philadelphia Flyers: Stewart Malgunas	To Detroit Red Wings: 5th-round pick in 1995	
October 5, 1993	To Philadelphia Flyers: Yves Racine; 4th-round pick in 1994	To Detroit Red Wings: Terry Carkner	
November 28, 1993	To Philadelphia Flyers: Rob Ramage	To Montreal Canadiens: Future considerations	
November 30, 1993	To Philadelphia Flyers: Future considerations	To Florida Panthers: Greg Hawgood	
February 1, 1994	To Philadelphia Flyers: Rob Zettler	To San Jose Sharks: Vyacheslav Butsayev	
February 21, 1994	To Philadelphia Flyers: Frederic Chabot	To Montreal Canadiens: Future considerations	
March 5, 1994	To Philadelphia Flyers: Mark Lamb	To Ottawa Senators: Claude Boivin; Rights to Kirk Daubenspeck	
March 18, 1994	To Philadelphia Flyers: Rob DiMaio	To Tampa Bay Lightning: Jim Cummins; 4th-round pick in 1995	
March 21, 1994	To Philadelphia Flyers: 8th-round pick in 1994	To Dallas Stars: Pelle Eklund	

=== Players acquired ===
Date	Player	Former team	Via	Ref
August 2, 1993	Jeff Finley	New York Islanders	Free agency	
August 2, 1993	Dave Tippett	Pittsburgh Penguins	Free agency	
August 3, 1993	Claude Vilgrain	New Jersey Devils	Free agency	
August 4, 1993	Tracy Egeland	Chicago Blackhawks	Free agency	
August 4, 1993	Norm Foster	Edmonton Oilers	Free agency	
August 4, 1993	Chris Winnes	Boston Bruins	Free agency	
March 6, 1994	Todd Hlushko	Canadian National Team	Free agency	

=== Players lost ===
Date	Player	New team	Via	Ref
N/A	David Fenyves		Retirement	
June 24, 1993	Gord Hynes	Florida Panthers	Expansion draft	
June 24, 1993	Andrei Lomakin	Florida Panthers	Expansion draft	
July 1993	Chris Jensen	Washington Capitals	Free agency	
July 20, 1993	Len Barrie	Florida Panthers	Free agency	
July 27, 1993	Keith Acton	Washington Capitals	Free agency	
August 3, 1993	Wes Walz	Calgary Flames (Note: Walz signed with Calgary on August 26, 1993.)	Buyout	
October 8, 1993	Ric Nattress		Retirement	

=== Signings ===
Date	Player	Term	Ref
July 14, 1993	Terry Carkner	3-year	
September 7, 1993	Mark Recchi	6-year	
September 13, 1993	Andre Faust	2-year	
September 13, 1993	Milos Holan	3-year	
September 13, 1993	Stewart Malgunas	2-year	
September 13, 1993	Ryan McGill	2-year	
September 23, 1993	Tommy Soderstrom	4-year	
October 30, 1993	Vaclav Prospal	5-year	
November 19, 1993	Yves Racine	4-year	
March 15, 1994	Chris Therien	4-year	
April 6, 1994	Neil Little	2-year	
May 11, 1994	Chris Herperger		
May 11, 1994	Aaron Israel		

== Draft picks ==
=== NHL entry draft ===
Philadelphia's picks at the 1993 NHL entry draft, which was held at the Colisée de Québec in Quebec City on June 26–27, 1993. The Flyers traded their first-round picks in 1993, 10th overall, and 1994 along with Steve Duchesne, Ron Hextall, Kerry Huffman, Mike Ricci, Chris Simon, the rights to Peter Forsberg, and $15 million to the Quebec Nordiques for the rights to Eric Lindros on June 30, 1992. They also traded their third-round pick, 62nd overall, to the Pittsburgh Penguins along with Kjell Samuelsson, Rick Tocchet, and Ken Wregget for the Los Angeles Kings' first-round pick, 15th overall, Brian Benning, and Mark Recchi on February 19, 1992.

Round	Pick	Player	Position	Nationality	Team (league)	Notes
2	36	Janne Niinimaa	Defense	Finland	Oulun Karpat (SM-liiga)	
3	71	Vaclav Prospal	Left wing	Czech Republic	HC Ceske Budejovice (CZE)	(Note: The Flyers traded the rights to Mike Bullard to the Toronto Maple Leafs for the Maple Leafs' third-round pick, 71st overall, on June 29, 1991.)
3	77	Milos Holan	Defense	Czech Republic	HC Vitkovice (CZE)	(Note: The Flyers traded Brian Dobbin, Gord Murphy, their 1992 third-round pick and their fourth-round pick, 88th overall, to the Boston Bruins for Garry Galley, Wes Walz and the Bruins' third-round pick, 77th overall, on January 2, 1992.)
5	114	Vladimir Krechin	Left wing	Russia	Traktor Chelyabinsk (Russia)	
6	140	Mike Crowley	Defense	United States	Bloomington Jefferson High School (USHS-MN)	
7	166	Aaron Israel	Goaltender	United States	Harvard University (ECAC)	
8	192	Paul Healey	Wing	Canada	Prince Albert Raiders (WHL)	
9	218	Tripp Tracy	Goaltender	United States	Harvard University (ECAC)	
9	226	E. J. Bradley	Center	United States	Tabor Academy (USHS-MA)	(Note: The Flyers traded Greg Paslawski to the Calgary Flames for the Flames' ninth-round pick, 226th overall, on March 18, 1993.)
10	244	Jeff Staples	Defense	Canada	Brandon Wheat Kings (WHL)	
11	270	Ken Hemenway	Defense	United States	Alaska All-Stars (AAAAHA)	

=== NHL supplemental draft ===
Philadelphia's picks at the 1993 NHL supplemental draft.

Round	Pick	Player	Position	Nationality	Team (league)
1	10	Shannon Finn	Defense	Canada	University of Illinois at Chicago (CCHA)

== Farm teams ==
The Flyers were affiliated with the Hershey Bears of the American Hockey League and the Johnstown Chiefs of the ECHL.
