= Claude Vilgrain =

Haitian-born Canadian ice hockey player

- Born: March 1, 1963 (age 63) Port-au-Prince, Haiti
- Height: 6 ft 1 in (185 cm)
- Weight: 205 lb (93 kg; 14 st 9 lb)
- Position: Right wing
- Shot: Right
- Played for: Vancouver Canucks; New Jersey Devils; Philadelphia Flyers
- National team: Canada
- NHL draft: 107th overall, 1982; Detroit Red Wings
- Playing career: 1988–2002

Claude Vilgrain (born March 1, 1963) is a Haitian-born Canadian former professional ice hockey right winger. He played in 89 National Hockey League games with the Vancouver Canucks, New Jersey Devils, and Philadelphia Flyers. He played in the 1988 Winter Olympics for the Canadian national team.

== Early life ==
Vilgrain was born on March 1, 1963, in Port-au-Prince, Haiti. He was born into an academically inclined family as his great-uncle was a doctor, his grandfather was a judge, and his father was an economist. When he was around one year old, his father Alix moved the family to Quebec City for an economist job after having studied there for seven years. Vilgrain later credited his success in hockey to his parents' willingness to adapt to Canadian culture and allow him to play sports. As he had grown up in a small suburb of Quebec City, Vilgrain first experienced racism while playing junior hockey in Montreal.

== Career ==
=== Junior ===
Vilgrain played junior hockey with the Laval Voisins in the QMJHL from 1980 to 1983. He played two seasons alongside future Pittsburgh Penguins star Mario Lemieux and finished second in team scoring with 126 points. Vilgrain reflected positively on his time as Lemieux's teammate and said he tried to emulate his moves. Despite his on-ice success, Vilgrain said he was thrown by the racial taunts he received during games. Following the 1981–82 season, Vilgrain was drafted in the sixth round of the 1982 NHL entry draft by the Detroit Red Wings. Vilgrain spent another season with the Voisins, where he scored 46 goals and 80 points to be selected for the QMJHL Second All-Star Team. However, after he was not invited to the Red Wings 1983 training camp and refused to report for another season with the Voisins, the Red Wings left him unsigned to a contract.

=== Université de Moncton ===
As an unsigned free agent, Vilgrain decided to continue his education and joined the Moncton Aigles Bleus at the Université de Moncton from 1983 to 1986.

== Personal life ==
Vilgrain's daughter Cassandra also played collegiate ice hockey before joining Brynäs IF of the Swedish Women's Hockey League. He now currently is the head coach of the U18 Prep Notre Dame Hounds at Athol Murray College of Notre Dame.

== Career statistics ==
=== Regular season and playoffs ===
			Regular season					Playoffs
Season	Team	League	GP	G	A	Pts	PIM	GP	G	A	Pts	PIM
1980–81	Laval Voisins	QMJHL	72	20	31	51	65	—	—	—	—	—
1981–82	Laval Voisins	QMJHL	58	26	29	55	64	17	14	10	24	22
1982–83	Laval Voisins	QMJHL	69	46	80	126	74	12	10	4	14	4
1983–84	Université de Moncton	AUS	20	11	20	31	8	—	—	—	—	—
1984–85	Université de Moncton	AUS	24	35	28	63	20	—	—	—	—	—
1985–86	Université de Moncton	AUS	19	17	20	37	25	—	—	—	—	—
1985–86	Canada	Intl	1	0	0	0	0	—	—	—	—	—
1986–87	Canada	Intl	78	28	42	70	38	—	—	—	—	—
1987–88	Canada	Intl	67	21	20	41	41	—	—	—	—	—
1987–88	Vancouver Canucks	NHL	6	1	1	2	0	—	—	—	—	—
1988–89	Milwaukee Admirals	IHL	23	9	13	22	26	—	—	—	—	—
1988–89	Utica Devils	AHL	55	23	30	53	41	5	0	2	2	2
1989–90	New Jersey Devils	NHL	6	1	2	3	4	4	0	0	0	0
1989–90	Utica Devils	AHL	73	37	52	89	32	—	—	—	—	—
1990–91	Utica Devils	AHL	59	32	46	78	26	—	—	—	—	—
1991–92	New Jersey Devils	NHL	71	19	27	46	74	7	1	1	2	17
1992–93	New Jersey Devils	NHL	4	0	2	2	0	—	—	—	—	—
1992–93	Cincinnati Cyclones	IHL	57	19	26	45	22	—	—	—	—	—
1992–93	Utica Devils	AHL	22	6	8	14	4	5	0	1	1	0
1993–94	Philadelphia Flyers	NHL	2	0	0	0	0	—	—	—	—	—
1993–94	Hershey Bears	AHL	76	30	53	83	45	11	1	6	7	2
1994–95	SC Herisau	SUI.2	36	27	33	60	44	4	3	2	5	10
1995–96	SC Herisau	SUI.2	36	27	41	68	44	5	5	5	10	12
1996–97	SC Herisau	SUI.2	42	30	46	76	64	11	9	12	21	10
1997–98	Frankfurt Lions	DEL	38	17	13	30	54	7	1	2	3	8
1998–99	SERC Wild Wings	DEL	52	16	29	45	26	—	—	—	—	—
1999–2000	EHC Biel-Bienne	SUI.2	36	26	44	70	16	9	2	10	12	14
2000–01	EHC Biel-Bienne	SUI.2	39	25	31	56	20	10	3	5	8	16
2001–02	SC Bern	NLA	—	—	—	—	—	4	2	2	4	0
NHL totals			89	21	32	53	78	11	1	1	2	17
AHL totals			285	128	189	317	148	21	1	9	10	4
SUI.2 totals			189	131	199	330	188	39	22	34	56	62

=== International ===
Year	Team	Event	GP	G	A	Pts	PIM
1988	Canada	OG	6	0	0	0	0
Senior totals			6	0	0	0	0
