= 1993–94 New York Rangers season =

NHL hockey team season (won Stanley Cup)

1993–94 New York Rangers
- Stanley Cup champions
- Presidents' Trophy winners
- Eastern Conference champions
- Atlantic Division champions
- Division: 1st Atlantic
- Conference: 1st Eastern
- 1993–94 record: 52–24–8
- Home record: 28–8–6
- Road record: 24–16–2
- Goals for: 299
- Goals against: 231

Team information
- General manager: Neil Smith
- Coach: Mike Keenan
- Captain: Mark Messier
- Alternate captains: Adam Graves; Kevin Lowe; Brian Leetch; Steve Larmer
- Arena: Madison Square Garden
- Average attendance: 18,001 (98.9%)
- Minor league affiliate: Binghamton Rangers (AHL)

Team leaders
- Goals: Adam Graves (52)
- Assists: Sergei Zubov (77)
- Points: Sergei Zubov (89)
- Penalty minutes: Jeff Beukeboom (170)
- Plus/minus: Brian Leetch (+28)
- Wins: Mike Richter (42)
- Goals against average: Mike Richter (2.57)

The 1993–94 New York Rangers season was the franchise's 68th season. The highlight of the season was winning the Stanley Cup and hosting the NHL All-Star Game at Madison Square Garden. The Rangers clinched their second Presidents' Trophy and sixth division title by finishing with the best record in the NHL at 52–24–8, setting a then-franchise record with 112 points.

This marked the last season in which the Rangers were under the control of Paramount Communications. Toward the end of the season, Paramount was taken over by Viacom. Shortly thereafter, Viacom divested itself of all of Paramount's interests in Madison Square Garden, including the Rangers, and sold them to ITT Corporation and Cablevision. A couple of years later, ITT would sell their share to Cablevision, who owned the Rangers until 2010, when the MSG properties became their own company. As of 2025, this remains the most recent season the Rangers won the Stanley Cup.

== Offseason ==
On April 17, 1993, the New York Rangers named Mike Keenan as their head coach. Keenan was hired to replace Ron Smith, who the team decided not to retain after he coached the second half of the season in place of the fired Roger Neilson. Keenan had taken the 1992–93 season off after spending four years as the head coach of the Chicago Blackhawks, where he led the team to the Stanley Cup Final in his last year.

== Pre-season ==
During the 1993 pre-season, the Rangers had a record of 7–2–0.

== Regular season ==
The 1993–94 season was a magical one for Rangers fans, as head coach Mike Keenan led the Rangers to their first Stanley Cup championship in 54 years. Two years prior, they acquired center Mark Messier, who was an integral part of the Edmonton Oilers' Cup-winning teams. Adam Graves, who also defected from the Oilers, joined the Rangers as well. Other ex-Oilers on the Blueshirts included trade deadline acquisitions Craig MacTavish and Glenn Anderson. Brian Leetch and Sergei Zubov were a solid "1–2 punch" on defense. In fact, Zubov led the team in scoring that season with 89 points, and continued to be an All-Star defenseman throughout his career. Graves would set a team record with 52 goals, breaking the old record of 50 held by Vic Hadfield. This record would later be broken by Jaromir Jagr on April 8, 2006, against the Boston Bruins. New York was not shut-out in any of their 84 regular-season games. The Rangers led the NHL in wins (52), points (112) and power-play goals (96, tied with the Buffalo Sabres) and power play percentage (23.02%). They also allowed the fewest shorthanded goals (5) of all 26 teams.

On February 21, 1994, Tony Amonte scored just eight seconds into the overtime period to win the game to give the Rangers a 4–3 home win over the Pittsburgh Penguins. It would prove to be the fastest overtime goal scored during the 1993–94 regular season.

=== All-Star Game ===
The 1994 National Hockey League All-Star Game took place on January 22, 1994, at Madison Square Garden in New York City. The final score was East 9, West 8.

=== Season standings ===
Atlantic Division
No.	CR		GP	W	L	T	GF	GA	Pts
1	1	**New York Rangers**	84	52	24	8	299	231	112
2	3	**New Jersey Devils**	84	47	25	12	306	220	106
3	7	**Washington Capitals**	84	39	35	10	277	263	88
4	8	**New York Islanders**	84	36	36	12	282	264	84
5	9	Florida Panthers	84	33	34	17	233	233	83
6	10	Philadelphia Flyers	84	35	39	10	294	314	80
7	12	Tampa Bay Lightning	84	30	43	11	224	251	71

Note: No. = Division rank, CR = Conference rank, W = Wins, L = Losses, T = Ties, GF = Goals For, GA = Goals Against, Pts = Points
Teams that qualified for the playoffs are highlighted in bold.

Eastern Conference
R		GP	W	L	T	GF	GA	Pts
**1**	**p-New York Rangers ***	**84**	**52**	**24**	**8**	**299**	**231**	**112**
**2**	**x-Pittsburgh Penguins ***	**84**	**44**	**27**	**13**	**299**	**285**	**101**
**3**	**New Jersey Devils**	**84**	**47**	**25**	**12**	**306**	**220**	**106**
**4**	**Boston Bruins**	**84**	**42**	**29**	**13**	**289**	**252**	**97**
**5**	**Montreal Canadiens**	**84**	**41**	**29**	**14**	**283**	**248**	**96**
**6**	**Buffalo Sabres**	**84**	**43**	**32**	**9**	**282**	**218**	**95**
**7**	**Washington Capitals**	**84**	**39**	**35**	**10**	**277**	**263**	**88**
**8**	**New York Islanders**	**84**	**36**	**36**	**12**	**282**	**264**	**84**
9	Florida Panthers	84	33	34	17	233	233	83
10	Philadelphia Flyers	84	35	39	10	294	314	80
11	Quebec Nordiques	84	34	42	8	277	292	76
12	Tampa Bay Lightning	84	30	43	11	224	251	71
13	Hartford Whalers	84	27	48	9	227	288	63
14	Ottawa Senators	84	14	61	9	201	397	37

Final standings

bold – Qualified for playoffs; x – Won division; p – Won Presidents' Trophy (and division); * – Division leader

=== Record vs. opponents ===
**Eastern Conference**
Opponent	Home	Away	Total	Pts.	Goals scored	Goals allowed
**Atlantic Division**
Florida Panthers	2–0–0	1–2–0	3–2–0	6	13	11
New Jersey Devils	3–0–0	3–0–0	6–0–0	12	24	9
New York Islanders	0–0–2	1–2–0	1–2–2	4	20	22
**New York Rangers**	–	–	–	–	–	–
Philadelphia Flyers	2–0–1	1–1–0	3–1–1	7	18	12
Tampa Bay Lightning	2–1–0	1–1–0	3–2–0	6	19	19
Washington Capitals	2–1–0	3–0–0	5–1–0	10	19	12
	**11–2–3**	**10–6–0**	**21–8–3**	**45**	**113**	**85**
**Northeast Division**
Boston Bruins	0–2–0	1–0–1	1–2–1	3	11	12
Buffalo Sabres	2–0–0	1–1–0	3–1–0	6	11	8
Hartford Whalers	2–0–0	1–1–0	3–1–0	6	15	7
Montreal Canadiens	1–0–1	0–2–0	1–2–1	3	13	14
Ottawa Senators	2–0–0	2–0–0	4–0–0	8	20	6
Pittsburgh Penguins	2–0–0	0–2–0	2–2–0	4	13	15
Quebec Nordiques	2–0–0	2–0–0	4–0–0	8	19	10
	**11–2–1**	**7–6–1**	**18–8–2**	**38**	**102**	**72**

**Western Conference**
Opponent	Home	Away	Total	Pts.	Goals scored	Goals allowed
**Central Division**
Chicago Blackhawks	0–1–0	1–0–0	1–1–0	2	8	8
Dallas Stars	1–0–0	0–1–0	1–1–0	2	4	3
Detroit Red Wings	0–1–0	0–1–0	0–2–0	0	7	12
St. Louis Blues	1–0–0	1–0–0	2–0–0	4	8	4
Toronto Maple Leafs	1–0–0	1–0–0	2–0–0	4	9	6
Winnipeg Jets	1–0–0	0–1–0	1–1–0	2	3	4
	**4–2–0**	**3–3–0**	**7–5–0**	**14**	**39**	**37**
**Pacific Division**
Mighty Ducks of Anaheim	0–1–0	0–1–0	0–2–0	0	4	7
Calgary Flames	0–1–0	0–0–1	0–1–1	1	5	8
Edmonton Oilers	0–0–1	1–0–0	1–0–1	3	6	4
Los Angeles Kings	1–0–0	1–0–0	2–0–0	4	8	6
San Jose Sharks	0–0–1	1–0–0	1–0–1	3	11	6
Vancouver Canucks	1–0–0	1–0–0	2–0–0	4	11	5
	**2–2–2**	**4–1–1**	**6–3–3**	**15**	**45**	**36**

== Playoffs ==
=== Eastern Conference Quarterfinals ===
In the opening round, the Rangers faced their crosstown rivals the New York Islanders, this series would turn out to be an extremely one sided affair as the Rangers outscored their rivals 22–3 in a four-game sweep.

=== Eastern Conference Semifinals ===
Next, the Rangers faced the Washington Capitals who were coming off a shocking six game win over the second seeded Pittsburgh Penguins. The Rangers appeared to have the series in hand after they won the first three games, although the Capitals avoided the sweep with a game four win, the Rangers got back in control and won the series in five games.

=== Eastern Conference Finals ===
After going down in the Eastern Conference Finals 3–2 to the New Jersey Devils, Rangers' captain Mark Messier made one of the most famous guarantees in sports history, saying the Rangers would win game six in New Jersey to tie the series 3–3. Not only did the Rangers back up Messier's guarantee, Messier scored a hat-trick in the Rangers' 4–2 win, sending the game back to New York for game seven. In game seven, the Rangers held a 1–0 lead after a second period goal by Brian Leetch. The lead would hold up until 7.7 seconds remaining, when Valeri Zelepukin was able to beat Mike Richter to send the game to overtime. In double overtime, Stephane Matteau scored his second overtime goal of the series to send the Rangers to the Final. The series-winning goal prompted the famous call of "Matteau, Matteau, Matteau!" by Rangers radio announcer Howie Rose.

=== Stanley Cup Final ===
The Rangers won their first Stanley Cup in 54 years, dating back to 1940, beating the Vancouver Canucks in seven games.

The Rangers winning this Stanley Cup drew 4.957 million viewers to Hockey Night in Canada, making it the highest-rated single CBC Sports program in history until the 10.6 million viewers for the men's ice hockey gold medal game between Canada and the United States at the 2002 Winter Olympics, when Canada won its first Olympic ice hockey gold medal since the 1952 Winter Olympics. CBC commentator Bob Cole, who called both games, said game seven was one of his most memorable TV games.

MSG Network broadcaster Al Trautwig said that this Stanley Cup win by the Rangers was seen as the coming of age of the NHL's influence in Europe. It marked the first time that the Russians got their names on the Stanley Cup and there were four who got that honor – Alexander Karpovtsev, Alexei Kovalev, Sergei Nemchinov and Sergei Zubov—giving a huge European television audience, including those watching on the brand-new television screens across the former Soviet Union, a Stanley Cup story to remember.

== Schedule and results ==
=== Preseason ===
1993 preseason
Preseason: 7–2–0 (home: 4–0–0; road: 3–2–0)

Game	Date	Opponent	Score	Record	Points	Location	Result
1	September 11	Toronto	5–3	1–0–0	2	Wembley Arena	W
2	September 12	@ Toronto	3–1	2–0–0	4	Wembley Arena	W
3	September 22	@ Pittsburgh	4–6	2–1–0	4	Civic Arena	L
4	September 23	@ N.Y. Islanders	2–4	2–2–0	4	Nassau Coliseum	L
5	September 25	@ Hartford	5–3	3–2–0	6	Hartford Civic Center	W
6	September 27	N.Y. Islanders	6–3	4–2–0	8	Madison Square Garden	W
7	September 29	Pittsburgh	5–4	5–2–0	10	Madison Square Garden	W
8	September 30	@ New Jersey	3–2	6–2–0	12	Brendan Byrne Arena	W
9	October 1	New Jersey	4–1	7–2–0	14	Madison Square Garden	W

Legend: W Win (2 points) L Loss (0 points) T Tie (1 point)

=== Regular season ===
1993–94 regular season
October: 7–5–1 (home: 5–2–1; road: 2–3–0), 15 points

Game	Date	Opponent	Score	OT	Decision	Record	Points	Location	Attendance	Recap
1	October 5	Boston	3–4		Richter	0–1–0	0	Madison Square Garden	18,200	L
2	October 7	Tampa Bay	5–4		Healy	1–1–0	2	Madison Square Garden	16,596	W
3	October 9	@ Pittsburgh	2–3		Richter	1–2–0	2	Civic Arena	16,994	L
4	October 11	Washington	5–2		Healy	2–2–0	4	Madison Square Garden	16,834	W
5	October 13	Quebec	6–4		Healy	3–2–0	6	Madison Square Garden	16,451	W
6	October 15	@ Buffalo	5–2		Healy	4–2–0	8	Buffalo Memorial Auditorium	15,200	W
7	October 16	@ Philadelphia	3–4		Healy	4–3–0	8	The Spectrum	17,308	L
8	October 19	Anaheim	2–4		Richter	4–4–0	8	Madison Square Garden	17,643	L
9	October 22	@ Tampa Bay	1–4		Richter	4–5–0	8	Thunderdome	18,667	L
10	October 24	Los Angeles	3–2		Richter	5–5–0	10	Madison Square Garden	18,200	W
11	October 28	Montreal	3–3	OT	Richter	5–5–1	11	Madison Square Garden	17,811	T
12	October 30	@ Hartford	4–1		Richter	6–5–1	13	Hartford Civic Center	13,183	W
13	October 31	New Jersey	4–1		Richter	7–5–1	15	Halifax Metro Centre	8,200	W

November: 11–1–1 (home: 5–0–1; road: 6–1–0), 23 points

Game	Date	Opponent	Score	OT	Decision	Record	Points	Location	Attendance	Recap
14	November 3	Vancouver	6–3		Richter	8–5–1	17	Madison Square Garden	18,001	W
15	November 6	@ Quebec	4–2		Richter	9–5–1	19	Colisée de Québec	14,603	W
16	November 8	Tampa Bay	6–3		Richter	10–5–1	21	Madison Square Garden	16,618	W
17	November 10	Winnipeg	2–1		Richter	11–5–1	23	Madison Square Garden	18,200	W
18	November 13	@ Washington	2–0		Richter	12–5–1	25	USAir Arena	17,519	W
19	November 14	San Jose	3–3	OT	Richter	12–5–2	26	Madison Square Garden	18,200	T
20	November 16	@ Florida	4–2		Healy	13–5–2	28	Miami Arena	14,021	W
21	November 19	@ Tampa Bay	5–3		Richter	14–5–2	30	Thunderdome	19,993	W
22	November 23	Montreal	5–4		Richter	15–5–2	32	Madison Square Garden	18,200	W
23	November 24	@ Ottawa	7–1		Healy	16–5–2	34	Ottawa Civic Centre	10,411	W
24	November 27	@ N.Y. Islanders	4–6		Healy	16–6–2	34	Nassau Coliseum	16,297	L
25	November 28	Washington	3–1		Richter	17–6–2	36	Madison Square Garden	17,941	W
26	November 30	@ New Jersey	3–1		Richter	18–6–2	38	Brendan Byrne Arena	19,040	W

December: 8–3–1 (home: 5–0–1; road: 3–3–0), 17 points

Game	Date	Opponent	Score	OT	Decision	Record	Points	Location	Attendance	Recap
27	December 4	@ Toronto	4–3		Richter	19–6–2	40	Maple Leaf Gardens	15,728	W
28	December 5	New Jersey	2–1		Richter	20–6–2	42	Madison Square Garden	18,200	W
29	December 8	Edmonton	1–1	OT	Richter	20–6–3	43	Madison Square Garden	18,200	T
30	December 13	Buffalo	2–0		Richter	21–6–3	45	Madison Square Garden	18,200	W
31	December 15	Hartford	5–2		Richter	22–6–3	47	Madison Square Garden	17,967	W
32	December 17	@ Detroit	4–6		Healy	22–7–3	47	Joe Louis Arena	19,875	L
33	December 19	Ottawa	6–3		Richter (W)	23–7–3	49	Madison Square Garden	17,935	W
34	December 22	@ Florida	2–3		Richter	23–8–3	49	Miami Arena	14,706	L
35	December 23	@ Washington	1–0		Healy	24–8–3	51	USAir Arena	15,772	W
36	December 26	New Jersey	8–3		Healy	25–8–3	53	Madison Square Garden	18,200	W
37	December 29	@ St. Louis	4–3		Richter	26–8–3	55	St. Louis Arena	18,163	W
38	December 31	@ Buffalo	1–4		Healy	26–9–3	55	Buffalo Memorial Auditorium	16,284	L

January: 7–4–0 (home: 4–2–0; road: 3–2–0), 14 points

Game	Date	Opponent	Score	OT	Decision	Record	Points	Location	Attendance	Recap
39	January 3	Florida	3–2		Richter	27-9–3	57	Madison Square Garden	18,200	W
40	January 5	Calgary	1–4		Richter	27–10–3	57	Madison Square Garden	18,200	L
41	January 8	@ Montreal	2–3		Healy	27–11–3	57	Montreal Forum	17,425	L
42	January 10	Tampa Bay	2–5		Healy	27–12–3	57	Madison Square Garden	17,993	L
43	January 14	Philadelphia	5–2		Richter	28–12–3	59	Madison Square Garden	18,200	W
44	January 16	@ Chicago	5–1		Richter	29–12–3	61	Chicago Stadium	18,472	W
45	January 18	St. Louis	4–1		Richter	30–12–3	63	Madison Square Garden	18,200	W
46	January 25	@ San Jose	8–3		Richter	31–12–3	65	San Jose Arena	17,190	W
47	January 27	@ Los Angeles	5–4	OT 4:58	Richter	32–12–3	67	Great Western Forum	16,005	W
48	January 28	@ Anaheim	2–3		Healy	32–13–3	67	Arrowhead Pond of Anaheim	17,174	L
49	January 31	Pittsburgh	5–3		Richter	33–13–3	69	Madison Square Garden	18,200	W

February: 7–5–1 (home: 3–2–1; road: 4–3–0), 15 points

Game	Date	Opponent	Score	OT	Decision	Record	Points	Location	Attendance	Recap
50	February 2	N.Y. Islanders	4–4	OT	Richter	33–13–4	70	Madison Square Garden	18,200	T
51	February 3	@ Boston	3–0		Healy	34–13–4	72	Boston Garden	14,448	W
52	February 7	Washington	1–4		Richter	34–14–4	72	Madison Square Garden	18,200	L
53	February 9	@ Montreal	3–4	OT 1:27	Healy	34–15–4	72	Montreal Forum	16,725	L
	February 11	Quebec	Postponed (snow); rescheduled for March 2					Madison Square Garden		
54	February 12	@ Ottawa	4–3	OT 2:37	Richter	35–15–4	74	Ottawa Civic Centre	10,575	W
55	February 14	@ Quebec	4–2		Richter	36–15–4	76	Colisée de Québec	15,029	W
56	February 18	Ottawa	3–0		Richter	37–15–4	78	Madison Square Garden	18,200	W
57	February 19	@ Hartford	2–4		Richter	37–16–4	78	Hartford Civic Center	15,635	L
58	February 21	Pittsburgh	4–3	OT :08	Richter	38–16–4	80	Madison Square Garden	18,200	W
59	February 23	Boston	3–6		Healy	38–17–4	80	Madison Square Garden	18,200	L
60	February 24	@ New Jersey	3–1		Richter	39–17–4	82	Brendan Byrne Arena	19,040	W
61	February 26	@ Dallas	1–3		Richter	39–18–4	82	Reunion Arena	16,914	L
62	February 28	Philadelphia	4–1		Richter	40–18–4	84	Madison Square Garden	18,200	W

March: 7–5–3 (home: 2–2–1; road: 5–3–2), 17 points

Game	Date	Opponent	Score	OT	Decision	Record	Points	Location	Attendance	Recap
63	March 2	Quebec	5–2		Richter	41–18–4	86	Madison Square Garden	18,200	W
64	March 4	N.Y. Islanders	3–3	OT	Richter	41–18–5	87	Madison Square Garden	18,200	T
65	March 5	@ N.Y. Islanders	5–4		Richter	42–18–5	89	Nassau Coliseum	16,297	W
66	March 7	Detroit	3–6		Richter	42–19–5	89	Madison Square Garden	18,200	L
67	March 9	@ Washington	7–5		Healy	43–19–5	91	Halifax Metro Centre	9,200	W
68	March 10	@ Boston	2–2	OT	Healy	43–19–6	92	Boston Garden	14,448	T
69	March 12	@ Pittsburgh	2–6		Healy	43–20–6	92	Civic Arena	17,537	L
70	March 14	@ Florida	1–2		Richter	43–21–6	92	Miami Arena	14,704	L
71	March 16	Hartford	4–0		Richter	44–21–6	94	Madison Square Garden	18,200	W
72	March 18	Chicago	3–7		Richter	44–22–6	94	Madison Square Garden	18,200	L
73	March 22	@ Calgary	4–4	OT	Healy	44–22–7	95	Olympic Saddledome	20,230	T
74	March 23	@ Edmonton	5–3		Richter	45–22–7	97	Northlands Coliseum	14,186	W
75	March 25	@ Vancouver	5–2		Richter	46–22–7	99	Pacific Coliseum	16,150	W
76	March 27	@ Winnipeg	1–3		Healy	46–23–7	99	Winnipeg Arena	12,793	L
77	March 29	@ Philadelphia	4–3		Richter	47–23–7	101	The Spectrum	17,380	W

April: 5–1–1 (home: 4–0–1; road: 1–1–0), 11 points

Game	Date	Opponent	Score	OT	Decision	Record	Points	Location	Attendance	Recap
78	April 1	Dallas	3–0		Richter	48–23–7	103	Madison Square Garden	18,200	W
79	April 2	@ New Jersey	4–2		Richter	49–23–7	105	Brendan Byrne Arena	19,040	W
80	April 4	Florida	3–2		Richter	50–23–7	107	Madison Square Garden	18,200	W
81	April 8	Toronto	5–3		Richter	51–23–7	109	Madison Square Garden	18,200	W
82	April 10	@ N.Y. Islanders	4–5		Healy	51–24–7	109	Nassau Coliseum	16,297	L
83	April 12	Buffalo	3–2		Richter	52–24–7	111	Madison Square Garden	18,200	W
84	April 14	Philadelphia	2–2	OT	Richter	52–24–8	112	Madison Square Garden	18,200	T

Legend: W Win (2 points) L Loss (0 points) T Tie (1 point)

=== Playoffs ===
1994 Stanley Cup playoffs
Eastern Conference Quarterfinals vs. (E8) New York Islanders – Rangers win 4–0

Game	Date	Opponent	Score	OT	Decision	Series	Location	Attendance	Recap
1	April 17	N.Y. Islanders	6–0		Richter	Rangers lead 1–0	Madison Square Garden	18,200	W
2	April 18	N.Y. Islanders	6–0		Richter	Rangers lead 2–0	Madison Square Garden	18,200	W
3	April 21	@ N.Y. Islanders	5–1		Richter	Rangers lead 3–0	Nassau Coliseum	16,297	W
4	April 24	@ N.Y. Islanders	5–2		Richter	Rangers win 4–0	Nassau Coliseum	16,287	W

Eastern Conference Semifinals vs. (E7) Washington Capitals – Rangers win 4–1

Game	Date	Opponent	Score	OT	Decision	Series	Location	Attendance	Recap
1	May 1	Washington	6–3		Richter	Rangers lead 1–0	Madison Square Garden	18,200	W
2	May 3	Washington	5–2		Richter	Rangers lead 2–0	Madison Square Garden	18,200	W
3	May 5	@ Washington	3–0		Richter	Rangers lead 3–0	USAir Arena	18,130	W
4	May 7	@ Washington	2–4		Richter	Rangers lead 3–1	USAir Arena	18,130	L
5	May 9	Washington	4–3		Richter	Rangers win 4–1	Madison Square Garden	18,200	W

Eastern Conference Finals vs. (E3) New Jersey Devils – Rangers win 4–3

Game	Date	Opponent	Score	OT	Decision	Series	Location	Attendance	Recap
1	May 15	New Jersey	3–4	2OT 36:23	Richter	Devils lead 1–0	Madison Square Garden	18,200	L
2	May 17	New Jersey	4–0		Richter	Series tied 1–1	Madison Square Garden	18,200	W
3	May 19	@ New Jersey	3–2	2OT 26:13	Richter	Rangers lead 2–1	Brendan Byrne Arena	19,040	W
4	May 21	@ New Jersey	1–3		Richter	Series tied 2–2	Brendan Byrne Arena	19,040	L
5	May 23	New Jersey	1–4		Richter	Devils lead 3–2	Madison Square Garden	18,200	L
6	May 25	@ New Jersey	4–2		Richter	Series tied 3–3	Brendan Byrne Arena	19,040	W
7	May 27	New Jersey	2–1	2OT 24:24	Richter	Rangers win 4–3	Madison Square Garden	18,200	W

Stanley Cup Finals vs. (W7) Vancouver Canucks – Rangers win 4–3

Game	Date	Opponent	Score	OT	Decision	Series	Location	Attendance	Recap
1	May 31	Vancouver	2–3	OT 19:28	Richter	Canucks lead 1–0	Madison Square Garden	18,200	L
2	June 2	Vancouver	3–1		Richter	Series tied 1–1	Madison Square Garden	18,200	W
3	June 4	@ Vancouver	5–1		Richter	Rangers lead 2–1	Pacific Coliseum	16,150	W
4	June 7	@ Vancouver	4–2		Richter	Rangers lead 3–1	Pacific Coliseum	16,150	W
5	June 9	Vancouver	3–6		Richter	Rangers lead 3–2	Madison Square Garden	18,200	L
6	June 11	@ Vancouver	1–4		Richter	Series tied 3–3	Pacific Coliseum	16,150	L
7	June 14	Vancouver	3–2		Richter	Rangers win 4–3	Madison Square Garden	18,200	W

Legend: W Win L Loss

== Player statistics ==
Skaters

Regular season
Player	GP	G	A	Pts	+/−	PIM
Sergei Zubov	78	12	77	89	20	39
Mark Messier	76	26	58	84	25	76
Adam Graves	84	52	27	79	27	127
Brian Leetch	84	23	56	79	28	67
Steve Larmer	68	21	39	60	14	41
Alexei Kovalev	76	23	33	56	18	154
Esa Tikkanen	83	22	32	54	5	114
Mike Gartner^{‡}	71	28	24	52	11	58
Sergei Nemchinov	76	22	27	49	13	36
Tony Amonte^{‡}	72	16	22	38	5	31
Kevin Lowe	71	5	14	19	4	70
Alexander Karpovtsev	67	3	15	18	12	58
Jeff Beukeboom	68	8	8	16	18	170
Greg Gilbert	76	4	11	15	−3	29
Mike Hudson	48	4	7	11	−5	47
Jay Wells	79	2	7	9	4	110
Ed Olczyk	37	3	5	8	−1	28
Nick Kypreos^{†}	46	3	5	8	−8	102
Stephane Matteau^{†}	12	4	3	7	5	2
Brian Noonan^{†}	12	4	2	6	5	12
Glenn Anderson^{†}	12	4	2	6	1	12
Craig MacTavish^{†}	12	4	2	6	6	11
Darren Turcotte^{‡}	13	2	4	6	−2	13
Joe Kocur	71	2	1	3	−9	129
James Patrick^{‡}	6	0	3	3	1	2
Peter Andersson^{‡}	8	1	1	2	−3	2
Mike Hartman	35	1	1	2	−5	70
Joby Messier	4	0	2	2	−1	0
Mattias Norstrom	9	0	2	2	0	6
Doug Lidster	34	0	2	2	−12	33
Phil Bourque^{‡}	16	0	1	1	−2	8
Todd Marchant^{‡}	1	0	0	0	−1	0
Jim Hiller	2	0	0	0	1	7
Daniel Lacroix	4	0	0	0	0	0

Playoffs
Player	GP	G	A	Pts	PIM
Brian Leetch	23	11	23	34	6
Mark Messier	23	12	18	30	33
Alexei Kovalev	23	9	12	21	18
Sergei Zubov	22	5	14	19	0
Adam Graves	23	10	7	17	24
Steve Larmer	23	9	7	16	14
Brian Noonan	22	4	7	11	17
Stephane Matteau	23	6	3	9	20
Esa Tikkanen	23	4	4	8	34
Sergei Nemchinov	23	2	5	7	6
Glenn Anderson	23	3	3	6	42
Jeff Beukeboom	22	0	6	6	50
Craig MacTavish	23	1	4	5	22
Greg Gilbert	23	1	3	4	8
Alexander Karpovtsev	17	0	4	4	12
Doug Lidster	9	2	0	2	10
Joe Kocur	20	1	1	2	17
Kevin Lowe	22	1	0	1	20
Nick Kypreos	3	0	0	0	2
Ed Olczyk	1	0	0	0	0
Jay Wells	23	0	0	0	20

Goaltenders

Regular season
Player	GP	TOI	W	L	T	GA	GAA	SA	SV%	SO
Mike Richter	68	3710	42	12	6	159	2.57	1758	.910	5
Glenn Healy	29	1368	10	12	2	69	3.03	567	.878	2

Playoffs
Player	GP	TOI	W	L	GA	GAA	SA	SV%	SO
Mike Richter	23	1417	16	7	49	2.07	623	.921	4
Glenn Healy	2	68	0	0	1	0.89	17	.941	0

^{†}Denotes player spent time with another team before joining Rangers. Stats reflect time with Rangers only.
^{‡}Traded mid-season. Stats reflect time with Rangers only.

Note:

Pos = Position;GP = Games played; G = Goals; A = Assists; Pts = Points; PIM = Penalty minutes; +/- = Plus/minus; PPG = Power-play goals; SHG = Short-handed goals; GWG = Game-winning goals
Pos = Position;GP = Games played; Min, TOI = Minutes played; W = Wins; L = Losses; T,T/OT = Ties; OTL = Overtime losses; GA = Goals-against; GAA = Goals-against average; SO = Shutouts; SA = Shots against; SV = Shots saved;SV% = Save percentage;

== Awards and records ==
- Brian Leetch, Conn Smythe Trophy
- Most wins by goaltender, season – Mike Richter (1993–94) – 42
- Mike Richter, MVP of 45th NHL All-Star Game

== 45th NHL All-Star Game ==
New York Rangers NHL All-Star representatives at the 45th NHL All-Star Game in New York City, New York at Madison Square Garden.

Players

#	Player	Position	Conference	Goals	Assists	Points
9	Adam Graves	LW	(Eastern Conference All-Stars)		2	2
2	Brian Leetch	D, Starter	(Eastern Conference All-Stars)			
11	Mark Messier	C, Starter	(Eastern Conference All-Stars) Captain	1	2	3

Goaltenders

#	Player	Position	Conference	Saves	Shots against
35	Mike Richter	G	(Eastern Conference All-Stars); MVP of 45th NHL All-Star Game	16	18

Trainers

Name	Position	Conference
Joe Murphy	Trainer	(Eastern Conference All-Stars)
Dave Smith	Trainer	(Eastern Conference All-Stars)

== Transactions ==
- June 25, 1993: Doug Lidster was traded by the Vancouver Canucks to the New York Rangers in exchange for John Vanbiesbrouck.
- November 2, 1993: Nick Kypreos traded from Hartford Whalers with Barry Richter, Steve Larmer and round 6 pick in the 1994 NHL entry draft (Yuri Litvinov) to New York Rangers for Darren Turcotte and James Patrick.
- March 21, 1994:
  - Phil Bourque traded from NY Rangers to Ottawa for future considerations.
  - Tony Amonte and the rights to Matt Oates traded from NY Rangers to Chicago for Stephane Matteau and Brian Noonan.
  - Peter Andersson traded from NY Rangers to Florida for future considerations.
  - Mike Gartner traded from NY Rangers to Toronto for Glenn Anderson, the rights to Scott Malone and Toronto's 4th round pick in 1994 Entry Draft.
  - Craig MacTavish traded from Edmonton to NY Rangers for Todd Marchant.

== Draft picks ==
New York's picks at the 1993 NHL entry draft in Quebec City, Quebec, Canada, at the Colisée de Québec.

Round	#	Player	Position	Nationality	College/junior/club team (league)
1	8	Niklas Sundstrom	LW	Sweden	MODO (SEL)
2	34	Lee Sorochan	D	Canada	Lethbridge Hurricanes (WHL)
3	61	Maxim Galanov	D	Russia	HC Lada Togliatti (Russia)
4	86	Sergei Olympiev	LW	Belarus	Dinamo Minsk (Russia)
5	112	Gary Roach	D	Canada	Sault Ste. Marie Greyhounds (OHL)
6	138	Dave Trofimenkoff	G	Canada	Lethbridge Hurricanes (WHL)
7	162	Sergei Kondrashkin	LW	Russia	Cherepovets Metallurg (Russia)
7	164	Todd Marchant	LW	United States	Clarkson University (NCAA)
8	190	Ed Campbell	D	United States	Omaha Lancers (USHL)
9	216	Ken Shepard	G	Canada	Oshawa Generals (OHL)
10	242	Andrei Kudinov	C	Russia	Traktor Chelyabinsk (Russia)
11	261	Pavel Komarov	D	Russia	Torpedo Nizhny Novgorod (Russia)
11	268	Maxim Smelnitsky	LW	Russia	Traktor Chelyabinsk (Russia)

=== Expansion Draft ===
New York's losses at the 1993 NHL expansion draft in Quebec City, Quebec.

Round	#	Player	Nationality	Drafted by	Drafted from
1	12	Joe Cirella	Canada	Florida Panthers	New York Rangers
1	23	Steven King	United States	Mighty Ducks of Anaheim	New York Rangers

=== Supplemental Draft ===
New York's picks at the 1993 NHL supplemental draft.

Player	Position	Nationality	College/junior/club team (league)
Wayne Strachan	RW	Canada	Lake Superior State University (CCHA)

== Media ==
Ranger games were carried on the MSG Network, with some games broadcast on MSG II due to conflicts with New York Knicks National Basketball Association and New York Yankees Major League Baseball games. The broadcast crew included Sam Rosen, Bruce Beck, John Davidson, and Al Trautwig.

The games were also broadcast on radio station WFAN-AM; the broadcast team included Marv Albert, Howie Rose, Sal Messina, and Steve Somers. Some games were broadcast on WEVD-AM due to conflicts with New York Knicks National Basketball Association games and New York Jets National Football League games.
