= 1993–94 Quebec Nordiques season =

National Hockey League team season

1993–94 Quebec Nordiques
- Division: 5th Northeast
- Conference: 11th Eastern
- 1993–94 record: 34–42–8
- Home record: 19–17–6
- Road record: 15–25–2
- Goals for: 277
- Goals against: 292

Team information
- General manager: Pierre Page
- Coach: Pierre Page
- Captain: Joe Sakic
- Alternate captains: Steven Finn; Mike Ricci
- Arena: Colisée de Québec
- Average attendance: 14,564 (94.6%)
- Minor league affiliate: Cornwall Aces (AHL)

Team leaders
- Goals: Mats Sundin (32)
- Assists: Joe Sakic (64)
- Points: Joe Sakic (92)
- Penalty minutes: Steven Finn (159)
- Plus/minus: Craig Wolanin (+16)
- Wins: Stephane Fiset (20)
- Goals against average: Jocelyn Thibault (3.31)

The 1993–94 Quebec Nordiques season was the Nordiques' 23rd season of operation and its 15th in the National Hockey League (NHL). The Nordiques failed to qualify for the 1994 Stanley Cup playoffs.

== Regular season ==
=== Final standings ===
Northeast Division
| No. | CR | | GP | W | L | T | GF | GA | Pts |
|---|---|---|---|---|---|---|---|---|---|
| 1 | 2 | **Pittsburgh Penguins** | 84 | 44 | 27 | 13 | 299 | 285 | 101 |
| 2 | 4 | **Boston Bruins** | 84 | 42 | 29 | 13 | 289 | 252 | 97 |
| 3 | 5 | **Montreal Canadiens** | 84 | 41 | 29 | 14 | 283 | 248 | 96 |
| 4 | 6 | **Buffalo Sabres** | 84 | 43 | 32 | 9 | 282 | 218 | 95 |
| 5 | 11 | Quebec Nordiques | 84 | 34 | 42 | 8 | 277 | 292 | 76 |
| 6 | 13 | Hartford Whalers | 84 | 27 | 48 | 9 | 227 | 288 | 63 |
| 7 | 14 | Ottawa Senators | 84 | 14 | 61 | 9 | 201 | 397 | 37 |

Note: No. = Division rank, CR = Conference rank, W = Wins, L = Losses, T = Ties, GF = Goals For, GA = Goals Against, Pts = Points
Teams that qualified for the playoffs are highlighted in bold.

Eastern Conference
| R | | GP | W | L | T | GF | GA | Pts |
|---|---|---|---|---|---|---|---|---|
| **1** | **p-New York Rangers *** | **84** | **52** | **24** | **8** | **299** | **231** | **112** |
| **2** | **x-Pittsburgh Penguins *** | **84** | **44** | **27** | **13** | **299** | **285** | **101** |
| **3** | **New Jersey Devils** | **84** | **47** | **25** | **12** | **306** | **220** | **106** |
| **4** | **Boston Bruins** | **84** | **42** | **29** | **13** | **289** | **252** | **97** |
| **5** | **Montreal Canadiens** | **84** | **41** | **29** | **14** | **283** | **248** | **96** |
| **6** | **Buffalo Sabres** | **84** | **43** | **32** | **9** | **282** | **218** | **95** |
| **7** | **Washington Capitals** | **84** | **39** | **35** | **10** | **277** | **263** | **88** |
| **8** | **New York Islanders** | **84** | **36** | **36** | **12** | **282** | **264** | **84** |
| 9 | Florida Panthers | 84 | 33 | 34 | 17 | 233 | 233 | 83 |
| 10 | Philadelphia Flyers | 84 | 35 | 39 | 10 | 294 | 314 | 80 |
| 11 | Quebec Nordiques | 84 | 34 | 42 | 8 | 277 | 292 | 76 |
| 12 | Tampa Bay Lightning | 84 | 30 | 43 | 11 | 224 | 251 | 71 |
| 13 | Hartford Whalers | 84 | 27 | 48 | 9 | 227 | 288 | 63 |
| 14 | Ottawa Senators | 84 | 14 | 61 | 9 | 201 | 397 | 37 |

| Final standings |

bold – Qualified for playoffs; x – Won division; p – Won Presidents' Trophy (and division); * – Division leader

== Schedule and results ==
1993–94 regular season
October: 5–6–1 (home: 2–3–0; road: 3–3–1)

| Game | Date | Score | Opponent | Record | Attendance | Recap |
|---|---|---|---|---|---|---|
| 1 | October 6, 1993 | 5–5 | @ Ottawa Senators (1993–94) | 0–0–1 | 10,525 | T |
| 2 | October 9, 1993 | 3–7 | @ Boston Bruins (1993–94) | 0–1–1 | 13,633 | L |
| 3 | October 10, 1993 | 7–4 | Pittsburgh Penguins (1993–94) | 1–1–1 | 14,731 | W |
| 4 | October 13, 1993 | 4–6 | @ New York Rangers (1993–94) | 1–2–1 | 16,451 | L |
| 5 | October 16, 1993 | 5–2 | @ Montreal Canadiens (1993–94) | 2–2–1 | 17,959 | W |
| 6 | October 18, 1993 | 2–4 | Montreal Canadiens (1993–94) | 2–3–1 | 14,892 | L |
| 7 | October 20, 1993 | 5–2 | @ Hartford Whalers (1993–94) | 3–3–1 | 7,315 | W |
| 8 | October 21, 1993 | 2–3 | @ Chicago Blackhawks (1993–94) | 3–4–1 | 16,876 | L |
| 9 | October 23, 1993 | 3–2 | Dallas Stars (1993–94) | 4–4–1 | 14,149 | W |
| 10 | October 26, 1993 | 2–4 | Philadelphia Flyers (1993–94) | 4–5–1 | 14,787 | L |
| 11 | October 28, 1993 | 7–3 | @ Pittsburgh Penguins (1993–94) | 5–5–1 | 17,097 | W |
| 12 | October 30, 1993 | 3–5 | Detroit Red Wings (1993–94) | 5–6–1 | 14,098 | L |

November: 3–6–3 (home: 2–3–3; road: 1–3–0)

| Game | Date | Score | Opponent | Record | Attendance | Recap |
|---|---|---|---|---|---|---|
| 13 | November 2, 1993 | 8–2 | Tampa Bay Lightning (1993–94) | 6–6–1 | 13,635 | W |
| 14 | November 4, 1993 | 1–4 | @ Philadelphia Flyers (1993–94) | 6–7–1 | 17,301 | L |
| 15 | November 6, 1993 | 2–4 | New York Rangers (1993–94) | 6–8–1 | 14,602 | L |
| 16 | November 7, 1993 | 1–3 | Florida Panthers (1993–94) | 6–9–1 | 14,726 | L |
| 17 | November 9, 1993 | 1–2 | @ Washington Capitals (1993–94) | 6–10–1 | 10,267 | L |
| 18 | November 13, 1993 | 3–4 | @ Tampa Bay Lightning (1993–94) | 6–11–1 | 19,691 | L |
| 19 | November 14, 1993 | 5–2 | @ Florida Panthers (1993–94) | 7–11–1 | 12,735 | W |
| 20 | November 20, 1993 | 5–5 OT | Winnipeg Jets (1993–94) | 7–11–2 | 14,416 | T |
| 21 | November 23, 1993 | 1–1 OT | New Jersey Devils (1993–94) | 7–11–3 | 14,120 | T |
| 22 | November 25, 1993 | 8–6 | Los Angeles Kings (1993–94) | 8–11–3 | 14,897 | W |
| 23 | November 27, 1993 | 2–2 OT | Buffalo Sabres (1993–94) | 8–11–4 | 14,043 | T |
| 24 | November 30, 1993 | 2–5 | Boston Bruins (1993–94) | 8–12–4 | 14,885 | L |

December: 8–5–1 (home: 5–2–1; road: 3–3–0)

| Game | Date | Score | Opponent | Record | Attendance | Recap |
|---|---|---|---|---|---|---|
| 25 | December 3, 1993 | 3–2 | @ New York Islanders (1993–94) | 9–12–4 | 9,225 | W |
| 26 | December 4, 1993 | 3–1 | Vancouver Canucks (1993–94) | 10–12–4 | 14,549 | W |
| 27 | December 7, 1993 | 4–4 OT | Calgary Flames (1993–94) | 10–12–5 | 14,228 | T |
| 28 | December 9, 1993 | 3–2 | @ New Jersey Devils (1993–94) | 11–12–5 | 10,892 | W |
| 29 | December 11, 1993 | 5–2 | Ottawa Senators (1993–94) | 12–12–5 | 14,707 | W |
| 30 | December 13, 1993 | 5–3 | Washington Capitals (1993–94) | 13–12–5 | 14,832 | W |
| 31 | December 16, 1993 | 2–3 | @ Philadelphia Flyers (1993–94) | 13–13–5 | 17,091 | L |
| 32 | December 18, 1993 | 2–6 | New Jersey Devils (1993–94) | 13–14–5 | 15,004 | L |
| 33 | December 19, 1993 | 7–5 | San Jose Sharks (1993–94) | 14–14–5 | 14,729 | W |
| 34 | December 21, 1993 | 1–2 | @ Ottawa Senators (1993–94) | 14–15–5 | 10,503 | L |
| 35 | December 23, 1993 | 2–5 | @ Winnipeg Jets (1993–94) | 14–16–5 | 12,802 | L |
| 36 | December 28, 1993 | 1–4 | Tampa Bay Lightning (1993–94) | 14–17–5 | 14,646 | L |
| 37 | December 29, 1993 | 5–3 | New York Islanders (1993–94) | 15–17–5 | 15,264 | W |
| 38 | December 31, 1993 | 5–4 | @ Pittsburgh Penguins (1993–94) | 16–17–5 | 17,537 | W |

January: 4–8–0 (home: 2–2–0; road: 2–6–0)

| Game | Date | Score | Opponent | Record | Attendance | Recap |
|---|---|---|---|---|---|---|
| 39 | January 2, 1994 | 6–4 | @ Dallas Stars (1993–94) | 17–17–5 | 15,207 | W |
| 40 | January 4, 1994 | 1–5 | @ Los Angeles Kings (1993–94) | 17–18–5 | 16,005 | L |
| 41 | January 5, 1994 | 0–4 | Montreal Canadiens (1993–94) | 17–19–5 | 11,393 | L |
| 42 | January 7, 1994 | 4–6 | @ Edmonton Oilers (1993–94) | 17–20–5 | 15,057 | L |
| 43 | January 11, 1994 | 0–1 | @ Calgary Flames (1993–94) | 17–21–5 | 18,560 | L |
| 44 | January 12, 1994 | 3–4 | @ Vancouver Canucks (1993–94) | 17–22–5 | 15,640 | L |
| 45 | January 15, 1994 | 0–4 | Washington Capitals (1993–94) | 17–23–5 | 14,198 | L |
| 46 | January 18, 1994 | 6–3 | Pittsburgh Penguins (1993–94) | 18–23–5 | 14,229 | W |
| 47 | January 25, 1994 | 6–4 | Philadelphia Flyers (1993–94) | 19–23–5 | 13,949 | W |
| 48 | January 27, 1994 | 0–3 | @ Pittsburgh Penguins (1993–94) | 19–24–5 | 16,234 | L |
| 49 | January 29, 1994 | 3–2 | @ Hartford Whalers (1993–94) | 20–24–5 | 11,743 | W |
| 50 | January 31, 1994 | 3–4 | @ Boston Bruins (1993–94) | 20–25–5 | 13,961 | L |

February: 4–8–0 (home: 1–5–0; road: 3–3–0)

| Game | Date | Score | Opponent | Record | Attendance | Recap |
|---|---|---|---|---|---|---|
| 51 | February 1, 1994 | 1–2 | Hartford Whalers (1993–94) | 20–26–5 | 15,023 | L |
| 52 | February 3, 1994 | 4–3 | @ St. Louis Blues (1993–94) | 21–26–5 | 16,947 | W |
| 53 | February 5, 1994 | 2–3 | New York Islanders (1993–94) | 21–27–5 | 15,049 | L |
| 54 | February 8, 1994 | 1–6 | Boston Bruins (1993–94) | 21–28–5 | 15,038 | L |
| 55 | February 12, 1994 | 2–5 | @ Montreal Canadiens (1993–94) | 21–29–5 | 17,959 | L |
| 56 | February 14, 1994 | 2–4 | New York Rangers (1993–94) | 21–30–5 | 15,029 | L |
| 57 | February 17, 1994 | 8–2 | @ San Jose Sharks (1993–94) | 22–30–5 | 16,886 | W |
| 58 | February 18, 1994 | 1–0 | @ Mighty Ducks of Anaheim (1993–94) | 23–30–5 | 17,174 | W |
| 59 | February 21, 1994 | 1–2 | @ Buffalo Sabres (1993–94) | 23–31–5 | 13,601 | L |
| 60 | February 24, 1994 | 6–0 | St. Louis Blues (1993–94) | 24–31–5 | 14,630 | W |
| 61 | February 26, 1994 | 3–6 | Mighty Ducks of Anaheim (1993–94) | 24–32–5 | 15,032 | L |
| 62 | February 27, 1994 | 2–5 | @ New York Islanders (1993–94) | 24–33–5 | 11,545 | L |

March: 7–6–2 (home: 5–1–1; road: 2–5–1)

| Game | Date | Score | Opponent | Record | Attendance | Recap |
|---|---|---|---|---|---|---|
| 63 | March 2, 1994 | 2–5 | @ New York Rangers (1993–94) | 24–34–5 | 18,200 | L |
| 64 | March 5, 1994 | 4–1 | Toronto Maple Leafs (1993–94) | 25–34–5 | 15,399 | W |
| 65 | March 7, 1994 | 2–2 OT | @ New Jersey Devils (1993–94) | 25–34–6 | 16,620 | T |
| 66 | March 8, 1994 | 5–2 | Ottawa Senators (1993–94) | 26–34–6 | 14,584 | W |
| 67 | March 10, 1994 | 4–4 OT | Montreal Canadiens (1993–94) | 26–34–7 | 15,399 | T |
| 68 | March 12, 1994 | 4–3 | @ Washington Capitals (1993–94) | 27–34–7 | 17,362 | W |
| 69 | March 14, 1994 | 5–1 | Chicago Blackhawks (1993–94) | 28–34–7 | 14,014 | W |
| 70 | March 17, 1994 | 4–1 | Hartford Whalers (1993–94) | 29–34–7 | 14,131 | W |
| 71 | March 19, 1994 | 2–5 | @ Montreal Canadiens (1993–94) | 29–35–7 | 17,959 | L |
| 72 | March 20, 1994 | 3–5 | Edmonton Oilers (1993–94) | 29–36–7 | 14,236 | L |
| 73 | March 22, 1994 | 5–3 | Boston Bruins (1993–94) | 30–36–7 | 14,293 | W |
| 74 | March 26, 1994 | 3–6 | @ Toronto Maple Leafs (1993–94) | 30–37–7 | 15,728 | L |
| 75 | March 27, 1994 | 2–5 | @ New Jersey Devils (1993–94) | 30–38–7 | 6,222 | L |
| 76 | March 30, 1994 | 4–6 | @ Ottawa Senators (1993–94) | 30–39–7 | 10,546 | L |
| 77 | March 31, 1994 | 4–2 | @ Detroit Red Wings (1993–94) | 31–39–7 | 19,875 | W |

April: 3–3–1 (home: 2–1–1; road: 1–2–0)

| Game | Date | Score | Opponent | Record | Attendance | Recap |
|---|---|---|---|---|---|---|
| 78 | April 2, 1994 | 2–6 | Buffalo Sabres (1993–94) | 31–40–7 | 15,097 | L |
| 79 | April 4, 1994 | 6–4 | Buffalo Sabres (1993–94) | 32–40–7 | 14,674 | W |
| 80 | April 5, 1994 | 3–3 OT | Florida Panthers (1993–94) | 32–40–8 | 15,049 | T |
| 81 | April 7, 1994 | 5–2 | Hartford Whalers (1993–94) | 33–40–8 | 15,324 | W |
| 82 | April 10, 1994 | 1–4 | @ Buffalo Sabres (1993–94) | 33–41–8 | 14,910 | L |
| 83 | April 12, 1994 | 5–2 | @ Florida Panthers (1993–94) | 34–41–8 | 14,704 | W |
| 84 | April 14, 1994 | 2–5 | @ Tampa Bay Lightning (1993–94) | 34–42–8 | 21,094 | L |

Legend: W Win (2 points) L Loss (0 points) T Tie (1 point)

== Player statistics ==
Regular season
Scoring

| Player | Pos | GP | G | A | Pts | PIM | +/- | PPG | SHG | GWG |
|---|---|---|---|---|---|---|---|---|---|---|
| Joe Sakic | C | 84 | 28 | 64 | 92 | 18 | -8 | 10 | 1 | 9 |
| Mats Sundin | C | 84 | 32 | 53 | 85 | 60 | 1 | 6 | 2 | 4 |
| Valeri Kamensky | LW | 76 | 28 | 37 | 65 | 42 | 12 | 6 | 0 | 1 |
| Mike Ricci | C | 83 | 30 | 21 | 51 | 113 | -9 | 13 | 3 | 6 |
| Scott Young | RW | 76 | 26 | 25 | 51 | 14 | -4 | 6 | 1 | 1 |
| Iain Fraser | C | 60 | 17 | 20 | 37 | 23 | -5 | 2 | 0 | 2 |
| Andrei Kovalenko | RW | 58 | 16 | 17 | 33 | 46 | -5 | 5 | 0 | 4 |
| Martin Rucinsky | LW | 60 | 9 | 23 | 32 | 58 | 4 | 4 | 0 | 1 |
| Claude Lapointe | LW/C | 59 | 11 | 17 | 28 | 70 | 2 | 1 | 1 | 1 |
| Alexei Gusarov | D | 76 | 5 | 20 | 25 | 38 | 3 | 0 | 1 | 0 |
| Ron Sutter | C | 37 | 9 | 13 | 22 | 44 | 3 | 4 | 0 | 0 |
| Curtis Leschyshyn | D | 72 | 5 | 17 | 22 | 65 | -2 | 3 | 0 | 2 |
| Bob Bassen | C | 37 | 11 | 8 | 19 | 55 | -3 | 1 | 0 | 0 |
| Dave Karpa | D | 60 | 5 | 12 | 17 | 148 | 0 | 2 | 0 | 0 |
| Steven Finn | D | 80 | 4 | 13 | 17 | 159 | -9 | 0 | 0 | 1 |
| Craig Wolanin | D | 63 | 6 | 10 | 16 | 80 | 16 | 0 | 0 | 0 |
| Mike McKee | LW | 48 | 3 | 12 | 15 | 41 | 5 | 2 | 0 | 0 |
| Chris Lindberg | LW | 37 | 6 | 8 | 14 | 12 | -1 | 0 | 0 | 0 |
| Martin Gelinas | LW | 31 | 6 | 6 | 12 | 8 | -2 | 0 | 0 | 0 |
| Garth Butcher | D | 34 | 3 | 9 | 12 | 67 | -1 | 0 | 1 | 1 |
| Tommy Sjodin | D | 22 | 1 | 9 | 10 | 18 | 5 | 1 | 0 | 0 |
| Chris Simon | LW | 37 | 4 | 4 | 8 | 132 | -2 | 0 | 0 | 1 |
| Adam Foote | D | 45 | 2 | 6 | 8 | 67 | 3 | 0 | 0 | 0 |
| Reggie Savage | C | 17 | 3 | 4 | 7 | 16 | 3 | 1 | 0 | 0 |
| Brad Werenka | D | 11 | 0 | 7 | 7 | 8 | 4 | 0 | 0 | 0 |
| Kerry Huffman | D | 28 | 0 | 6 | 6 | 28 | 2 | 0 | 0 | 0 |
| Paul MacDermid | RW | 44 | 2 | 3 | 5 | 35 | -3 | 0 | 0 | 0 |
| Owen Nolan | RW | 6 | 2 | 2 | 4 | 8 | 2 | 0 | 0 | 0 |
| Tony Twist | LW | 49 | 0 | 4 | 4 | 101 | -1 | 0 | 0 | 0 |
| Stephane Fiset | G | 50 | 0 | 3 | 3 | 8 | 0 | 0 | 0 | 0 |
| Rene Corbet | LW | 9 | 1 | 1 | 2 | 0 | 1 | 0 | 0 | 0 |
| Dwayne Norris | RW | 4 | 1 | 1 | 2 | 4 | 1 | 0 | 0 | 0 |
| Ed Ward | RW | 7 | 1 | 0 | 1 | 5 | 0 | 0 | 0 | 0 |
| Jacques Cloutier | G | 14 | 0 | 0 | 0 | 2 | 0 | 0 | 0 | 0 |
| Alain Cote | D | 6 | 0 | 0 | 0 | 4 | -2 | 0 | 0 | 0 |
| Mike Hurlbut | D | 1 | 0 | 0 | 0 | 0 | -1 | 0 | 0 | 0 |
| Jon Klemm | D | 7 | 0 | 0 | 0 | 4 | -1 | 0 | 0 | 0 |
| Aaron Miller | D | 1 | 0 | 0 | 0 | 0 | -1 | 0 | 0 | 0 |
| Paxton Schulte | LW | 1 | 0 | 0 | 0 | 2 | 0 | 0 | 0 | 0 |
| Garth Snow | G | 5 | 0 | 0 | 0 | 2 | 0 | 0 | 0 | 0 |
| Jocelyn Thibault | G | 29 | 0 | 0 | 0 | 2 | 0 | 0 | 0 | 0 |

Goaltending

| Player | MIN | GP | W | L | T | GA | GAA | SO | SA | SV | SV% |
|---|---|---|---|---|---|---|---|---|---|---|---|
| Stephane Fiset | 2798 | 50 | 20 | 25 | 4 | 158 | 3.39 | 2 | 1434 | 1276 | .890 |
| Jocelyn Thibault | 1504 | 29 | 8 | 13 | 3 | 83 | 3.31 | 0 | 768 | 685 | .892 |
| Jacques Cloutier | 475 | 14 | 3 | 2 | 1 | 24 | 3.03 | 0 | 232 | 208 | .897 |
| Garth Snow | 279 | 5 | 3 | 2 | 0 | 16 | 3.44 | 0 | 127 | 111 | .874 |
| Team: | 5056 | 84 | 34 | 42 | 8 | 281 | 3.33 | 2 | 2561 | 2280 | .890 |

Note:

Pos = Position;GP = Games played; G = Goals; A = Assists; Pts = Points; PIM = Penalty minutes; +/- = Plus/minus; PPG = Power-play goals; SHG = Short-handed goals; GWG = Game-winning goals
Pos = Position;GP = Games played; Min, TOI = Minutes played; W = Wins; L = Losses; T,T/OT = Ties; OTL = Overtime losses; GA = Goals-against; GAA = Goals-against average; SO = Shutouts; SA = Shots against; SV = Shots saved;SV% = Save percentage;

== Transactions ==
The Nordiques were involved in the following transactions during the 1993–94 season.

=== Trades ===
| September 7, 1993 | To New York Rangers Alexander Karpovtsev | To Quebec Nordiques Mike Hurlbut |
| January 23, 1994 | To St. Louis Blues Steve Duchesne; Denis Chasse | To Quebec Nordiques Bob Bassen; Garth Butcher; Ron Sutter |
| February 13, 1994 | To Dallas Stars Manny Fernandez | To Quebec Nordiques Tommy Sjodin; 3rd round pick in 1994 (Chris Drury) |
| March 21, 1994 | To Edmonton Oilers Steve Passmore | To Quebec Nordiques Brad Werenka |
| June 3, 1994 | To New Jersey Devils 11th round pick in 1994 (Mike Hanson) | To Quebec Nordiques Stephane Yelle; 11th round pick in 1994 (Steven Low) |
| June 28, 1994 | To Toronto Maple Leafs Mats Sundin; Garth Butcher; Todd Warriner; 1st round pick in 1994 (Nolan Baumgartner) | To Quebec Nordiques Wendel Clark; Sylvain Lefebvre; Landon Wilson; 1st round pick in 1994 (Jeff Kealty) |
| June 28, 1994 | To New York Islanders Ron Sutter; 1st round pick in 1994 (Brett Lindros) | To Quebec Nordiques Uwe Krupp; 1st round pick in 1994 (Wade Belak) |

=== Waivers ===
| January 15, 1994 | To Ottawa Senators Kerry Huffman |
| January 15, 1994 | To Vancouver Canucks Martin Gelinas |

=== Free agents ===
| Player | Former team |
| Alain Cote | Tampa Bay Lightning |
| Iain Fraser | New York Islanders |
| Chris Lindberg | Calgary Flames |

| Player | New team |
| Mikhail Tatarinov | Boston Bruins |
| Len Esau | Calgary Flames |
| Gino Cavallini | Milwaukee Admirals (AHL) |

== Draft picks ==
Quebec's draft picks at the 1993 NHL entry draft held at the Quebec Coliseum in Quebec City, Quebec.

| Round | # | Player | Nationality | College/Junior/Club team (League) |
|---|---|---|---|---|
| 1 | 10 | Jocelyn Thibault | Canada | Sherbrooke Faucons (QMJHL) |
| 1 | 14 | Adam Deadmarsh | United States | Portland Winter Hawks (WHL) |
| 2 | 49 | Ashley Buckberger | Canada | Swift Current Broncos (WHL) |
| 3 | 75 | Bill Pierce | United States | Lawrence Academy (USHS-MA) |
| 4 | 101 | Ryan Tocher | Canada | Niagara Falls Thunder (OHL) |
| 5 | 127 | Anders Myrvold | Norway | Färjestad BK (Sweden) |
| 6 | 137 | Nicholas Checco | United States | Bloomington Jefferson High School (USHS-MN) |
| 6 | 153 | Christian Matte | Canada | Granby Bisons (QMJHL) |
| 7 | 179 | David Ling | Canada | Kingston Frontenacs (OHL) |
| 8 | 205 | Petr Franek | Czech Republic | Chemopetrol Litvínov (Czech Republic) |
| 9 | 231 | Vincent Auger | Canada | Hawkesbury Hawks (CJHL) |
| 10 | 257 | Mark Pivetz | Canada | Saskatoon Titans (SJHL) |
| 11 | 283 | John Hillman | United States | St. Paul Vulcans (USHL) |

== See also ==
- 1993–94 NHL season
