= Greg Pankewicz =

Canadian ice hockey player and coach

- Born: October 6, 1970 (age 54); Drayton Valley, Alberta, Canada
- Height: 6 ft 0 in (183 cm)
- Weight: 205 lb (93 kg; 14 st 9 lb)
- Position: Right wing
- Shot: Right
- Played for: Ottawa Senators; Calgary Flames
- NHL draft: Undrafted
- Playing career: 1991–2009

Greg Pankewicz (born October 6, 1970) is a Canadian ice hockey coach and former professional ice hockey player. Pankewicz played 21 games in the National Hockey League for the Ottawa Senators and Calgary Flames during the 1993–94 and 1998–99 seasons, where he recorded three assists and 22 penalty minutes. The rest of his career, which lasted from 1991 to 2009, was spent in the minor leagues.

== Playing career ==
Pankewicz turned pro in 1992, and spent most of his 16 seasons in the minor leagues, recording over 500 professional goals. In 2006–07, he helped lead the Eagles to their second Ray Miron President's Cup title in three years. Pankewicz's 32 points in the playoffs set a CHL league record and earned him the playoff MVP.

In 2009, Pankewicz retired from the Eagles and as franchise leading goal-scorer he was the first Eagle to have his number 89 retired by the team. Pankewicz subsequently joined the team as an assistant coach.

Pankewicz became famous after a February 19 2011 game between the Eagles and the Mississippi RiverKings. Enraged by the referee, he stripped half naked on the players' bench, throwing his suit, shirt, and shoes on the ice before exiting shirtless.

== Post-playing career ==
After the 2012–13 season, Pankewicz left the Colorado Eagles, after four seasons as an assistant coach to pursue other ventures.

== Career statistics ==
=== Regular season and playoffs ===
			Regular season					Playoffs
Season	Team	League	GP	G	A	Pts	PIM	GP	G	A	Pts	PIM
1988–89	Sherwood Park Crusaders	AJHL	56	26	18	44	307	—	—	—	—	—
1989–90	Regina Pats	WHL	63	14	24	38	136	10	1	3	4	19
1990–91	Regina Pats	WHL	72	39	80	134	8	4	7	11	12
1991–92	Knoxville Cherokees	ECHL	59	41	39	80	214	—	—	—	—	—
1992–93	New Haven Senators	AHL	62	23	20	43	163	—	—	—	—	—
1993–94	Ottawa Senators	NHL	3	0	0	0	2	—	—	—	—	—
1993–94	Prince Edward Island Senators	AHL	69	33	29	62	241	—	—	—	—	—
1994–95	Prince Edward Island Senators	AHL	75	37	30	67	161	6	1	1	2	24
1995–96	Portland Pirates	AHL	28	9	12	21	99	—	—	—	—	—
1995–96	Chicago Wolves	IHL	45	9	16	25	164	5	4	0	4	8
1996–97	Manitoba Moose	IHL	79	32	34	66	222	—	—	—	—	—
1997–98	Manitoba Moose	IHL	76	42	34	76	246	3	0	0	0	6
1998–99	Calgary Flames	NHL	18	0	3	3	20	—	—	—	—	—
1998–99	Saint John Flames	AHL	30	10	14	24	84	—	—	—	—	—
1998–99	Kentucky Thoroughblades	AHL	10	2	3	5	7	11	4	1	5	10
1999–00	Houston Aeros	IHL	62	22	19	41	134	5	2	1	3	18
2000–01	Houston Aeros	IHL	74	22	24	46	231	7	1	1	2	10
2001–02	Pensacola Ice Pilots	ECHL	63	39	46	85	306	3	2	0	2	8
2002–03	Pensacola Ice Pilots	ECHL	67	46	41	87	340	4	3	1	4	0
2003–04	Colorado Eagles	CHL	59	46	50	96	142	4	4	1	5	10
2003–04	Wilkes-Barre/Scranton Penguins	AHL	2	0	0	0	0	—	—	—	—	—
2004–05	Colorado Eagles	CHL	47	32	49	81	101	16	10	6	16	45
2005–06	Colorado Eagles	CHL	64	47	43	90	298	12	6	11	17	36
2006–07	Colorado Eagles	CHL	18	20	16	36	92	25	17	15	32	64
2007–08	Colorado Eagles	CHL	58	24	52	76	249	13	6	9	15	80
2008–09	Colorado Eagles	CHL	58	38	47	85	248	15	5	5	10	62
CHL totals			304	207	257	464	1130	85	48	47	95	297
IHL totals			336	127	127	254	997	20	7	2	9	42
NHL totals			21	0	3	3	22	—	—	—	—	—
