= Claude Boivin =

Canadian ice hockey player (born 1970)

- Born: March 1, 1970 (age 56) Sainte-Foy, Quebec, Canada
- Height: 6 ft 2 in (188 cm)
- Weight: 200 lb (91 kg; 14 st 4 lb)
- Position: Left wing
- Shot: Left
- Played for: Philadelphia Flyers; Ottawa Senators
- NHL draft: 14th overall, 1988; Philadelphia Flyers
- Playing career: 1990–1995; 1997–2000

Claude Boivin (born March 1, 1970) is a Canadian former professional ice hockey player. He played in the National Hockey League (NHL) with the Philadelphia Flyers and Ottawa Senators.

== Biography ==
As a youth, Boivin played in the 1983 Quebec International Pee-Wee Hockey Tournament with a minor ice hockey team from Riverains in Quebec City. He later played junior ice hockey with the Drummondville Voltigeurs in the Quebec Major Junior Hockey League. Boivin was drafted 14th overall by the Philadelphia Flyers in the 1988 NHL entry draft, and played for the Flyers and Ottawa Senators.

He was childhood friends with film director Ricardo Trogi and was portrayed in his 2014 movie 1987 by Laurent-Christophe De Ruelle.

== Career statistics ==
			Regular season					Playoffs
Season	Team	League	GP	G	A	Pts	PIM	GP	G	A	Pts	PIM
1986–87	Sainte-Foy Gouverneurs	QMAAA	39	12	27	39	90	—	—	—	—	—
1987–88	Drummondville Voltigeurs	QMJHL	63	23	26	49	233	17	5	3	8	74
1988–89	Drummondville Voltigeurs	QMJHL	63	20	36	56	218	4	0	2	2	27
1989–90	Drummondville Voltigeurs	QMJHL	46	19	41	60	257	—	—	—	—	—
1989–90	Laval Titan	QMJHL	13	5	10	15	54	13	7	13	20	59
1990–91	Hershey Bears	AHL	65	13	32	45	159	7	1	5	6	28
1991–92	Philadelphia Flyers	NHL	58	5	13	18	187	—	—	—	—	—
1991–92	Hershey Bears	AHL	20	4	5	9	96	—	—	—	—	—
1992–93	Philadelphia Flyers	NHL	30	5	4	9	76	—	—	—	—	—
1993–94	Philadelphia Flyers	NHL	26	1	1	2	57	—	—	—	—	—
1993–94	Hershey Bears	AHL	4	1	6	7	6	—	—	—	—	—
1993–94	Ottawa Senators	NHL	15	1	0	1	38	—	—	—	—	—
1994–95	Ottawa Senators	NHL	3	0	1	1	6	—	—	—	—	—
1994–95	PEI Senators	AHL	22	10	9	19	89	9	1	2	3	32
1997–98	Pensacola Ice Pilots	ECHL	10	0	1	1	45	—	—	—	—	—
1997–98	Québec Rafales	IHL	13	2	3	5	46	—	—	—	—	—
1997–98	Grand Rapids Griffins	IHL	31	12	5	17	69	3	0	0	0	0
1998–99	WSV Sterzing Broncos	AL	33	11	18	29	120	—	—	—	—	—
1998–99	WSV Sterzing Broncos	ITA	12	3	10	13	73	6	4	2	6	56
1999–2000	Long Beach Ice Dogs	IHL	42	2	6	8	147	4	0	0	0	12
AHL totals			111	28	52	80	350	16	2	7	9	60
NHL totals			132	12	19	31	364	—	—	—	—	—
IHL totals			86	16	14	30	262	7	0	0	0	12

Preceded by Darren Rumble	Philadelphia Flyers' first-round draft pick 1988	Succeeded by Mike Ricci
