= 1993–94 NHL season =

National Hockey League season

- League: National Hockey League
- Sport: Ice hockey
- Duration: October 5, 1993 – June 14, 1994
- Games: 84
- Teams: 26
- TV partner(s): CBC, TSN, SRC (Canada); ESPN, ABC, NBC (Note: NBC only televised the All-Star Game.) (United States)

Draft
- Top draft pick: Alexandre Daigle
- Picked by: Ottawa Senators

Regular season
- Presidents' Trophy: New York Rangers
- Season MVP: Sergei Fedorov (Red Wings)
- Top scorer: Wayne Gretzky (Kings)

Playoffs
- Playoffs MVP: Brian Leetch (Rangers)

Stanley Cup
- Champions: New York Rangers
- Runners-up: Vancouver Canucks

NHL seasons
- 1992–93 1994–95

The 1993–94 NHL season was the 77th regular season of the National Hockey League. The league expanded to 26 teams with the addition of the Mighty Ducks of Anaheim and the Florida Panthers. The Minnesota North Stars relocated to become the Dallas Stars. A significant structural change to the league was its realignment to geographically-named conferences and divisions. The New York Rangers defeated the Vancouver Canucks in seven games to become the Stanley Cup champions. It was the Rangers' fourth championship overall, and their first in 54 seasons, since 1939–40.

The spectacular play of Dominik Hasek of the Buffalo Sabres ushered in a new era of goaltending dominance in the NHL. Only three teams reached the 300-goal plateau, and only one team, the Detroit Red Wings, averaged more than four goals scored per game. Goaltenders combined for 99 shutouts during the regular season, a mark that broke the all-time regular-season record of 85 set in 1974–75.

== League business ==
=== Expansion ===
The Mighty Ducks of Anaheim and the Florida Panthers started play this season, increasing the league to 26 teams. The Ducks became the second team in the Greater Los Angeles area after the Los Angeles Kings, while the Panthers became the second team in the state of Florida after the Tampa Bay Lightning. The 1993 NHL expansion draft was held on June 24 to fill the rosters of the Mighty Ducks and the Panthers.

=== Stars relocation ===
The Minnesota North Stars relocated to Dallas, Texas to become the Dallas Stars. It was the first franchise relocation for the NHL since the Colorado Rockies became the New Jersey Devils in 1982–83.

=== Realignment ===
The names of the conferences were changed from Campbell and Wales to Western and Eastern respectively, and the divisions' names were changed from Adams, Patrick, Norris, and Smythe to Northeast, Atlantic, Central, and Pacific respectively. Each division had changes. The Northeast Division would welcome the Pittsburgh Penguins, previously from the Patrick Division. The Atlantic Division would welcome the newcomer Florida Panthers and the Tampa Bay Lightning, previously from the Norris Division. The Central Division would welcome the Winnipeg Jets, previously from the Smythe Division. The Pacific Division would welcome the newcomer Mighty Ducks of Anaheim. New league commissioner Gary Bettman, who had previously worked in the National Basketball Association (NBA), thought the old names could be confusing to non-traditional fans and believed that a change to geographically named divisions, as used in the NBA and most other North American professional sports, would be more easily understandable to new fans.

In addition, the playoff format was changed to a conference based seeding over division specific brackets: the division winners were seeded one-two by order of point finish, then the top six remaining teams in the conference were seeded three through eight. However, unlike the NBA, the NHL matched the highest-seeded winners against the lowest-seeded winners in the second round. In order to reduce the number of long trips to and from the West Coast, whenever a Central Division team played a Pacific Division team in the playoffs, the format was 2–3–2 rather than the traditional 2–2–1–1–1, a format that was only used for the 1993–94 season.

=== Entry draft ===
The 1993 NHL entry draft was held on June 26, 1993, at the Colisée de Québec in Quebec City, Quebec. Alexandre Daigle was selected first overall by the Ottawa Senators.

=== Rule changes ===
The high-sticking rules were amended to allow goals hit by a stick below the height of the crossbar, instead of the height of the player's shoulders like other situations.

== Arena changes ==
- The expansion Mighty Ducks of Anaheim moved into the Arrowhead Pond of Anaheim, with Arrowhead Water acquired the naming rights.
- The relocated Dallas Stars moved from the Met Center in Bloomington, Minnesota to Reunion Arena in Dallas.
- The expansion Florida Panthers moved into Miami Arena.
- The San Jose Sharks moved from the Cow Palace in Daly City, California to the San Jose Arena in San Jose, California.
- The Tampa Bay Lightning moved from Expo Hall in East Lake-Orient Park, Florida to the Thunderdome in St. Petersburg, Florida.
- The Washington Capitals' home arena, the Capital Centre, was renamed USAir Arena after USAir acquired the naming rights.

== Regular season ==
=== Neutral site games ===
This was the second regular season that the NHL and Bruce McNall's Multivision Marketing and Public Relations Co. organized games held in cities without a franchise as a litmus test for future expansion. With the addition of the Mighty Ducks of Anaheim and the Florida Panthers to the league, the number of these games increased from 24 to 26.

The Dallas Stars played a neutral-site game in their previous market of Minnesota at the Target Center in Minneapolis, where they were greeted enthusiastically. The Minnesota North Stars' tradition of playing on New Year's Eve and holding a post-game skate on the ice was also continued with a game between the Philadelphia Flyers and Boston Bruins.

The Tampa Bay Lightning–Detroit Red Wings contest in Minneapolis was scheduled for Martin Luther King Day, a Monday, with an afternoon face-off at 2:05 PM. However, due to an error on the NHL's part, the Lightning believed themselves to be playing at 7:35 PM, an error that was only discovered two weeks prior to the game by reporters. The Lightning ended up playing an 8:05 PM game in Winnipeg, flying back to the U.S., and playing again 18 hours later in Minneapolis.

The Panthers, in the midst of a playoff race, played a March "home" game against the Toronto Maple Leafs in Hamilton, Ontario.

Date	Winning team	Score	Losing team	Score	OT	City	State/Province	Arena	Attendance
October 21, 1993	St. Louis	5	San Jose	2		Sacramento	CA	ARCO Arena	7,144
October 31, 1993	NY Rangers	4	New Jersey	1		Halifax	NS	Halifax Metro Centre	8,200
November 3, 1993	Pittsburgh	6	Buffalo	2		Sacramento	CA	ARCO Arena	10,117
November 9, 1993	Anaheim	4	Dallas	2		Phoenix	AZ	America West Arena	8,143
November 18, 1993	NY Islanders	5	Montréal	1		Hamilton	ON	Copps Coliseum	17,008
December 9, 1993	Dallas	6	Ottawa	1		Minneapolis	MN	Target Center	14,058
December 23, 1993	Vancouver	4	Calgary	3		Saskatoon	SK	Saskatchewan Place	11,429*
December 31, 1993	Philadelphia	4	Boston	3		Minneapolis	MN	Target Center	10,855
January 4, 1994	Tampa Bay	1	Toronto	0		Hamilton	ON	Copps Coliseum	17,526*
January 5, 1994	Montréal	2	Québec	0		Phoenix	AZ	America West Arena	11,393
January 6, 1994	St. Louis	2	Hartford	1		Cleveland	OH	Richfield Coliseum	6,956
January 17, 1994	Detroit	6	Tampa Bay	3		Minneapolis	MN	Target Center	8,764
January 23, 1994	Vancouver	5	Edmonton	4	(OT)	Saskatoon	SK	Saskatchewan Place	N/A
January 24, 1994	Calgary	3	Los Angeles	3	(OT)	Phoenix	AZ	America West Arena	14,864
February 2, 1994	Washington	5	Philadelphia	2		Cleveland	OH	Richfield Coliseum	8,312
February 8, 1994	San Jose	4	Chicago	3		Sacramento	CA	ARCO Arena	14,182*
February 22, 1994	Florida	3	Winnipeg	2		Hamilton	ON	Copps Coliseum	6,291
February 24, 1994	Detroit	3	Hartford	0		Cleveland	OH	Richfield Coliseum	11,621
March 4, 1994	Winnipeg	6	Ottawa	1		Minneapolis	MN	Target Center	6,388
March 8, 1994	Chicago	3	Anaheim	0		Phoenix	AZ	America West Arena	13,847
March 9, 1994	NY Rangers	7	Washington	5		Halifax	NS	Halifax Metro Centre	9,200*
March 18, 1994	Buffalo	2	NY Islanders	2	(OT)	Minneapolis	MN	Target Center	8,016
March 23, 1994	Florida	1	Toronto	1	(OT)	Hamilton	ON	Copps Coliseum	17,096*
March 27, 1994	New Jersey	5	Quebec	2		Minneapolis	MN	Target Center	6,222
April 3, 1994	Pittsburgh	6	Boston	2		Cleveland	OH	Richfield Coliseum	17,224
April 3, 1994	Los Angeles	6	Edmonton	1		Sacramento	CA	ARCO Arena	10,363

=== All-Star Game ===
The All-Star Game was held in Madison Square Garden in New York City, home of the New York Rangers, on January 22, 1994. The conference-based all-star teams were renamed to reflect the league's new Eastern and Western conferences.

=== Highlights ===
The Panthers and Mighty Ducks set new records for first-year expansion teams. Both teams finished with 33 wins, surpassing the 31 wins of the Philadelphia Flyers and Los Angeles Kings in 1967–68. That mark would not be topped by another expansion team until the Vegas Golden Knights notched their 34th win in their inaugural season on February 1, 2018, finishing with 51. The Panthers also set a high-water mark in points, with 83 points, surpassing the previous record set by the Flyers' 73 points in 1967–68. The Golden Knights would eventually shatter this inaugural expansion team record by 26 points notching a total of 109 points in 2017–18. Wayne Gretzky became the all-time goal-scoring leader on March 23, 1994, surpassing Gordie Howe's record of 801 goals. The record would eventually be broken by Alexander Ovechkin on April 6, 2025.

=== Final standings ===
Atlantic Division
No.	CR		GP	W	L	T	GF	GA	Pts
1	1	**New York Rangers**	84	52	24	8	299	231	112
2	3	**New Jersey Devils**	84	47	25	12	306	220	106
3	7	**Washington Capitals**	84	39	35	10	277	263	88
4	8	**New York Islanders**	84	36	36	12	282	264	84
5	9	Florida Panthers	84	33	34	17	233	233	83
6	10	Philadelphia Flyers	84	35	39	10	294	314	80
7	12	Tampa Bay Lightning	84	30	43	11	224	251	71

Northeast Division
No.	CR		GP	W	L	T	GF	GA	Pts
1	2	**Pittsburgh Penguins**	84	44	27	13	299	285	101
2	4	**Boston Bruins**	84	42	29	13	289	252	97
3	5	**Montreal Canadiens**	84	41	29	14	283	248	96
4	6	**Buffalo Sabres**	84	43	32	9	282	218	95
5	11	Quebec Nordiques	84	34	42	8	277	292	76
6	13	Hartford Whalers	84	27	48	9	227	288	63
7	14	Ottawa Senators	84	14	61	9	201	397	37

Eastern Conference
R		GP	W	L	T	GF	GA	Pts
**1**	**p-New York Rangers ***	**84**	**52**	**24**	**8**	**299**	**231**	**112**
**2**	**x-Pittsburgh Penguins ***	**84**	**44**	**27**	**13**	**299**	**285**	**101**
**3**	**New Jersey Devils**	**84**	**47**	**25**	**12**	**306**	**220**	**106**
**4**	**Boston Bruins**	**84**	**42**	**29**	**13**	**289**	**252**	**97**
**5**	**Montreal Canadiens**	**84**	**41**	**29**	**14**	**283**	**248**	**96**
**6**	**Buffalo Sabres**	**84**	**43**	**32**	**9**	**282**	**218**	**95**
**7**	**Washington Capitals**	**84**	**39**	**35**	**10**	**277**	**263**	**88**
**8**	**New York Islanders**	**84**	**36**	**36**	**12**	**282**	**264**	**84**
9	Florida Panthers	84	33	34	17	233	233	83
10	Philadelphia Flyers	84	35	39	10	294	314	80
11	Quebec Nordiques	84	34	42	8	277	292	76
12	Tampa Bay Lightning	84	30	43	11	224	251	71
13	Hartford Whalers	84	27	48	9	227	288	63
14	Ottawa Senators	84	14	61	9	201	397	37

Final standings

bold – Qualified for playoffs; x – Won division; p – Won Presidents' Trophy (and division); * – Division leader

Central Division
No.	CR		GP	W	L	T	GF	GA	Pts
1	1	**Detroit Red Wings**	84	46	30	8	356	275	100
2	2	**Toronto Maple Leafs**	84	43	29	12	280	243	98
3	4	**Dallas Stars**	84	42	29	13	286	265	97
4	5	**St. Louis Blues**	84	40	33	11	270	283	91
5	6	**Chicago Blackhawks**	84	39	36	9	254	240	87
6	12	Winnipeg Jets	84	24	51	9	245	344	57

Pacific Division
No.	CR		GP	W	L	T	GF	GA	Pts
1	3	**Calgary Flames**	84	42	29	13	302	256	97
2	7	**Vancouver Canucks**	84	41	40	3	279	276	85
3	8	**San Jose Sharks**	84	33	35	16	252	265	82
4	9	Mighty Ducks of Anaheim	84	33	46	5	229	251	71
5	10	Los Angeles Kings	84	27	45	12	294	322	66
6	11	Edmonton Oilers	84	25	45	14	261	305	64

Western Conference
R		Div	GP	W	L	T	GF	GA	Pts
**1**	**y- Detroit Red Wings ***	**CEN**	**84**	**46**	**30**	**8**	**356**	**275**	**100**
**2**	**x- Calgary Flames ***	**PAC**	**84**	**42**	**29**	**13**	**302**	**256**	**97**
**3**	**Toronto Maple Leafs**	**CEN**	**84**	**43**	**29**	**12**	**280**	**243**	**98**
**4**	**Dallas Stars**	**CEN**	**84**	**42**	**29**	**13**	**286**	**265**	**97**
**5**	**St. Louis Blues**	**CEN**	**84**	**40**	**33**	**11**	**270**	**283**	**91**
**6**	**Chicago Blackhawks**	**CEN**	**84**	**39**	**36**	**9**	**254**	**240**	**87**
**7**	**Vancouver Canucks**	**PAC**	**84**	**41**	**40**	**3**	**279**	**276**	**85**
**8**	**San Jose Sharks**	**PAC**	**84**	**33**	**35**	**16**	**252**	**265**	**82**
9	Mighty Ducks of Anaheim	PAC	84	33	46	5	229	251	71
10	Los Angeles Kings	PAC	84	27	45	12	294	322	66
11	Edmonton Oilers	PAC	84	25	45	14	261	305	64
12	Winnipeg Jets	CEN	84	24	51	9	245	344	57

Divisions: CEN – Central, PAC – Pacific

bold – Qualified for playoffs; x – Won division; y – Won Conference (and division); * – Division leader No = Division rank, CR = Conference rank, W = Wins, L = Losses, T = Ties, GF = Goals For, GA = Goals Against, Pts = Points
Teams that qualified for the playoffs are highlighted in bold.

== Playoffs ==
=== Bracket ===
The top eight teams in each conference made the playoffs, with the two division winners seeded 1–2 based on regular season records, and the six remaining teams seeded 3–8. In each round, teams competed in a best-of-seven series (scores in the bracket indicate the number of games won in each best-of-seven series). The NHL used "re-seeding" instead of a fixed bracket playoff system. During the first three rounds, the highest remaining seed in each conference was matched against the lowest remaining seed, the second-highest remaining seed played the second-lowest remaining seed, and so forth. The higher-seeded team was awarded home-ice advantage. The two conference winners then advanced to the Stanley Cup Final.

Conference quarterfinals	Conference semifinals
1	NY Rangers	4
8	NY Islanders	0
1	NY Rangers	4
7	Washington	1
2	Pittsburgh	2
7	Washington	4
Eastern Conference
3	New Jersey	4
6	Buffalo	3
3	New Jersey	4
4	Boston	2
4	Boston	4
5	Montreal	3
1	Detroit	3
8	San Jose	4
3	Toronto	4
8	San Jose	3
2	Calgary	3
7	Vancouver	4
Western Conference
3	Toronto	4
6	Chicago	2
4	Dallas	1
7	Vancouver	4
4	Dallas	4
5	St. Louis	0

Conference finals
1	NY Rangers	4
3	New Jersey	3
3	Toronto	1
7	Vancouver	4

Stanley Cup Final
E1	NY Rangers	4
W7	Vancouver	3

== Awards ==
The NHL awards presentation took place on June 16, 1994.

1993–94 NHL awards
Award	Recipient(s)	Runner(s)-up/Finalists
Presidents' Trophy (Best regular-season record)	New York Rangers	New Jersey Devils
Prince of Wales Trophy (Eastern Conference playoff champion)	New York Rangers	New Jersey Devils
Clarence S. Campbell Bowl (Western Conference playoff champion)	Vancouver Canucks	Toronto Maple Leafs
Alka-Seltzer Plus-Minus Award (Best plus-minus statistic)	Scott Stevens (New Jersey Devils)	Sergei Fedorov (Detroit Red Wings)
Art Ross Trophy (Player with most points)	Wayne Gretzky (Los Angeles Kings)	Sergei Fedorov (Detroit Red Wings)
Bill Masterton Memorial Trophy (Perseverance, sportsmanship, and dedication)	Cam Neely (Boston Bruins)	N/A
Calder Memorial Trophy (Best first-year player)	Martin Brodeur (New Jersey Devils)	Jason Arnott (Edmonton Oilers); Mikael Renberg (Philadelphia Flyers)
Conn Smythe Trophy (Most valuable player, playoffs)	Brian Leetch (New York Rangers)	N/A
Frank J. Selke Trophy (Best defensive forward)	Sergei Fedorov (Detroit Red Wings)	Doug Gilmour (Toronto Maple Leafs); Brian Skrudland (Florida Panthers)
Hart Memorial Trophy (Most valuable player, regular season)	Sergei Fedorov (Detroit Red Wings)	Dominik Hasek (Buffalo Sabres); John Vanbiesbrouck (Florida Panthers)
Jack Adams Award (Best coach)	Jacques Lemaire (New Jersey Devils)	Kevin Constantine (San Jose Sharks); John Muckler (Buffalo Sabres)
James Norris Memorial Trophy (Best defenceman)	Ray Bourque (Boston Bruins)	Al MacInnis (Calgary Flames); Scott Stevens (New Jersey Devils)
King Clancy Memorial Trophy (Leadership and humanitarian contribution)	Adam Graves (New York Rangers)	N/A
Lady Byng Memorial Trophy (Sportsmanship and excellence)	Wayne Gretzky (Los Angeles Kings)	Adam Oates (Boston Bruins); Pierre Turgeon (New York Islanders)
Lester B. Pearson Award (Outstanding player)	Sergei Fedorov (Detroit Red Wings)	N/A
Vezina Trophy (Best goaltender)	Dominik Hasek (Buffalo Sabres)	Patrick Roy (Montreal Canadiens); John Vanbiesbrouck (Florida Panthers)
William M. Jennings Trophy (Goaltender(s) of team with fewest goals against)	Dominik Hasek and Grant Fuhr (Buffalo Sabres)	Martin Brodeur and Chris Terreri (New Jersey Devils)

=== All-Star teams ===
First team	Position	Second team
Dominik Hasek, Buffalo Sabres	G	John Vanbiesbrouck, Florida Panthers
Ray Bourque, Boston Bruins	D	Al MacInnis, Calgary Flames
Scott Stevens, New Jersey Devils	D	Brian Leetch, New York Rangers
Sergei Fedorov, Detroit Red Wings	C	Wayne Gretzky, Los Angeles Kings
Pavel Bure, Vancouver Canucks	RW	Cam Neely, Boston Bruins
Brendan Shanahan, St. Louis Blues	LW	Adam Graves, New York Rangers

== Player statistics ==
=== Scoring leaders ===
Player	Team	GP	G	A	Pts
Wayne Gretzky	Los Angeles	81	38	92	130
Sergei Fedorov	Detroit	82	56	64	120
Adam Oates	Boston	77	32	80	112
Doug Gilmour	Toronto	83	27	84	111
Pavel Bure	Vancouver	76	60	47	107
Jeremy Roenick	Chicago	84	46	61	107
Mark Recchi	Philadelphia	84	40	67	107
Brendan Shanahan	St. Louis	81	52	50	102
Dave Andreychuk	Toronto	83	53	46	99
Jaromir Jagr	Pittsburgh	80	32	67	99

=== Leading goaltenders ===
Player	Team	GP	MIN	GA	SO	GAA	SV%
Dominik Hasek	Buffalo	58	3358	109	7	1.95	.930
Martin Brodeur	New Jersey	47	2625	105	3	2.40	.915
Patrick Roy	Montreal	68	3867	161	7	2.50	.918
John Vanbiesbrouck	Florida	57	3440	145	1	2.53	.924
Mike Richter	New York Rangers	68	3710	159	5	2.57	.910
Darcy Wakaluk	Dallas	36	2000	88	3	2.64	.910
Ed Belfour	Chicago	70	3998	178	7	2.67	.906
Daren Puppa	Tampa Bay	63	3653	165	4	2.71	.899
Chris Terreri	New Jersey	44	2340	106	2	2.72	.907
Mark Fitzpatrick	Florida	15	819	36	2	2.73	.914

== Milestones ==
=== Debuts ===
The following is a list of players of note who played their first NHL game in 1993–94 (listed with their first team, asterisk(*) marks debut in playoffs):

- Chris Osgood, Detroit Red Wings
- Jason Arnott, Edmonton Oilers
- Kirk Maltby, Edmonton Oilers
- Rob Niedermayer, Florida Panthers
- Chris Pronger, Hartford Whalers
- Donald Brashear, Montreal Canadiens
- Jason Smith, New Jersey Devils
- Zigmund Palffy, New York Islanders
- Mattias Norstrom, New York Rangers
- Todd Marchant, New York Rangers
- Alexandre Daigle, Ottawa Senators
- Alexei Yashin, Ottawa Senators
- Pavol Demitra, Ottawa Senators
- Markus Naslund, Pittsburgh Penguins
- Jocelyn Thibault, Quebec Nordiques
- Ian Laperriere, St. Louis Blues
- Chris Gratton, Tampa Bay Lightning
- Yanic Perreault, Toronto Maple Leafs
- Michael Peca, Vancouver Canucks
- Jason Allison, Washington Capitals

=== Last games ===
The following is a list of players of note who played their last game in the NHL in 1993–94 (listed with their last team):

- Gordie Roberts, Boston Bruins
- Dave Christian, Chicago Blackhawks
- Michel Goulet, Chicago Blackhawks
- Mike Foligno, Florida Panthers
- Brian Propp, Hartford Whalers
- Dave Taylor, Los Angeles Kings
- Keith Acton, New York Islanders
- Rob Ramage, Philadelphia Flyers
- Bryan Trottier, Pittsburgh Penguins

== Coaches ==
=== Eastern Conference ===
Team	Coach	Comments
Boston Bruins	Brian Sutter	
Buffalo Sabres	John Muckler	
Florida Panthers	Roger Neilson	
Hartford Whalers	Pierre McGuire	Elevated to head coach midseason after Paul Holmgren stepped down.
Montreal Canadiens	Jacques Demers	
New Jersey Devils	Jacques Lemaire	
New York Islanders	Al Arbour	
New York Rangers	Mike Keenan	
Ottawa Senators	Rick Bowness	
Philadelphia Flyers	Terry Simpson	
Pittsburgh Penguins	Eddie Johnston	
Quebec Nordiques	Pierre Page	
Tampa Bay Lightning	Terry Crisp	
Washington Capitals	Terry Murray	Replaced late in the season by Jim Schoenfeld

=== Western Conference ===
Team	Coach	Comments
Mighty Ducks of Anaheim	Ron Wilson	
Calgary Flames	Dave King	
Chicago Blackhawks	Darryl Sutter	
Dallas Stars	Bob Gainey	
Detroit Red Wings	Scotty Bowman	
Edmonton Oilers	Ted Green	Replaced early in the season by Glen Sather
Los Angeles Kings	Barry Melrose	
St. Louis Blues	Bob Berry	
San Jose Sharks	Kevin Constantine	
Toronto Maple Leafs	Pat Burns	
Vancouver Canucks	Pat Quinn	
Winnipeg Jets	John Paddock	

== Broadcasting ==
=== Canada ===
This was the sixth season of the league's Canadian national broadcast rights deals with TSN and Hockey Night in Canada on CBC. This was the last regular season before Saturday night doubleheaders became permanent on HNIC on CBC. TSN televised selected regular season weeknight games. Coverage of the Stanley Cup playoffs was primarily on CBC, with TSN airing first round all-U.S. series.

=== United States ===
This was the second season of ESPN's deal for U.S. national broadcast rights, while NBC televised the All-Star Game for the fifth and final consecutive season.

ESPN's weekly regular season games were generally broadcast on Wednesdays and Fridays. ESPN also had Sunday games between the NFL and baseball seasons. ESPN2 also began showing up to five games per week, branded as NHL Fire on Ice.

ESPN's brokered deal with sister broadcast network ABC expanded to include weekly regional telecasts on the last three Sunday afternoons of the regular season. This marked the first time that regular season NHL games were broadcast on American network television since 1974–75. ABC then televised playoff games on first three Sundays of the postseason. ESPN and ESPN2 televised selected first and second-round games. ESPN then had the Conference finals and the Stanley Cup Final.

After the season, the NHL reached a five-year deal with Fox, replacing ABC and NBC as the league's U.S. broadcast television partner.

== See also ==
- List of Stanley Cup champions
- 1993 NHL entry draft
- 1993 NHL expansion draft
- 1993 NHL supplemental draft
- 1993-94 NHL transactions
- 45th National Hockey League All-Star Game
- National Hockey League All-Star Game
- NHL All-Rookie Team
- Lester Patrick Trophy
- Ice hockey at the 1994 Winter Olympics
- 1993 in sports
- 1994 in sports
