= Antero Niittymäki =

Finnish ice hockey player (born 1980)

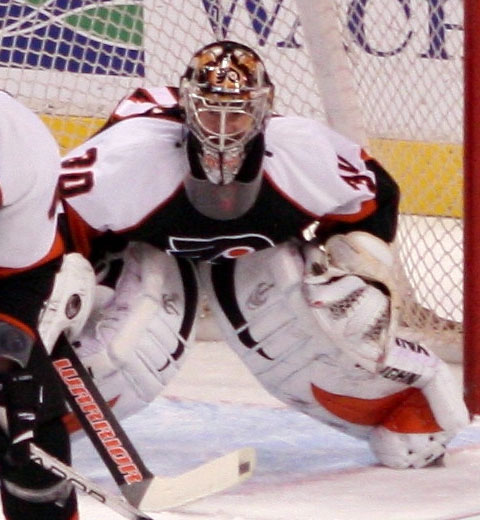
- Niittymäki with the Philadelphia Flyers in 2009
- Born: June 18, 1980 (age 46) Turku, Finland
- Height: 6 ft 1 in (185 cm)
- Weight: 190 lb (86 kg; 13 st 8 lb)
- Position: Goaltender
- Caught: Left
- Played for: TPS; Philadelphia Flyers; Tampa Bay Lightning; San Jose Sharks
- National team: Finland
- NHL draft: 168th overall, 1998; Philadelphia Flyers
- Playing career: 1999–2013

Antero Pertti Elias Niittymäki (Finnish pronunciation: [ˈɑntero ˈniːtːymæki]; born June 18, 1980) is a Finnish former professional ice hockey goaltender who last played for TPS of the SM-liiga (Finnish elite league). He additionally played in the National Hockey League (NHL) with the Philadelphia Flyers, Tampa Bay Lightning and San Jose Sharks. At the 2006 Winter Olympics, while playing for Team Finland, he was voted the Most Valuable Player (MVP) of the entire ice hockey tournament.

Partway through his four-year junior career with TPS in the junior SM-liiga, Niittymäki was selected by the Flyers 168th overall in the 1998 NHL entry draft. He continued to play in Finland with TPS for his first year out of the junior leagues, and he won the Finnish elite league's Rookie of the Year trophy. After two more seasons with TPS, Niittymäki moved to North America to join the Philadelphia Phantoms in the American Hockey League (AHL). When the Phantoms won the AHL Calder Cup championship, he was named the MVP of the playoffs. He then played four seasons for the Philadelphia Flyers before signing as a free agent with the Tampa Bay Lightning. One year later, he signed as a free agent with the San Jose Sharks, but he did not play many games for them over the next two years due to hip injuries. He played his final season with his youth team TPS, and he announced his retirement in 2013.

== Playing career ==
=== Early career ===
From 1995 to 2002, Niittymäki played for TPS in the SM-liiga (Finnish elite league), playing in the junior SM-liiga prior to 1999. In 2000, he won the Jarmo Wasama memorial trophy for Rookie of the Year, and led TPS to their second straight SM-liiga championship.

Niittymäki was the Philadelphia Flyers' 6th-round pick (168th overall) in the 1998 NHL entry draft. "I didn't even know I got drafted. I found out the next morning. I was really surprised," he said in an interview in November 2003. Even if he had opted to go immediately to the United States to play hockey, compulsory military service kept Niittymäki in Finland until January 2001. He would return to TPS in 2002 for his final season, playing 14 games.

From 2002 to 2005, Niittymäki played for the Flyers in the NHL and the Philadelphia Phantoms, the Flyers' American Hockey League affiliate. Niittymäki was successful in the AHL. He was named the Sher-Wood AHL Player of the Week for the week ending on November 23, 2003, after posting a 0.41 GAA and .984 SP. He played for PlanetUSA in the 2005 AHL All-Star Game. The Phantoms organization gave out Antero Niittymäki bobbleheads on February 27, 2005 and Niittymäki figurines on March 3, 2006.

Niittymäki scored a game-winning, empty net, overtime, shorthanded, unassisted goal on April 11, 2004, versus the Hershey Bears. The game ended 3–2, with Niittymäki recording 32 saves as well, which finished the 12–0 Philadelphia season sweep of the Bears.

The Phantoms won the Calder Cup in 2005 after sweeping the Chicago Wolves. Niittymäki received the Jack A. Butterfield Trophy for being the MVP in the Calder Cup Playoffs. He had a 1.75 GAA and 15 wins, three of which were shutouts.

=== NHL ===
Niittymäki played three games for the Flyers in February 2004. He was allowed to play after Robert Esche was injured and Jeff Hackett was forced to retire because of vertigo. He won all three games, posting a 1.00 GAA, against the Washington Capitals, Atlanta Thrashers and New Jersey Devils. His starting stint ended after the Flyers acquired Sean Burke from the Phoenix Coyotes. Upon Esche's recovery, Burke took over the backup job and Niittymäki was sent back down to the Phantoms.

Niittymäki started the 2005–06 season as the Flyers' backup goalie for Esche. On October 14, 2005, Niittymäki let in a questionable goal immediately after a faceoff on the Pittsburgh Penguins' side of center ice. He was watching a JumboTron replay when Maxime Talbot softly shot at him and scored.

While Esche was on the injury list, Niittymäki got the opportunity to start with Jamie Storr being his backup goalie. Niittymäki started seventeen consecutive games while Esche was unable to play. He recorded his first NHL shutout and assist/point during this time. He was named the NHL Defensive Player of the week for the week ending on 8 January 2006.

The 2006–07 NHL season revolved around injuries for Niittymäki. He suffered a torn labrum injury to his left hip during training camp. Doctors decided to try giving him cortisone shots to postpone surgery, which would have sidelined him for 6–8 weeks. The first shot allowed him to get back on the ice for the start of the season, but by late December he needed another shot. Despite this, he managed to take over the starting goaltender position from Esche, after Esche fell out with the coaching staff and management. However, Philadelphia acquired Martin Biron and he was given the starting position for the rest of the year. Niittymäki finally had hip surgery in summer 2008. He continued to play backup goaltender for the Flyers for the next two seasons (07–08 and 08–09), setting a franchise record for most saves in a game in January 2008.

The 2009 NHL offseason marked the first time in Niittymäki's NHL playing career that he was an unrestricted free agent. After the Philadelphia Flyers acquired goaltenders Ray Emery and Brian Boucher, Niittymäki signed with the Tampa Bay Lightning as a backup goalie for Mike Smith, however, he started many games, while Smith struggled with injuries.

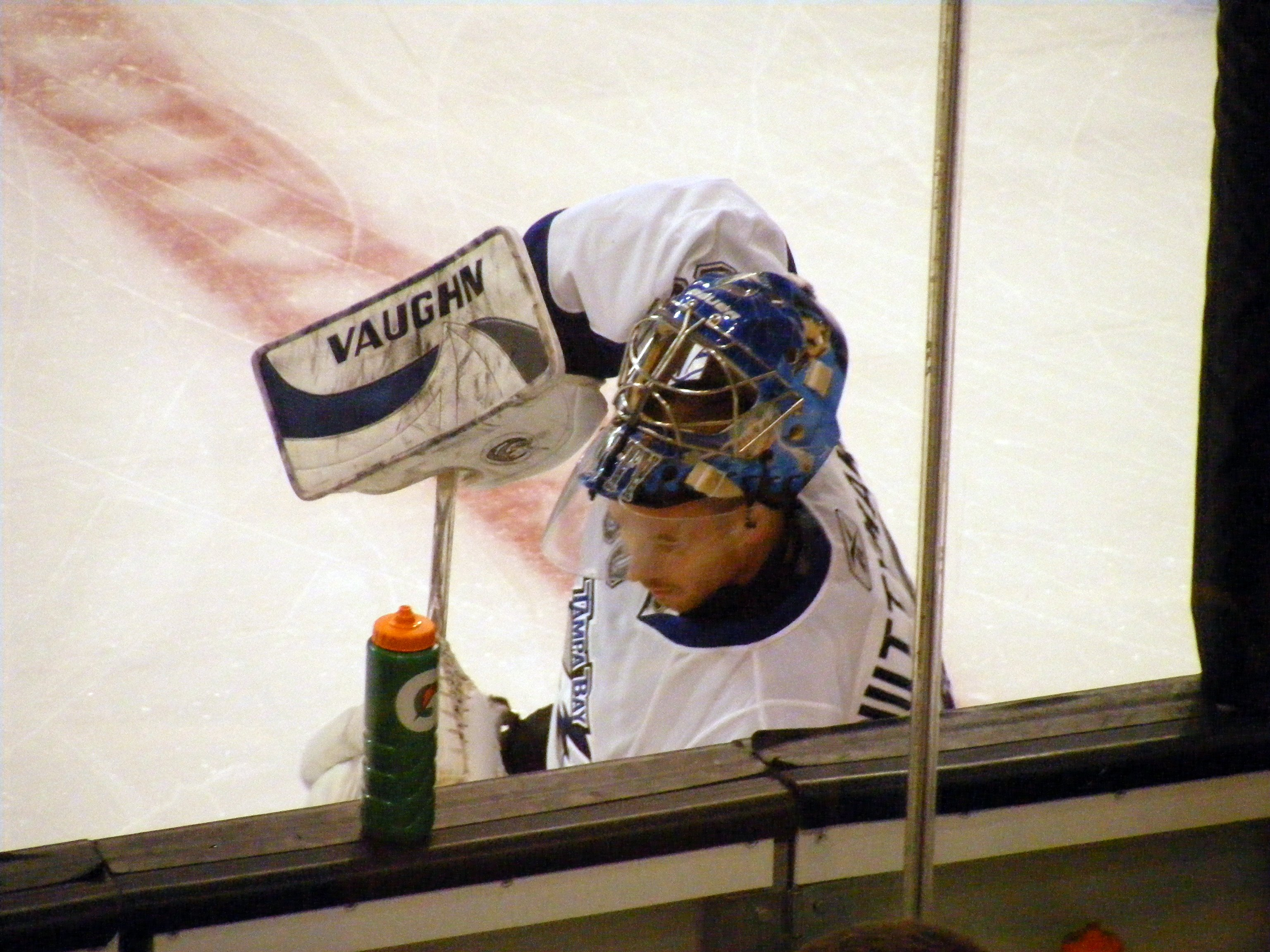
Niittymäki with the Lightning

Niittymäki started his 2009–2010 season with great success; after his first ten games, he led the league in both save percentage (.939) and goals against average (1.93). Niittymäki won four straight games in February 2010, something that had not occurred for Tampa Bay since two and a half years prior, when the team won five straight in the 2007–08 season (November). On March 25, 2010, Niittymäki won his 20th game in the season and the Tampa Bay Lightning's 500th franchise victory, while setting his second NHL franchise record for most saves in a game. Niittymäki extended his lifetime winning streak against the Atlanta Thrashers to 17 wins on March 6, 2010.

On the first day of free agency in summer 2010, Niittymäki was signed to replace long time San Jose Sharks goaltender Evgeni Nabokov because of salary cap considerations. Niittymäki played strongly at the beginning of the season, earning the Sharks Player of the Month award in October. However, he sustained another lower body injury, resulting in him missing 17 games, during which Antti Niemi solidified his standing as the starting goaltender. Before his second year in San Jose, Niittymäki had hip surgery. During his recovery process, he played a few games with the Sharks' AHL affiliate, the Worcester Sharks. He was ultimately loaned to the AHL's Syracuse Crunch for the rest of the season, but he only played eight games.

== Post-playing career ==
On April 12, 2013, Niittymäki announced he was forced to retire because of recurring hip-problems. Niittymäki was hired by the Philadelphia Flyers in June 2013 as a European goaltender scout.

== International play ==
Medal record

Men's ice hockey

Representing Finland

Olympic Games
Silver medal – second place	2006 Turin	
Bronze medal – third place	2010 Vancouver	

World Championships
Bronze medal – third place	2006 Latvia	

Niittymäki was named to the Team Finland for the 2006 Winter Olympics after Kari Lehtonen and Miikka Kiprusoff had to pull out due to injuries. Despite being a relative unknown with little top-level experience, he put in a stellar performance and was named the MVP of the tournament after posting 3 shutouts in 6 games, leading Finland to the silver medal.

Niittymäki played for Finland in the 2006 IIHF World Championships until the last game of the qualifying round against Canada, in which he got injured and was replaced by the team's reserve goalie Fredrik Norrena.

In the 2010 Winter Olympics Niittymäki was selected to the team as Finland's third goalie, behind Miikka Kiprusoff and Niklas Bäckström. However he did not see any action during the tournament.

== Awards ==
- 2000: Jarmo Wasama Memorial Trophy
- Kanada-malja championship: TPS, 2000 and 2001
- Sher-Wood AHL Player of the Week – week ending on 16 November 2003
- Philadelphia Phantoms Toyota Player of the Month for January, March, November 2004
- 2005: Played in AHL All-Star Game
- Calder Cup championship: Philadelphia Phantoms, 2005
- 2005: Jack A. Butterfield Trophy
- 2005: Phantoms All Decade Second Team
- NHL Defensive Player of the Week – week ending on 8 January 2006 - shared with David Aebischer
- 2006 Winter Olympics men's ice hockey Most Valuable Player and member of the media All-Star team
- San Jose Sharks Player of the Month for October 2010

== Records ==
Type	Record	Details	Date	
North American pro-hockey	First goaltender to record an overtime goal		April 11, 2004	
Philadelphia Phantoms' franchise	First goal by a goaltender		April 11, 2004	
Philadelphia Phantoms' franchise	Lowest career GAA	2.19 GAA		
Philadelphia Phantoms' franchise	Lowest GAA during the postseason	1.75 GAA	2005	
Philadelphia Phantoms' franchise	Most saves in a period during a playoff game	23 saves, 1st period	April 29, 2005	
Philadelphia Phantoms' franchise	Most saves in the postseason	611 saves	2005	
Philadelphia Phantoms' franchise	Most shutouts in a season	7 shutouts	2003–04	
Philadelphia Phantoms' franchise	Most shutouts in the postseason	3 shutouts, tied with Neil Little	2005	
Philadelphia Phantoms' franchise	Most wins by a goalie in a season	33 wins	2004–05	
National Hockey League	Most consecutive wins against a single team	17 against the Atlanta Thrashers tied with Chris Osgood	February 5, 2004 - October 10, 2010	
Philadelphia Flyers' franchise	Most saves in a game	54 saves	January 5, 2008	
Philadelphia Flyers' franchise	First shootout win		December 6, 2005	
Philadelphia Flyers' franchise	Most losses by a goalie in a season	29 losses tied with Bernie Parent	2006–07	[ref]

== Transactions ==
Transaction	Date
Drafted by Philadelphia as their 6th-round pick (168th overall)	June 27, 1998
Signed as an unrestricted free agent by Tampa Bay	July 10, 2009
Signed as a free agent by San Jose for two years	July 1, 2010

== Career statistics ==
=== Regular season and playoffs ===
			Regular season										Playoffs
Season	Team	League	GP	W	L	T	OTL	MIN	GA	SO	GAA	SV%	GP	W	L	MIN	GA	SO	GAA	SV%
1996–97	TPS	FIN U18	—	—	—	—	—	—	—	—	—	—	—	—	—	—	—	—	—	—
1997–98	TPS	FIN U18	—	—	—	—	—	—	—	—	—	—	1	—	—	60	1	0	1.00	—
1997–98	TPS	FIN U20	19	10	8	1	—	1131	34	—	1.80	.927	4	3	1	220	7	0	1.91	.929
1998–99	TPS	FIN U20	35	27	8	0	—	2095	60	3	1.72	.924	6	3	3	362	14	0	2.32	.905
1999–00	TPS	FIN U20	1	1	0	0	—	60	1	0	1.00	.962	1	0	1	60	5	0	5.00	.886
1999–00	TPS	SM-l	32	23	6	3	—	1899	68	3	2.15	.930	8	6	2	453	13	0	1.72	.944
2000–01	TPS	SM-l	21	10	5	1	—	1112	46	2	2.48	.907	—	—	—	—	—	—	—	—
2000–01	TPS	FIN U20	—	—	—	—	—	—	—	—	—	—	2	1	1	120	4	1	2.00	.939
2001–02	TPS	SM-l	27	16	8	1	—	1498	46	3	1.84	.937	4	2	2	295	11	0	2.23	.926
2002–03	Philadelphia Phantoms	AHL	40	14	21	2	—	2283	98	0	2.58	.903	—	—	—	—	—	—	—	—
2003–04	Philadelphia Flyers	NHL	3	3	0	0	—	180	3	0	1.00	.961	—	—	—	—	—	—	—	—
2003–04	Philadelphia Phantoms	AHL	49	24	13	6	—	2728	92	7	2.02	.924	12	6	6	796	24	0	1.81	.926
2004–05	Philadelphia Phantoms	AHL	58	33	21	4	—	3453	119	6	2.07	.924	21	15	5	1269	37	3	1.75	.943
2005–06	Philadelphia Flyers	NHL	46	23	15	—	6	2690	133	2	2.97	.895	2	0	0	72	5	0	4.11	.828
2006–07	Philadelphia Flyers	NHL	52	9	29	—	9	2942	166	0	3.38	.894	—	—	—	—	—	—	—	—
2007–08	Philadelphia Flyers	NHL	28	12	9	—	2	1424	69	1	2.91	.907	—	—	—	—	—	—	—	—
2008–09	Philadelphia Flyers	NHL	32	15	8	—	6	1804	83	1	2.76	.912	—	—	—	—	—	—	—	—
2009–10	Tampa Bay Lightning	NHL	49	21	18	—	5	2657	127	1	2.87	.909	—	—	—	—	—	—	—	—
2010–11	San Jose Sharks	NHL	24	12	7	—	3	1414	64	0	2.72	.896	2	1	0	91	1	0	0.66	.967
2011–12	Worcester Sharks	AHL	5	2	3	—	0	299	15	0	3.01	.890	—	—	—	—	—	—	—	—
2011–12	Syracuse Crunch	AHL	8	2	5	—	0	385	26	0	4.05	.867	—	—	—	—	—	—	—	—
2012–13	TPS	SM-l	14	1	7	—	3	720	34	0	2.83	.902	—	—	—	—	—	—	—	—
SM-l totals			94	50	26	5	3	5229	194	8	2.23	—	12	8	4	748	24	1	1.93	—
NHL totals			234	95	86	0	31	13,113	645	5	2.95	.902	4	1	0	164	6	0	2.19	.898

=== International ===
Year	Team	Event	GP	W	L	T	MIN	GA	SO	GAA	SV%
1998	Finland	EJC	1	—	—	—	60	4	0	4.00	.867
2000	Finland	WJC	5	—	—	—	245	10	0	2.45	.895
2006	Finland	OG	6	5	1	0	359	8	3	1.34	.951
2006	Finland	WC	4	2	1	1	212	6	2	1.70	.927
Senior totals			10	7	2	1	571	14	5	1.53	.943

Statistics source:

Preceded by Timo Pärssinen	Winner of the Jarmo Wasama memorial trophy 1999–2000	Succeeded by Toni Dahlman
Preceded by Wade Flaherty	Winner of the Jack A. Butterfield Trophy; 2004–05	Succeeded by Frédéric Cassivi
