= List of Philadelphia Flyers records =

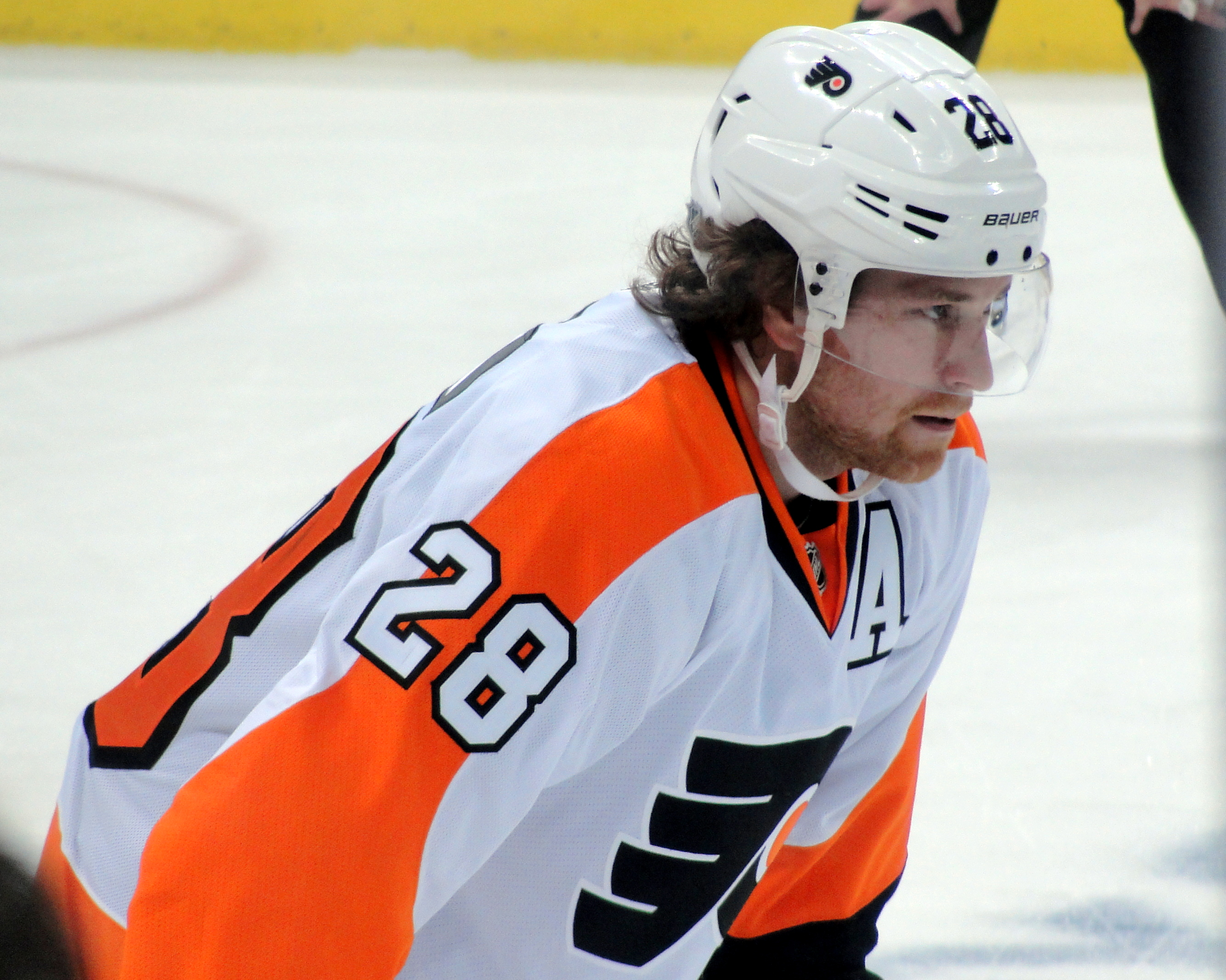
Claude Giroux, pictured here during an April 13, 2012 playoff game, set a team record during the game for most points in a single playoff game.

The Philadelphia Flyers are a professional ice hockey team based in Philadelphia, Pennsylvania. They are members of the Metropolitan Division of the National Hockey League's (NHL) Eastern Conference. The Flyers were founded in 1967 as one of six expansion teams, increasing the size of the NHL at that time to 12 teams.

== Key ==
Key of colors, symbols, and abbreviations
Color/symbol/abbreviation	Explanation
^{†}	NHL record
^{‡}	Tied for NHL record
Ref	References

== Career ==
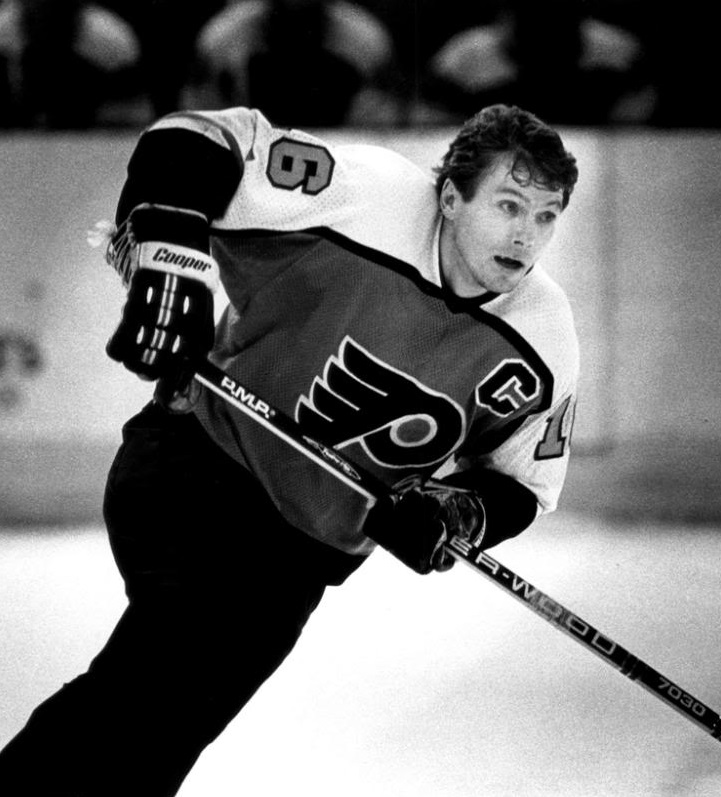
Bobby Clarke holds the franchise regular season and playoff records for seasons played, games played, assists, and points.

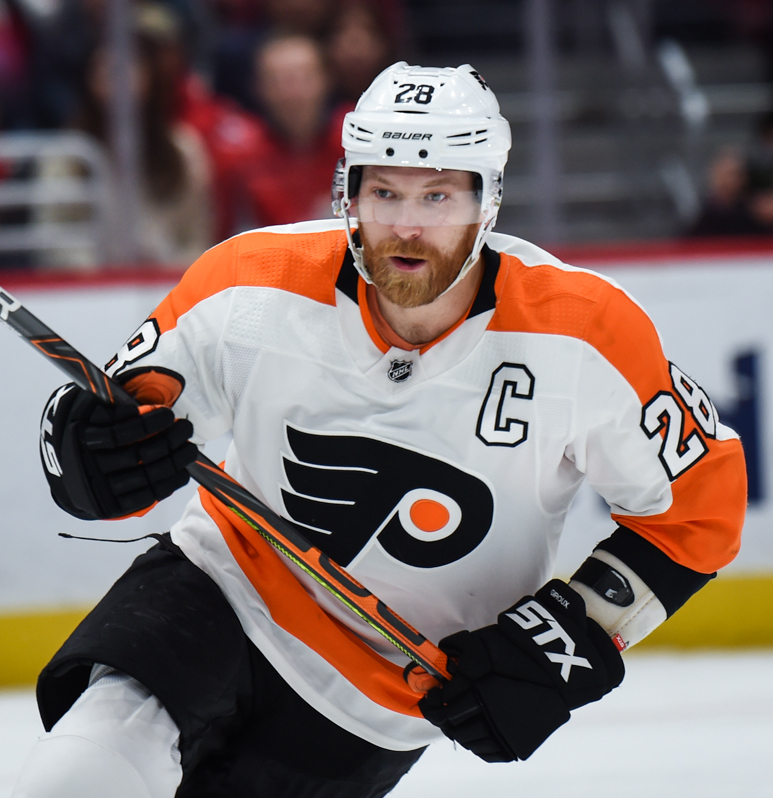
In his record-tying 15th season with the Flyers, Claude Giroux became the second Flyer to reach 1,000 games played for the team before his trade to the Florida Panthers. He has scored the most overtime and shootout goals in franchise history.

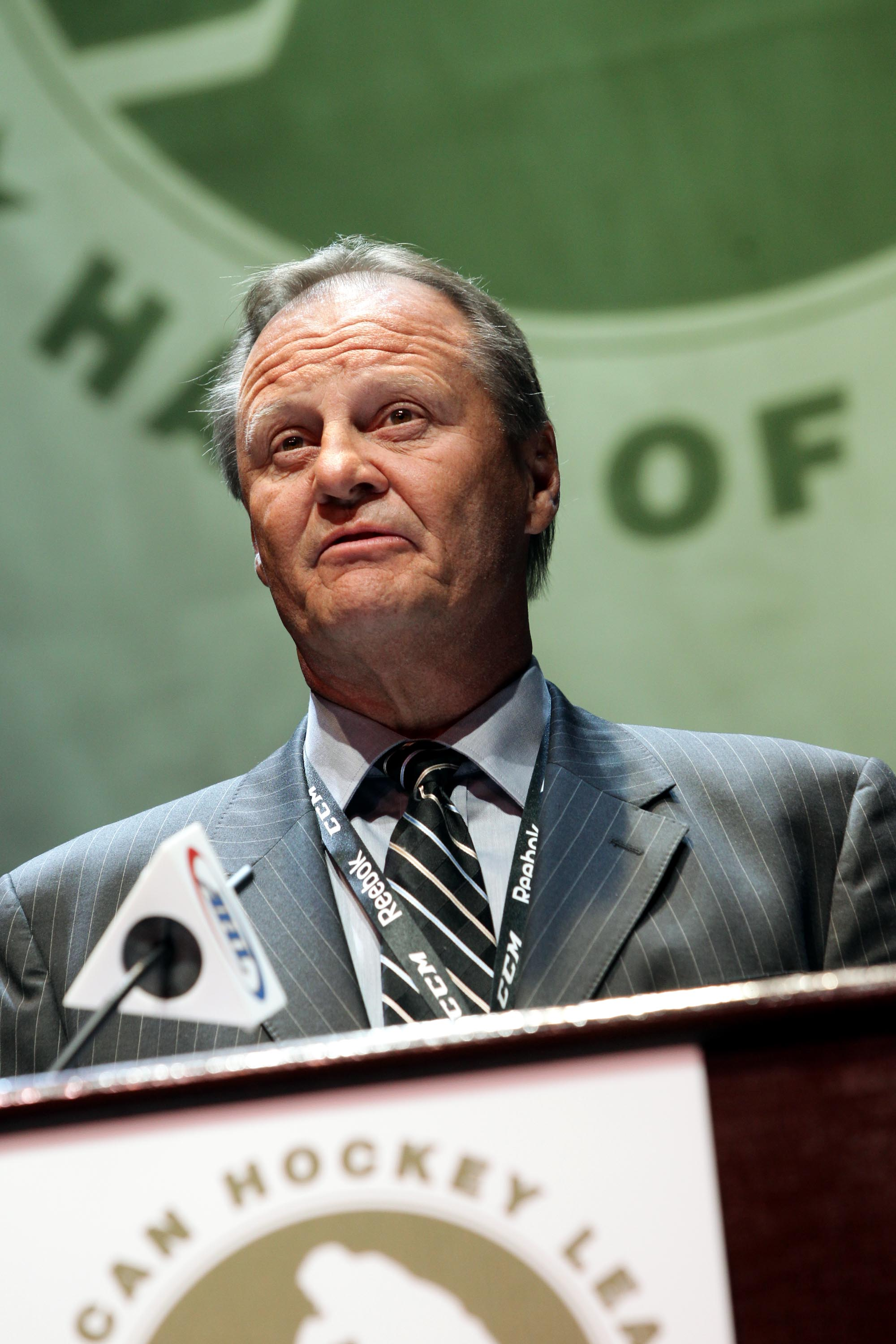
Bill Barber holds the franchise career regular season record and is tied for the career playoff record in goals scored.

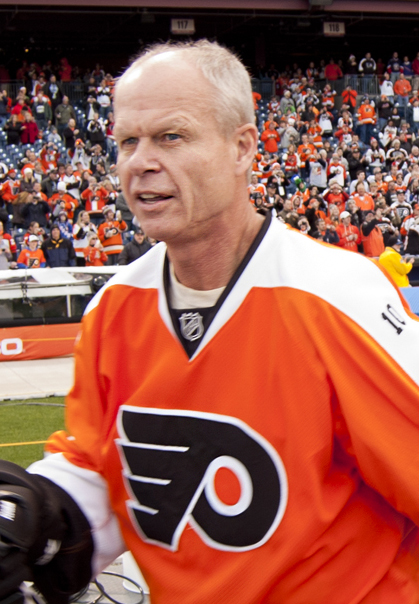
Mark Howe holds the team records for most career regular season goals, assists, and points by a defenseman.

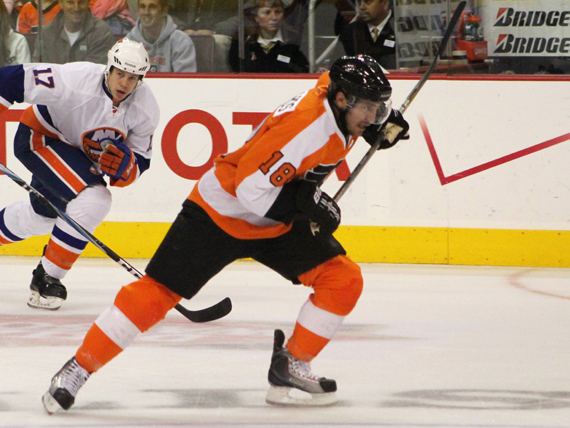
Mike Richards holds the NHL career record for most 3-on-5 shorthanded goals scored. He's also one of only two Flyers to score a penalty shot goal in a playoff game.

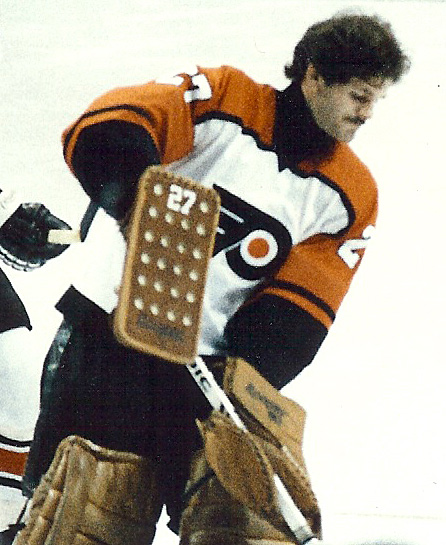
Ron Hextall holds the franchise regular season and playoff records for games played by a goalie, wins, and losses.

Regular season
Record	Total	Holder	Ref
Seasons	15	Bobby Clarke	
Seasons	15	Sean Couturier	
Seasons	15	Claude Giroux	
Games	1,144	Bobby Clarke	
Goals	420	Bill Barber	
Goals (defenseman)	138	Mark Howe	
Goals per game	.60	Tim Kerr	
Goals per game	.60	Eric Lindros	
Powerplay goals	144	Tim Kerr	
Powerplay goals (defenseman)	39	Eric Desjardins	
Powerplay goals (defenseman)	39	Mark Howe	
Shorthanded goals	32	Bobby Clarke	
Shorthanded goals (3-on-5)	3^{†} (Note: Richards did not score any additional 3-on-5 shorthanded goals during his stints with the Los Angeles Kings and Washington Capitals.)	Mike Richards	
Game-winning goals	61	John LeClair	
Overtime goals	11	Claude Giroux	
Penalty shot goals	3	Simon Gagne	
Shootout goals	30	Claude Giroux	
Assists	852	Bobby Clarke	
Assists (defenseman)	342	Mark Howe	
Assists per game	.85	Peter Forsberg	
Points	1,210	Bobby Clarke	
Points (defenseman)	480	Mark Howe	
Points per game	1.36	Eric Lindros	
Penalty minutes	1,815	Rick Tocchet	
Highest plus-minus	+507	Bobby Clarke	
Lowest plus-minus	–78	Wayne Simmonds	
Shots on goal	3,246	Bill Barber	
Hat tricks	17	Tim Kerr	
20-goal seasons	12	Bill Barber	
30-goal seasons	9	Bill Barber	
40-goal seasons	5	Bill Barber	
40-goal seasons	5	Tim Kerr	
40-goal seasons	5	John LeClair	
50-goal seasons	4	Tim Kerr	
60-goal seasons	1	Reggie Leach	
100-point seasons	3	Bobby Clarke	
Seasons (goaltender)	11	Ron Hextall	
Games (goaltender)	489	Ron Hextall	
Wins	240	Ron Hextall	
Losses	172	Ron Hextall	
Ties	102	Bernie Parent	
Shutouts	50	Bernie Parent	
Minutes played	28,215	Bernie Parent	
Goals against average	1.96	Roman Cechmanek	
Save percentage	.923	Roman Cechmanek	
Goals against	1,367	Ron Hextall	
Goals (goaltender)	1	Ron Hextall	
Assists (goaltender)	27	Ron Hextall	
Points (goaltender)	28	Ron Hextall	
Penalty minutes (goaltender)	461 (Note: When his time with the 1992–93 Quebec Nordiques and 1993–94 New York Islanders is included, Hextall holds the NHL career record for penalty minutes for a goaltender in both the regular season (569) and playoffs (115).)	Ron Hextall	
Playoffs
Record	Total	Holder	Ref
Seasons	13	Bobby Clarke	
Games	136	Bobby Clarke	
Goals	53	Bill Barber	
Goals	53	Rick MacLeish	
Goals (defenseman)	14	Eric Desjardins	
Goals per game	.54	Danny Briere	
Powerplay goals	21	Rick MacLeish	
Powerplay goals (defenseman)	6	Doug Crossman	
Shorthanded goals	5	Bill Barber	
Shorthanded goals	5	Dave Poulin	
Game-winning goals	10	Rick MacLeish	
Overtime goals	3	Bobby Clarke	
Penalty shot goals	1	Eric Lindros	
Penalty shot goals	1	Mike Richards	
Assists	77	Bobby Clarke	
Assists (defenseman)	45	Mark Howe	
Assists per game	1.02	Ken Linseman	
Points	119	Bobby Clarke	
Points (defenseman)	53	Mark Howe	
Points per game	1.29	Ken Linseman	
Penalty minutes	363	Dave Schultz	
Highest plus-minus	+48	Jimmy Watson	
Lowest plus-minus	–15	Doug Crossman	
Shots on goal	467	Bill Barber	
Hat tricks	3	Tim Kerr	
Hat tricks	3	Rick MacLeish	
Seasons (goaltender)	7	Ron Hextall	
Seasons (goaltender)	7	Bernie Parent	
Games (goaltender)	84	Ron Hextall	
Wins	45	Ron Hextall	
Losses	36	Ron Hextall	
Shutouts	6	Bernie Parent	
Minutes played	4,928	Ron Hextall	
Goals against average	2.33	Roman Cechmanek	
Save percentage	.916	Bernie Parent	
Goals against	242	Ron Hextall	
Goals (goaltender)	1^{‡}	Ron Hextall	
Penalty minutes (goaltender)	111	Ron Hextall	

== Single season ==
=== Player ===
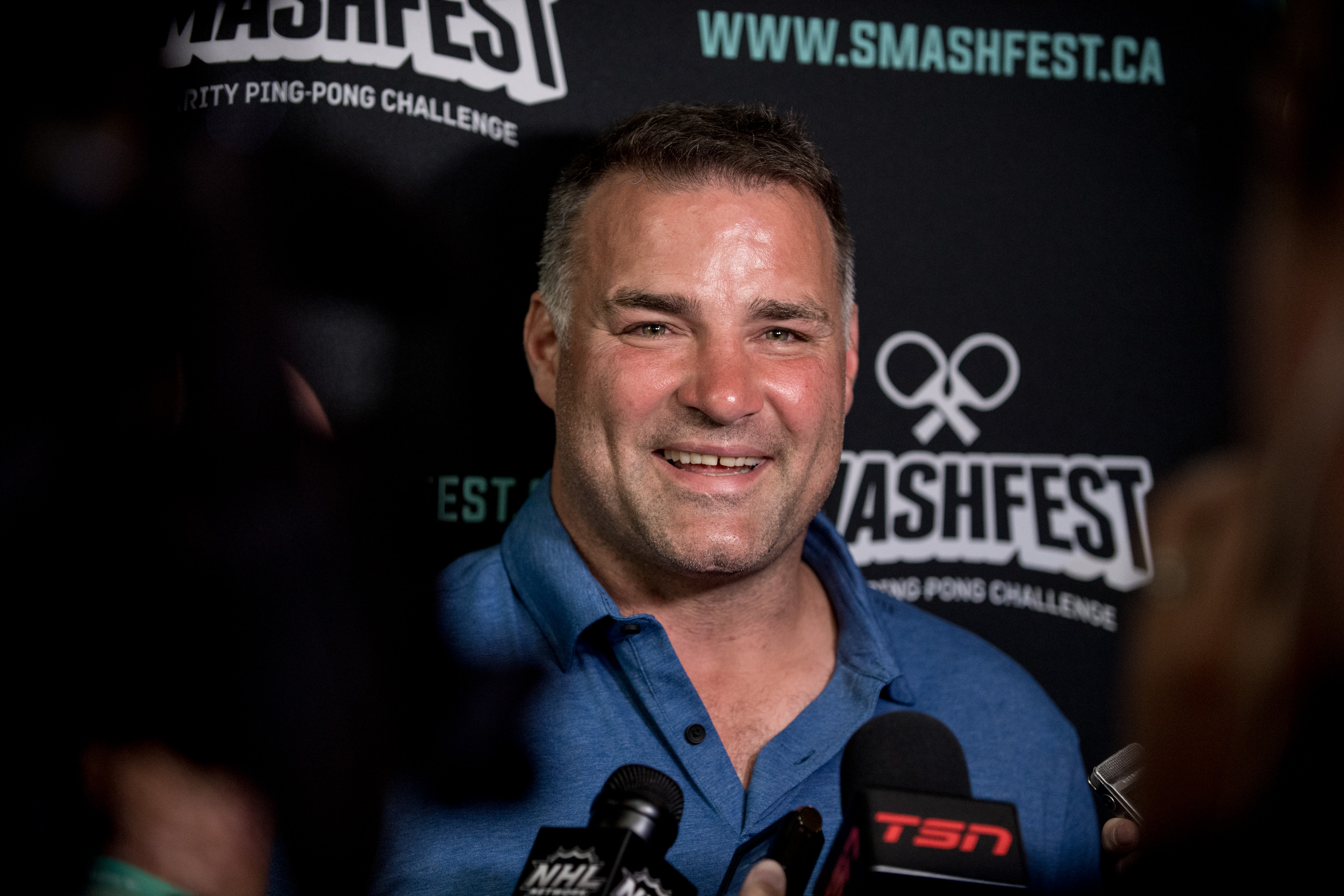
Eric Lindros’ 41 goals during the 1992–93 season is the most by a Flyers rookie. His 1.58 points per game average during the 1995–96 season is also a franchise record.

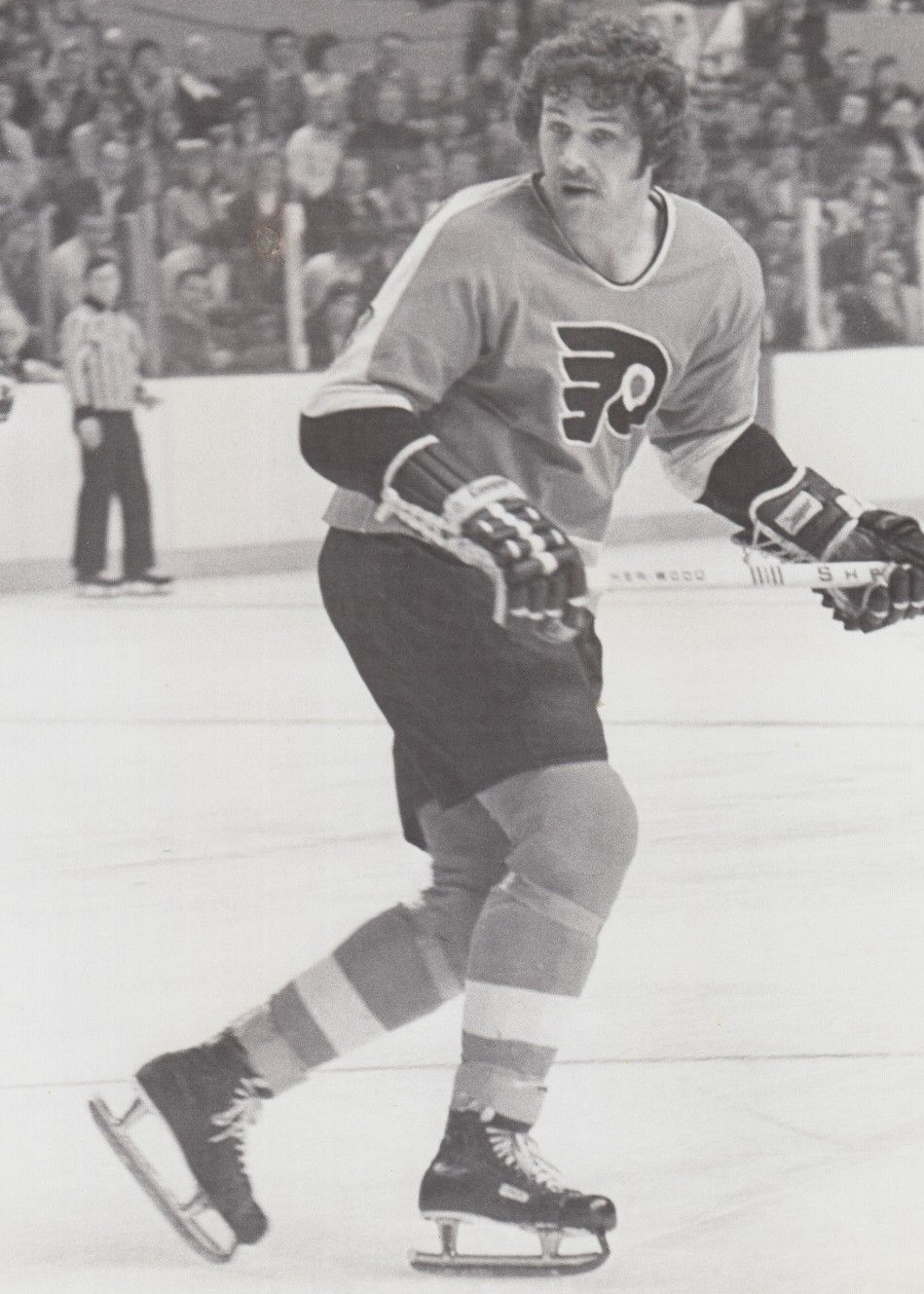
Dave Schultz holds the NHL single season record for most penalty minutes.

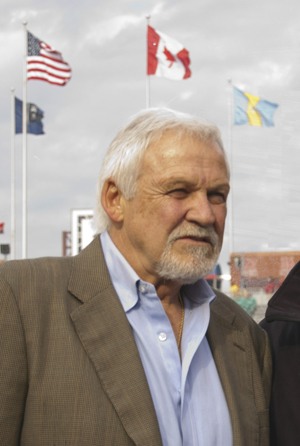
Bernie Parent held the NHL single season wins record until he was surpassed in 2007. When overtime and shootout wins are excluded (neither had been adopted by the NHL at the time the original record was set in 1974), Parent still holds the NHL single season record for most wins in regulation time.

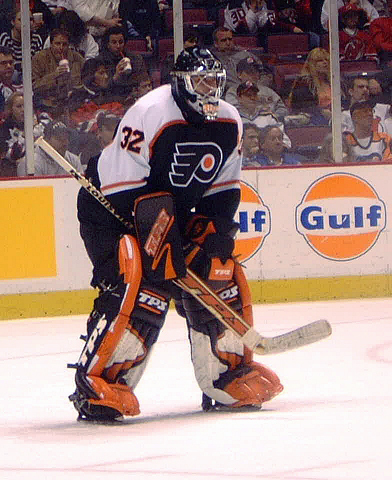
Roman Cechmanek’s 1.83 goals against average during the 2002–03 season is a franchise best.

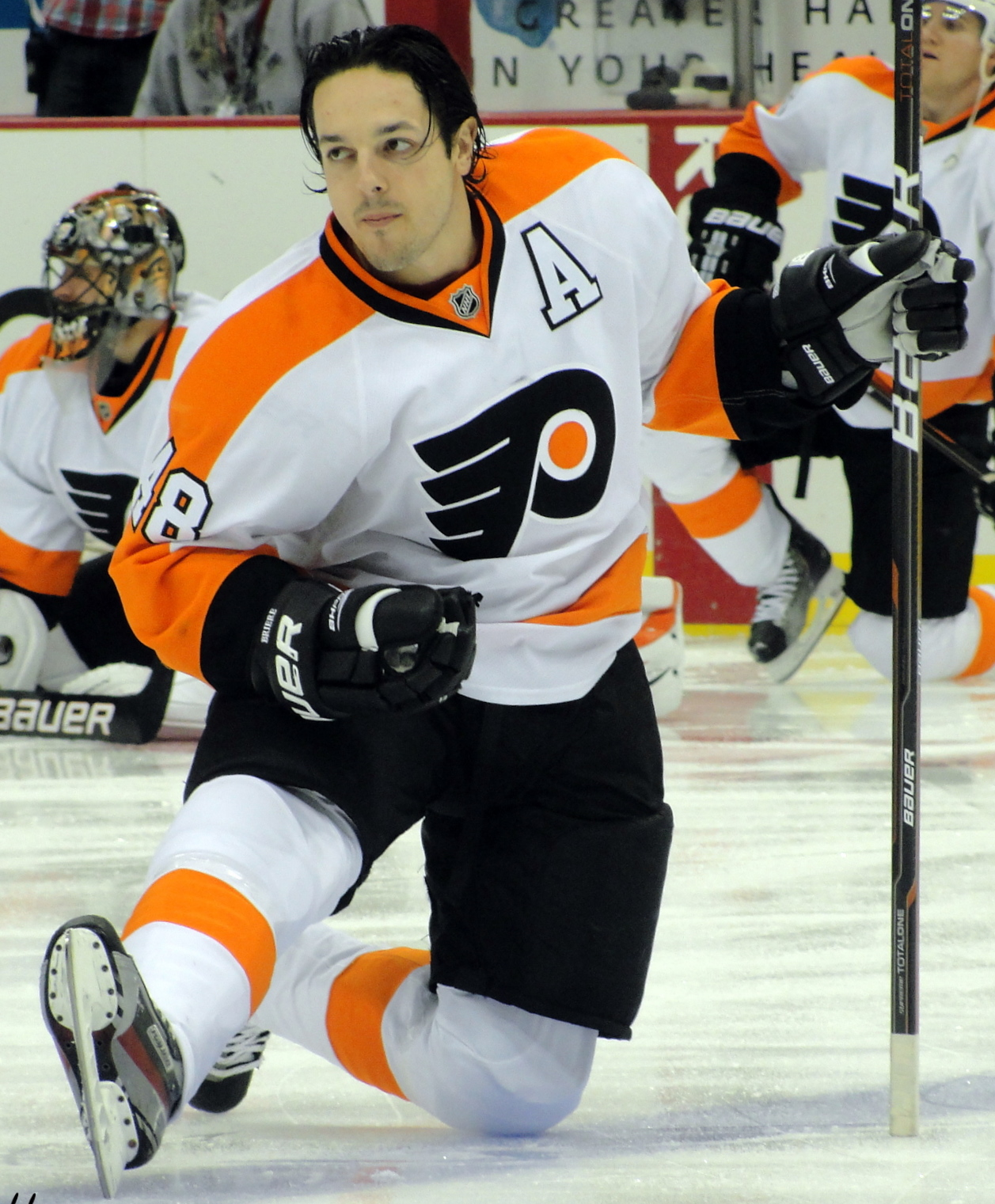
Danny Briere set the team single playoff season record for most points in 2010.

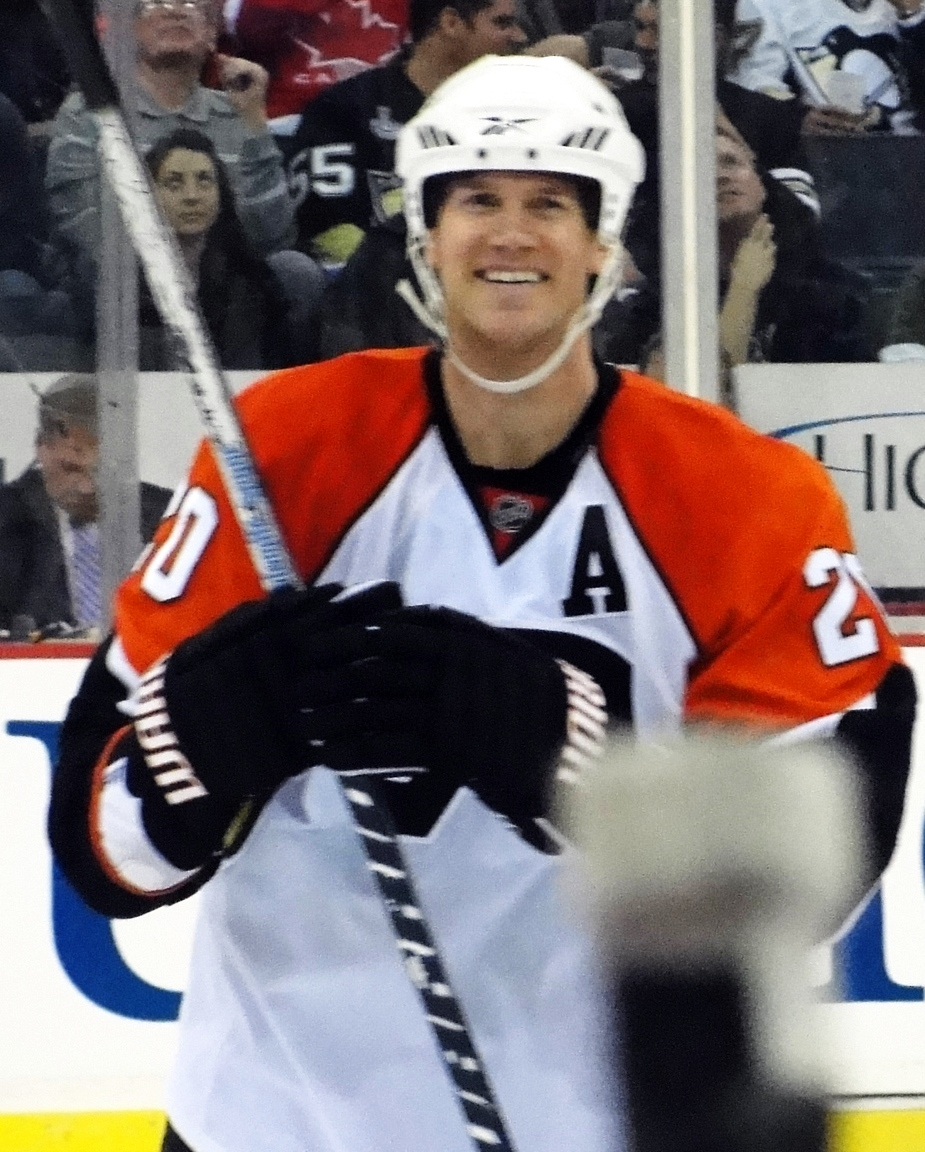
Chris Pronger tied the team playoff record for points by a defenseman during the 2010 Stanley Cup playoffs.

Regular season
Record	Total	Holder	Season	Ref
Goals	61	Reggie Leach	1975–76	
Goals (rookie)	41	Eric Lindros	1992–93	
Goals (defenseman)	24	Mark Howe	1985–86	
Goals (rookie defenseman)	17	Shayne Gostisbehere	2015–16	
Goals (one line)	141	Bill Barber (50)	1975–76	
Goals (one line)	141	Bobby Clarke (30)	1975–76	
Goals (one line)	141	Reggie Leach (61)	1975–76	
Goals per game	.77	Tim Kerr	1986–87	
Powerplay goals	34^{†}	Tim Kerr	1985–86	
Powerplay goals (defenseman)	8	Mark Howe	1987–88	
Powerplay goals (defenseman)	8	Eric Desjardins	1999–00	
Powerplay goals (defenseman)	8	Shayne Gostisbehere	2015–16	
Shorthanded goals	7	Brian Propp	1984–85	
Shorthanded goals	7	Mark Howe	1985–86	
Shorthanded goals	7	Mike Richards	2008–09	
Game-winning goals	12	Brian Propp	1982–83	
Game-winning goals	12	Jeff Carter	2008–09	
Overtime goals	4	Shayne Gostisbehere	2015–16	
Assists	89	Bobby Clarke	1974–75	
Assists	89	Bobby Clarke	1975–76	
Assists (rookie)	51	Pelle Eklund	1985–86	
Assists (defenseman)	60	Garry Galley	1993–94	
Assists (rookie defenseman)	40	Janne Niinimaa	1996–97	
Assists per game	1.17	Bobby Clarke	1975–76	
Points	123	Mark Recchi	1992–93	
Points (rookie)	82	Mikael Renberg	1993–94	
Points (defenseman)	82	Mark Howe	1985–86	
Points (rookie defenseman)	49	Behn Wilson	1978–79	
Points (one line)	322	Bill Barber (112)	1975–76	
Points (one line)	322	Bobby Clarke (119)	1975–76	
Points (one line)	322	Reggie Leach (91)	1975–76	
Points per game	1.58	Eric Lindros	1995–96	
Penalty minutes	472^{†}	Dave Schultz	1974–75	
Highest plus-minus	+87	Mark Howe	1985–86	
Lowest plus-minus	–47	Keith Yandle	2021–22	
Shots on goal	380	Bill Barber	1975–76	
Hat tricks	5	Tim Kerr	1984–85	
Games (goaltender)	73	Bernie Parent	1973–74	
Wins	47	Bernie Parent	1973–74	
Wins (regulation time)	47^{†}	Bernie Parent	1973–74	
Losses	29	Bernie Parent	1969–70	
Losses	29	Antero Niittymaki	2006–07	
Ties	20	Bernie Parent	1969–70	
Shutouts	12	Bernie Parent	1973–74	
Shutouts	12	Bernie Parent	1974–75	
Minutes played	4,307	Bernie Parent	1973–74	
Goals against average	1.83	Roman Cechmanek	2002–03	
Save percentage	.932	Bernie Parent	1973–74	
Goals against	208	Ron Hextall	1987–88	
Goals (goaltender)	1^{‡}	Ron Hextall	1987–88	
Points (goaltender)	8	Ron Hextall	1988–89	
Penalty minutes (goaltender)	113^{†}	Ron Hextall	1988–89	
Playoffs
Record	Total	Holder	Year	Ref
Goals	19^{‡}	Reggie Leach	1976	
Goals (defenseman)	5	Andy Delmore	2000	
Powerplay goals	8	Tim Kerr	1989	
Powerplay goals (defenseman)	3	Tom Bladon	1974	
Powerplay goals (defenseman)	3	Doug Crossman	1985	
Powerplay goals (defenseman)	3	Chris Pronger	2010	
Shorthanded goals	3^{‡}	Bill Barber	1980	
Game-winning goals	4	Rick MacLeish	1974	
Game-winning goals	4	Bill Barber	1980	
Game-winning goals	4	Danny Briere	2010	
Assists	20	Pelle Eklund	1987	
Assists (rookie)	14^{‡}	Ville Leino	2010	
Assists (defenseman)	15	Mark Howe	1989	
Points	30	Danny Briere	2010	
Points (rookie)	21^{‡}	Ville Leino	2010	
Points (defenseman)	18	Doug Crossman	1987	
Points (defenseman)	18	Chris Pronger	2010	
Penalty minutes	139	Dave Schultz	1974	
Highest plus-minus	+21	Andre Dupont	1980	
Lowest plus-minus	–10	Claude Giroux	2018	
Shots on goal	104	Brian Propp	1987	
Hat tricks	2	Rick MacLeish	1975	
Games (goaltender)	26^{‡}	Ron Hextall	1987	
Wins	15	Ron Hextall	1987	
Losses	11	Ron Hextall	1987	
Shutouts	4	Bernie Parent	1975	
Minutes played	1,542	Ron Hextall	1987	
Goals against average	1.36	Bernie Parent	1968	
Save percentage	.963^{†}	Bernie Parent	1968	
Goals against	71	Ron Hextall	1987	
Goals (goaltender)	1^{‡}	Ron Hextall	1989	
Penalty minutes (goaltender)	43^{†}	Ron Hextall	1987	

=== Team ===
Regular season (Note: Excluding the shortened 1994–95, 2012–13, 2019–20, and 2020–21 seasons.)
Record	Total	Season	Ref
Most wins	53	1984–85	
Most wins	53	1985–86	
Fewest wins	17	1969–70	
Most wins at home	36^{‡}	1975–76	
Fewest wins at home	10	2006–07	
Most wins on road	25	2010–11	
Most wins on road	25	2011–12	
Fewest wins on road	6	1968–69	
Fewest wins on road	6	1969–70	
Most losses	48	2006–07	
Most losses at home	24	2006–07	
Most losses on road	26	1991–92	
Most overtime losses	18	2014–15	
Fewest losses	12	1979–80	
Fewest losses at home	2	1975–76	
Fewest losses on road	7	1979–80	
Fewest overtime losses	3	1999–00	
Fewest overtime losses	3	2000–01	
Fewest overtime losses	3	2001–02	
Most ties	24^{†}	1969–70	
Most ties at home	13^{‡}	1969–70	
Most ties on road	15^{†}	1976–77	
Fewest ties	4	1985–86	
Fewest ties at home	1	1976–77	
Fewest ties at home	1	1985–86	
Fewest ties on road	3	1984–85	
Fewest ties on road	3	1985–86	
Fewest ties on road	3	1987–88	
Most points	118	1975–76	
Fewest points	56	2006–07	
Best points percentage	.738	1975–76	
Worst points percentage	.341	2006–07	
Most goals	350	1983–84	
Most goals against	319	1992–93	
Fewest goals	173	1967–68	
Fewest goals against	164	1973–74	
Most powerplay goals	98	1988–89	
Fewest powerplay goals	30	2021–22	
Most powerplay goals allowed	102	1981–82	
Fewest powerplay goals allowed	40	2001–02	
Most shorthanded goals	22	1986–87	
Fewest shorthanded goals	2	1990–91	
Most shorthanded goals allowed	16	1990–91	
Fewest shorthanded goals allowed	1	2008–09	
Most shutouts	13	1973–74	
Fewest shutouts	0	1981–82	
Fewest shutouts	0	1988–89	
Fewest shutouts	0	2010–11	
Most penalty minutes	2,621	1980–81	
Fewest penalty minutes	679	2017–18	
Most shootouts	14	2014–15	
Most shootouts	14	2025–26	
Fewest shootouts	3	2022–23	
Most shootout wins	10	2025–26	
Fewest shootout wins	1	2006–07	
Fewest shootout wins	1	2021–22	
Most shootout losses	11	2014–15	
Fewest shootout losses	1	2018–19	
Fewest shootout losses	1	2022–23	

Playoffs
Record	Total	Year	Ref
Most games played	26	1987	
Fewest games played	3	1983	
Fewest games played	3	1984	
Most wins	15	1987	
Fewest wins	0	1969	
Fewest wins	0	1971	
Fewest wins	0	1983	
Fewest wins	0	1984	
Most wins at home	9	1974	
Most wins at home	9	1980	
Most wins at home	9	2010	
Most wins on road	8	1987	
Most losses	11	1987	
Most losses at home	6	1987	
Most losses on road	7	2010	
Most overtime losses	4^{‡}	1996	
Most goals	85	1987	
Fewest goals	2	2002	
Most goals against	73	1987	
Fewest goals against	9	1999	
Most powerplay goals	23	2010	
Most shorthanded goals	7	1989	
Most shutouts	5	1975	
Most shutouts	5	2010	
Most penalty minutes	610	1989	

== Single game ==
=== Player ===
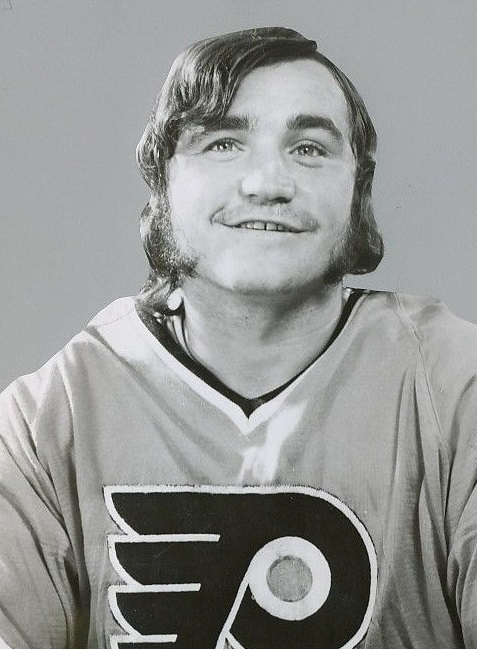
Rick MacLeish scored the first two 4-goal games in team history, a mark that has been matched but not exceeded in regular season competition 15 times since.

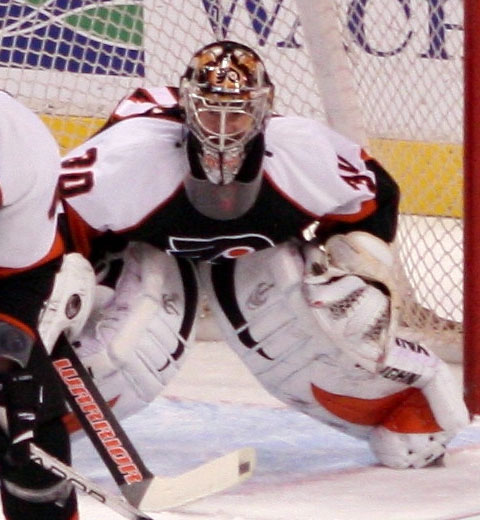
Antero Niittymaki holds the team regular season record for most saves in a game.

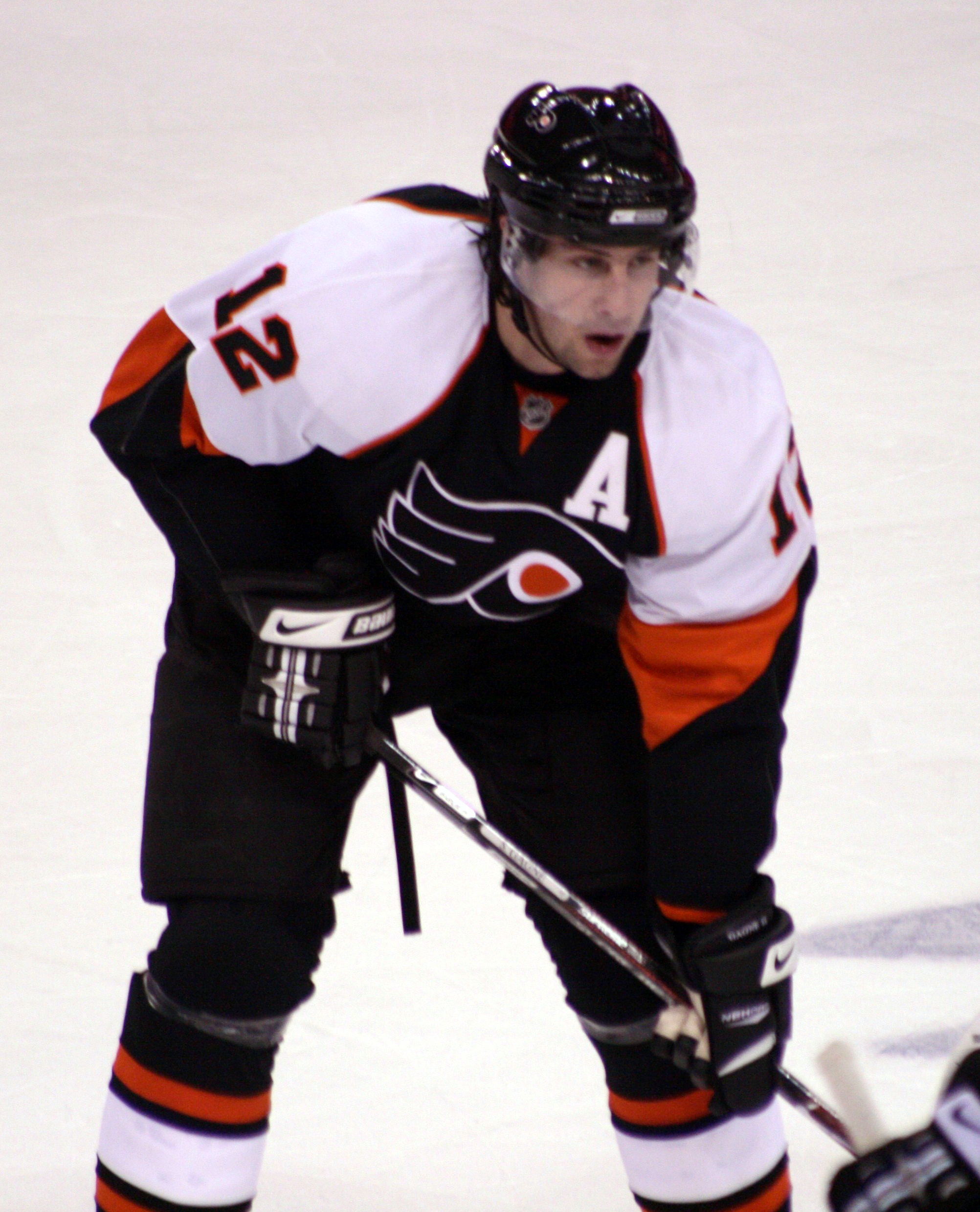
Simon Gagne scored the fastest overtime goal in franchise history on January 5, 2006.

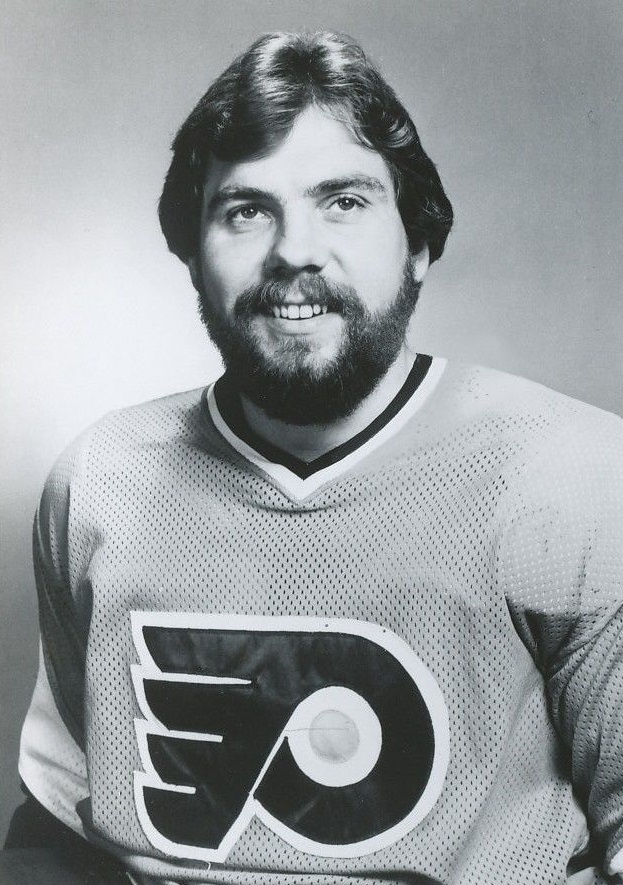
On May 1, 1980, Bob Dailey set a franchise playoff high for defensemen when he tallied five points. His four assists in that game is also tied for the team high among all skaters.

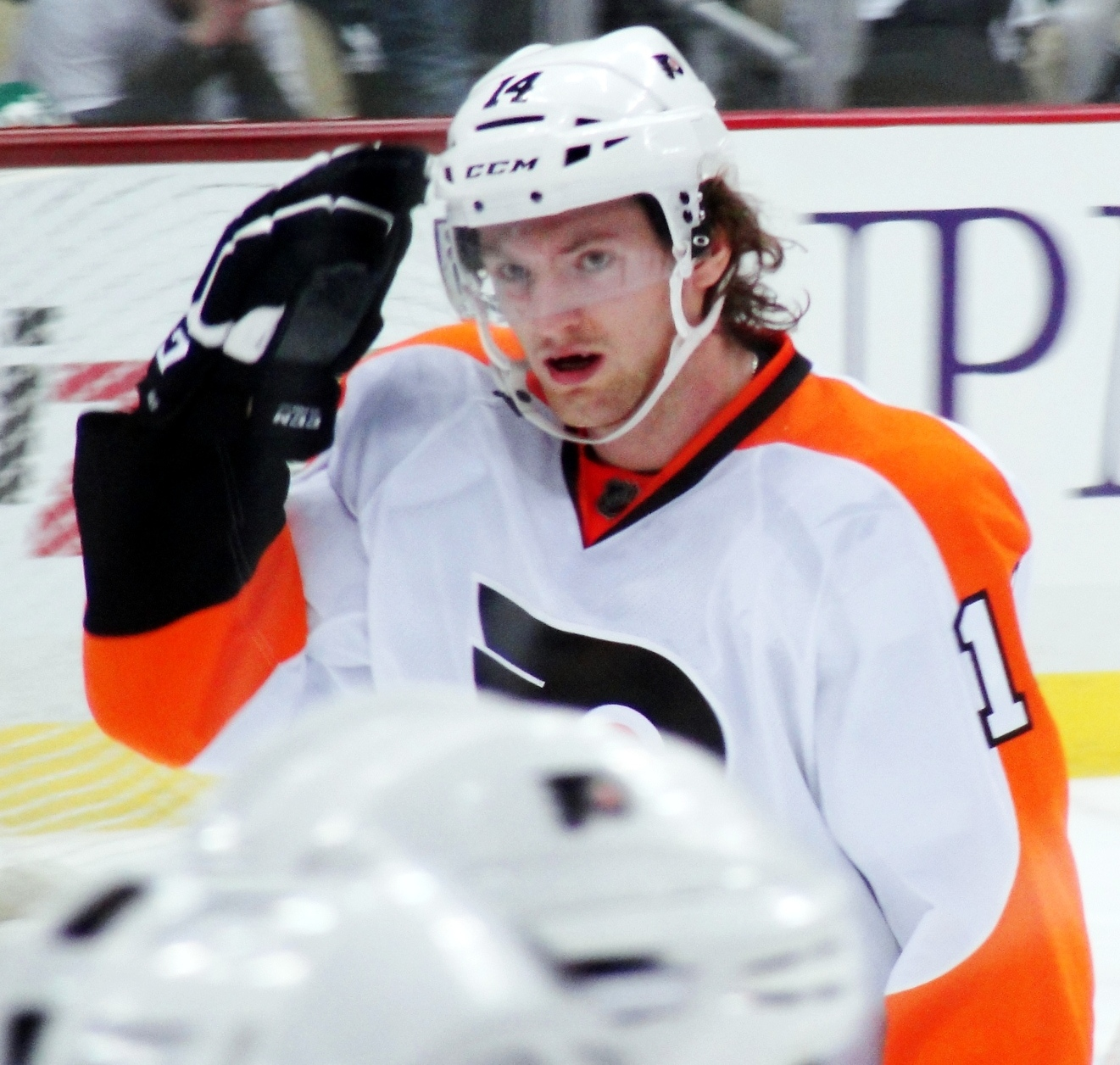
Sean Couturier, pictured here during an April 13, 2012 playoff game, tied a team record during the game for most points by a rookie in a single playoff game.

Regular season
Record	Total	Holder	Date	Ref
Goals	4	Rick MacLeish	2/13/1973	
Goals	4	Rick MacLeish	3/4/1973	
Goals	4	Tom Bladon	12/11/1977	
Goals	4	Tim Kerr	10/25/1984	
Goals	4	Tim Kerr	1/17/1985	
Goals	4	Tim Kerr	2/9/1985	
Goals	4	Tim Kerr	11/20/1986	
Goals	4	Brian Propp	12/2/1986	
Goals	4	Rick Tocchet	2/27/1988	
Goals	4	Rick Tocchet	1/25/1990	
Goals	4	Kevin Dineen	10/31/1993	
Goals	4	John LeClair	2/6/1997	
Goals	4	Eric Lindros	3/19/1997	
Goals	4	John LeClair	11/29/1998	
Goals	4	Jiri Dopita	1/8/2002	
Goals	4	John LeClair	10/15/2002	
Goals	4	Scott Laughton	12/12/2024	
Powerplay goals	3	Tim Kerr	11/3/1985	
Powerplay goals	3	Tim Kerr	11/20/1986	
Powerplay goals	3	Brian Propp	10/13/1988	
Powerplay goals	3	Scott Hartnell	1/19/2008	
Powerplay goals	3	Brayden Schenn	12/10/2016	
Shorthanded goals	2	Bobby Clarke	3/28/1974	
Shorthanded goals	2	Bill Barber	4/1/1978	
Shorthanded goals	2	Brian Propp	1/13/1985	
Shorthanded goals	2	Kevin Dineen	4/15/1993	
Shorthanded goals	2	Mike Richards	2/8/2006	
Shorthanded goals	2	Simon Gagne	11/13/2008	
Shorthanded goals	2	Travis Konecny	10/21/2023	
Assists	6	Eric Lindros	2/26/1997	
Assists (defenseman)	5	Alexandre Picard	2/1/2007	
Assists (rookie)	5	Alexandre Picard	2/1/2007	
Points	8	Tom Bladon	12/11/1977	
Points (defenseman)	8^{‡}	Tom Bladon	12/11/1977	
Points (NHL debut)	5^{†}	Al Hill	2/14/1977	
Points (one line)	16	John LeClair (6)	2/6/1997	
Points (one line)	16	Eric Lindros (5)	2/6/1997	
Points (one line)	16	Mikael Renberg (5)	2/6/1997	
Points (one line)	16	John LeClair (4)	2/26/1997	
Points (one line)	16	Eric Lindros (7)	2/26/1997	
Points (one line)	16	Mikael Renberg (5)	2/26/1997	
Highest plus/minus	+10^{†}	Tom Bladon	12/11/1977	
Shots on goal	14	Eric Lindros	3/19/1996	
Penalties	8	Don Nachbaur	3/19/1988	
Penalty minutes	55	Frank Bathe	3/11/1979	
Saves	54	Antero Niittymaki	1/5/2008	
Shots against	56	Antero Niittymaki	1/5/2008	
Fastest goal from start of game	0:08	Tim Kerr	3/7/1989	
Fastest two goals (one player)	0:08	Ron Flockhart	12/6/1981	
Fastest three goals (one player)	2:27	Tim Kerr	10/25/1984	
Fastest four goals (one player)	19:47	Rick MacLeish	2/13/1973	
Fastest overtime goal	0:07	Simon Gagne	1/5/2006	
Latest overtime goal	4:59	Scott Hartnell	3/18/2012	
Playoffs
Record	Total	Holder	Date	Ref
Goals	5^{‡}	Reggie Leach	5/6/1976	
Goals (defenseman)	3^{‡}	Andy Delmore	5/7/2000	
Powerplay goals	3^{‡}	Tim Kerr	4/13/1985	
Shorthanded goals	2^{‡}	Rod Brind'Amour	4/26/1997	
Assists	4	Bob Dailey	5/1/1980	
Assists	4	Ken Linseman	4/22/1981	
Assists	4	Brian Propp	5/26/1987	
Assists	4	Mark Recchi	5/7/2000	
Assists	4	Matt Carle	5/7/2010	
Points	6	Claude Giroux	4/13/2012	
Points (defenseman)	5	Bob Dailey	5/1/1980	
Points (rookie)	4	Peter Zezel	4/13/1985	
Points (rookie)	4	Sean Couturier	4/13/2012	
Penalty minutes	42^{‡}	Dave Schultz	4/22/1976	
Saves	63	Bernie Parent	4/16/1968	
Shots against	64	Bernie Parent	4/16/1968	
Fastest goal from start of game	0:07	Terry Murray	4/12/1981	
Fastest two goals (one player)	0:11	Orest Kindrachuk	5/11/1978	
Fastest three goals (one player)	3:24	Tim Kerr	4/13/1985	
Fastest four goals (one player)	8:16^{†}	Tim Kerr	4/13/1985	
Fastest overtime goal	0:23	Mel Bridgman	4/11/1978	

=== Team ===
Regular season
Record	Total	Date	Ref
Most goals	13	3/22/1984	
Most goals	13	10/18/1984	
Most goals against	12	1/30/1969	
Most powerplay goals	6	1/9/1972	
Most powerplay goals	6	10/13/1988	
Most powerplay goals allowed	6	2/19/1980	
Most shorthanded goals	3	12/15/1983	
Most shorthanded goals	3	1/13/1985	
Most shorthanded goals	3	4/2/1996	
Most shorthanded goals	3	10/21/2023	
Most penalties	38	2/22/1980	
Most penalty minutes	213^{†}	3/5/2004	
Most shots on goal	62	4/1/1976	
Fastest two goals from start of game	0:31	10/26/2002	
Fastest two goals	0:06	4/7/2018	
Fastest three goals	0:26	11/22/2025	
Fastest four goals	1:22	10/11/1981	
Fastest five goals	5:29	2/23/1988	
Fastest two shorthanded goals	0:26	11/6/1986	

Playoffs
Record	Total	Date	Ref
Longest game	152:01	5/4/2000	
Longest home game	90:07	4/26/1977	
Most goals	9	4/22/1981	
Most goals against	10	4/25/1989	
Most goals against	10	4/18/2012	
Most powerplay goals	4	5/1/1980	
Most powerplay goals	4	4/13/1985	
Most powerplay goals	4	4/15/2012	
Most shorthanded goals	2	4/9/1981	
Most shorthanded goals	2	5/2/1987	
Most shorthanded goals	2	5/1/1989	
Most shorthanded goals	2	4/26/1997	
Most shorthanded goals	2	4/13/2012	
Penalties	30	4/15/1976	
Penalty minutes	107	4/15/1976	
Most shots on goal	75	4/16/2003	
Most shots on goal (overtime)	43	5/4/2000	
Fastest two goals	0:08	4/22/1976	
Fastest three goals	1:21	4/25/1976	
Fastest four goals	3:16	4/25/1976	
Fastest five goals	7:48	4/13/1986	

== Single period ==
=== Player ===
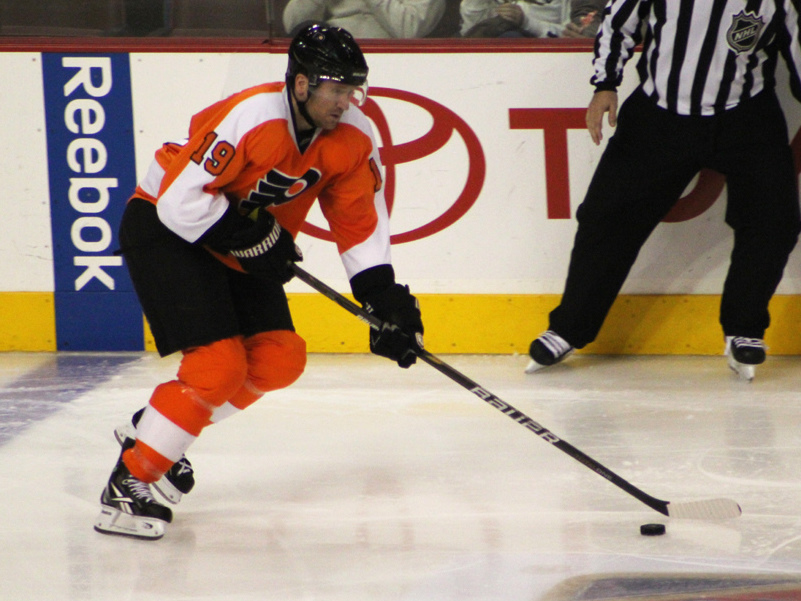
Of the 13 Flyers to score three goals in a single period during the regular season, Scott Hartnell is one of only two to do so twice.

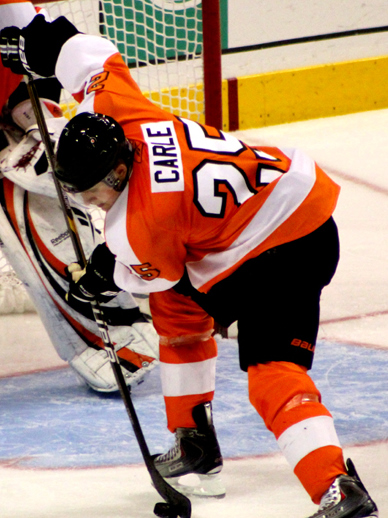
On October 6, 2009, defenseman Matt Carle tallied four assists in the second period, tying the team records for most assists and points in a single period.

Regular season
Record	Total	Holder	Date	Ref
Goals	3	Simon Nolet	10/31/1971	
Goals	3	Bill Flett	3/9/1972	
Goals	3	Rick MacLeish	2/13/1973	
Goals	3	Bobby Clarke	12/13/1980	
Goals	3	Tim Kerr	10/25/1984	
Goals	3	Murray Craven	11/13/1986	
Goals	3	Eric Lindros	1/19/1994	
Goals	3	Mikael Renberg	2/15/1994	
Goals	3	Eric Lindros	3/19/1997	
Goals	3	John LeClair	11/29/1998	
Goals	3	Danny Briere	11/21/2007	
Goals	3	Scott Hartnell	12/20/2008	
Goals	3	Mike Richards	10/6/2009	
Goals	3	Scott Hartnell	1/22/2012	
Goals	3	Scott Laughton	12/12/2024	
Assists	4	Eric Lindros	2/26/1997	
Assists	4	Eric Lindros	11/29/1998	
Assists	4	Matt Carle	10/6/2009	
Points	4	Simon Nolet	10/31/1971	
Points	4	Bobby Clarke	3/9/1972	
Points	4	Bill Flett	3/9/1972	
Points	4	Rick MacLeish	3/4/1973	
Points	4	Kevin Dineen	4/15/1993	
Points	4	Eric Lindros	1/19/1994	
Points	4	Eric Lindros	4/2/1994	
Points	4	Eric Lindros	2/26/1997	
Points	4	Eric Lindros	3/19/1997	
Points	4	John LeClair	10/11/1997	
Points	4	Eric Lindros	11/14/1998	
Points	4	Eric Lindros	11/29/1998	
Points	4	Matt Carle	10/6/2009	
Points	4	Claude Giroux	12/19/2013	
Fastest goal (start of period)	0:05	Eric Lindros	11/12/1992	
Playoffs
Record	Total	Holder	Date	Ref
Goals	4^{‡}	Tim Kerr	4/13/1985	
Powerplay goals	3^{†}	Tim Kerr	4/13/1985	
Shorthanded goals	2^{‡}	Rod Brind'Amour	4/26/1997	
Assists	3	Barry Ashbee	4/5/1973	
Assists	3	Rick MacLeish	4/24/1977	
Assists	3	Ken Linseman	4/22/1981	
Assists	3	Peter Zezel	4/13/1985	
Assists	3	Tim Kerr	4/21/1985	
Assists	3	Paul Coffey	5/7/1997	
Assists	3	Rod Brind'Amour	5/11/1997	
Points	4^{‡}	Tim Kerr	4/13/1985	
Penalties	5	Rick Tocchet	4/29/2000	
Penalty minutes	29	Rick Tocchet	4/29/2000	
Fastest goal (start of period)	0:06^{‡}	Pelle Eklund	4/25/1989	
Fastest two goals (start of period)	6:04	Mel Bridgman	4/25/1976	

=== Team ===
Regular season
Record	Total	Date	Ref
Most goals	8	3/31/1973	
Most goals against	7	3/17/2021	
Most powerplay goals	4	10/13/1988	
Most shorthanded goals	3	12/15/1983	
Most penalties	32	3/5/2004	
Most penalty minutes	209^{†}	3/5/2004	
Most shots on goal	28	2/11/2019	
Fastest two goals (start of period)	0:31	10/28/1982	
Fastest two goals (start of period)	0:31	10/26/2002	
Fastest three goals (start of period)	2:19	1/5/2001	

Playoffs
Record	Total	Date	Ref
Most goals	5	4/25/1976	
Most goals	5	4/22/1981	
Most goals	5	4/13/1985	
Most goals	5	4/13/1986	
Most goals	5	4/9/1987	
Most goals against	6	4/24/1979	
Most goals against	6	4/25/1989	
Most powerplay goals	3	5/1/1980	
Most powerplay goals	3	4/13/1985	
Most powerplay goals	3	4/18/2012	
Most shorthanded goals	2	5/2/1987	
Most shorthanded goals	2	4/26/1997	
Most penalties	17	4/15/1976	
Most penalty minutes	92	4/29/2000	
Most shots on goal	28	4/21/1997	
Most shots on goal (overtime)	15	4/16/2003	

== Streaks ==
=== Player ===
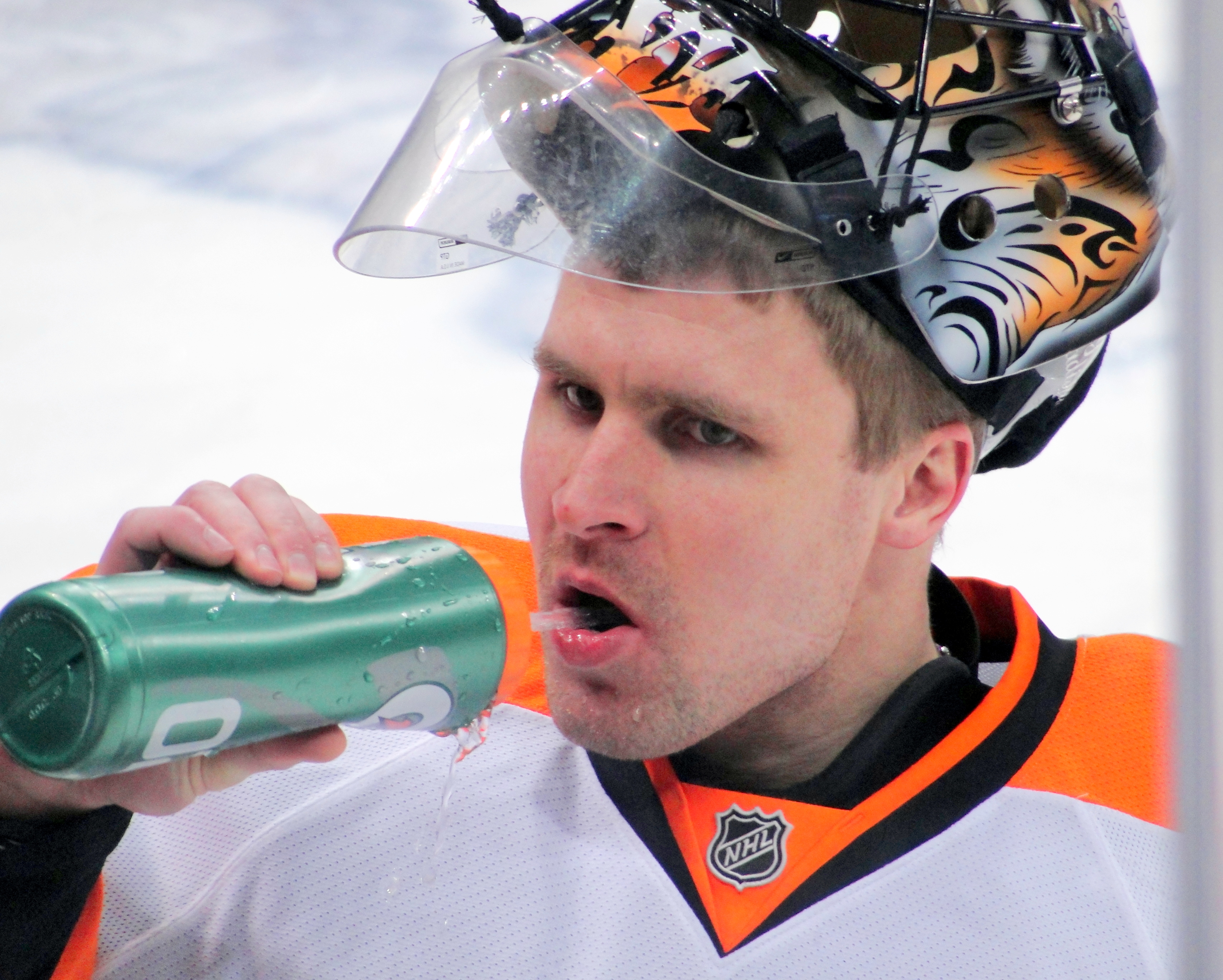
Ilya Bryzgalov set the team record in 2012 by going 249 minutes and 43 seconds without allowing a goal.

Regular season
Record	Total	Holder	Start	End	Ref
Games	484	Rod Brind'Amour	2/24/1993	4/18/1999	
Games with a goal	9	Rick Tocchet	3/1/1989	3/19/1989	
Games with a goal (rookie)	8	Ron Flockhart	2/4/1982	2/20/1982	
Games with an assist	12	Bobby Clarke	3/11/1976	4/3/1976	
Games with an assist (rookie)	9	Pelle Eklund	3/2/1986	3/20/1986	
Games with an assist (rookie)	9	Shayne Gostisbehere	1/21/2016	2/11/2016	
Games with a point	18	Bobby Clarke	2/26/1975	4/3/1975	
Games with a point	18	Eric Lindros	1/7/1999	2/18/1999	
Games with a point (rookie)	15	Shayne Gostisbehere	1/19/2016	2/20/2016	
Games with a point (rookie defenseman)	15^{†}	Shayne Gostisbehere	1/19/2016	2/20/2016	
Starts (goaltender)	37	Bernie Parent	10/11/1973	1/10/1974	
Wins	9	Bernie Parent	11/20/1977	12/28/1977	
Wins	9	Pelle Lindbergh	12/22/1982	2/10/1983	
Wins	9	Pelle Lindbergh	3/8/1985	3/24/1985	
Wins	9	Ron Hextall	12/8/1987	12/26/1987	
Wins	9	Ron Hextall	12/6/1996	1/7/1997	
Home wins	14	Wayne Stephenson	1/4/1976	3/18/1976	
Road wins	8	Pelle Lindbergh	12/22/1982	3/3/1983	
Wins (rookie)	9	Pelle Lindbergh	12/22/1982	2/10/1983	
Games without a win (goaltender)	15	Antero Niittymaki	12/2/2006	1/20/2007	
Shutouts	3	John Vanbiesbrouck	10/20/1999	10/24/1999	
Shutouts	3	Ilya Bryzgalov	3/8/2012	3/13/2012	
Shutout sequence	249:43	Ilya Bryzgalov	3/6/2012	3/15/2012	
Playoffs
Record	Total	Holder	Start	End	Ref
Playoff appearances	12	Bobby Clarke	1972–73	1983–84	
Games with a goal	10^{†}	Reggie Leach	4/17/1976	5/9/1976	
Games with a point	11	Reggie Leach	4/15/1976	5/9/1976	
Wins	6	Bernie Parent	4/9/1974	4/23/1974	
Wins	6	Pelle Lindbergh	4/10/1985	4/23/1985	
Wins	6	Ron Hextall	5/12/1995	5/26/1995	

=== Team ===
Regular season
Record	Total	Start	End	Ref
Winning streak	13	10/19/1985	11/17/1985	
Home winning streak	20	1/4/1976	4/3/1976	
Road winning streak	8	12/22/1982	1/16/1983	
Losing streak	9	12/8/2006	12/27/2006	
Home losing streak	8	12/9/2006	1/27/2007	
Road losing streak	8	10/25/1972	11/26/1972	
Road losing streak	8	3/3/1988	3/29/1988	
Tie streak	4	1/2/1969	1/8/1969	
Tie streak	4	12/8/1991	12/15/1991	
Home tie streak	4	10/19/1969	10/30/1969	
Road tie streak	4	3/1/1969	3/15/1969	
Undefeated streak	35^{†} (Note: 25 wins and 10 ties)	10/14/1979	1/6/1980	
Home undefeated streak	26 (Note: 19 wins and 7 ties)	10/11/1979	2/3/1980	
Road undefeated streak	16 (Note: 11 wins and 5 ties)	10/20/1979	1/6/1980	
Winless streak	13 (Note: 10 losses, 2 overtime losses, and 1 shootout loss)	12/30/2021	1/25/2022	
Home winless streak	13 (Note: 10 losses and 3 shootout losses)	11/29/2006	2/8/2007	
Road winless streak	19 (Note: 15 losses and 4 ties)	10/23/1971	1/27/1972	
Shutout streak	4	12/14/1996	12/21/1996	
Shutout streak	4	1/7/1999	1/13/1999	
Shutout sequence	265:08	12/12/1996	12/22/1996	

Playoffs
Record	Total	Start	End	Ref
Playoff appearances	17	1972–73	1988–89	
Playoff misses	5	1989–90	1993–94	
Playoff misses	5	2020–21	2024–25	
Winning streak	8	5/19/1974	5/4/1975	
Home winning streak	13	4/9/1974	5/1/1975	
Road winning streak	5	5/12/1995	6/10/1995	
Road winning streak	5	5/3/1997	5/23/1997	
Road winning streak	5	5/2/2000	5/20/2000	
Losing streak	10	4/18/1968	4/4/1973	
Home losing streak	6	4/26/1981	4/7/1984	
Road losing streak	7	5/17/1980	4/20/1981	

== Single playoff series ==
=== Player ===
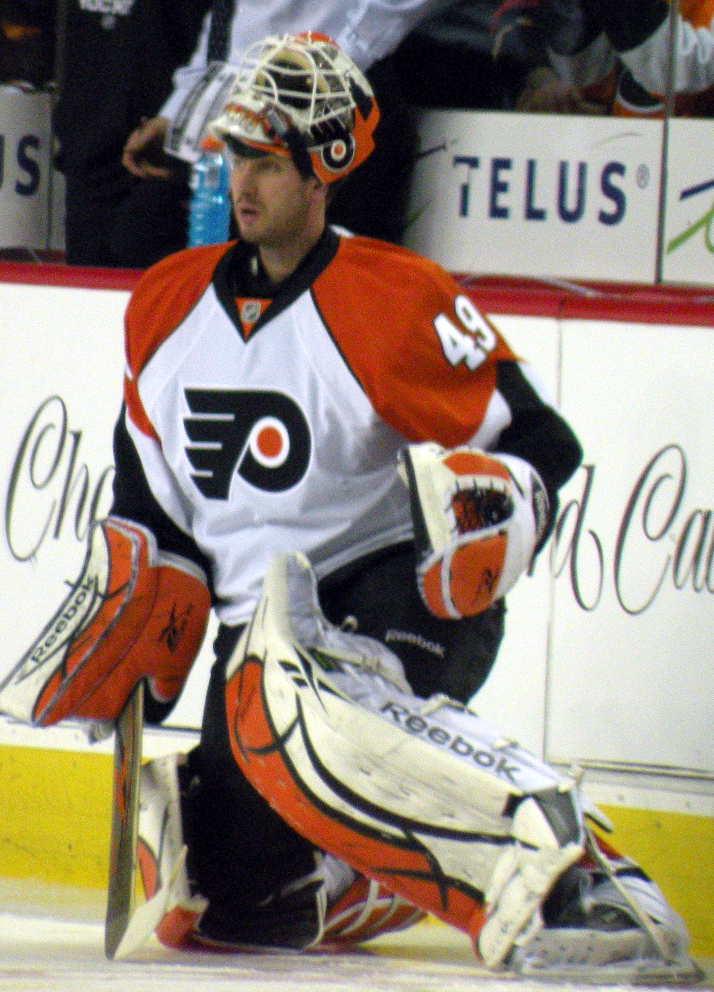
Michael Leighton tied an NHL record in the 2010 Eastern Conference Finals for most shutouts in a playoff series.

Record	Total	Holder	Year	Round (opponent)	Ref
Goals	10	Tim Kerr	1989	Division Finals (PIT)	
Assists	9	Danny Briere	2010	Stanley Cup Finals (CHI)	
Points	15	Tim Kerr	1989	Division Finals (PIT)	
Powerplay goals	5	Tim Kerr	1989	Division Finals (PIT)	
Shorthanded goals	3^{‡}	Bill Barber	1980	Semifinals (MNS)	
Game winning goals	3	John LeClair	1997	Conference Quarterfinals (PIT)	
Penalty minutes	116^{†}	Dave Schultz	1976	Quarterfinals (TOR)	
Shutouts	3^{‡}	Michael Leighton	2010	Conference Finals (MTL)	

=== Team ===
Record	Total	Year	Round (opponent)	Ref
Overtime games	3	2003	Conference Quarterfinals (TOR)	
Overtime games	3	2020	Second Round (NYI)	
Most goals	33	1976	Quarterfinals (TOR)	
Most goals allowed	31	1988	Division Semifinals (WSH)	
Fewest goals	2	2002	Conference Quarterfinals (OTT)	
Fewest goals (5-games)	2^{†}	2002	Conference Quarterfinals (OTT)	
Fewest goals allowed	3	1978	Preliminary Round (CLR)	
Powerplay goals	12	2012	Conference Quarterfinals (PIT)	
Powerplay goals allowed	15^{‡}	1980	Stanley Cup Finals (NYI)	
Shorthanded goals	4	1989	Division Finals (PIT)	
Shorthanded goals allowed	5	1979	Quarterfinals (NYR)	
Penalties	94	1989	Division Finals (PIT)	
Penalty minutes	295	1976	Quarterfinals (TOR)	
