= History of the Los Angeles Kings =

NHL team history

The history of the Los Angeles Kings of the National Hockey League begins in 1966, as the league prepared a major expansion for the upcoming season, and awarded a new team to Los Angeles-based entrepreneur Jack Kent Cooke, who also owned the Los Angeles Lakers. While the Los Angeles Kings awaited construction to be completed on their future home, The Forum in Inglewood, California, they played their first two games during their inaugural 1967–68 season at the Long Beach Arena. The first game in Kings history was played on Oct. 14, 1967 and the Kings defeated the fellow expansion Philadelphia Flyers 4–2 in front of 7,023. They also played 14 games at the Los Angeles Memorial Sports Arena while awaiting the completion of the construction of the Forum. The Kings hosted their first game at the Forum on Dec. 30, 1967, a 2–0 loss to the Philadelphia Flyers. They went on to play their first 32 seasons at Forum before moving to the Crypto.com Arena in Downtown Los Angeles in 1999.

During the 1970s and early 1980s, the Kings had many years marked by impressive play in the regular season only to be washed out by early playoff exits. In 1988, the Kings traded with the Edmonton Oilers to get their captain Wayne Gretzky, leading to a successful phase of the franchise that raised hockey's popularity in Los Angeles. Gretzky, fellow Hall of Famer Luc Robitaille and defenseman Rob Blake led the Kings to the franchise's sole division title in 1990–91, and the Kings' first Stanley Cup Final in 1993, lost to the Montreal Canadiens.

After the 1993 Finals, the Kings entered financial problems, with a bankruptcy in 1995 that was only solved with the acquisition by Philip Anschutz (owner of Anschutz Entertainment Group, operators of Staples Center) and Edward P. Roski. A period of mediocrity ensued, with the Kings only resurging as they broke a six-year playoff drought in the 2009–10 season, with a team that included goaltender Jonathan Quick, defenseman Drew Doughty, and forwards Dustin Brown, Anze Kopitar and Justin Williams. Under coach Darryl Sutter, who was hired early in the 2011–12 season, the Kings won two Stanley Cups in three years: 2012, over the New Jersey Devils, and 2014, against the New York Rangers.

== Background and NHL expansion ==
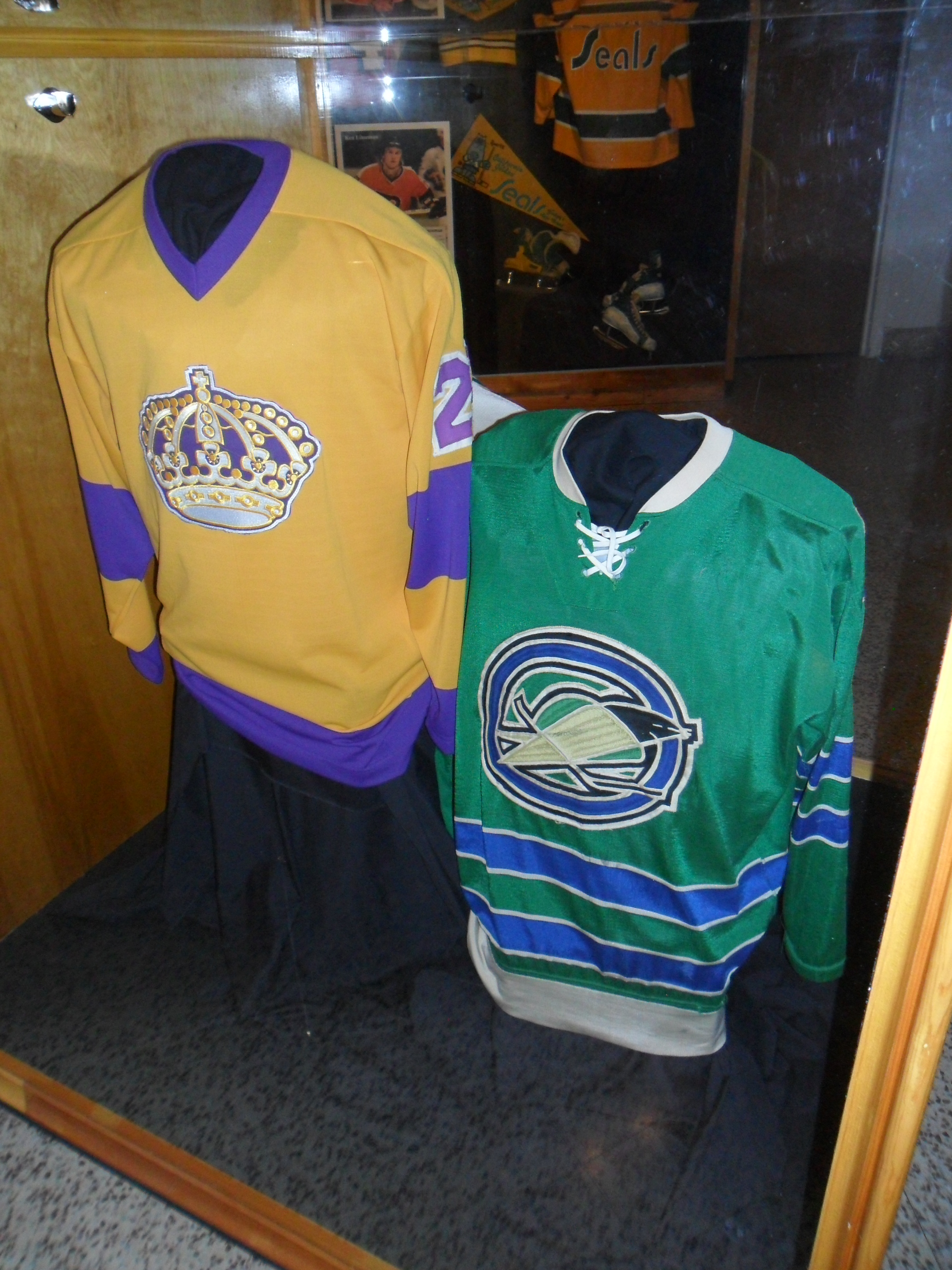
An exhibit at the Hockey Hall of Fame, showcasing the inaugural jerseys for the 1967 NHL expansion teams. The Kings used gold and purple colours on their jerseys until 1988.

Prior to the Kings arrival in the Los Angeles area, both the Pacific Coast Hockey League (PCHL) and the Western Hockey League (WHL) had several teams in California, including the PCHL's Los Angeles Monarchs of the 1930s and the WHL's Los Angeles Blades of the 1960s. When the NHL decided to expand for the 1967–68 season amid rumblings that the WHL was proposing to turn itself into a major league and compete for the Stanley Cup, five separate Los Angeles groups bid for a hockey franchise, including ones led by Buffalo Bills owner Ralph Wilson and Donna Reed's producer husband Tony Owen. Blades owner Dan Reeves, who was also proprietor of the National Football League's Los Angeles Rams, seemed the favorite for already having a team and a lease with the Los Angeles Memorial Sports Arena. However, he would end up surpassed by Canadian entrepreneur Jack Kent Cooke, who owned the National Basketball Association's Los Angeles Lakers.

As the Lakers played at the Memorial Sports Arena, Cooke applied for both a long-term NBA lease and the right to sign a lease for hockey in case he won the NHL franchise. But the Los Angeles Coliseum Commission, which managed the Sports Arena and the Los Angeles Memorial Coliseum, had already entered into an agreement with the Blades, and only offered a two-year deal for the Lakers. Frustrated by his dealings with the Coliseum Commission, Cooke said, "I am going to build my own arena...I've had enough of this balderdash." Thus he was the only Los Angeles applicant with plans for his own stadium, something that made the NHL favor his bid.

In February 1966, Cooke was awarded one of the six new NHL expansion franchises, which also included the California Seals, Minnesota North Stars, Philadelphia Flyers, Pittsburgh Penguins and St. Louis Blues. Los Angeles has a large number of expatriates from both the Northeastern United States and Canada, which Cooke saw as a natural fan base. On July, Cooke purchased 29.4 acres of land in the Los Angeles suburb of Inglewood to build his arena, The Forum. Combining the $2 million NHL expansion fee, a $1 million indemnity to the Blades for territorial rights, $4.02 million for the Forum terrain and $12.2 million for the building itself, Cooke spent $19 million to create the Kings, one of the most expensive expansion teams of the period.

Following a contest to name the team, Cooke picked the name Kings, and chose the original team colors of purple (or "Forum Blue", as it was later officially called) and gold – the same worn by the Lakers – because they were colors traditionally associated with royalty. Prior to the 1967 NHL expansion draft, Cooke named Larry Regan the first general manager in franchise history, and struck a deal with Toronto Maple Leafs left winger Red Kelly, who was set for his retirement, to become the Kings' first head coach. Kelly's rights would be acquired during the expansion draft, but eventually Maple Leafs' general manager Punch Imlach decided to put him on the protected list and force Cooke to send one of his picks, Ken Block, in exchange for Kelly. Cooke also decided to improve the Kings' roster by purchasing the American Hockey League's Springfield Indians and promoting their best players.

== The "Forum Blue and Gold" years (1967–1975) ==
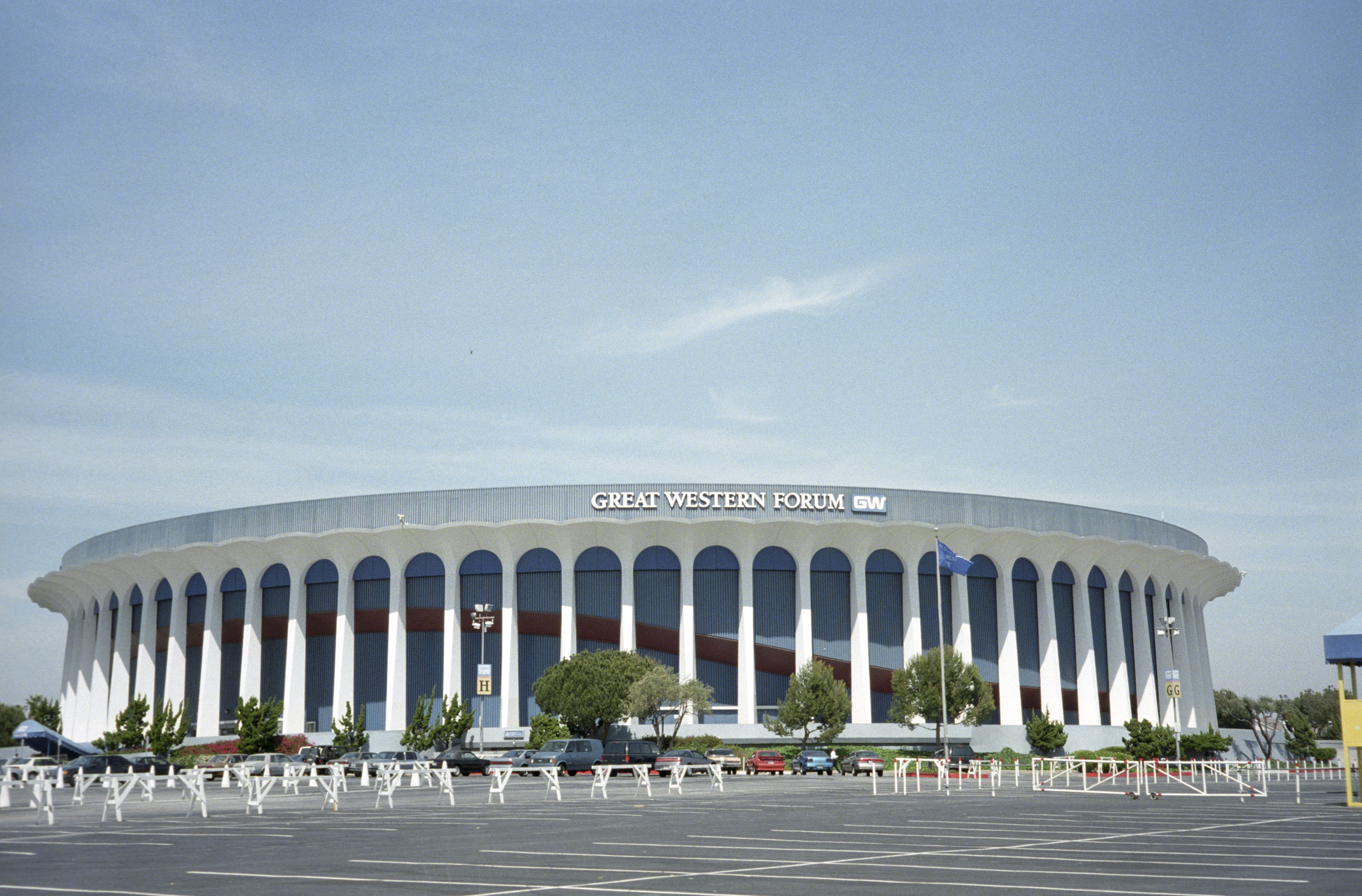
The Forum in 1997. The venue served as the home arena for the Kings from 1967 to 1999.

The Forum was not yet complete when the 1967–68 season began, so the Kings opened their first season at the Long Beach Arena in the neighboring city of Long Beach on October 14, 1967, defeating the Philadelphia Flyers 4–2. For the next two months, the Kings played their home games both at Long Beach and at the Sports Arena. The "Fabulous Forum" finally opened its doors on December 30, 1967, with the Kings being shut out by the Flyers, 2–0.

The Kings made the Forum their home for the next 32 seasons. Players like Bill "Cowboy" Flett, Eddie "The Jet" Joyal, Eddie "The Entertainer" Shack and Real "Frenchy" Lemieux helped introduce the Los Angeles area to the NHL in the team's first few seasons. Such player nicknames were the brainchild of none other than Cooke himself.

In their first season, the Kings finished in second place in the Western Division, just one point behind the Flyers. The Kings were the only expansion team that had a winning record at home, but were eliminated in the first round of the playoffs by the Minnesota North Stars, losing the seventh game at The Forum on April 18, 1968, 9–4. In their second season behind Red Kelly, the Kings finished fourth in the West Division—the final playoff berth. But after eliminating the Oakland Seals in the first round of the playoffs in seven games, the Kings were swept out of post-season play in the second round by the St. Louis Blues.

After two fairly successful seasons, the Kings hit upon hard times, mostly due to poor management. Kings general managers established a history of trading away first-round draft picks, usually for veteran players (many of them NHL stars on the downside of their careers), a problem that would hinder the development of the franchise for years to come. The Kings' attendance also suffered during this time, leading Cooke to muse that the reason so many Northeasterners and Canadians moved to Southern California was that "they hated hockey."

In 1972, the Kings made two key acquisitions. First, the rise of rookie goaltender Ken Dryden in Montreal made goaltender Rogie Vachon expendable, and the Kings obtained him in a trade with the Canadiens on November 4, 1971. After years of a "revolving door" in goal, Vachon solidified the position, often in spectacular fashion. For the next five years, the Forum was often filled with chants of "Rogie!, Rogie!" as Vachon made many a great save. In addition, the Kings obtained former Toronto Maple Leafs winger Bob Pulford, first as a player and then as their head coach. Under Pulford's disciplined direction, the Kings went from being one of the worst defensive teams in the league to one of the best. It took him just two seasons to lead the Kings back to the playoffs and in 1974, they faced the Chicago Blackhawks, only to be eliminated in five games. Pulford eventually led the team to three of the most successful seasons in franchise history, including a 105-point season in 1974–75 that is still a franchise record. They finished second behind Montreal in the Norris Division, which was relatively strong compared to the other divisions. Also in 1975 that season, due to the growing number of teams, the NHL introduced a new playoff structure, including a best of three preliminary round to the playoffs for the bottom eight of the qualifying twelve teams (the winners of each division automatically receiving a berth into the next round). With the fourth-best record in the league, the Kings were heavy favorites against the Maple Leafs, who finished with 78 points. Despite winning game one at home in the Forum, the Kings lost game two in Toronto on April 10. Due to scheduling conflicts, and owner Jack Kent Cooke's refusal to play an afternoon game on April 12, game three was played at the Forum the next day, April 11, instead, giving each team less rest between the games. The Kings, having an older core of players that were jet-lagged from the cross country flight right before the game, simply did not have the energy due to lack of rest and recovery, and were upset in the deciding game at home 2–1 by the lowly but younger Maple Leafs. As Bob Miller said in his book, Tales from the Los Angeles Kings, "I'll never forget, with 10 seconds left, looking down from our broadcast location, seeing Toronto owner Harold Ballard and his sidekick King Clancy hugging and jumping up and down in the aisle as they eliminated the heavily favored Kings. It was such a disappointment after a tremendous season that Bob Pulford left the building in tears... because of Cooke's stubbornness the Kings' best season ever was wasted."

== Marcel Dionne and the "Triple Crown Line" (1975–1988) ==
After being eliminated in the first round of the playoffs in both 1973–74 and 1974–75, the Kings moved to significantly upgrade their offensive firepower when they acquired center Marcel Dionne on June 23, 1975, in a trade with the Detroit Red Wings. Dionne was already a superstar in the NHL and he made an immediate impact in the 1975–76 season, scoring 40 goals and adding 54 assists for 94 points in 80 regular season games. He led the Kings to a 38–33–9 record (85 points), earning them a second-place finish in the Norris Division.

Behind Dionne's offensive prowess, the strong goaltending of Rogie Vachon, and the speed and scoring touch of forward Butch Goring, the Kings played two of their most thrilling seasons yet, with playoff matchups against the then-Atlanta Flames (now Calgary Flames) in the first round, and the Boston Bruins in the second round. In the 1976 playoffs, the Kings swept the Flames in two close games both decided by one goal. When matched against the Bruins, the Kings were heavy underdogs against the Bruins. In Game 1, Boston outmatched the Kings 4–0. Game 2 saw stellar goaltending by Vachon, who helped keep the game close until Goring shocked the Boston crowd with the overtime winner. The momentum stayed in game three on home ice with the Kings winning 6–4 thanks to Dionne's hat trick (three goals), which shocked the Bruins as they were now behind in a series in which they were the favorites. Boston took control of games four and five by outscoring the Kings 10–1. When the Kings returned on home ice for game six, the Kings home crowd treated them to one of the loudest crowds ever heard at the Forum, a five-minute standing ovation that delayed the start of the game; players from both sides would later say they never saw anything like it. Boston would jump to a 3–1 lead into the final five minutes, but the Kings would come back thanks to two goals by Mike Corrigan, the tying goal scored after he was tripped by Boston goalie Gerry Cheevers. Then, while lying on his stomach he swiped the puck into the net to tie the game. The comeback then was completed near the final minute of overtime thanks to Goring again, tying the series. However, Boston controlled game seven with a 3–0 shutout and won the series.

In the first round of the 1977 playoffs, the Kings needed three games to defeat the Flames in the opening round, winning both games at home and losing on the road. In the second round, Boston controlled the first two games, and while the Kings put a better effort in game three, the Bruins still won 7–6 to go up three games to none. The Kings finally answered back in game four with a 7–4 win. Game five in Boston saw a game where the Kings were badly out-shot, but in the words of Boston goalie Gerry Cheevers, "Vachon did everything but stand on his head to make great save after great save." The Kings ended up winning 3–1. Game six at home saw the Kings fall behind 3–0 only to tie the game in the third period, but the comeback would end on a sour note as Kings defenseman Dave Hutchison went to clear the puck on a Boston power play but broke his stick on the ice and turned the puck over; and Boston scored to win the game 4–3 and the series four games to two.

Bob Pulford left the Kings after the 1976–77 season after constant feuding with then owner Jack Kent Cooke. Pulford wanted to become general manager as well as coach, or at least have a bigger role in player personnel decisions. Cooke however, often meddled in player personnel matters, which also caused another key component for the Kings, general manager Jake Milford, to leave as well and join the Vancouver Canucks. Now without Pulford and Milford, the Kings struggled in the 1977–78 season as they finished below .500 and were easily swept out of the first round by the Toronto Maple Leafs. Afterwards Vachon would become a free agent and sign with the Detroit Red Wings.

On January 13, 1979, Kings coach Bob Berry tried juggling line combinations, and Dionne found himself on a new line with two young, mostly unknown players: second-year right winger Dave Taylor and left winger Charlie Simmer, who had been a career minor-leaguer. Each player benefited from each other, with Simmer being the gritty player who battled along the boards, Taylor being the play maker, and Dionne being the natural goal scorer. This line combination, known as the "Triple Crown Line", would go on to become one of the highest-scoring line combinations in NHL history.

After the Triple Crown Line's first season together, Dr. Jerry Buss purchased the Kings, the Lakers, and the Forum for $67.5 million.

As the 1970s came to a close and the 1980s began, the Triple Crown Line dominated the NHL, scoring 146 goals and 182 assists, good for 328 points. Marcel Dionne was also awarded the Art Ross Trophy as that season’s highest scorer - scoring just two goals more than a rookie Wayne Gretzky who tied him for 137 points. However, in the first round of the 1980 playoffs, the Kings were eliminated in four games by upstart New York Islanders, who were on their way to winning their first of four straight Stanley Cups. Among the Islanders was Butch Goring, whom the Kings had traded late in the season for Billy Harris and Dave Lewis.

In the 1980–81 season, the Triple Crown line did even better than the season before, scoring a total of 161 goals and 191 assists, good for 352 points. The entire line, along with goalie Mario Lessard, was selected to play in the 1981 NHL All-Star Game that season, which was played at the Forum - including a moment that saw the Triple Crown Line skate out together during player introductions. Another major boost to the Kings was defenseman Larry Murphy, who finished the season with 76 points, setting an NHL record for most points by a rookie defenseman. The Kings also had a remarkable regular season, finishing the 1980–81 season with an impressive 43 wins and 99 points, good for second in the Norris Division. But late in the season, setbacks came in as Charlie Simmer broke his leg, and was unable to play the rest of the season and playoffs. This proved to be the crippling blow for a team that relied almost exclusively on the Triple Crown Line for scoring; and once again, an impressive season was washed out by a first round upset, this time by the New York Rangers in four games.

The 1981–82 Kings saw the team slump to 17th overall and fourth in their division with 63 points, only making the playoffs due to being in the same division as the Colorado Rockies, who finished with 49 (in those days, the top four teams in each division were guaranteed a playoff berth). During that time, the team replaced head coach Bob Berry with assistant coach Parker MacDonald. After coaching 42 games, MacDonald resigned and retired, and was replaced by Don Perry, who just weeks into his tenure was suspended for six games for ordering enforcer Paul Mulvey to join a fight. One of the few brighter spots came late in the season when rookie Bernie Nicholls was called up from the minors, and debuted with 32 points in 22 games.

The Kings opened the 1982 playoffs against the Edmonton Oilers, who were led by a young but fast-rising star by the name of Wayne Gretzky. By the 1981–82 season, he was already the most dominant player in the league, and had made the Oilers one of the elite teams in the NHL, on their way to winning four Stanley Cup championships in the 1980s. The Oilers finished with 111 points.

Therefore, few expected the Kings to stand a chance against the upstart Oilers, especially in their hometown. At first, the Oilers jumped out to a 4-1 lead in the first period, until the Kings managed to cut their lead to 4-3 to end the first. In the second period, The Kings managed to outscore the Oilers 5-2 to give them a 8-6 lead. While the Oilers would tie the game 8-8 midway through the third, Charlie Simmer scored the gamer winner and Bernie Nichols capped an empty net goal to stun the Edmonton home crowd with a 10-8 win. This blow for blow game would set the NHL record as the highest-scoring Stanley Cup Playoff game ever. Game two was a much tighter game, with the Kings even having a 2-1 lead until Jari Kurri tied the game late in the third, and Gretzky winning the game in overtime for the Oilers to tie the series.

At the Forum, game three would be one of the most amazing in hockey history and was later dubbed the "Miracle on Manchester" (the Kings arena, the Forum, was on Manchester Boulevard). In that game, played on April 10, 1982, Gretzky led the Oilers to a commanding 5–0 lead after two periods and it seemed like the Kings were headed for a blowout loss. But the Kings began an unbelievable comeback in the third period, scoring four goals and finally tying the game on a goal by left winger Steve Bozek at 19:55 of the third period and sending the game into overtime.

Bozek's goal set the stage for what was to come. At 2:35 of the overtime period, Kings left winger Daryl Evans fired a slap shot off a face-off in the right circle of the Edmonton zone, passing Oilers goaltender Grant Fuhr over his right shoulder to give the Kings an incredible come-from-behind, overtime victory, 6–5. The Miracle on Manchester, the greatest comeback in NHL playoff history, and the greatest moment in Kings franchise history until 2012. Game 4 however, saw the Oilers bounce back with a 3-2 win, sending the series for a 5th and deciding game in Edmonton. This time, the Kings jumped ahead with a 2-0 lead, and went on to win the game 7-4, completing the miraculous comeback and upset. However, in the second round, the Kings would lose in to the Vancouver Canucks in five games.

Despite Dionne's leadership, the Kings missed the playoffs in the next two seasons. On January 30, 1984, Rogie Vachon became general manager of the Kings. During the 1983–84 season, he coached the team for two games in 1984 after replacing Don Perry and Roger Neilson coached the team's final 28 games. After the season the team named Pat Quinn head coach. The 1984-85 Kings improved to a playoff spot, But they were quickly swept out of the playoffs by the Oilers in 1984–85, when the Oilers won their second-straight Stanley Cup championship. Vachon also became the first player in team history to have his jersey retired on February 14, 1985. Dionne's time with the Kings ended on March 10, 1987, when he was traded to the New York Rangers. By this time, the Kings had new skaters to help lead them into the next decade, including star forwards Bernie Nicholls, Jimmy Carson, Luc Robitaille, and defenseman Steve Duchesne.

Even before the Dionne trade, the Kings were sent reeling when coach Pat Quinn signed a contract to become coach and general manager of the Vancouver Canucks with just months left on his Kings contract. NHL President John Ziegler suspended Quinn for the rest of the season and barred him from taking over Vancouver's hockey operations until June. Ziegler also barred him from coaching anywhere in the NHL until the 1990–91 season. In Ziegler's view, Quinn's actions created a serious conflict of interest that could only be resolved by having him removed as coach.

Despite these shocks, Mike Murphy who played thirteen season with the Kings and was their captain for seven years, replaced Quinn as coach. The Kings made the playoffs in the next two seasons, but they were unable to get out of the first round. After a slow start to the 1987–88 season, Murphy was fired and Vachon coached the team for one game until promoting AHL's New Haven Nighthawks coach Robbie Ftorek as new head coach. Part of the problem was that the way the playoffs were structured (teams were bracketed and seeded by division) made it very likely that they would have to get past either the powerful Oilers or Calgary Flames (or both) to reach the Conference Finals. In all, the Kings faced either the Oilers or the Flames in the playoffs four times during the 1980s.

For most of the 1980s, unlike their shared basketball tenant at the Forum, the Kings struggled at the box office, being among the lowest attended teams in the league. The league's 1981 realignment and the departure of the Colorado Rockies in 1982 left the Kings not only as the only U.S. team west and south of St. Louis, but also as the only American team in its division. Frequent visits from teams hailing from relatively unknown cities on the Canadian Prairie Provinces made marketing the team extremely difficult, even when it was relatively competitive on the ice. By 1983, the Kings' off ice woes were so bad that the team was one of the few U.S. teams to seriously consider supporting the audacious bid of flamboyant Saskatchewan businessman Bill Hunter to move the St. Louis Blues to Saskatoon, Saskatchewan, presumably on the assumption that the Kings would have switched divisions with Hunter's team and thus joined the mostly American Norris Division. Ultimately, once it became obvious Hunter's bid had no chance of gaining approval, the Kings voted with most of the league against that proposal.

However, the 1988–89 season would be a big turning point for the franchise.

== McNall brings Gretzky to LA (1988–1996) ==
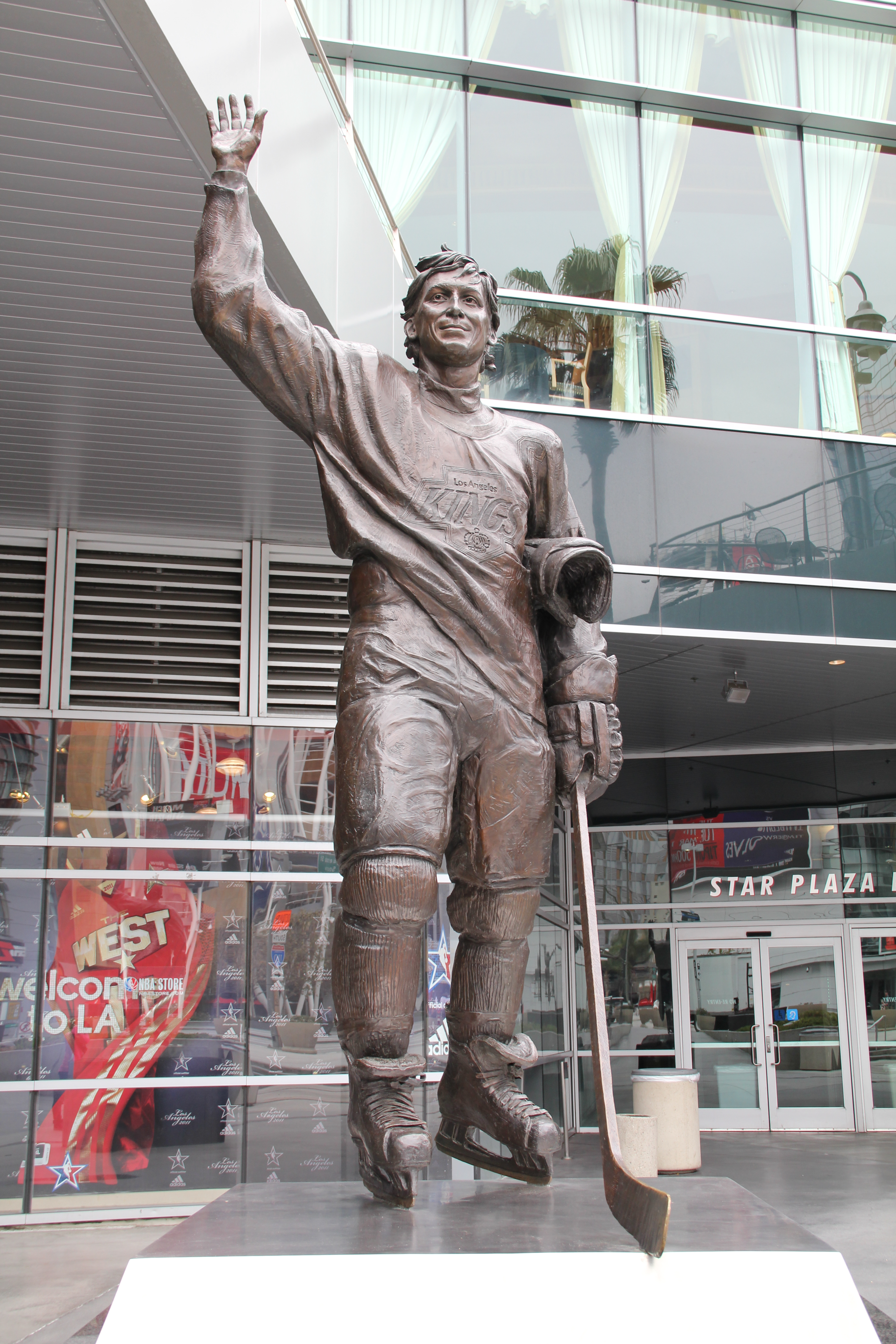
Statue of Wayne Gretzky outside Crypto.com Arena. Gretzky played with the Kings from 1988 to 1996.

In 1987, coin collector Bruce McNall purchased the Kings from Buss and turned the team into a Stanley Cup contender almost overnight. On August 9, 1988, McNall acquired the league's best player, Wayne Gretzky, in a blockbuster trade with the Edmonton Oilers. The trade rocked the hockey world, especially north of the border where Canadians mourned the loss of a player they considered a national treasure. McNall changed the team colors to silver and black.

In Gretzky's first season with the Kings, he led the team in scoring with 168 points on 54 goals and 114 assists, and won his ninth Hart Memorial Trophy as the league's Most Valuable Player. He led the Kings to a second-place finish in the Smythe Division with a 42–31–7 record (91 points), and they ranked fourth in the NHL overall. The Kings faced Gretzky's old team, the Oilers, in the first round of the 1989 playoffs. They fell behind three games to one, but rallied to take the series in seven games, helped in no small part by nine goals from Chris Kontos, a little-known player who had just recently been called up from the minor leagues. However, the Kings were quickly swept out of the playoffs in the second round by the eventual Stanley Cup champion Flames. Moreover, Gretzky also clashed with the Kings’ head coach, Robbie Ftorek. At season's end, Ftorek was fired and replaced by Tom Webster.

The next season saw Gretzky become the league's all-time leading scorer. On October 15, 1989, in Edmonton, he assisted on a Bernie Nicholls goal to tie Gordie Howe's career record of 1,850 points, then broke it late in the contest on a game-tying goal against Bill Ranford. The goal forced overtime, where Gretzky capped a spectacular night by scoring again to win the game for Los Angeles. At season's end, the Kings finished fourth and faced the defending champion Flames in the first round. This time, they defeated Calgary in six games, two of which had dramatic overtimes — Tony Granato won Game 3 with a short-handed goal, and Mike Krushelnyski scored a strange goal to win Game 6 while he was flat on his back. However, the Kings were swept in the second round by the eventual champion Oilers, who were seeking revenge for their loss of the previous year.

Gretzky spearheaded the Kings to their first regular-season division title in franchise history in the 1990–91 season with a 46–24–10 record (102 points, the second-best point total in franchise history). Notably, it was the first time in ten years that a team from Alberta had not finished first in the Smythe. However, the heavily-favored Kings struggled in the playoffs, going down two games to one in the first round against fourth-place Vancouver before regrouping to win the next three games to eliminate the Canucks. In the second round against Edmonton, the series saw four games go into overtime; but once again, the Oilers prevailed in the close series to eliminate the Kings.

The 1991–92 season, the Kings' 25th as a franchise, witnessed seven Kings players score over twenty goals. Gretzky, who missed the first month of the season due to a back injury suffered during the 1991 Canada Cup, had a then-career low in scoring, yet led the league in assists and finished third in points behind Pittsburgh Penguins stars Mario Lemieux and Kevin Stevens. Gretzky’s former Edmonton teammates Jari Kurri, Paul Coffey, and Charlie Huddy also joined him in Los Angeles for this season. But even with more of Gretzky’s 1980s Oiler dynasty teammates at his side, and with the Oilers losing dynasty-era players in general, Los Angeles again failed to thwart their Edmonton rivals in the post-season, losing to the Oilers in a six-game upset in the first round. This marked the third straight year that the Gretzky-led Kings were eliminated from the playoffs by his former team. At the end of the season, McNall fired Webster as head coach and reassigned general manager Vachon to a different role within the organization. Nick Beverley was named Vachon's successor as general manager, and Barry Melrose, then with the Adirondack Red Wings of the American Hockey League (AHL), was hired as the Kings’ new head coach.

The Kings' status as contenders, combined with Gretzky's stardom, generated excitement about hockey and the NHL that had never been seen before in Southern California. Virtually overnight, as soon as Gretzky donned a Kings jersey, the buzz made Kings home games the hottest ticket in town, with many Hollywood celebrities and well known public figures frequently seen attending. The Kings had gone from generating the lowest attendance figures in the league in 1985-86 to selling out every home game in 1991-92. The popularity of Gretzky and the Kings also led to the NHL awarding an expansion team to Anaheim, California in 1993; the Mighty Ducks of Anaheim (later renamed to Anaheim Ducks in 2006) would become the Kings nearest rival, just 35 miles (56 km) to the south. Gretzky's popularity in Southern California also led to the NHL expanding or moving into other Sun Belt cities such as Dallas, Phoenix, Tampa, Miami, Atlanta (now in Winnipeg since 2011), and Nashville throughout the 1990s.

=== First trip to the Stanley Cup Final (1992–1993) ===
The Kings would reach new heights in the 1992–93 season, but the season started badly when it was learned that Gretzky had suffered a career-threatening herniated thoracic disk before the season began. But even without their captain and leading scorer, the Kings got off to a 20–8–3 start, led by Luc Robitaille, who filled in as captain as Gretzky missed the Kings' first 39 games. Although Gretzky came back to score 16 goals and 49 assists, good for 65 points in just 45 games, Robitaille still lead the team's scoring with 63 goals and 62 assists (125 points) in 84 regular season games, setting new NHL all-time records for goals and points scored by a left winger in a single season. The Kings finished with a 39–35–10 record (88 points), clinching third place in the Smythe Division.

The 1993 playoffs began with the Kings' offense in full force, scoring 33 goals as they beat the Flames 4–2. In the second round, the Kings faced the heavily favored Vancouver Canucks, a team that had beaten the Kings seven times in nine games during the regular season, and had not lost to the Kings in their four meetings in Vancouver. But the Kings would go on to eliminate the Canucks in six games, with the pivotal victory coming in game five at Vancouver, where the Kings took the series lead as winger Gary Shuchuk scored at 6:31 of the second overtime period.

In the Campbell Conference Finals, the Kings were even more of an underdog against the Doug Gilmour-led Toronto Maple Leafs. After winning game five on overtime, the Leafs had a chance to eliminate the Kings at The Forum. Game six had the Kings open 4–2 before Leafs captain Wendel Clark scored twice in the third period to force overtime. During extra time, Robitaille assisted on Gretzky's goal to give his team a dramatic 5–4 victory and force a game seven at Maple Leaf Gardens. The game was not without controversy, however. Just prior to the winning goal, Gretzky clipped Gilmour in the face with his stick, but referee Kerry Fraser did not call a penalty, allowing Gretzky to score the winning goal moments later. In the final contest, Gretzky scored a hat trick (three goals) and had an assist to lead the Kings to a 5–4 win and a berth in the Stanley Cup Final for the first time in franchise history.

In the Stanley Cup Final, the Kings faced the Montreal Canadiens. After winning the opening match 4–1, the Kings suffered a turnaround during game two. Late in the contest, with the Kings leading by a score of 2–1, Canadiens coach Jacques Demers requested a measurement of Kings defenseman Marty McSorley's stick blade. His suspicions proved to be correct, as the curve of blade was too great, and McSorley was penalized. The Canadiens pulled their goalie, Patrick Roy, giving them a two-man advantage, and Eric Desjardins scored on the resulting power play to tie the game. Montreal went on to win the game in overtime on another goal by Desjardins, and the Kings never led in the series again. They dropped the next two games at home in overtime, and lost game five, 4–1, giving the Canadiens the 24th Stanley Cup in franchise history.

== Bankruptcy and decline (1993–1997) ==
The period after the 1993 playoff run saw the Kings fall on hard times. Wayne Gretzky returned to his All-Star form for the 1993–94 season, leading the team with 38 goals and 92 assists for 130 points and winning his final Art Ross Trophy as the league's leading scorer. On March 23, 1994, Gretzky surpassed Gordie Howe's NHL record for goals and became the all-time NHL leader in goals, assists, and points. Still, despite Gretzky's leadership, and the individual efforts of Robitaille, Kurri, and Blake, the Kings never recovered from a sluggish November and December and slumped to fifth place in the new Pacific Division with only 66 points, missing the playoffs for the first time since 1986. To add insult to injury, their newly established cross-freeway rivals, the Mighty Ducks of Anaheim, finished ahead of them in the division (both in attendance and in the standings), and their cross-state rivals, the San Jose Sharks, made their first playoff appearance in only their third season, nearly making the Conference Finals.

By 1992, Kings owner Bruce McNall was elected chairman of the NHL's Board of Governors, the second-most powerful post in the league. His support of Gary Bettman tipped the scales in favor of Bettman's election as the league's first commissioner. However, in December 1993, McNall defaulted on a $90 million loan from Bank of America for which he had used the Kings as collateral; Bank of America threatened to force the team into bankruptcy unless it was sold by the end of the month. Despite an offer from Sony Corporation to buy the club, McNall instead sold the team to IDB Communications founder Jeffrey Sudikoff and former Madison Square Garden president Joseph Cohen. The sale closed in May 1994 amid a federal investigation into his financial practices. McNall also resigned from his position on the NHL Board of Governors, and ultimately pleaded guilty to five counts of conspiracy and fraud, and admitted to obtaining $236 million in fraudulent loans from six banks over ten years. In January 1997, he was sentenced to 70 months in prison. It later emerged that McNall's free-spending ways put the Kings in serious financial trouble. At one point, Cohen and Sudikoff were even unable to meet player payroll, and were ultimately forced into bankruptcy in 1995.

At the same time, several personnel decisions backfired on the club. In August 1993, shortly after matching an five-year offer sheet from the St. Louis Blues for McSorley, the Kings had traded him to the Pittsburgh Penguins in exchange for Shawn McEachern. However, after McSorley struggled in Pittsburgh, the Kings basically reversed the trade in February 1994, sending Tomas Sandström (who had scored 41 points in 51 games that season) and McEachern to the Penguins to reacquire McSorley alongside Jim Paek. Thus, although the popular McSorley returned to Los Angeles, the team was forced to part with the talented Sandström for him do so. After the 1993–94 season, general manager Nick Beverley was fired and replaced by Sam McMaster. In his first major deal, McMaster swung another trade with the Penguins, swapping Robitaille to Pittsburgh for Rick Tocchet. McMaster believed that the gritty Tocchet would provide needed toughness, but in the process the Kings lost Robitaille, a 50-goal scorer and fan favorite.

While the Kings still had some talent on their roster in the forms of Gretzky, Blake, Kurri, and McSorley heading into the 1994–95 season, they had little else. In February 1995, McMaster acquired another of Gretzky's old Edmonton teammates, aging goaltender Grant Fuhr, as well as two young defensemen, in a six-player deal with the Buffalo Sabres, but gave up two defensive stalwarts, as Alexei Zhitnik and Charlie Huddy went to Buffalo in the trade. The team continued to stumble, and a late-season cold streak hindered their playoff chances, putting the Kings within one game of clinching the 8th playoff spot, but losing the final game that season to finish in ninth place with 41 points, one point under the eighth seeded Dallas Stars. During that time, the Kings fired Barry Melrose, leaving Rogie Vachon to coach the team's final seven games in the 1994–95 season. After the season, Larry Robinson who played three seasons for the Kings from 1989 to 1992, was named head coach after winning the 1995 Stanley Cup as an assistant coach with the New Jersey Devils.

On October 6, 1995, one day before the 1995–96 season opener, the bankruptcy court approved the purchase of the Kings by Phillip Anschutz and Edward P. Roski for $113.5 million. Larry Robinson's first season as the Kings coach initially saw the Kings begin their first 20 games with a 10-5-5 record, and being well within playoff contention through mid November. However, several mid season losing streaks in December, January, and February slumped the team in a free fall down the standings in the conference, where they would ultimately finish sixth place in the Pacific Division, and second to last in the Western Conference with only 66 points.

Now approaching the twilight years of his career, Gretzky wanted another chance to win a title before retirement. However, frustrations with the organization and team during the slumping season led to Gretzky pressuring management by demanding the Kings acquire suitable talent - a high scoring forward and an offensive defenseman to play alongside him, or he would seek to play elsewhere when his contract expired at the end of the season. Unfortunately, the ongoing bankruptcy issues made it near fiscally impossible given the chances of players checks bouncing. On February 27, 1996, Gretzky was traded to the St. Louis Blues, for young forwards Craig Johnson, Patrice Tardif, Roman Vopat, a first-round pick in the 1997 draft (Matt Zultek) and a fifth-round choice in the 1996 draft (Peter Hogan). With the exception of Craig Johnson who would earn a mainstay spot on the roster for seven more seasons, the rest of the players involved were gone within much shorter amounts of time, and neither draft pick acquired from the trade played a single game for the Kings, thus making it one of the worst trades in franchise history.

Shortly after Gretzky was traded, Rob Blake was named team captain, and the Kings then traded Marty McSorley, Jari Kurri and Shane Churla to the New York Rangers for Mattias Norstrom, Nathan LaFayette, Ian Laperriere, Ray Ferraro, and a draft pick. The oft-maligned general manager Sam McMaster, nicknamed by fans “McMaster the Disaster,” was fired and replaced by former Kings winger Dave Taylor. But the rebuilding phase for Taylor was a tough one, as the Kings suffered one more forgettable season in 1996–97, again finishing second to last in their conference with 67 points.

== Playoff contention years, and the move to Staples Center (1997–2002) ==
In the 1997–98 season, the Kings finish second in the Pacific Division with 87 Points. They were led by strong players Jozef Stumpel and Glen Murray, and Blake also became the first Kings defensemen to win the James Norris Trophy as the NHL's best defenseman after recording a career-high 23 goals and 50 points. Luc Robitaille would also return, though he would be plagued by injuries throughout the season. The Kings were matched against the highly skilled St. Louis Blues, and after losing the first two games on the road, had a chance to bring life back to the Kings for game three. Leading 3–0 in the third with 11:28 left, Blues forward Geoff Courtnall charged into Kings goalie Jamie Storr while Storr was out playing the puck, in immediate response, Kings defenseman Sean O'Donnell viciously attacked Courtnall from behind, resulting in a five-minute major penalty for O'Donnell and power play for St. Louis. The Blues rallied and scored four goals in the next three minutes and seven seconds during the power play to win game three 4–3, and then won game four 2–1 to sweep the Kings. The Kings suffered though a 1998–99 injury-plagued season as they finished last in the Pacific Division and missed the playoffs with a 32-45-5 record. Despite this, Robitaille would return to his all-star form. This was their final season at the Great Western Forum, (Due to the fact that the Great Western Bank ceased to exist two seasons prior, the arena name was replaced by the team name on center ice). Head coach Larry Robinson was fired afterwards.

Taylor turned to Andy Murray, who became the Kings' 19th head coach on June 14, 1999. Taylor's hiring of Murray was immediately criticized by media across North America because of Murray's perceived lack of experience — up to that point, his only head coaching experience had been at the international level with the Canadian National Team and at the US high school level. Indeed, Taylor took a gamble on Murray, hoping it would pay off. But Taylor was not finished dealing that summer. Shortly after hiring Murray, Taylor acquired star right-wing Zigmund Palffy and veteran center Bryan Smolinski on June 20, 1999, in exchange for center prospect Olli Jokinen, winger prospect Josh Green, defenseman prospect Mathieu Biron and the Kings' first-round pick in the 1999 NHL entry draft.

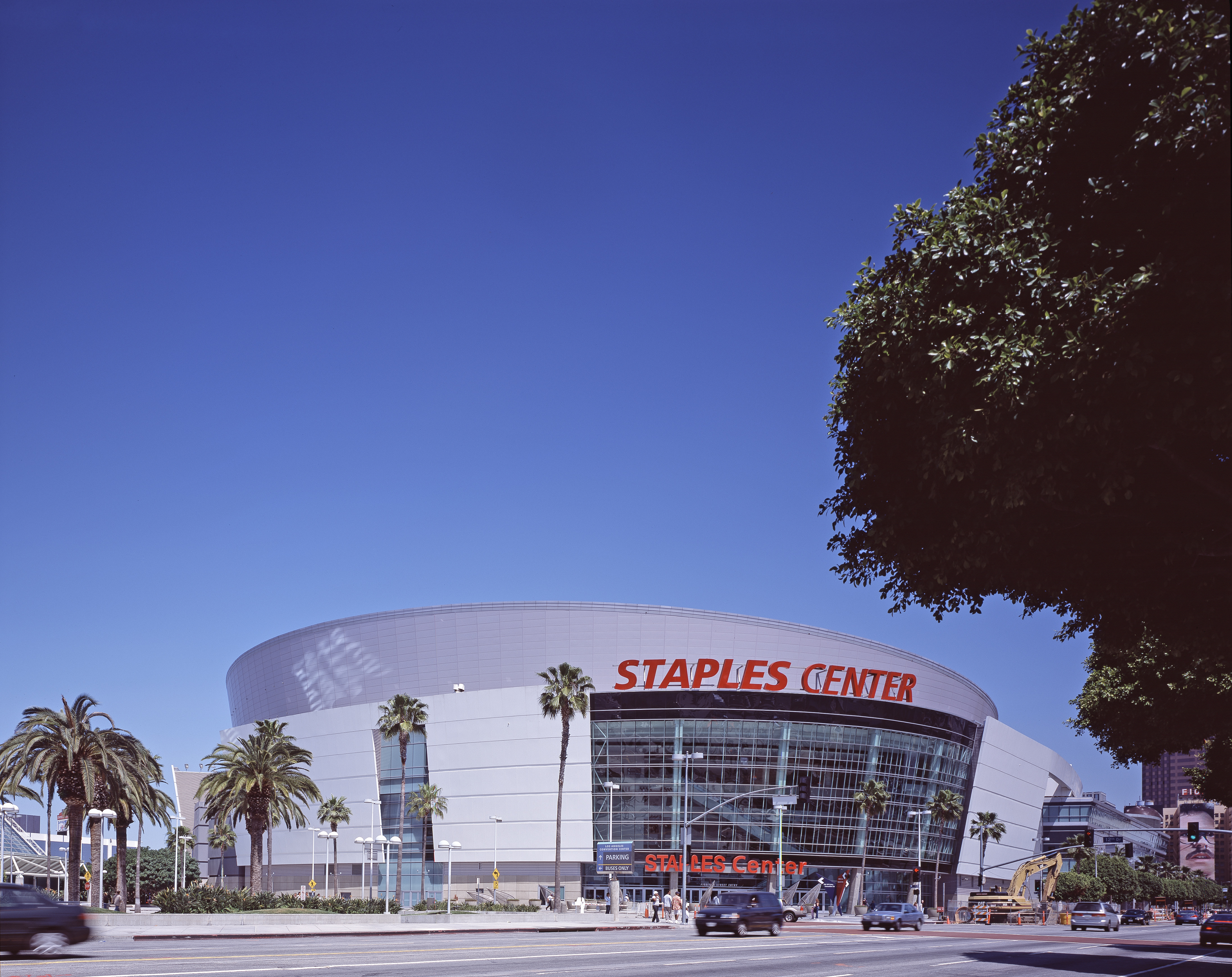
The Kings moved into the Staples Center in 1999.

The Kings, along with the Los Angeles Lakers, made an even bigger move in 1999, as they left The Forum, after 32 seasons, and moved to the Staples Center in downtown Los Angeles, which was built by Anschutz and Roski. Staples Center was a state-of-the-art arena, complete with luxury suites and all the modern amenities that fans and athletes would want in a brand-new facility.

With a new home, a new coach, a potential 50-goal scorer in the fold and players such as Rob Blake, Luc Robitaille, Glen Murray, Jozef Stumpel, Donald Audette, Ian Laperriere and Mattias Norstrom, the Kings improved dramatically, finishing the season the 1999–2000 season with a 39–31–12–4 record (94 points), good for second place in the Pacific Division. But in the 2000 playoffs, the Kings were again eliminated in the first round, this time by the Detroit Red Wings in a four-game sweep.

In the 2000 NHL entry draft, the Kings drafted in the first round Alexander Frolov with the 20th-overall pick and in the fourth round drafted Lubomir Visnovsky 118th overall. The 2000–01 season was a controversial one, as fans began to question AEG's commitment to the success of the Kings because they failed to significantly improve the team during the off-season. Adding fuel to the fire was the February 21, 2001, trade of star defenseman and fan favorite Rob Blake.

In that deal, the Kings sent Blake and center Steven Reinprecht, to the Colorado Avalanche in exchange for right wing Adam Deadmarsh, defenseman Aaron Miller, center prospect Jared Aulin and a first-round pick in the 2001 NHL entry draft (Dave Steckel). After Blake's departure, Mattias Norstrom became the Kings' 13th captain, then the Kings acquired goaltender Felix Potvin from the Vancouver Canucks; Deadmarsh and Miller became impact players for the Kings, who finished the 2000–01 season with a 38–28–13–3 record (92 points), good for a third-place finish in the Pacific Division and another first-round playoff date with the Detroit Red Wings.

The heavily favored Red Wings — many predicted another four-game sweep — made easy work of the Kings in games one and two at the Joe Louis Arena, but the Kings got back in the series with a 2–1 win in game three at Staples Center.

In game four, the Red Wings took a commanding 3–0 lead after two periods. This set the stage for yet another unbelievable playoff comeback for the Kings, highly reminiscent of the "Miracle on Manchester", back in 1982. Seldom-used forward Scott Thomas, a career minor-leaguer, scored a power play goal at 13:53. The Red Wings were called for a penalty with just under three minutes to play and Kings' coach Andy Murray gambled and pulled his goalie to give his team a two-man advantage. The gamble paid off as Jozef Stumpel would follow with another power play goal at 17:33. Finally, Bryan Smolinski tied the game at the 19:07 mark. In the overtime, Deadmarsh stole the puck from Red Wings' star defenseman Chris Chelios in the right corner behind the Detroit net, and threw a centering pass to center Eric Belanger, who scored the game-winning goal at 2:36 to lift the Kings to a miraculous come-from-behind win, now known as the "Frenzy on Figueroa", or the "Stunner at Staples." That win would help the Kings eliminate the Red Wings in game six by winning four straight games after going down 2–0 in the series. It was the Kings' first playoff series win since 1993.

In the second round, the Kings went up against another elite team, the Colorado Avalanche, led by superstars Joe Sakic, Peter Forsberg, Patrick Roy, Ray Bourque, playing in his last NHL season, and former teammate Rob Blake. The Kings won game one by a score of 4–3 in overtime, but then lost the next three games. Down three games to one and facing elimination, the Kings bounced back with two 1–0 shut-out victories, including the most memorable game of that series being game six where goalies Patrick Roy of Colorado and Felix Potvin of the Kings battled to a scoreless tie after regulation and into the second overtime; finally after 64 shots on goal that were saved between both goalies, a slap shot by Kings Glen Murray found the back of the net for the win and thus tied the series. Game seven saw a 1–1 tie after two periods, however Colorado dominated the third period with four unanswered goals to win the game 5–1 and the series. Colorado would eventually win the Stanley Cup that year.

Afterwards, during the off-season, Luc Robitaille turn down a one-year deal with a substantial pay cut and ended up signing with Detroit, as the Red Wings represented his best chance at winning the Stanley Cup, and like Tomas Sandstrom before him in 1997, Robitaille won the Stanley Cup with Detroit in 2002.

The 2001–02 season started off with tragedy as team scouts Garnet "Ace" Bailey and Mark Bavis were both casualties of the September 11th attack. The team honored the two by wearing "AM" patches on their jerseys. The Kings drafted Michael Cammalleri 49th-overall in the second round of the 2001 NHL draft. Earlier in the season, the team acquired Jason Allison who was involved in a contract dispute along with Mikko Eloranta from the Boston Bruins in return for Jozef Stumpel and Glen Murray. At mid-season they hosted the 2002 NHL All-Star Game, the last NHL All-Star game that used the North America vs. the World All-Star format, where the Kings were represented by Zigmund Pallfy and star defenseman Jaroslav Modry on the World team. Jason Allison, Palffy and Adam Deadmarsh would form another thrilling scoring line nicknamed the "L.A.P.D. Line" (combining the three initials of Allison, Palffy and Deadmarsh, with a reference to the Los Angeles Police Department), highly reminiscent of the Triple Crown Line of old. While not as successful scoring-wise, they still led the team with a combination of 80 goals, and 115 assists, a total of 195 points. The Kings started off the season with a sluggish October and November, and then found their game again to finish with 95 points. They in fact were tied in points with the second place Phoenix Coyotes, and only finished third in the Pacific Division and seventh in the West due to a goals-for differential—the Coyotes having 228 and the Kings having 214 as a team. In the playoffs they met the Colorado Avalanche again, this time in the first round. The series would prove to be a carbon copy of their previous meeting, with the Kings behind three games to one and bouncing back to tie the series, only to be dominated in the seventh game and eliminated.

== Rebuilding (2002–2009) ==
The next two seasons would be major disappointments as the Kings hit another major decline. While Zigmund Palffy led the team in scoring with 85 points in the 2002–03 season, his two L.A.P.D. linemates, Jason Allison and Adam Deadmarsh, both suffered concussions and missed the majority of the season. Despite being at 15–10–4–3 in mid-December, the Kings lost 14 of their next 19 games and never recovered. They eventually finished the season tenth in the West and missed the 2003 playoffs. During the subsequent off-season, Luc Robitaille returned to the Kings after two seasons with the Detroit Red Wings, and would go on to lead the team in scoring for the 2003–04 season. However, Palffy suffered shoulder injuries of his own and sat out the majority of the season, while his two L.A.P.D. linemates sat out the entire season, with Deadmarsh later retiring after the 2004–05 NHL lockout and Allison playing one last season with the Toronto Maple Leafs before ultimately retiring. With a record of 28–20–16–7 and 81 points and 11 games left in the season, the Kings looked to be in contention for the 2004 playoffs, and Head Coach Andy Murray was just one win away from becoming the coach with the most wins in franchise history. Los Angeles, however, lost all 11 remaining games, squandering their playoff chances and delaying Murray's eventual record. Statistically, for the 2002–03 season, the Kings lost a franchise-record 536 man-games (number of games missed by individual players) due to injury; in comparison, for the 2003–04 season, they broke a previous NHL record with 629 man-games lost to injury.

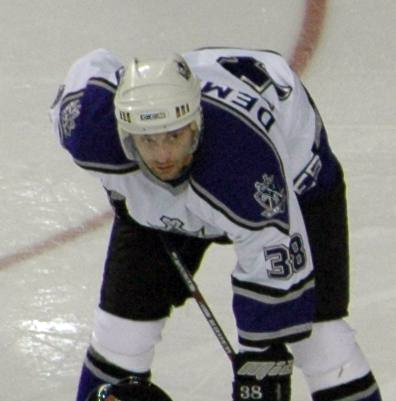
Pavol Demitra with the Kings, December 2005. The Kings signed Demitra as a free agent in the 2005.

The team drafted Dustin Brown with the 13th overall pick in the first round of the 2003 NHL entry draft. Following the resumption of play after the 2004–05 NHL lockout, the Kings drafted Anze Kopitar with the 11th pick in 2005 and goaltender Jonathan Quick in the third round, 72nd overall. In free agency, the team acquired Valeri Bure, Craig Conroy, Jeremy Roenick and Pavol Demitra for the 2005–06 season. The Kings also had young talented forwards with Alexander Frolov, Michael Cammalleri and Dustin Brown, as well as strong offensive prowess from defenseman Lubomir Visnovsky, who led the team in points.

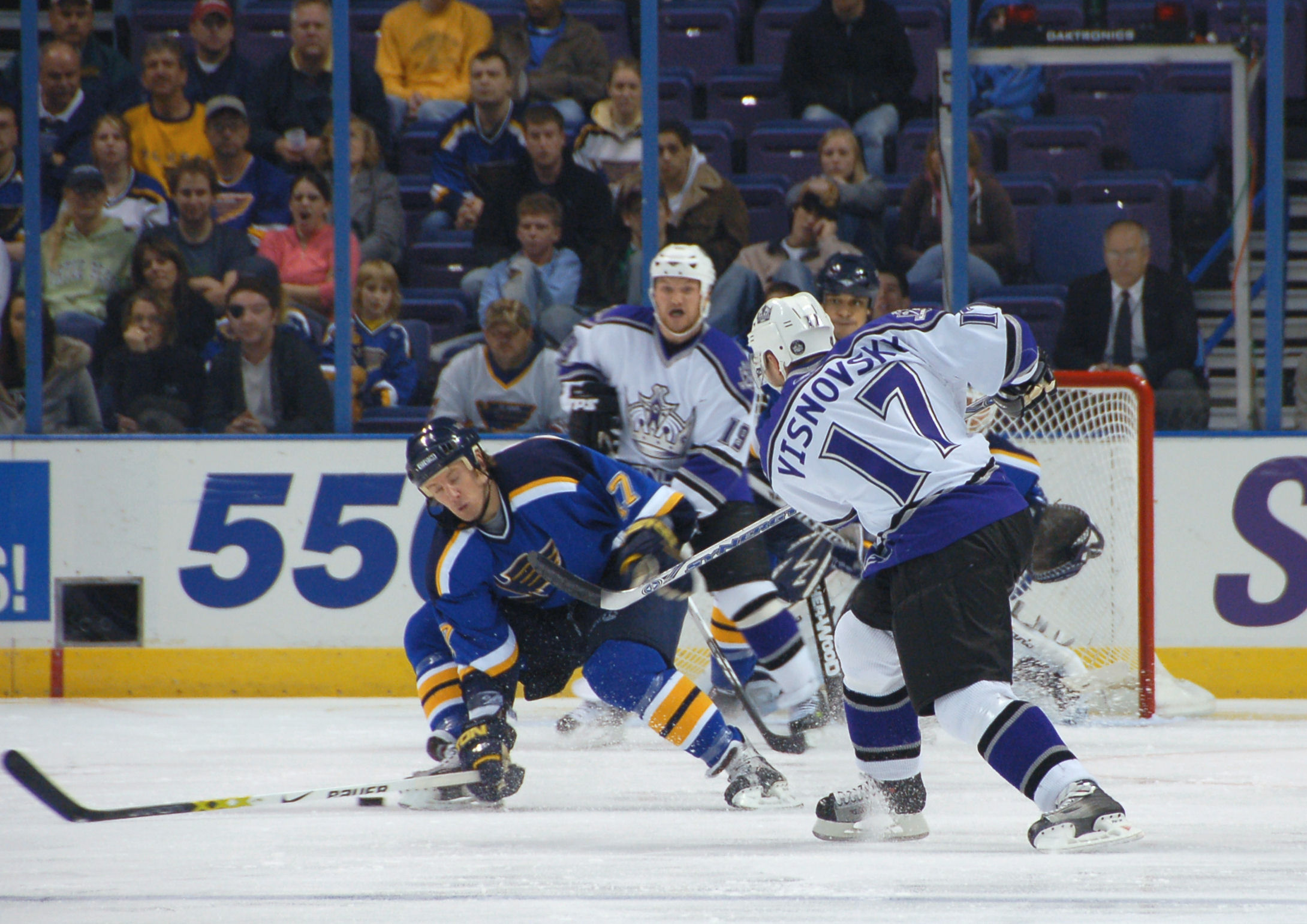
Lubomir Visnovsky led the Kings in points in 2005-06. He would be named to the All-Star Game the following season.

The first game of the 2005–06 season, in which the Kings jumped to a 4–0 lead only to let it slip away in a 5–4 loss to the Dallas Stars, would ultimately forecast how the remainder of the season would progress; Los Angeles began the season strongly, but the campaign's second half saw the team stumble, free-falling from second place in the Western Conference in early January to seventh place by the Olympic break in the middle of February. While the Kings still looked to be in contention for the 2006 playoffs, injuries again played a factor during and after the 2006 Winter Olympics, of which the Kings had six players representing. Defensemen Mattias Norstrom and Aaron Miller suffering from a concussion and a back injury, respectively, prevented the two from even participating in the Games; Frolov separated his shoulder during a round robin game and missed ten games after, and the Kings' leading goal-scorer, Pavol Demitra, missed six games after being struck in the face with a puck in the tournament quarterfinals. Afterwards, the Kings lost 12 of their remaining 22 games left in the season, and eventually finished tenth in the West. On March 21, 2006, the team fired head coach Andy Murray, replacing him on an interim basis with John Torchetti. With three games left in the season, Luc Robitaille, the team's all-time leading scorer and the NHL's all-time highest-scoring left winger, announced that, at the end of the year, he would retire.

Just one day after the end of the Kings' 2005–06 regular season, AEG decided to clean house. On April 18, 2006, President of Hockey Operations and General Manager Dave Taylor and Director of Player Personnel Bill O'Flaherty were relieved of their duties, and Vice President and Assistant General Manager Kevin Gilmore was reassigned to other duties within AEG. Interim Head Coach John Torchetti and assistant coaches Mark Hardy and Ray Bennett, along with Goaltending Consultant Andy Nowicki, were also fired. Tim Leiweke also announced that he would no longer serve in his role as chief executive officer (CEO).

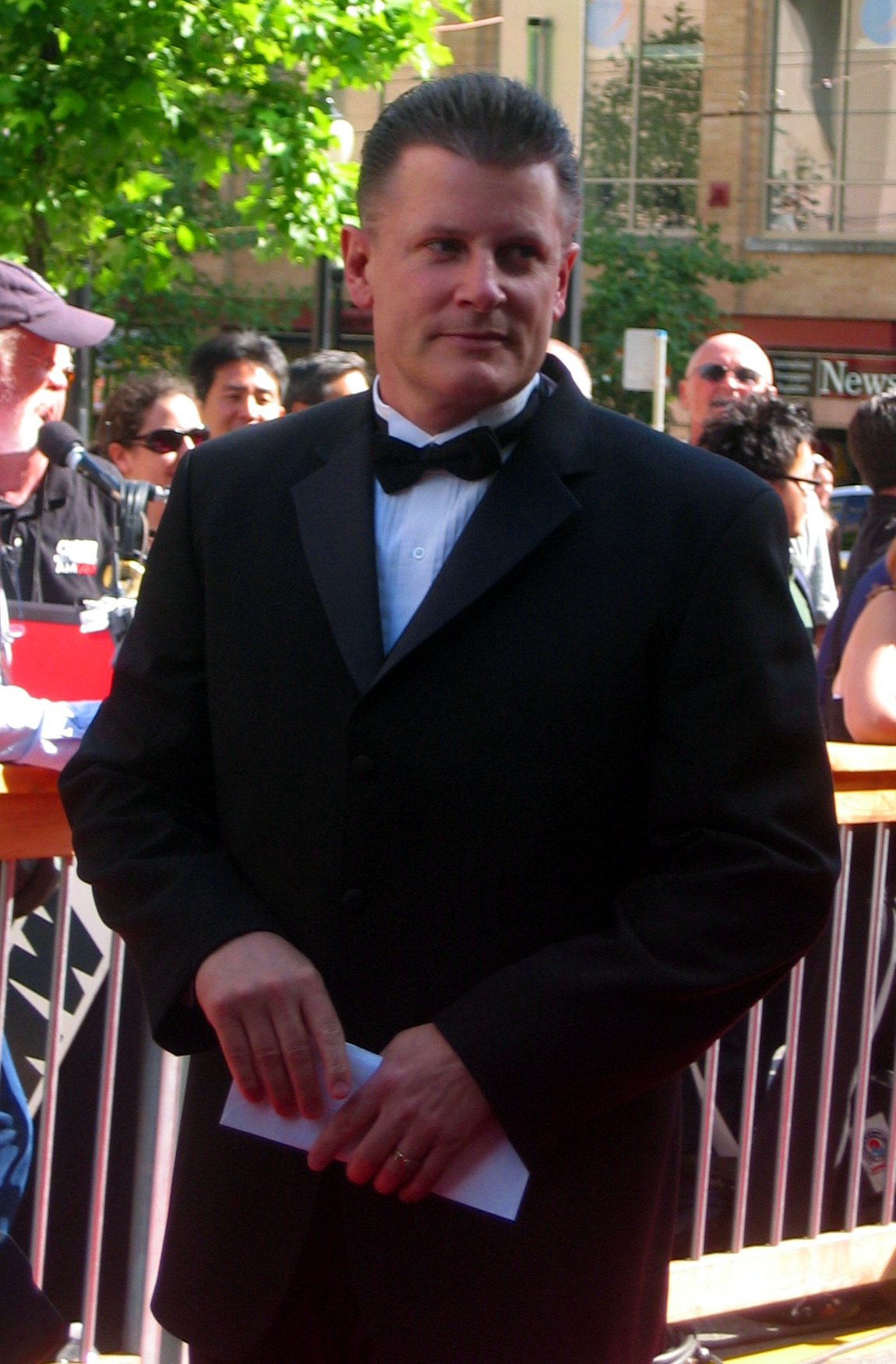
Marc Crawford in June 2006, a month after he was named the head coach for the Kings.

On April 21, 2006, the Kings hired Philadelphia Flyers scout and former San Jose Sharks general manager Dean Lombardi as president and general manager, signing him to a five-year contract. Soon after he was hired, Lombardi quickly began to revamp the Kings' hockey operations and just barely over one month into his tenure, on May 22, 2006, he hired Marc Crawford to be the Kings' 21st head coach. In the 2006 off-season, Roenick signed with the Phoenix Coyotes; Bure, who didn't play the 2005–06 season due to injuries, retired; and Demitra was traded to the Minnesota Wild in exchange for Patrick O'Sullivan and Trevor Lewis. Additionally, Lombardi acquired the rights to Jack Johnson, along with Oleg Tverdovsky, from the Carolina Hurricanes in exchange for Tim Gleason and Eric Belanger. Via free agency, Rob Blake returned to the Kings.

There were few highlights for the Kings during the 2006–07 season, where the Kings had their worst performance in a decade with 68 points and finishing as the second-to-last in the West while their cross town rivals became the first team in California to win the Stanley Cup. They finished second to last by defeating the worst in the west, the Phoenix Coyotes, in the last game of the season. On January 13, 2007, the Kings made hockey history by putting Yutaka Fukufuji in goal for the third period of a game with the St. Louis Blues. This marked the first time in hockey history that a Japanese-born player played in an NHL regular season game. On January 20, 2007, the Kings retired Luc Robitaille's jersey in an hour-long ceremony prior to a game with the Phoenix Coyotes. It was the fifth Kings jersey to be retired.

Before the 2007–08 season, the Kings selected Wayne Simmonds 61st overall, Alec Martinez 95th overall and Dwight King 109th overall at the 2007 NHL entry draft, also signing six unrestricted free agents — center Michal Handzus, left wingers Ladislav Nagy and Kyle Calder and defensemen Tom Preissing, Brad Stuart and Jon Klemm. Rob Blake was then named the team's 14th captain after longtime captain Mattias Norstrom was traded to the Dallas Stars in February 2007. However, despite opening the season with a win against the defending Stanley Cup champion Anaheim Ducks in the first NHL regular season game in Europe at the O2 Arena (also owned by AEG) in London, England, the new acquisitions did little to change the Kings' fortunes, as the team finished with the second-worst record in the league. On June 10, 2008, shortly after the end of the season, Los Angeles announced the firing of Head Coach Marc Crawford.

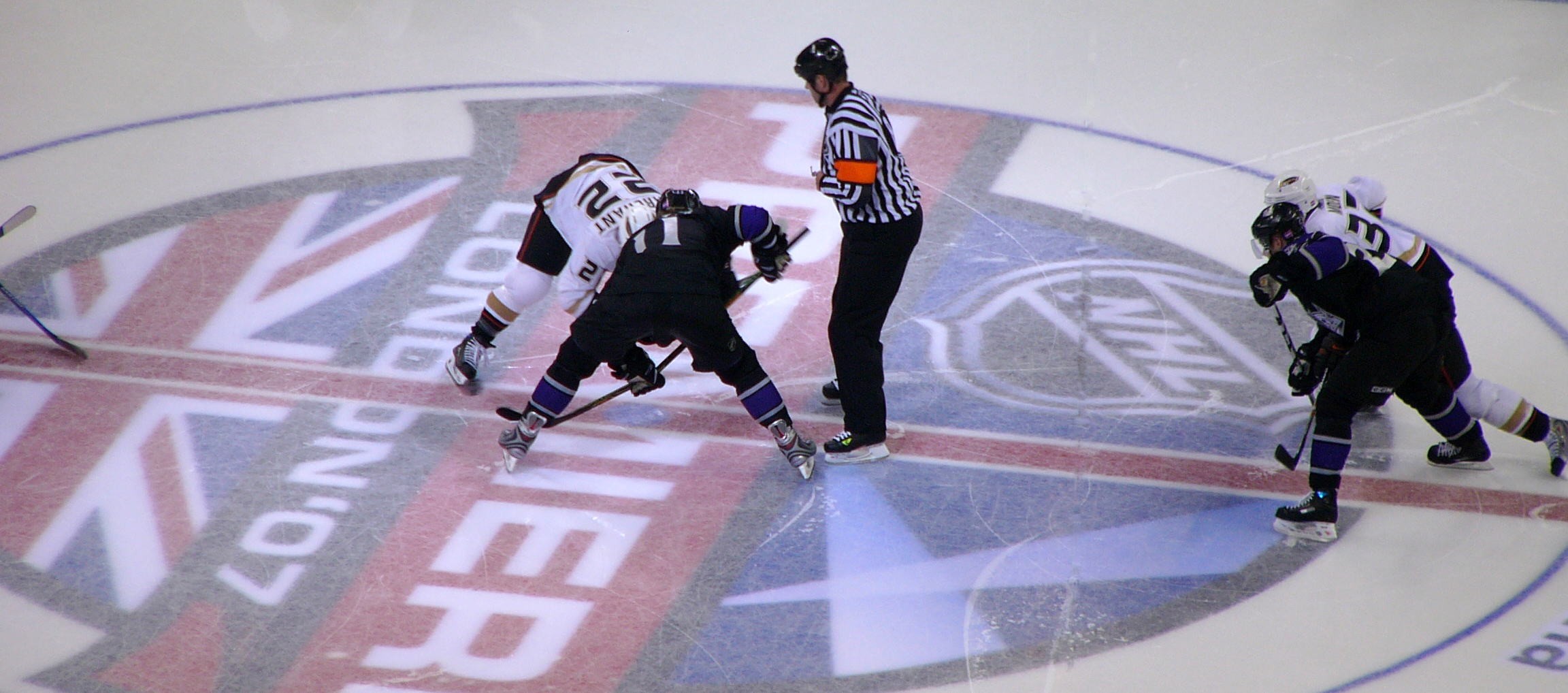
Kings' centre, Anze Kopitar, prepares to take the face off at the 2007 NHL Premiere in London.

During the 2008 NHL entry draft, the Kings had a busy day, starting with a three-way trade with the Calgary Flames and the Anaheim Ducks — the Kings traded Michael Cammalleri to the Flames and their 28th overall pick to the Ducks. In return, the Kings received the 12th overall pick, which was then later traded to the Buffalo Sabres in exchange for the 13th pick. During the draft itself, Los Angeles used their second-overall pick to select defenseman Drew Doughty, the 13th pick to select Colten Teubert and the 32nd pick to select Slava Voynov. Later on during the 2008 off-season, the Kings traded Lubomir Visnovsky to the Edmonton Oilers in exchange for Matt Greene and Jarret Stoll and, after Rob Blake left for the San Jose Sharks, the team brought back Sean O'Donnell via a trade with the Anaheim Ducks.

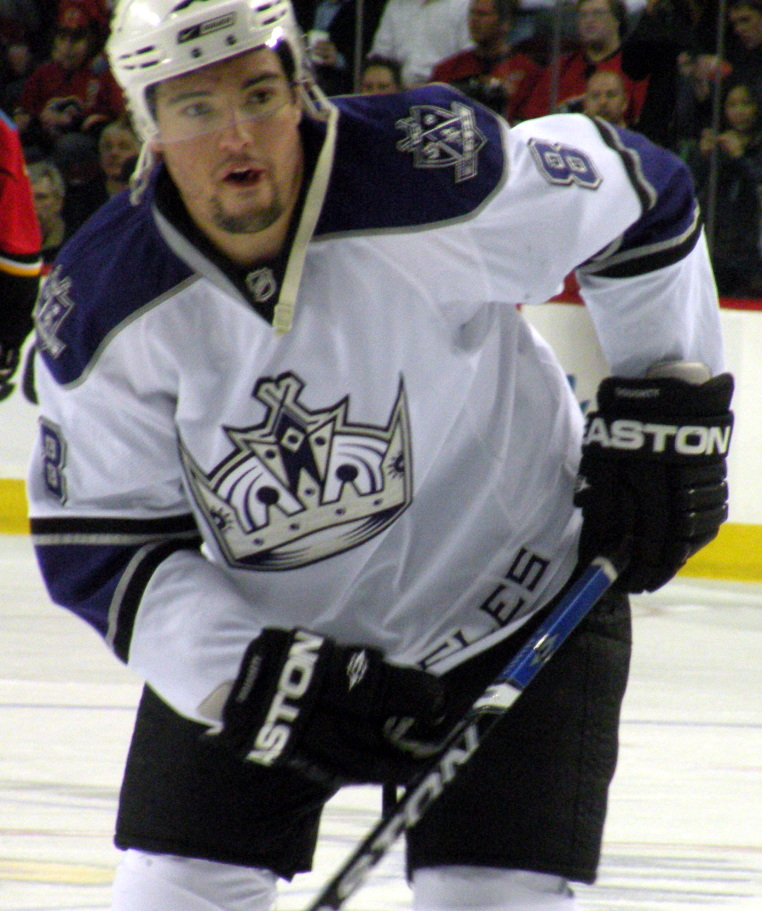
Drew Doughty during his inaugural season with the Kings, April 2009. He was drafted by the Kings 2nd overall in the 2008 draft.

On July 17, 2008, the Kings hired Terry Murray to become the 22nd head coach in franchise history. Shortly before the commencement of the 2008–09 season, on October 8, 2008, Dustin Brown was named the Kings' 15th captain in franchise history. Brown, at just 23 years of age, became both the youngest captain and the first American-born captain in Kings' history. Late into the season, in March 2009, Los Angeles acquired Justin Williams from the Carolina Hurricanes in exchange for Patrick O'Sullivan. While the 2008–09 Kings still finished last in the Pacific Division and 14th overall in the Western Conference, the 79 points they finished with was seen as an improvement, compared to their two previous seasons of 68 and 71 points, respectively.

== Return to the playoffs (2009–2014) ==
During the 2009 off-season, the Kings traded for forward Ryan Smyth, known for his prowess in front of opposing goaltenders. They also signed defenseman Rob Scuderi, who won the Stanley Cup the previous year with the Pittsburgh Penguins, and drafted Brayden Schenn in the first round, fifth overall; Kyle Clifford in the second round, 35th overall; and Jordan Nolan, the son of NHL coach Ted Nolan in the seventh round, 186th overall at the 2009 NHL entry draft.

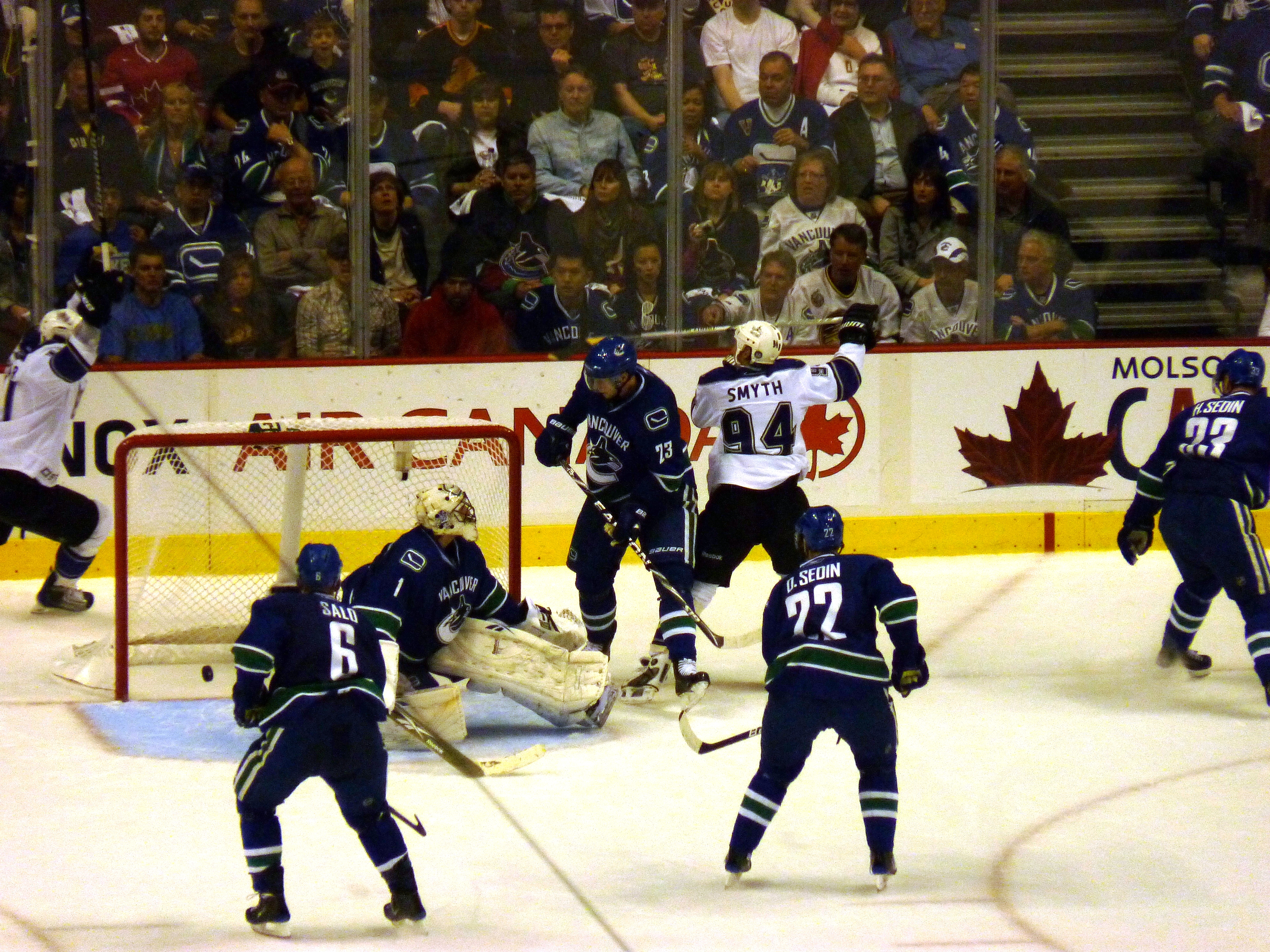
Kings score a goal against the Vancouver Canucks in the first round of the 2010 Stanley Cup playoffs.

The Kings were very successful during the 2009–10 season, finishing sixth overall in the West despite being in the midst of a rebuild. They established a franchise record with a nine-game unbeaten streak, and finished the season with 101 points, just the third 100-plus point season in franchise history. However, they lost to a highly skilled Vancouver Canucks team in six games in the Western Conference Quarterfinals. The Kings initially led the series two games to one, and were ahead 3–2 after the second period of game four only to let the game slip away in part due to excellent goaltending by Roberto Luongo and late goals by Henrik and Daniel Sedin. The Canucks would then easily win the next two games to eliminate the Kings. Despite the series loss, many considered the season to be an outright success due to the age of the team and the setbacks from injuries to key players Ryan Smyth and Justin Williams. Forward Anze Kopitar spent most of the first half of the season in the top ten in the league in scoring, ultimately finishing 20th overall in points. Drew Doughty was one of three finalists for the James Norris Memorial Trophy as the league's top defenseman and also received the King's Best Defenseman award. The season marked the first time in eight years that the Kings made it to the playoffs.

During the 2010 off-season, the Kings signed veteran and former Vancouver on-ice captain Willie Mitchell, as well as adding forward Alexei Ponikarovsky after losing out on the controversial free agent signing of Ilya Kovalchuk. Mitchell's signing created a top defensive pairing along with Norris Trophy favorite Drew Doughty and bolstered the chemistry of the locker room after the departure of veterans Sean O'Donnell and Alexander Frolov, in the trade deadline, the team acquired Dustin Penner from the Edmonton Oilers for Colten Teubert, a first-round pick in the 2011 NHL entry draft, and a conditional second-round pick in 2012.

The Kings entered the 2011 playoffs as the seventh seed in the West and played San Jose in the first round. Unfortunately, there were more setbacks as the team's high scorer, Anze Kopitar, was injured and unavailable for the playoffs. On the road, the Sharks would win game one in overtime, 3–2, whereupon the Kings responded with a 4–0 shut-out in game two. On home ice for game three, the momentum for the Kings appeared to continue as they jumped to an early 4–0 lead, only to let it slip away as the Sharks fought back and eventually won the game in overtime, 6–5. The Sharks then made easy work of the Kings in the next game, prevailing 6–3. Facing elimination, the Kings won game five 3–1 on the road, and kept the score a tie by the end of regulation in game six at home, though failing capitalize on a five-minute power-play late in the game up to overtime would prove to be the fatal blow, as moments after the Sharks' penalty finished, Joe Thornton would win the game four–3 for San Jose, thereby eliminating the Kings.

=== First Stanley Cup victory (2011–2012) ===
In the 2011 off-season, the Kings acquired Mike Richards and prospect Rob Bordson from the Philadelphia Flyers in exchange for Wayne Simmonds, Brayden Schenn and a 2012 second-round pick. By personal request, the team also traded Ryan Smyth back to the Edmonton Oilers in exchange for Colin Fraser and a seventh-round pick in 2012. The club then signed Simon Gagne from the Tampa Bay Lightning to play alongside former Philadelphia Flyer teammate Mike Richards.

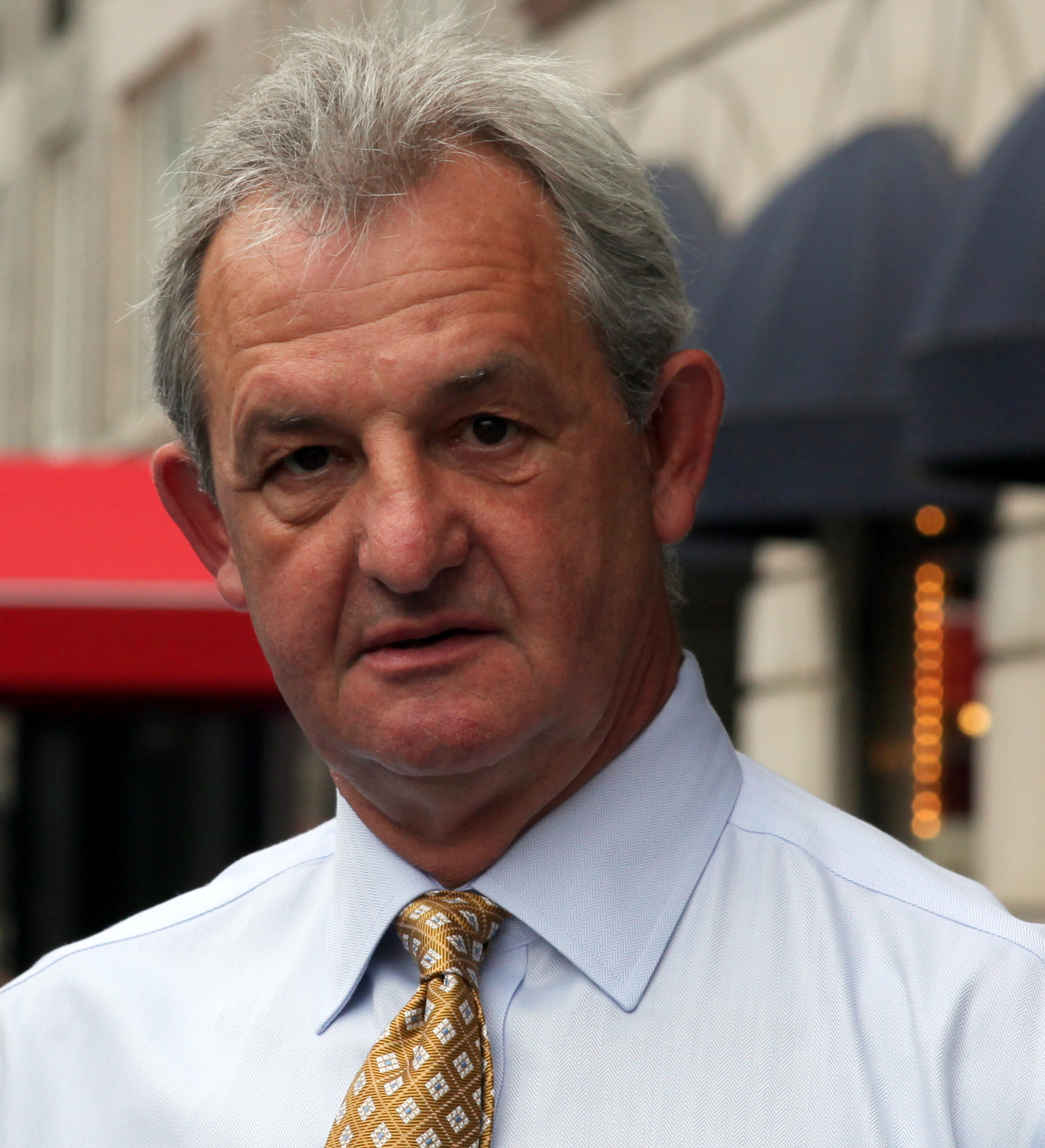
Darryl Sutter in 2014. Sutter was named as the Kings head coach in December 2011.

The Kings began the 2011–12 season with a 5–1–1 record in their first seven games, but went 8–11–3 over the next 22, resulting in a 13–12–4 overall record after the first 29 games. This resulted in coach Terry Murray being fired. He was replaced on an interim basis by John Stevens for four games before on December 17, 2011, the team hired Darryl Sutter as their new head coach. Before the trade deadline, the Kings acquired another former Philadelphia Flyer in Richards' friend and former teammate Jeff Carter from the Columbus Blue Jackets for Jack Johnson and a conditional first-round draft pick. The Kings were much improved under Sutter, going 25–13–11. They also narrowly missed clinching their second divisional title in franchise history.

The Kings lost both of their final two games to the San Jose Sharks in overtime, allowing San Jose to edge them out by one point for the seventh seed in the Western Conference, while a five-game winning streak gave the Phoenix Coyotes their first Pacific Division championship. The Kings settled for the eighth seed, having rounded out the season with a 40–27–15 record for 95 points. The Kings then headed into the 2012 playoffs against the Presidents' Trophy-winning Vancouver Canucks. After playing two games in Vancouver and one in Los Angeles, the Kings were up 3–0 in the series, a franchise first. By winning game five in Vancouver, the Kings advanced to the Conference Semifinals for the first time since the 2000–01 season, whereupon they swept the second-seeded St. Louis Blues, advancing to the Western Conference Finals for only the second time in franchise history. In doing so, the Kings also became the first NHL team to enter the playoffs as the eighth seed and eliminate the first- and second-seeded teams in the Conference. They then defeated Phoenix in five games to reach the Final, culminating in an overtime goal by Dustin Penner in game five, and thus becoming the second team in NHL history to beat the top three Conference seeds in the playoffs (the Calgary Flames achieved the same feat in 2004, ironically also under Darryl Sutter) and the first eighth seed to accomplish the feat.

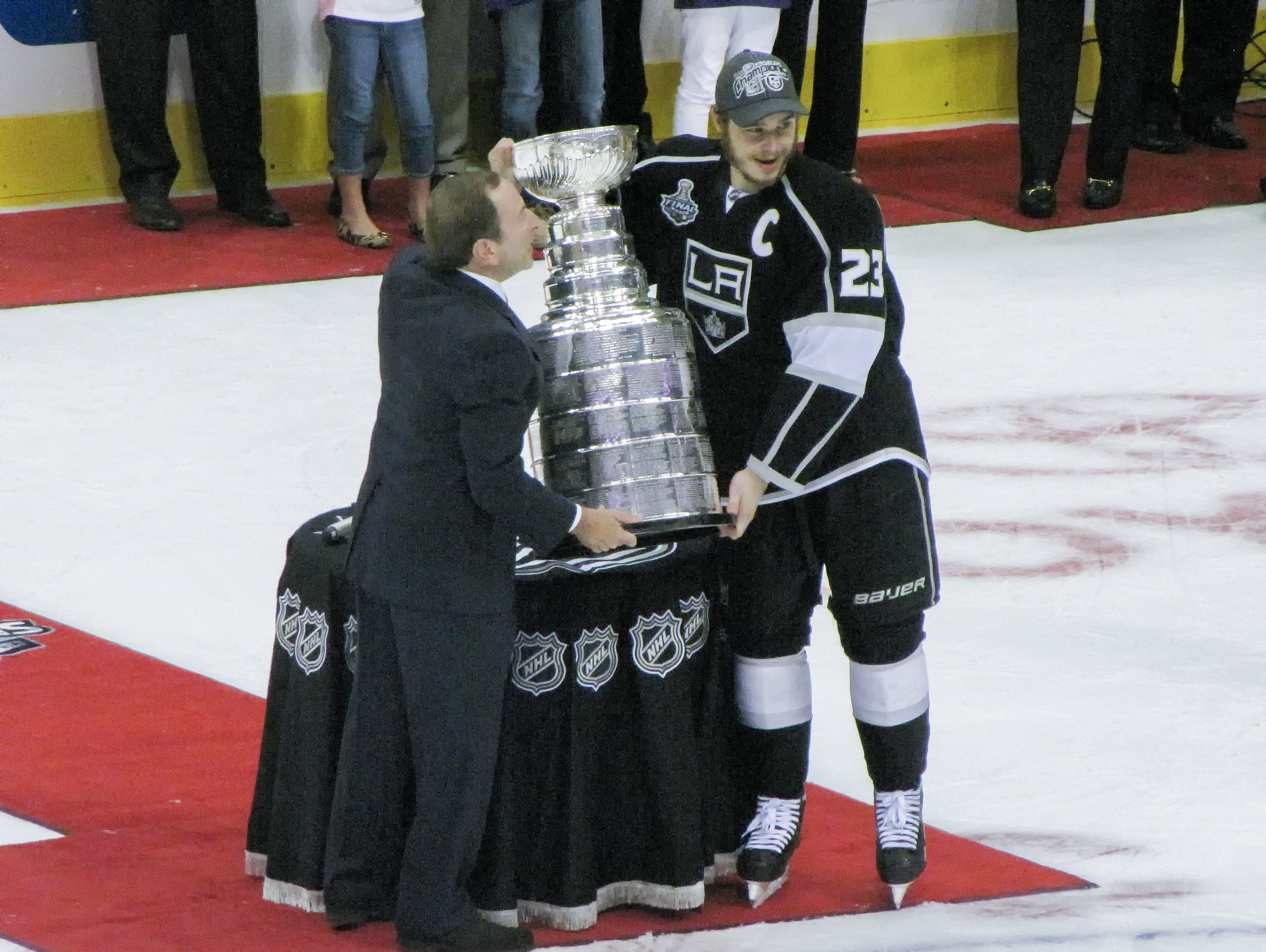
Kings' captain Dustin Brown receiving the Stanley Cup from NHL commissioner Gary Bettman after the Kings won the 2012 Stanley Cup.

Los Angeles faced the New Jersey Devils in the Final, defeating them in six games to win their first Stanley Cup in franchise history. With the game six victory happened on home ice at Crypto.com Arena, the Kings became the first team since the 2007 Anaheim Ducks to win the Stanley Cup at home, as well as the second Californian NHL team to do so. The Kings were also the first eight seed champion in any of the North American major leagues, the first Stanley Cup champion that finished below fifth in its conference, and the third to finish below second in its division (after the 1993 Canadiens and the 1995 Devils). Goaltender Jonathan Quick was awarded the Conn Smythe Trophy as the most valuable player during the playoffs, and soon after signed a ten-year contract extension on June 28.

=== Defending champions (2012–2013) ===
Due to the 2012–13 NHL lockout, the 2012–13 Los Angeles Kings season began on January 19, 2013, and was shortened to 48 games. Due to the shortened season, teams only played teams within their own conference. Before the season began, the team traded Kevin Westgarth to the Carolina Hurricanes in exchange for Anthony Stewart. They lost their home opener to the Chicago Blackhawks and lost the next two games, only securing a single point in overtime against the Edmonton Oilers. Their first victory came against their Pacific Division rival Phoenix Coyotes.

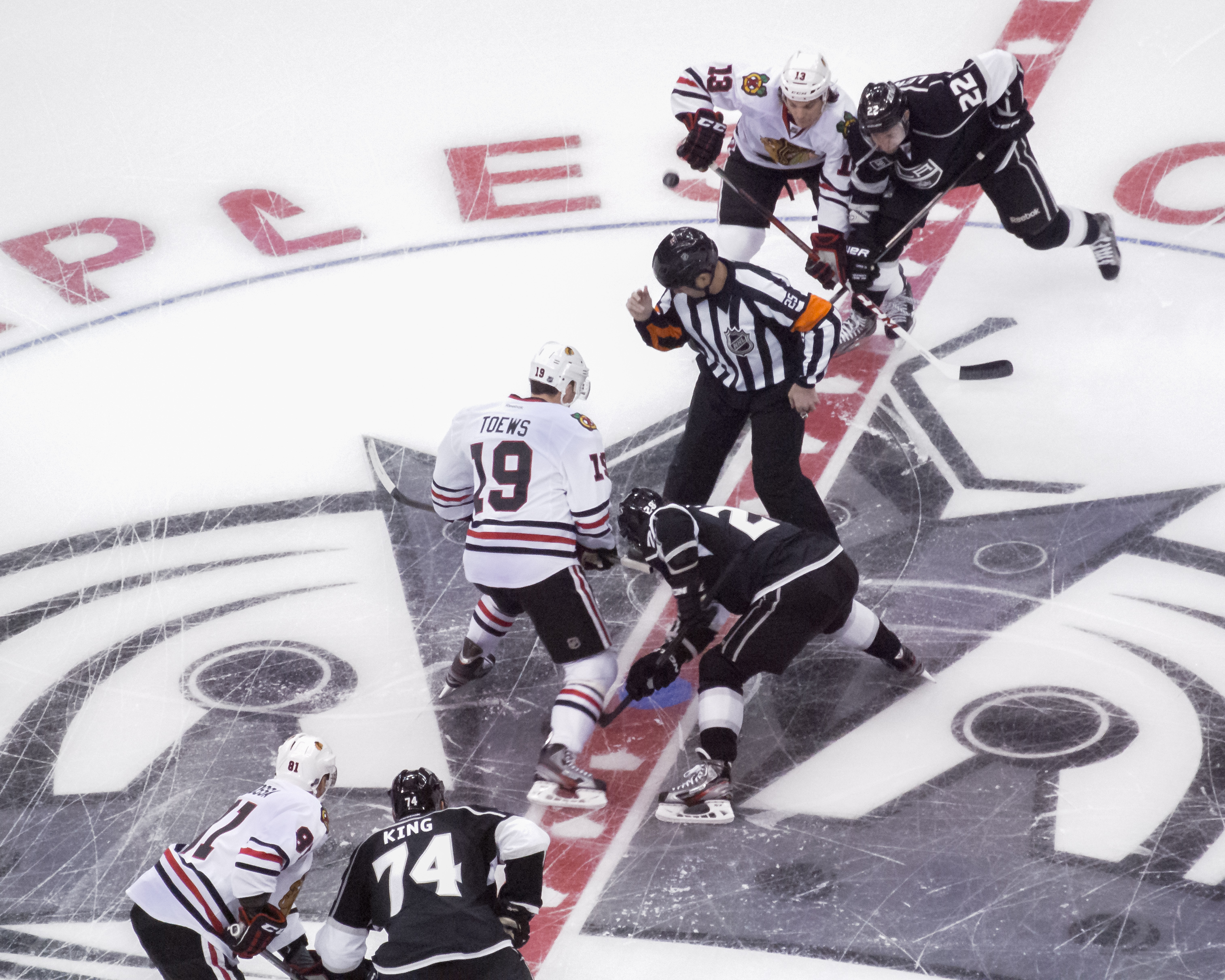
The Kings face off against the Chicago Blackhawks in their first game of the 2012–13 season. The season was delayed until January due to the NHL lockout.

With Willie Mitchell out for the season and Matt Greene injured after the season opener, the Kings made some moves to improve their defense and acquire draft picks. They traded Andrei Loktionov to New Jersey for a 2013 draft pick and traded Simon Gagne to the Philadelphia Flyers for a conditional 2013 fourth-round pick. Additionally, Davis Drewiske was traded to the Montreal Canadiens in exchange for a 2013 fifth-round pick, then acquiring Keaton Ellerby from the Florida Panthers for a fifth-round pick in 2013 and acquiring Robyn Regehr from the Buffalo Sabres. Regehr would later sign a two-year contract extension with the Kings during the playoffs.

The Kings finished the season as the fifth seed in the West and began the defense of the Cup on the road against the St. Louis Blues, who they swept in the 2012 playoffs. After losing the first two games, the Kings won four consecutive games to eliminate the Blues in six games. In the second round, they then played a very tough San Jose Sharks team, this time with home ice advantage. In the first game, Jarret Stoll suffered an injury from the Sharks' Raffi Torres, who ended up being suspended for the rest of the series. The Kings eventually won in seven games. In the Western Conference Finals, they faced the number one seed in the West and Presidents' Trophy winner, the Chicago Blackhawks. After dropping the first two games, the Kings won game three with Jeff Carter suffering an injury from Blackhawks defenseman Duncan Keith, who was suspended for game four as a result. After losing game four, the Kings battled the Blackhawks through two overtime periods in game five, with Patrick Kane eventually scoring the game-winning goal that won the game and the series, sending the Blackhawks to the 2013 Stanley Cup Final and ending the Kings' season.

=== Second Stanley Cup victory (2013–2014) ===
During the 2013–14 season, the Kings acquired another Blue Jackets goal scorer in Marian Gaborik, and qualified for their fifth-straight playoffs. The season also had the Kings hosting the first NHL outdoor game in a warm weather city, receiving the Anaheim Ducks at Dodger Stadium as part of the 2014 NHL Stadium Series.

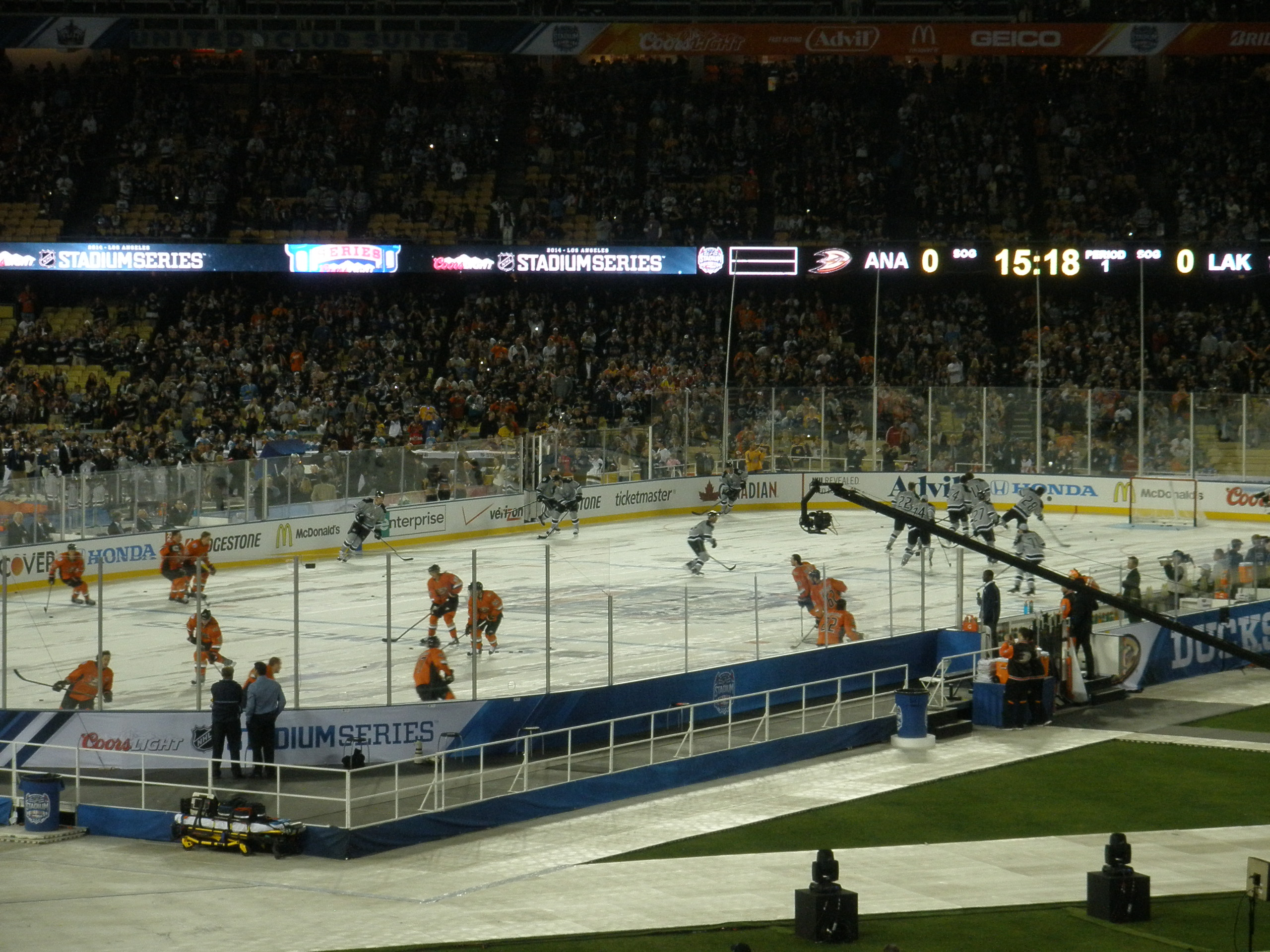
The Kings hosted the Anaheim Ducks at Dodger Stadium as a part of the 2014 NHL Stadium Series.

In the first round of the 2014 playoffs, the Kings played their in-state rivals, the San Jose Sharks. After losing the first three games to the Sharks, the Kings became the fourth team in NHL history to win the final four consecutive games after initially being down three games to none, beating the Sharks in San Jose in the deciding game seven. In the second round, the Kings played another in-state rival, Anaheim. After starting the series with two wins, the Kings lost three-straight games, trailing the series three games to two. For the second time in the first two rounds of the playoffs, however, the Kings were able to rally back after being down in the series and defeated the Ducks in Anaheim in game seven.

In the third round, the Kings jumped out to a three games to one lead against Stanley Cup-defending Chicago, but were unable to close out the series in the fifth and sixth games. On June 1, 2014, the Kings advanced to the Stanley Cup Final for the second time in three years after winning game seven 5–4 in overtime via a goal from Alec Martinez, clinching their third Western Conference title in franchise history. The Kings became the first team in NHL history to win three game sevens en route to a Stanley Cup Final berth. Not only were the Kings the first team in history to accomplish this feat, they also managed to win all game sevens on opposing ice. In the Final, the Kings faced the Eastern Conference-winning New York Rangers, who had defeated the Montreal Canadiens in six games in the Eastern Finals.

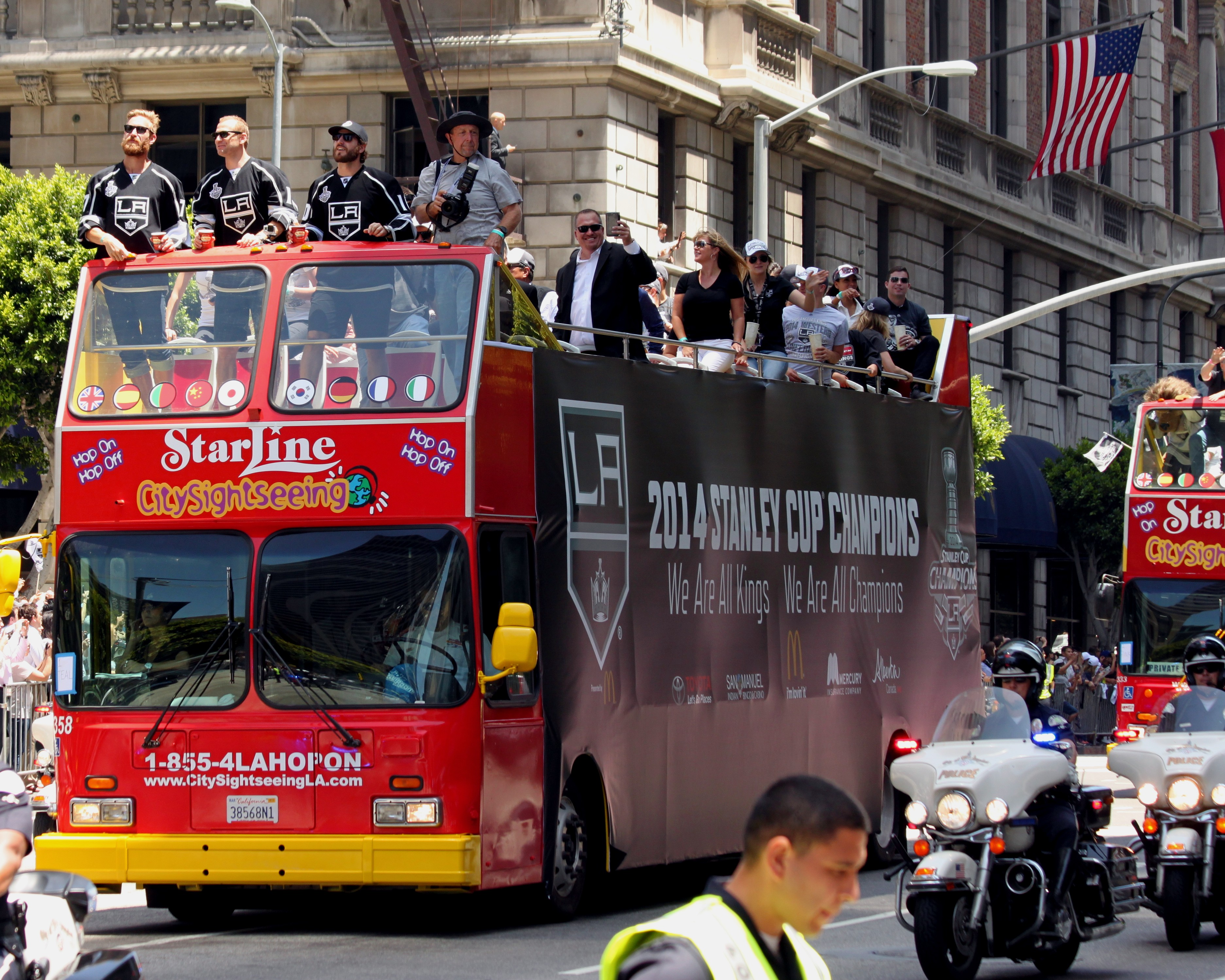
Parade held for the 2014 Kings team, shortly after they won their second Second Cup, June 2014.

The Kings won the Stanley Cup in five games, culminating with an Alec Martinez goal in the second overtime of game five at Staples Center. The championship run had a record 26 playoff games, with the Kings facing elimination a record seven times. With their game seven victory in the Conference Finals and wins in the first two games of the Cup Finals, they became the first team to win three consecutive playoff games after trailing by more than one goal in each game. Justin Williams, who scored twice in the Finals and had points in all three game sevens throughout the playoffs, won the Conn Smythe Trophy as playoff MVP.

== Playoff struggles and return to contention (2014–present) ==
Having won two Stanley Cup championships in the last three years, the Kings entered the 2014–15 season as the early favorites to retain their title. However, the Kings struggled often, with scoring slumps, defensemen losing games to injury and suspensions and frequent road losses. A defeat to the Calgary Flames in the penultimate game of the season eliminated the Kings from playoff contention, while qualifying Calgary, which coincidentally missed the postseason during the Kings' five-season playoff streak. Despite finishing with a record of 40–27–15, the Kings became the first defending Stanley Cup champion to miss the postseason since the 2006–07 Carolina Hurricanes and only the fourth overall since the 1967 NHL expansion season.

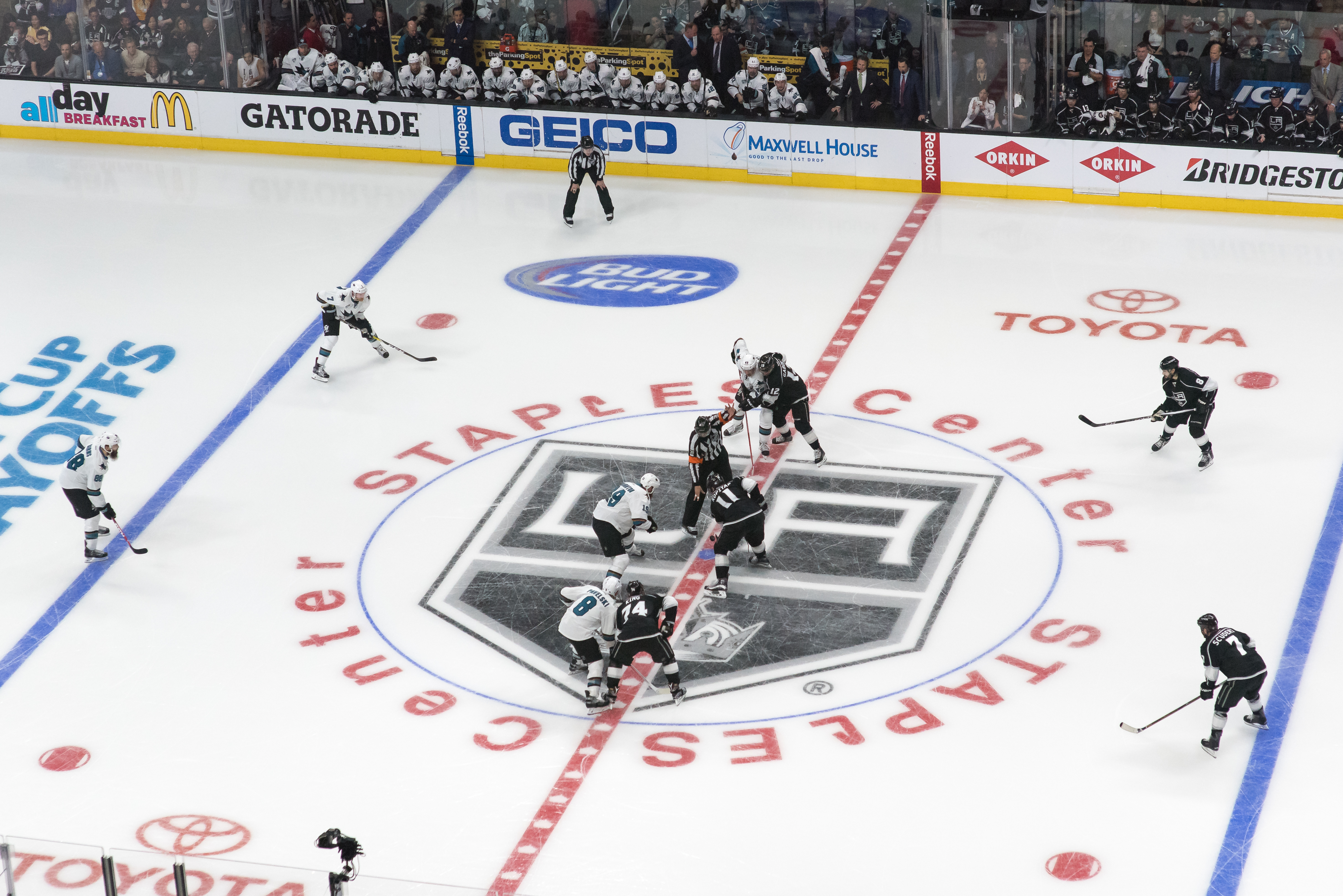
A face-off between the Kings and the San Jose Sharks, during game five of the first round in the 2016 Stanley Cup playoffs.

At the start of the 2015–16 season, the Kings were expected to make the playoffs. They entered the playoffs as the fifth seed in their conference and second seed in their division. They faced the San Jose Sharks, but lost to them in five games. On June 16, 2016, the Kings named Anze Kopitar the 14th captain in team history, replacing Dustin Brown, who had led the team for the past eight seasons.

The Kings celebrated their 50th anniversary during the 2016–17 season along with the other still active 1967 expansion teams (the St. Louis Blues, Philadelphia Flyers, and Pittsburgh Penguins), and for the first time since 2002, they hosted the NHL All-Star Game; Jeff Carter and Drew Doughty would represent the Kings at the All-Star Game, with the former leading the team in scoring this season. Goaltender Jonathan Quick suffered an injury on opening night that sidelined him for most of the season, and the Kings struggled without him. Backup Peter Budaj filled the void, earning his first starting duties since his time with the Colorado Avalanche six years earlier, but near the trade deadline, the Kings traded him to Tampa Bay for another goalie, Ben Bishop who shared the crease with Jonathan Quick down the stretch, the superstar having returned from his injury. Despite the trade, the Kings ultimately missed the playoffs for the second time in three seasons and, in the offseason, fired general manager Dean Lombardi and head coach Darryl Sutter. Assistant general manager Rob Blake was promoted to be the new general manager and John Stevens took over as head coach after serving as associate head coach for the Kings for several seasons. In the 2017 NHL expansion draft, the Vegas Golden Knights drafted defenseman Brayden McNabb, who had been left unprotected by the Kings. In the next season, the Kings clinched the 2018 playoffs as a wild card, but were swept by the expansion Golden Knights. Kopitar led the team in scoring that season, scoring a career high 35 goals whilst leading the team in scoring again.

On November 4, 2018, the Kings fired Stevens as head coach after the team started the 2018–19 season 4–8–1, and replaced him with Willie Desjardins. In Desjardins' debut on November 7, the Kings defeated the Ducks 4–1. The Kings finished the 2018–19 season in last place in both the Pacific Division and Western Conference with 71 points and they missed the playoffs for the third time in five seasons.

The Kings hired Todd McLellan as their next head coach on April 16, 2019. The 2019–20 season was highlighted by several rebuilding moves, as players such as Trevor Lewis, Jack Campbell, Kyle Clifford, Derek Forbort and Alec Martinez would all depart the team, through trades or (in Lewis' case) via free agency. The team notably won the 2020 NHL Stadium Series in a 3–1 win over the Colorado Avalanche, which saw Tyler Toffoli score the league's first hat trick in an outdoor regular-season game; Toffoli was traded to the Vancouver Canucks two days after the feat. In their later portion of the season, the Kings called up several prospects including Mikey Anderson, Gabe Vilardi and Cal Petersen, as the team went on a 7-game win streak, showcasing their deep and talented prospect pool. This win streak, however, would mark the end of their season; the NHL would pause its season due to the COVID-19 pandemic, and as part of their plan to return to play, the regular season was officially ended, and the Kings were one of seven teams left out of the playoffs. They were automatically entered into the first phase of the 2020 NHL draft lottery, in which the Kings received the second overall pick.

In the 2020–21 season, the Kings had another rebuilding year as they traded Jeff Carter, extended Alex Iafallo, and saw debuts of prospects like Jaret Anderson-Dolan, Arthur Kaliyev, Tobias Bjornfot, Rasmus Kupari and Quinton Byfield. A bright spot saw Anze Kopitar score his 1,000th point near season's end. They finished sixth in the Honda West division and missed the playoffs again. During the 2021 NHL expansion draft, the Seattle Kraken selected Kurtis MacDermid from the Kings, who was left unprotected (he would later be traded to the Colorado Avalanche).

In the lead up to the 2021–22 season, the Kings acquired forwards Phillip Danault and Viktor Arvidsson during the offseason. They also signed defenseman Alexander Edler in an effort to bolster their blue line presence. The Kings qualified for the playoffs for the first time in 4 seasons, despite losing Drew Doughty to injury. This season would also prove to be Dustin Brown's last, as the forward announced on April 28, 2022, he would retire following the 2022 playoffs. They were defeated by the Edmonton Oilers in seven games in the First Round.

During the off-season, the Kings acquired Kevin Fiala from the Minnesota Wild, to replace Brown on the first line. The 2022–23 season would start off well, as Fiala would lead the team in points for much of the season and be elected to the 2023 All-Star Game. Clinching the 2023 playoffs, the Kings once again faced the Edmonton Oilers in the First Round, and the Kings were defeated, this time in six games.
