= List of Los Angeles Kings head coaches =

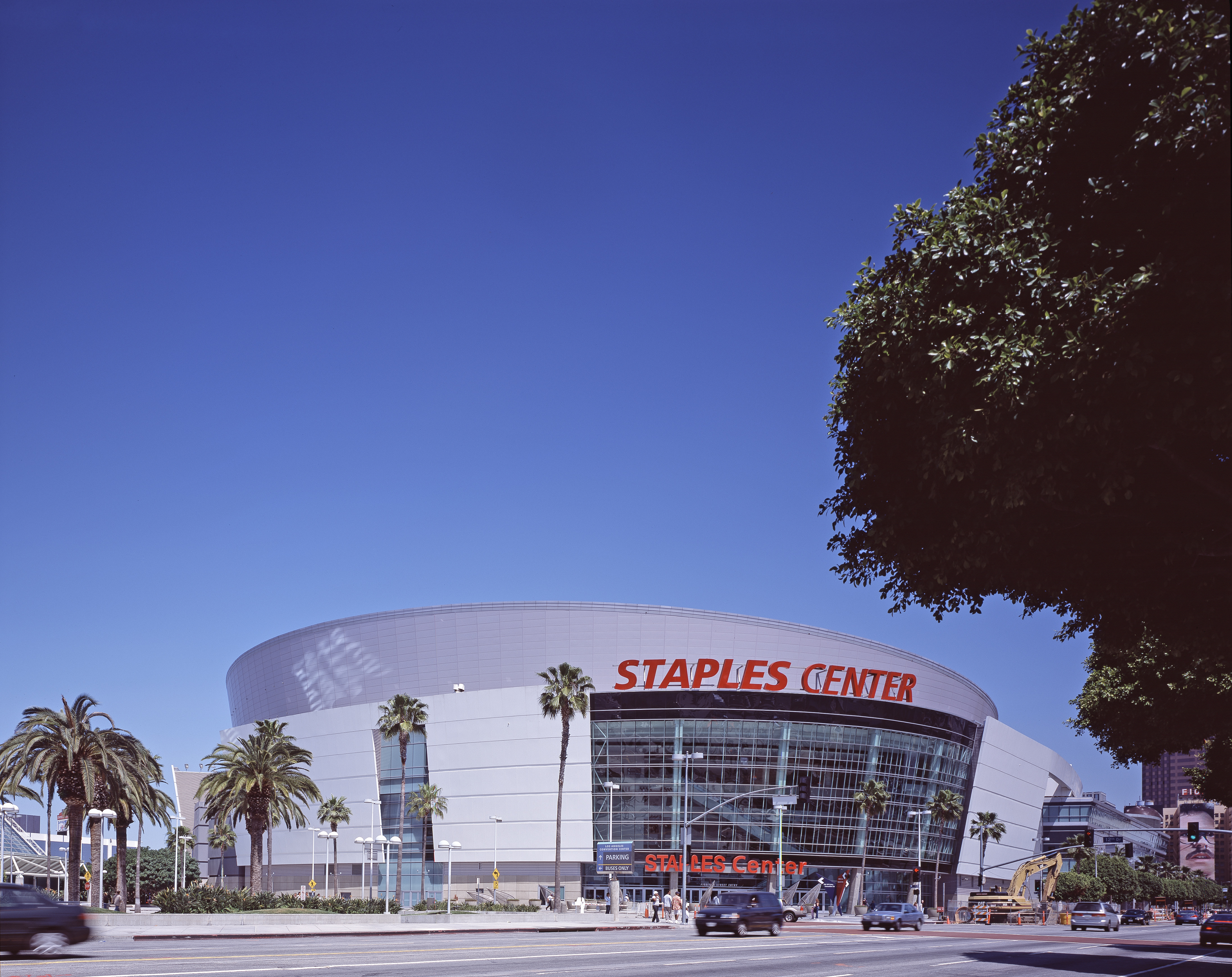
The Kings have played their home games at the Staples Center since 1999.

The Los Angeles Kings are an American professional ice hockey team based in Los Angeles. They play in the Pacific Division of the Western Conference in the National Hockey League (NHL). The team joined the NHL in 1967 as an expansion team with five other teams, and won their first Stanley Cup in 2012. Having first played at The Forum, the Kings have played their home games at the Crypto.com Arena since 1999. The Kings are owned by Philip Anschutz and Edward P. Roski, Ken Holland is their general manager, Peter Laviolette is their head coach, and Anze Kopitar was the most recent team captain.

There have been 32 head coaches for the Kings. The franchise's first head coach was Red Kelly, who coached for two seasons. Andy Murray is the franchise's all-time leader for the most regular-season games coached (480), the most regular-season game wins (215), and the most regular-season points (519); Darryl Sutter is the franchise's all-time leader for the most playoff games coached (64) and playoff game wins (41), and the highest playoff winning percentage (.641), which is one of only two over .500 out of the Kings' head coaches. Rogatien Vachon, who coached the Kings for three non-consecutive stints, is the Kings' all-time leader for the least regular-season games coached, with 10. Sutter is the only coach to have won a Stanley Cup with the Kings, in 2012 and 2014. Bob Pulford is the only head coach to have been awarded the Jack Adams Award with the Kings, having won it in the 1974–75 season. Larry Regan and Don Perry have spent their entire NHL head coaching careers with the Kings. Roger Neilson, who coached the Kings for 28 games, is the only Kings head coach to have been elected to the Hockey Hall of Fame as a builder.

== Key ==
#	Number of coaches (Note: A running total of the number of coaches of the Kings. Thus, any coach who has two or more separate terms as head coach is only counted once.)
GC	Games coached
W	Wins = 2 points
L	Losses = 0 points
T	Ties = 1 point
OT	Overtime/shootout losses = 1 point (Note: Before the 2005–06 season, the NHL instituted a penalty shootout for regular season games that remained tied after a five-minute overtime period, which prevented ties.)
PTS	Points
Win%	Winning percentage
*	Spent entire NHL coaching career with the Kings
†	Elected to the Hockey Hall of Fame as a builder

== Coaches ==
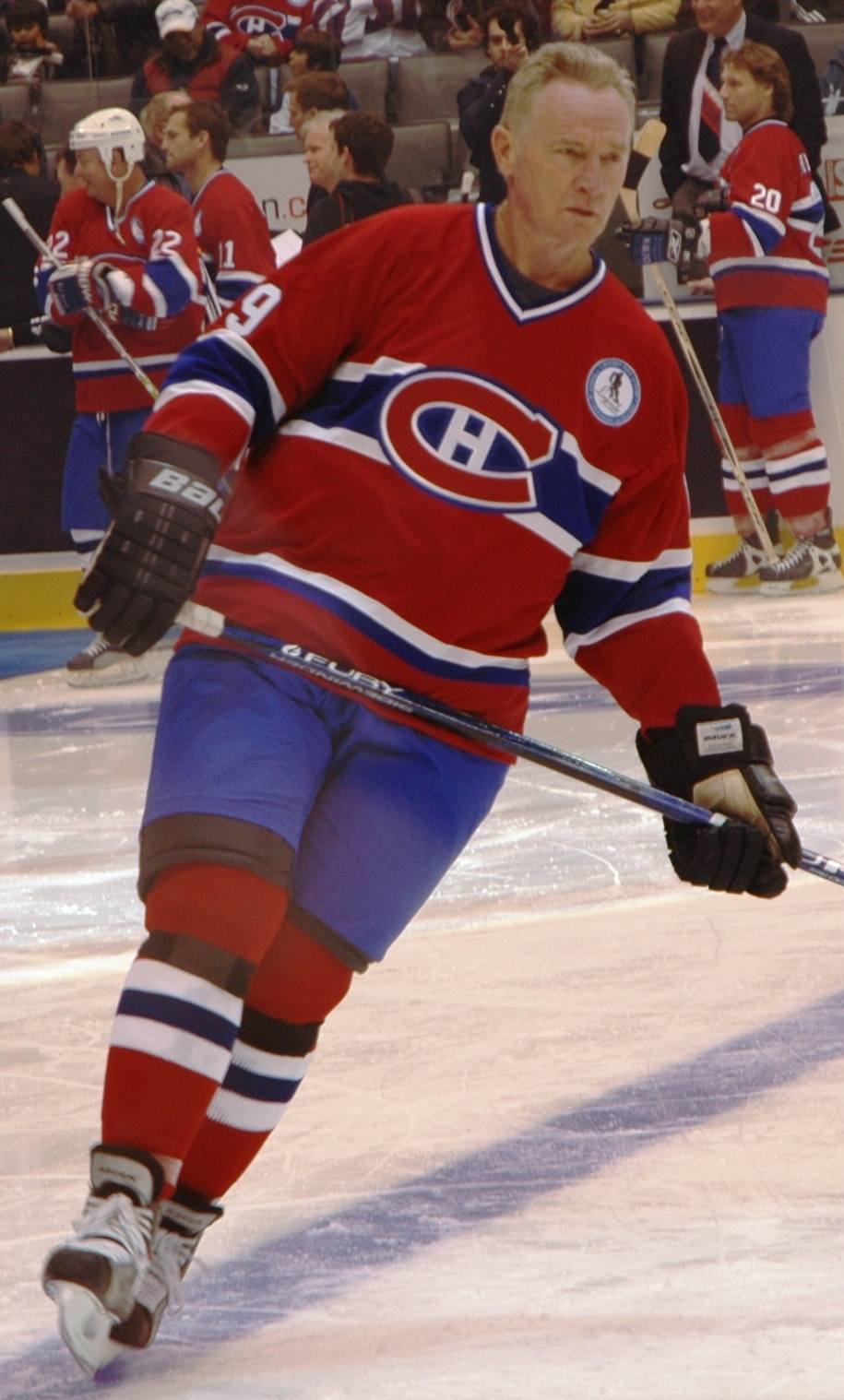
Larry Robinson (shown wearing a Montreal Canadiens jersey) coached the Kings for four seasons.

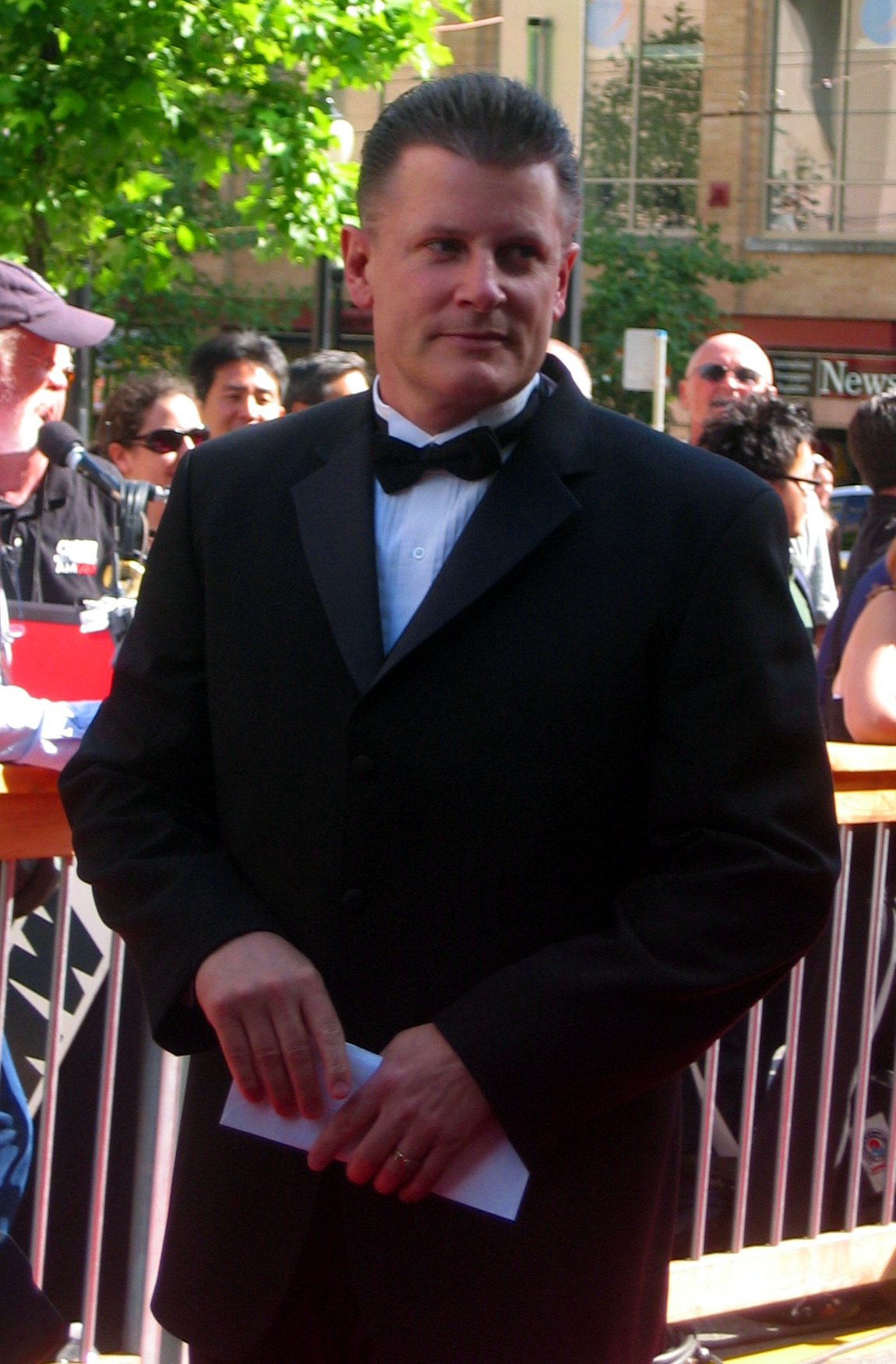
Marc Crawford was the head coach of the Kings from 2006 to 2008.

Note: Statistics are correct through the 2025–26 season.

#	Name	Term (Note: Each year is linked to an article about that particular NHL season.)	Regular season						Playoffs				Achievements	Reference
#	Name	Term	GC	W	L	T/OT	PTS	Win%	GC	W	L	Win%	Achievements	Reference
1	Red Kelly	1967–1969	150	55	75	20	130	.433	18	7	11	.389		
2	Hal Laycoe	1969	24	5	18	1	11	.229	—	—	—	—		
3	Johnny Wilson	1969–1970	52	9	34	9	27	.260	—	—	—	—		
4	Larry Regan*	1970–1971	88	27	47	14	68	.386	—	—	—	—		
5	Fred Glover	1971–1972	68	18	42	8	44	.324	—	—	—	—		
6	Bob Pulford*	1972–1977	396	178	150	68	424	.535	26	11	15	.423	1974–75 Jack Adams Award winner	
7	Ron Stewart	1977–1978	80	31	34	15	77	.481	2	0	2	.000		
8	Bob Berry	1978–1981	240	107	94	39	253	.527	10	2	8	.200		
9	Parker MacDonald	1981–1982	42	13	24	5	31	.369	—	—	—	—		
10	Don Perry*	1982–1984	168	52	85	31	135	.402	10	4	6	.400		
11	Rogatien Vachon	1984	2	1	0	1	3	.750	—	—	—	—		
12	Roger Neilson†	1984	28	8	17	3	19	.339	—	—	—	—		
13	Pat Quinn	1984–1987	202	75	101	26	176	.436	3	0	3	.000		
14	Mike Murphy	1987–1987	65	20	37	8	48	.369	5	1	4	.200		
15	Rogatien Vachon	1987	1	0	1	0	0	.000	—	—	—	—		
16	Robbie Ftorek	1987–1989	132	65	56	11	141	.534	16	5	11	.313		
17	Tom Webster	1989–1992	240	115	94	31	261	.544	28	12	16	.429		
18	Barry Melrose	1992–1995	209	79	101	29	187	.447	24	13	11	.542		
19	Rogatien Vachon	1995	7	3	2	2	8	.571	—	—	—	—		
20	Larry Robinson	1995–1999	328	122	161	45	289	.441	4	0	4	.000		
21	Andy Murray	1999–2006	480	215	176	89	519	.541	24	10	14	.417		
22	John Torchetti	2006	12	5	7	10	0	.417	—	—	—	—		
23	Marc Crawford	2006–2008	164	59	84	21	139	.424	—	—	—	—		
24	Terry Murray	2008–2011	275	139	106	30	308	.560	12	4	8	.333		
25	John Stevens	2011	4	2	2	0	4	.500	—	—	—	—		
26	Darryl Sutter	2011–2017	425	225	147	45	417	.592	64	42	27	.641	2012, 2014 Stanley Cup	
27	John Stevens	2017–2018	95	49	37	9	107	.563	4	0	4	.000		
28	Willie Desjardins	2018–2019	69	27	34	8	62	.449	—	—	—	—		
29	Todd McLellan	2019–2024	338	164	130	44	372	.550	13	5	8	38.46		
30	Jim Hiller	2024–2026	175	93	58	24	210	.600	11	3	8	.273		
31	D. J. Smith	2026	23	11	6	6	28	.609	4	0	4	.000		
32	Peter Laviolette	2026–present	—	—	—	—	—	–	—	—	—	–		
