= Parker MacDonald =

Canadian ice hockey player (1933–2017)

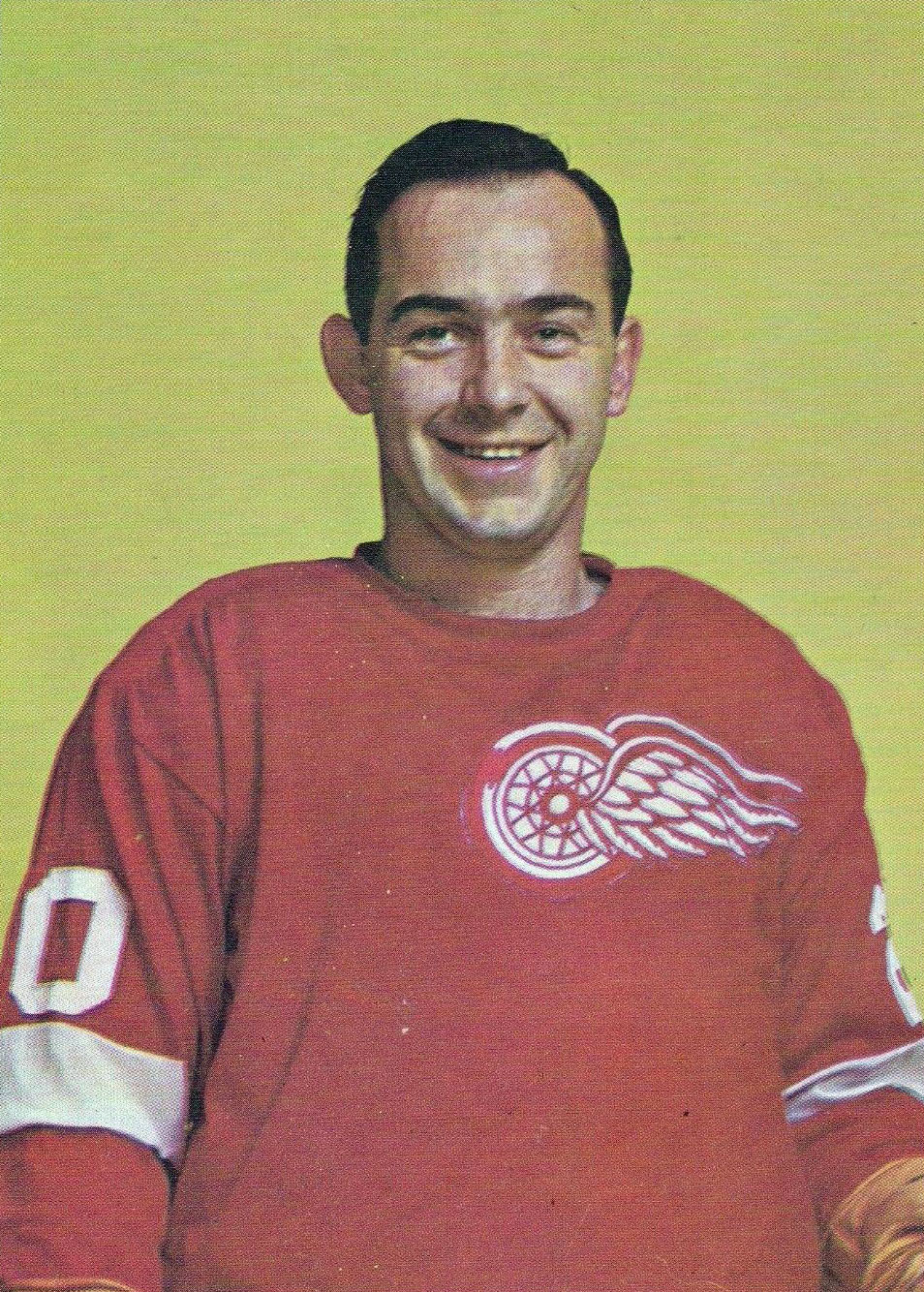
- Born: June 14, 1933 Sydney, Nova Scotia, Canada
- Died: August 17, 2017 (aged 84) Northford, Connecticut, U.S.
- Height: 5 ft 11 in (180 cm)
- Weight: 160 lb (73 kg; 11 st 6 lb)
- Position: Centre
- Shot: Left
- Played for: Toronto Maple Leafs; New York Rangers; Detroit Red Wings; Boston Bruins; Minnesota North Stars
- Playing career: 1952–1969

Calvin Parker MacDonald (June 14, 1933 — August 17, 2017) was a Canadian professional ice hockey left winger who played for five National Hockey League teams between 1953 and 1969. He later coached the Minnesota North Stars and the Los Angeles Kings.

== Playing career ==
MacDonald played in the Ontario Hockey Association for the Toronto Marlboros in the 1951–52 season and starting turning heads. He was a natural goal-scorer but the management felt he needed time to blossom. He made his NHL debut in 1952, playing one game for the Toronto Maple Leafs. The management liked what they saw and promoted MacDonald to the AHL the following season. There MacDonald played for the Pittsburgh Hornets until he finally earned full-time status with the Leafs in 1954. After that season the New York Rangers plucked MacDonald from the Leafs' roster in the Intra-League Draft, where he continued to be shuffled between the Rangers and their AHL affiliates. When New York finally gave up on MacDonald, he sought out a doctor to examine his chronically sore shoulder and was surprised to find that a chunk of metal was still embedded in it, the result of a broken drill left in him from a previous operation.

Following this news, the Detroit Red Wings decided to take a chance and grabbed MacDonald in the 1960 Intra-League Draft. That season he found his stride and reached his full potential playing centre on a line with Gordie Howe and Alex Delvecchio of the famed "Production line". He had a career year in the 1962–63 season when he scored 33 goals with eight of those being game winning goals. MacDonald would remain with the Wings until May 31, 1965 when he was traded to the Boston Bruins along with Albert Langlois, Ron Harris and Bob Dillabough for Ab McDonald, Bob McCord and Ken Stephanson, only to be traded back for Pit Martin after just half a season.

During the 1967 Expansion Draft, MacDonald was chosen by the Minnesota North Stars 18th overall. He would contribute 62 points, including 9 in the playoffs to the Stars in two seasons. He retired in 1969, with 323 career NHL points in 676 games played.

== Coaching ==
Following his retirement, MacDonald became a player-coach for the Iowa Stars of the Central Hockey League and led them to a 35–26–11 record, losing in the finals. He moved on to coaching full-time with the New Haven Nighthawks for a year and then returned to his former team in the NHL, Minnesota, as head coach. He performed well with the North Stars but decided to return to coaching the Nighthawks, as the pressure was too great. He would coach the Nighthawks for the next five seasons, always with a winning record but always losing in the playoffs, including losing in the finals twice. He even received the Louis A.R. Pieri Memorial Award for the AHL's best coach after the 1978–79 season. He decided to give the NHL one more shot as he accepted an assistant coaching position for the Los Angeles Kings in 1980 followed by the head coach position in the 1981–82 season. MacDonald retired midway through the season with a record of 13–24–5.

== Career statistics ==
=== Regular season and playoffs ===
			Regular season					Playoffs
Season	Team	League	GP	G	A	Pts	PIM	GP	G	A	Pts	PIM
1949–50	Sydney Millionaires	CBSHL	1	1	0	1	0	1	1	0	1	0
1950–51	Toronto Marlboros	OHA	51	31	22	53	50	13	9	5	14	6
1951–52	Toronto Marlboros	OHA	52	39	51	90	58	6	2	3	5	4
1952–53	Toronto Marlboros	OHA	55	39	20	59	48	7	3	2	5	4
1952–53	Toronto Maple Leafs	NHL	1	0	0	0	0	—	—	—	—	—
1952–53	Pittsburgh Hornets	AHL	—	—	—	—	—	1	0	0	0	0
1953–54	Pittsburgh Hornets	AHL	70	29	24	53	22	5	0	2	2	0
1954–55	Toronto Maple Leafs	NHL	62	8	3	11	36	4	0	0	0	4
1954–55	Pittsburgh Hornets	AHL	8	3	4	7	2	—	—	—	—	—
1955–56	Pittsburgh Hornets	AHL	58	35	32	67	60	3	0	3	3	2
1956–57	New York Rangers	NHL	45	7	8	15	24	1	1	1	2	0
1956–57	Providence Reds	AHL	2	4	1	5	0	—	—	—	—	—
1957–58	New York Rangers	NHL	70	8	10	18	30	6	1	2	3	2
1958–59	Buffalo Bisons	AHL	67	17	21	38	58	11	2	7	9	8
1959–60	New York Rangers	NHL	4	0	0	0	0	—	—	—	—	—
1959–60	Springfield Indians	AHL	65	37	36	73	16	10	3	7	10	4
1960–61	Detroit Red Wings	NHL	70	14	12	26	6	9	1	0	1	0
1961–62	Detroit Red Wings	NHL	32	5	7	12	8	—	—	—	—	—
1961–62	Hershey Bears	AHL	20	10	4	14	8	—	—	—	—	—
1962–63	Detroit Red Wings	NHL	69	33	28	61	32	11	3	2	5	2
1963–64	Detroit Red Wings	NHL	68	21	25	46	25	14	3	3	6	2
1964–65	Detroit Red Wings	NHL	69	13	33	46	38	7	1	1	2	6
1965–66	Boston Bruins	NHL	29	6	4	10	6	—	—	—	—	—
1965–66	Detroit Red Wings	NHL	37	5	12	17	24	9	0	0	0	2
1966–67	Detroit Red Wings	NHL	16	3	5	8	2	—	—	—	—	—
1966–67	Pittsburgh Hornets	AHL	59	16	30	46	18	9	1	3	4	4
1967–68	Minnesota North Stars	NHL	69	19	23	42	22	14	4	5	9	2
1967–68	Memphis South Stars	CHL	5	2	3	5	2	—	—	—	—	—
1968–69	Minnesota North Stars	NHL	35	2	9	11	0	—	—	—	—	—
1968–69	Memphis South Stars	CHL	28	6	11	17	0	—	—	—	—	—
1969–70	Iowa Stars	CHL	—	—	—	—	—	—	—	—	—	—
NHL totals			676	144	179	323	253	75	14	14	28	20

=== Coaching record ===
			Regular season					Playoffs
Season	Team	League	GC	W	L	T	Finish	GC	W	L	Result
1969–70	Iowa Stars	CHL	72	35	26	11	2nd, CHL	11	5	6	Lost in final
1970–71	Cleveland Barons	AHL	—	—	—	—	—	—	—	—	—
1972–73	New Haven Nighthawks	AHL	76	16	40	20	5th, Eastern	—	—	—	—
1973–74	New Haven Nighthawks	AHL	—	—	—	—	—	—	—	—	—
1973–74	Minnesota North Stars	NHL	61	20	31	11	7th, West	—	—	—	—
1975–76	New Haven Nighthawks	AHL	76	29	39	8	2nd, Southern	3	0	3	Lost in first round
1976–77	New Haven Nighthawks	AHL	80	43	31	6	2nd, AHL	6	2	4	Lost in first round
1977–78	New Haven Nighthawks	AHL	80	38	31	11	2nd, Southern	15	8	7	Lost in final
1978–79	New Haven Nighthawks	AHL	80	46	25	9	1st, Southern	10	4	6	Lost in final
1979–80	New Haven Nighthawks	AHL	80	46	25	9	1st, Southern	10	6	4	Lost in second round
1981–82	Los Angeles Kings	NHL	42	13	24	5	—	—	—	—	—
NHL totals			103	33	54	16	—	—	—	—	—

== Awards ==
- AHL Second All-Star Team (1956, 1960)
- Louis A.R. Pieri Memorial Award (1978–79)
- Elected to the Cape Breton Sports Hall of Fame (1987).

Preceded by Jack Gordon	Head coach of the Minnesota North Stars; 1973–74	Succeeded by Jack Gordon
Preceded by Bob Berry	Head coach of the Los Angeles Kings; 1981–82	Succeeded by Don Perry
