= Paul Mulvey =

Canadian ice hockey player

- Born: September 27, 1958 (age 68) Sudbury, Ontario, Canada
- Height: 6 ft 4 in (193 cm)
- Weight: 220 lb (100 kg; 15 st 10 lb)
- Position: Left wing
- Shot: Left
- Played for: Washington Capitals; Pittsburgh Penguins; Los Angeles Kings
- NHL draft: 20th overall, 1978; Washington Capitals
- Playing career: 1974–1983

Joseph Paul Mulvey (born September 27, 1958) is a Canadian former professional ice hockey left winger. He played in the National Hockey League with the Washington Capitals, Pittsburgh Penguins, and Los Angeles Kings between 1978 and 1982. Mulvey was born in Sudbury, Ontario and raised in Merritt, British Columbia.

== Playing career ==
In 1972, Mulvey began his career playing in the BCJHL for the Kamloops Rockets, remaining with the team when they relocated to become the Merritt Centennials in 1973. His rights were then traded to the Edmonton Oil Kings of the WCHL for four players from the Kamloops Chiefs in 1974. Mulvey similarly remained with the Oil Kings after the team was relocated to Portland, Oregon to become the Portland Winterhawks after the dissolution of the Portland Buckaroos in 1975. He was drafted 20th overall in the second round of the 1978 NHL Amateur Draft by the Washington Capitals and played three seasons with the team. Mulvey took the role of an enforcer on the ice and was noted for his aggressiveness and stature, setting a record for the most penalty minutes logged in a single season on the Capitals at the time, with 240 penalty minutes collected in the 1979-80 season. Prior to the 1981–82 NHL season, he was sent to the Pittsburgh Penguins as compensation for the Capitals signing of Orest Kindrachuk. He would later be claimed on waivers by the Los Angeles Kings during the middle of the season.

It was during his brief tenure with the Kings that he would be involved in one of the most controversial incidents in the NHL. On January 24, 1982 in a game against the Vancouver Canucks, a fight broke out, and Kings' Head Coach Don Perry ordered Mulvey out onto the ice to fight. Mulvey, who had just returned from a recent suspension, refused, which angered Coach Perry, who then accused him of not standing up for his teammates. Mulvey was benched for the rest of the game, and was placed on waivers a week later. Coach Perry would later be fined and suspended for the incident. Mulvey would never play another game in the NHL, as he was seen as someone who would not stand up for his teammates when the time came.

== Coaching career ==
For many years he was the head coach of the Reston Raiders of the Capital Beltway Hockey League. He then served as the head coach of the Virginia Statesmen of the Eastern Elite Amateur Hockey League and also coached Tier II hockey for the Prince William Panthers Hockey Club in Woodbridge, Virginia.

== Personal life ==
After his playing career, Mulvey returned to the Washington, D.C.-area and settled in Reston, Virginia, where he bought a tennis club and turned it into a hockey facility with two rinks. His rink was instrumental in the growth of hockey in the Northern Virginia region and continues today under different ownership as SkateQuest of Reston.

His older brother, Grant Mulvey, had a long career with the NHL's Chicago Black Hawks.

== Career statistics ==
=== Regular season and playoffs ===
			Regular season					Playoffs
Season	Team	League	GP	G	A	Pts	PIM	GP	G	A	Pts	PIM
1972–73	Kamloops Rockets	BCJHL	—	—	—	—	—	—	—	—	—	—
1973–74	Merritt Centennials	BCJHL	60	27	31	58	200	—	—	—	—	—
1974–75	Edmonton Oil Kings	WCHL	49	18	19	37	179	—	—	—	—	—
1975–76	Edmonton Oil Kings	WCHL	69	29	38	67	331	5	1	3	4	13
1976–77	Portland Winter Hawks	WCHL	63	43	25	68	251	3	2	1	3	11
1977–78	Portland Winter Hawks	WCHL	64	43	33	76	262	8	0	3	3	60
1978–79	Hershey Bears	AHL	24	10	3	13	113	—	—	—	—	—
1978–79	Washington Capitals	NHL	55	7	4	11	81	—	—	—	—	—
1979–80	Washington Capitals	NHL	77	15	19	34	240	—	—	—	—	—
1980–81	Hershey Bears	AHL	19	4	8	12	21	10	2	3	5	54
1980–81	Washington Capitals	NHL	55	7	14	21	166	—	—	—	—	—
1981-82	Pittsburgh Penguins	NHL	27	1	7	8	76	—	—	—	—	—
1981–82	Los Angeles Kings	NHL	11	0	7	7	50	—	—	—	—	—
1981–82	New Haven Nighthawks	AHL	19	3	3	6	65	3	0	0	0	14
1982–83	Moncton Alpines	AHL	58	11	11	22	270	—	—	—	—	—
NHL totals			225	30	51	81	613	—	—	—	—	—
