= Don Perry =

Canadian ice hockey player and coach (1930–2019)

- Born: March 16, 1930 Edmonton, Alberta
- Died: April 15, 2019 (aged 89) Green Valley, Arizona
- Coached for: Los Angeles Kings
- Coaching career: 1955–1984

Donald "Don" Frederick Perry (March 16, 1930 – April 15, 2019) was a Canadian ice hockey defenceman and coach.

== Biography ==
Perry, born in Edmonton, Alberta, began his playing career with Edmonton area junior league teams. He broke into professional hockey in 1950 with the Boston Olympics, and in 1954, he started a long tenure as player-coach with the New Haven Blades of the Eastern Hockey League. Perry's teams were skilled, in 1956 winning the only professional sports championship the city has had. However, they gained a reputation for their physical play that often included fisticuffs. Perry retired from the ice in 1969 with over 600 points in excess of 1000 games at the blue line. He continued to coach the Blades until 1972.

From 1972 until 1981, Perry coached the Saginaw Gears of the International Hockey League. His teams won two Turner Cup championships (1977 & 1981). In 1981, he was hired to coach the New Haven Nighthawks of the American Hockey League, but he held this position for only half a season before he replaced Parker MacDonald behind the Los Angeles Kings' bench. Just weeks into his tenure with the Kings, Perry was suspended for six games for ordering enforcer Paul Mulvey to leave the bench to join a fight.

Perry would guide the Kings to the playoffs in 1982, a postseason that included the famous Miracle on Manchester comeback against the Edmonton Oilers. However, he failed to make the playoffs in 1983 and was fired midway through the 1984 campaign. He continued his career as a Professional Scout for the Los Angeles Kings for more than 10 years before retiring to his long-time home in Hague-on-Lake-George, NY and, subsequently in Green Valley, AZ where he died at a nursing home on April 15, 2019, at the age of 89.

== NHL coaching record ==
Team	Year	Regular season						Postseason
Team	Year	G	W	L	T	Pts	Finish	Result
Los Angeles Kings	1981–82	38	11	17	10	(32)	4th in Smythe	Lost in Division Finals
Los Angeles Kings	1982–83	80	27	41	12	66	5th in Smythe	Missed playoffs
Los Angeles Kings	1983–84	50	14	27	9	(37)	5th in Smythe	(fired)
Total		168	52	85	31			

Preceded by Parker MacDonald	Head coach of the Los Angeles Kings; 1982–84	Succeeded by Rogatien Vachon
