= Pat Quinn (ice hockey) =

Canadian ice hockey player, coach, and executive (1943–2014)

OC Pat Quinn
- Hockey Hall of Fame, 2016 (Builder)
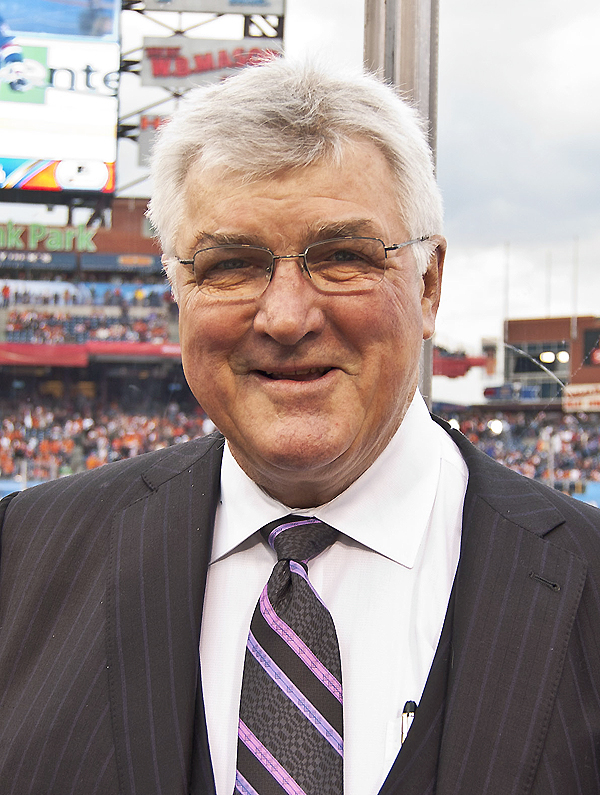
- Quinn at the 2012 NHL Winter Classic
- Born: January 29, 1943 Hamilton, Ontario, Canada
- Died: November 23, 2014 (aged 71) Vancouver, British Columbia, Canada
- Height: 6 ft 3 in (191 cm)
- Weight: 215 lb (98 kg; 15 st 5 lb)
- Position: Defence
- Shot: Left
- Played for: Toronto Maple Leafs; Vancouver Canucks; Atlanta Flames
- Coached for: Philadelphia Flyers; Los Angeles Kings; Vancouver Canucks; Toronto Maple Leafs; Edmonton Oilers
- Playing career: 1963–1977
- Coaching career: 1977–2010

John Brian Patrick Quinn OC (January 29, 1943 – November 23, 2014) was a Canadian ice hockey player, head coach, and executive. Known by the nickname "the Big Irishman", he coached for the National Hockey League (NHL)'s Philadelphia Flyers, Los Angeles Kings, Vancouver Canucks, Toronto Maple Leafs, and Edmonton Oilers, reaching the Stanley Cup Final twice, with the Flyers in 1980 and the Canucks in 1994. Internationally, Quinn coached Team Canada to gold medals at the 2002 Winter Olympics, 2008 IIHF World U18 Championships and 2009 World Junior Championship, as well as World Cup championship in 2004.

Prior to coaching, Quinn was an NHL defenceman, having played nine seasons in the league with the Maple Leafs, Canucks and Atlanta Flames. Coming out of the junior ranks with the Edmonton Oil Kings, he won a Memorial Cup with the club in 1963. He later won another Memorial Cup as part-owner of the Vancouver Giants in 2007.

He was appointed Officer of the Order of Canada (OC) in the 2012 Canadian honours. In 2016, he was inducted into the Hockey Hall of Fame, and the IIHF Hall of Fame.

== Playing career ==
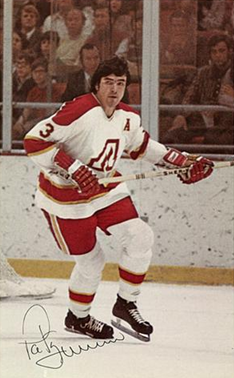
1972 photo of Pat Quinn for Atlanta Flames

Quinn began his junior career with the Hamilton Tiger Cubs and Hamilton Kilty B's in the Ontario Hockey Association (OHA). After graduating high school, Quinn accepted a scholarship from Michigan Tech, but was declared ineligible to play by the NCAA because he had already signed his rights to the Detroit Red Wings. He instead joined the Edmonton Oil Kings of the Central Alberta Hockey League (CAHL), helping the club to the 1963 Memorial Cup in his only year with Edmonton, playing alongside fellow future NHL player, coach, and manager Glen Sather.

Quinn turned pro in 1963–64 and began stints in several minor leagues, including the Eastern Hockey League (EHL), Central Hockey League (CHL) and Western Hockey League (WHL). While playing with the Tulsa Oilers, Quinn was called up by the Toronto Maple Leafs in 1968, making his NHL debut. During his rookie season with the Maple Leafs, he is probably best remembered for an open-ice bodycheck on Bobby Orr in the 1969 playoffs against the Boston Bruins that left Orr unconscious and provoked a bench-clearing brawl.

After two seasons with the Maple Leafs, the Vancouver Canucks claimed Quinn in the 1970 NHL Expansion Draft. He played two seasons in Vancouver, before being again left unprotected in the 1972 NHL Expansion Draft, where he was claimed by the Atlanta Flames and served as team captain. Quinn retired prematurely in 1977 after suffering an ankle injury.

== Management and coaching ==
=== Philadelphia Flyers ===
Quinn became an assistant coach for the Philadelphia Flyers in 1977 under Fred Shero, and was named head coach of the Flyers' American Hockey League (AHL) affiliate, the Maine Mariners, the following season. Quinn returned to the Flyers late that season, however, as head coach of the NHL club (with prior head coach Bob McCammon going back to Maine), and during the 1979–80 NHL season (his first full season with the Flyers) Quinn led the team to a record breaking 35-game unbeaten streak that culminated in a trip to the 1980 Stanley Cup Final, where they were upset by the New York Islanders in six games. Quinn won the Jack Adams Award for his effort. He stayed with the Flyers two more years, but was replaced late in the 1981-82 season.

=== Los Angeles Kings ===
Quinn briefly left hockey, but remained in the Philadelphia area to attend law school at Widener University. In 1984, he was named head coach of the Los Angeles Kings and went on to finish his degree at the University of San Diego.

In his first season back coaching, Quinn returned the Kings to the playoffs after a two-year absence with a 23-point improvement in the standings, but were swept in the opening round by the eventual Stanley Cup champion Edmonton Oilers. In December 1986, Quinn signed a contract to become the President and General Manager of the Vancouver Canucks for the 1987–88 NHL season while still under contract with the Kings. Quinn, a lawyer, maintained that the Kings had missed a deadline on an option on his contract, which had a clause allowing him to negotiate with other teams. NHL President John Ziegler suspended Quinn for the rest of the season and barred him from taking over Vancouver's hockey operations until June. Ziegler also barred Quinn from coaching anywhere in the NHL until the 1990–91 season. In Ziegler's view, Quinn's actions created a serious conflict of interest that could only be resolved by having him removed as coach. The Kings tried unsuccessfully to sue the Canucks for tampering.

=== Vancouver Canucks ===
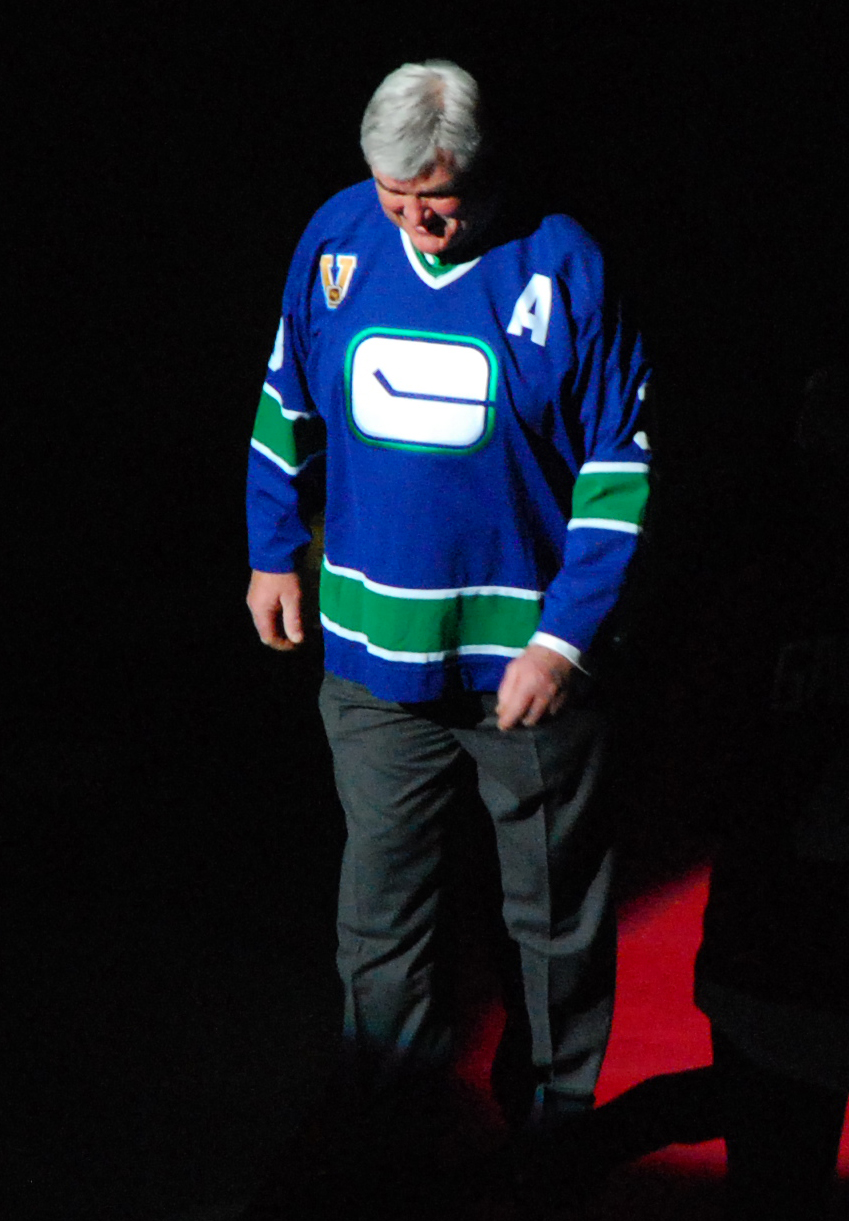
Quinn at Pacific Coliseum during Gordie Howe Night in Vancouver, March 2008

Restricted from coaching, Quinn joined the Canucks the following season in 1987–88 as President and General Manager. He made his first significant transaction, bringing in future franchise goaltender Kirk McLean from the New Jersey Devils along with forward Greg Adams, for centre Patrik Sundström and the Canucks' 1988 fourth-round draft pick (Matt Ruchty), on September 15, 1987. Quinn continued to make an impact in his first two NHL entry drafts, selecting future team captain Trevor Linden second overall in 1988 and Pavel Bure 113th overall in 1989. Linden went on to become the franchise's all-time leading scorer and have his jersey retired by the Canucks. Bure, meanwhile, won the Calder Memorial Trophy as league rookie-of-the-year in his first year and recorded three 50-goal seasons with the Canucks and also had his jersey retired.

Bure's selection was highly controversial, however, as Quinn had seemingly chosen him a year ahead of his eligible draft season. At the age of 18, Bure was available to be chosen in the first three rounds of the draft, but in order to be selected any later than that, he would have had to play in at least two seasons (with a minimum of 11 games per season) for his elite-level European club, the Central Red Army. The Canucks' head scout at the time, Mike Penny, discovered that Bure had played in additional exhibition and international games to make him an eligible late-round draft choice a year early, however. Quinn originally intended to draft Bure in the eighth round, but after receiving word that the Edmonton Oilers had similar intentions, he selected him in the sixth. Team executives reportedly stormed the Met Center stage in Minnesota, where the draft was being held, protesting the choice immediately following its announcement. The league investigated the selection and originally deemed it illegal. Quinn and the Canucks appealed the decision and it was not until the eve of the 1990 NHL entry draft, in which Bure would have been re-entered, that the draft choice was upheld.

In 1991, with the coaching ban lifted, he took over the head coach position with the Canucks for the remaining 26 games of the 1990–91 season. Entering his first full season as Canucks head coach in 1991–92, Quinn met further resistance regarding Bure, who was set to play his rookie season, from the Soviet Ice Hockey Federation. Soviet officials called for Bure's contract with the Central Red Army and the two sides went to court in October 1991 with the Soviets agreeing to a $250,000 settlement. Quinn signed Bure to a four-year contract soon thereafter, on October 31, worth a reported $2.7 million with an $800,000 signing bonus. Quinn went on to win his second Jack Adams Award as a dramatically improved Canucks squad succeeded in winning the Smythe division. The Canucks repeated as division champions the following season in 1992–93 before appearing in the 1994 Stanley Cup Final against the New York Rangers. Despite a lackluster regular season in which the Canucks finished with the seventh seed in their conference, the team that had been entirely built by Quinn got past the Calgary Flames, Dallas Stars and Toronto Maple Leafs in the first three rounds. The Canucks pushed the first-overall Rangers to a seven-game series in the final, but lost the seventh and deciding game.

Following his second Stanley Cup Final appearance, Quinn gave up his coaching duties to focus on his roles as President and General Manager. In the mid-1990s, the Canucks ownership gradually shifted from the Griffiths family to a new group led by John McCaw Jr. In November 1997, Quinn was fired by the new ownership, with whom Quinn did not see eye-to-eye.

=== Toronto Maple Leafs ===
Mural for Quinn, with the bottom portion of the mural depicting him as a member of the Maple Leafs

Before the 1998–99 NHL season, Quinn was named head coach of the Toronto Maple Leafs. In his first season, the Maple Leafs improved dramatically, transitioning from a plodding checking team to a speedy scoring team that reached the conference finals, losing to the Buffalo Sabres. He was named a finalist for the Jack Adams Award, and was given the additional duties of General Manager. Quinn took on the General Manager position, reportedly to preempt Leafs President Ken Dryden from hiring his preferred GM which was former Habs teammate Bob Gainey.

Three years later, the Maple Leafs made it to the 2002 Conference Finals, but were eliminated by the Carolina Hurricanes. In August 2003, Quinn was replaced as general manager by John Ferguson Jr., who became the league's youngest general manager at 36, but still retained his coaching duties.

Following the 2004–05 NHL lockout, the Maple Leafs failed to qualify for the playoffs for the first time with Quinn as head coach in 2005–06. As a result, Quinn was fired along with assistant coach and former teammate Rick Ley on April 20, 2006. The Maple Leafs had suffered season-ending injuries from key players Eric Lindros, Jason Allison, Alex Khavanov and Ed Belfour, all of whom had been signed as free agents by Ferguson the preceding off-season. Despite losing all four players to injury, the Maple Leafs finished the season going 9–1–2 with a younger lineup of prospects, many of whom were drafted by Quinn during his tenure as general manager. Aside from Toronto's lack of success, however, it was speculated that the decision to fire Quinn was a result of friction between him and general manager Ferguson (who denied it), as well as a split in the ownership of Maple Leafs Sports and Entertainment with Ferguson being backed by MLSE Chairman Larry Tannebaum and with Quinn being supported by Ken Thomson (whose Woodbridge holding company had planned to but never did increase its stake in MLSE). Amid speculation of his firing leading up to the official announcement, team captain Mats Sundin and veteran Darcy Tucker had both pledged support for Quinn through the media. Under Quinn, the Maple Leafs had consistently been contenders, recording three 100-point seasons and making the playoffs every season until his last, despite never advancing past the conference finals.

=== International ===
Medal record

Men's ice hockey

Representing Canada

Olympic Games
Gold medal – first place	2002 Salt Lake City	Team

World Cup
Gold medal – first place	2004 Toronto	

Representing Canada U20

World Junior Championships
Gold medal – first place	2009 Ottawa	

Representing Canada U18

U18 World Championships
Gold medal – first place	2008 Kazan	

At the 2002 Olympic Winter Games in Salt Lake City, Utah, Quinn coached Team Canada to their first Olympic gold medal since 1952, with a 5–2 victory over Team USA in the gold medal game. He subsequently received a standing ovation from the fans in Montreal for his efforts in his first NHL game back from the Olympics.

Two years later, in 2004, Quinn coached Team Canada to victory in the 2004 World Cup with a perfect 6–0 record, capped off by a 3–2 victory over Finland in the final.

Looking to defend their 2002 Olympic gold medal, Hockey Canada chose Quinn once again to coach Team Canada at the 2006 Winter Olympics in Turin. Despite high expectations, Canada went 3–2 through the preliminary round, losing to Switzerland and Finland, both by 2–0 shutouts, then lost to Russia, again by a 2–0 score, in the quarter-finals.

Without an NHL coaching job, having been let go by the Maple Leafs at the end of the 2005–06 season, Quinn was chosen to coach Team Canada at the 2006 Spengler Cup. They made it to the final game against HC Davos, but lost 3–2.

Two years later, Quinn turned to junior hockey, serving as head coach for Team Canada in the 2008 IIHF World U18 Championships. He led Canada to the finals against Russia, taking the title by an 8–0 score. With established success at the junior international level, Quinn was chosen to coach the Canadian under-20 team for the 2009 World Junior Championships as the host country in Ottawa. He led Canada to an undefeated record in tournament play and a fifth consecutive gold medal, defeating Sweden 5–1 in the final.

=== Edmonton Oilers ===
After a three-year absence from the NHL in which he coached Team Canada at the Spengler Cup, the under-18 and junior teams, Quinn was named the head coach of the Edmonton Oilers in 2009, replacing Craig MacTavish. In Quinn's only season as head coach of the Oilers, the team finished in last place in the league with a record of 27–47–8.

Pat Quinn was replaced by Tom Renney as head coach on June 22, 2010. Quinn remained a senior advisor of hockey operations until after the 2010–11 season.

== Personal life ==
Quinn was born in 1943 and grew up in east Hamilton, Ontario. He was a cousin of former professional wrestler "Big" John Quinn.

Quinn graduated with a B.A. in economics in 1972 from York University in Toronto, Ontario, three years after he began his NHL career with the Toronto Maple Leafs. After retiring from his playing career in 1977, Quinn considered law school, but instead accepted a coaching position with the Philadelphia Flyers. Nearly five years later, he was fired by the Flyers in time to take the exam for spring acceptance into law school. Being under contract with the Flyers, his tuition was subsidized by the NHL club. He earned his J.D. degree from the Widener University School of Law, in Delaware.

Quinn never practiced law, but used his legal knowledge in his executive positions with the Vancouver Canucks and Maple Leafs.

=== Death ===
Quinn died at the Vancouver General Hospital in Vancouver on November 23, 2014, following a long battle with illness. He had been unable to attend the 2014 Hockey Hall of Fame induction ceremony on November 17 due to his illness.

== Honours and legacy ==
=== Honours ===
- Won Memorial Cup with the Edmonton Oil Kings in 1963 (as a player) and Vancouver Giants in 2007 (as a minority owner).
- Won Jack Adams Award (NHL coach of the year) in 1980 (Philadelphia Flyers) and 1992 (Vancouver Canucks).
- Won Winter Olympic gold medal with Team Canada in 2002 as head coach.
- Won World Cup championship with Team Canada in 2004 as head coach.
- Won IIHF U18 gold medal with Team Canada in 2008 as head coach.
- Won IIHF U20 gold medal with Team Canada in 2009 as head coach.
- Inducted into the Hockey Hall of Fame in 2016.
- Inducted into the IIHF Hall of Fame in 2016.

=== Legacy ===
Quinn is credited with popularizing the terms "upper body injury" and "lower body injury" to describe injuries to his players, terms which are now commonplace around the NHL. The term originated during the 1999 Stanley Cup Playoffs when Quinn described an injury sustained to defenceman Dmitri Yushkevich against the Philadelphia Flyers as an "upper body injury". Quinn said he came up with the term "out of the blue" and said he did so because he was tired of having to talk about injuries (as well as worrying about Yushkevich's safety in a physical series). The NHL allows the descriptors as it does not violate league policy against "misleading information" while also maintaining a player's right to privacy over their medical information. Nevertheless, its usage is controversial around the league. In 2018, the Concussion Legacy Foundation stated that the terms provide confusion concerning concussion symptoms, and Ken Hitchcock, then coach of the Dallas Stars, scrapped the practice in favour of specificity because he believed "(the media) knows what the injury is anyway". That same year, Leafs head coach Mike Babcock said he would continue to use the descriptors, because he says it allows "the right people" to work on the injury without "(the media) confusing things", and Washington Capitals forward T. J. Oshie said he prefers the protection because "there are too many idiots who'd target (the injured area)" if they knew about the injury.

Quinn was a member of the committee that determines who is inducted into the Hockey Hall of Fame. In 2013, he was named the Chairman of the committee.

=== Memorials ===
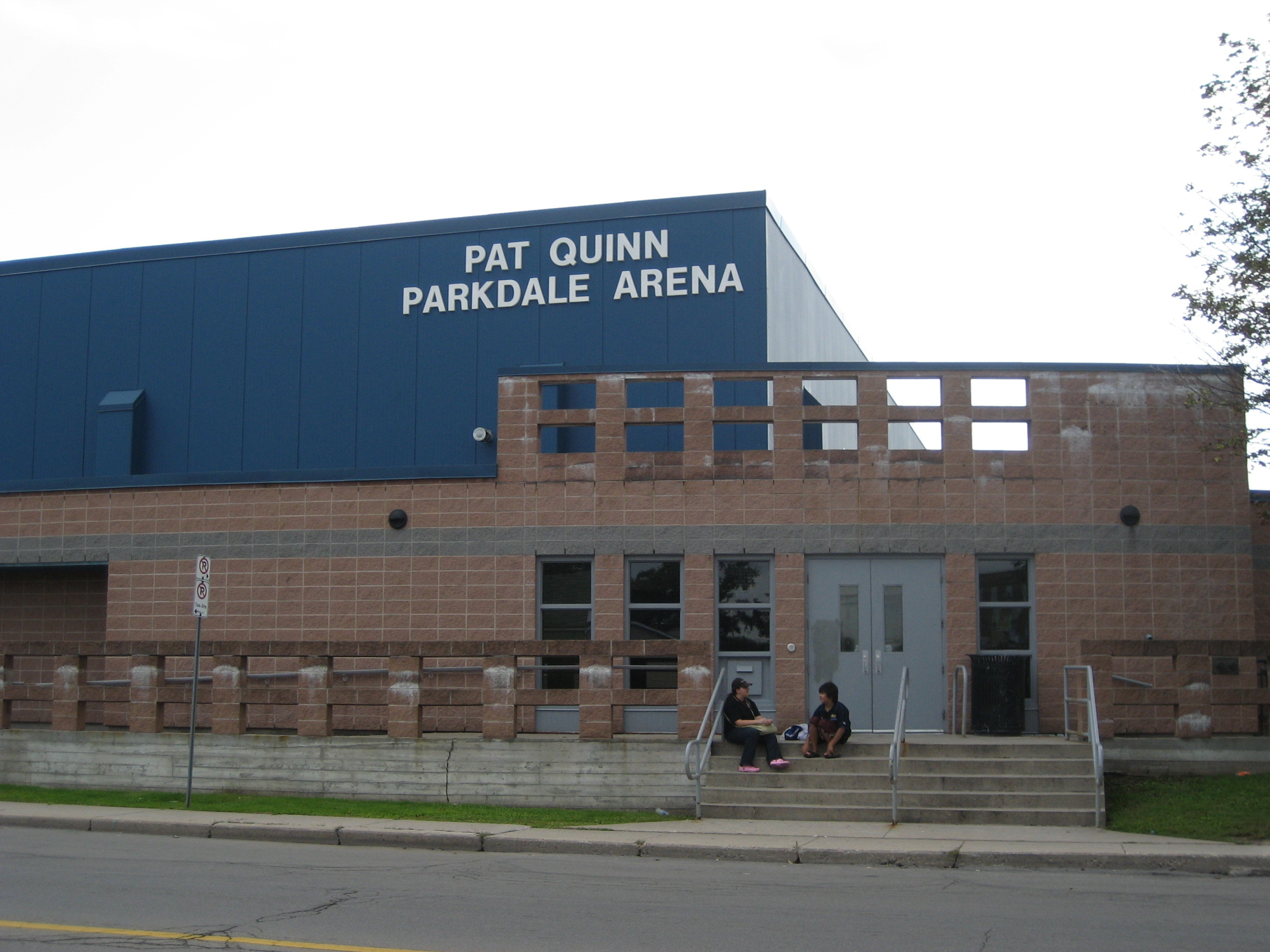
The Pat Quinn Parkdale Arena was named in Quinn's honour in June 2005

On June 9, 2005, the city of Hamilton, Ontario, honoured Quinn at a special ceremony at Parkdale Arena, on the corner of Main Street East and Parkdale Avenue North, where the arena was officially renamed the Pat Quinn Parkdale Arena. On June 8, 2006, Quinn returned to his hometown in Hamilton to accept an honorary Doctor of Laws degree from McMaster University. He addressed the convocation of Social Sciences graduates, saying that "education is a toolbox to make career changes. It is good advice for you to follow your dreams, listen to your heart and obey your passion".

On March 17, 2015, before the NHL game between the Philadelphia Flyers and the Vancouver Canucks, the city of Vancouver, British Columbia officially unveiled the new name of the 700-block of Abbott Street located just outside Rogers Arena to "Pat Quinn Way".

In 2015 Dan Robson wrote a biography on Quinn titled Quinn: The Life of a Hockey Legend.

== Career statistics ==
=== Regular season and playoffs ===
			Regular season					Playoffs
Season	Team	League	GP	G	A	Pts	PIM	GP	G	A	Pts	PIM
1958–59	Hamilton Tiger Cubs	OHA	20	0	1	1	34	—	—	—	—	—
1959–60	Hamilton Tiger Cubs	OHA	27	0	1	1	58	—	—	—	—	—
1960–61	Hamilton Kilty B's	MetJHL	—	—	—	—	—	—	—	—	—	—
1961–62	Hamilton Kilty B's	MetJHL	—	—	—	—	—	—	—	—	—	—
1961–62	Hamilton Tiger Cubs	OHA	1	0	0	0	0	—	—	—	—	—
1962–63	Edmonton Oil Kings	CAHL	—	—	—	—	—	—	—	—	—	—
1962–63	Edmonton Oil Kings	M-Cup	—	—	—	—	—	19	2	10	12	49
1963–64	Knoxville Knights	EHL	72	6	31	37	217	8	1	3	4	34
1964–65	Tulsa Oilers	CHL	70	3	32	35	202	3	0	0	0	0
1965–66	Memphis Wings	CHL	67	2	16	18	135	—	—	—	—	—
1966–67	Seattle Totems	WHL	35	1	3	4	49	5	0	0	0	2
1966–67	Houston Apollos	CHL	15	10	3	13	36	—	—	—	—	—
1967–68	Tulsa Oilers	CHL	51	3	15	18	178	11	1	4	5	19
1968–69	Tulsa Oilers	CHL	17	0	6	6	25	—	—	—	—	—
1968–69	Toronto Maple Leafs	NHL	40	2	7	9	95	4	0	0	0	13
1969–70	Tulsa Oilers	CHL	2	0	1	1	6	—	—	—	—	—
1969–70	Toronto Maple Leafs	NHL	59	0	5	5	88	—	—	—	—	—
1970–71	Vancouver Canucks	NHL	76	2	11	13	149	—	—	—	—	—
1971–72	Vancouver Canucks	NHL	57	2	3	5	63	—	—	—	—	—
1972–73	Atlanta Flames	NHL	78	2	18	20	113	—	—	—	—	—
1973–74	Atlanta Flames	NHL	77	5	27	32	94	4	0	0	0	6
1974–75	Atlanta Flames	NHL	80	2	19	21	156	—	—	—	—	—
1975–76	Atlanta Flames	NHL	80	2	11	13	134	2	0	1	1	2
1976–77	Atlanta Flames	NHL	59	1	12	13	58	1	0	0	0	0
NHL totals			606	18	113	131	950	11	0	1	1	21

== Coaching record ==
Team	Year	Regular season							Postseason			
Team	Year	G	W	L	T	OTL	Pts	Finish	W	L	Win %	Result
PHI	1978–79	30	18	8	4	—	42	2nd in Patrick	3	5	.375	Lost in quarterfinals (NYR)
PHI	1979–80	80	48	12	20	—	116	1st in Patrick	13	6	.684	Lost in Stanley Cup Final (NYI)
PHI	1980–81	80	41	24	15	—	97	2nd in Patrick	6	6	.500	Lost in quarterfinals (CGY)
PHI	1981–82	72	34	29	9	—	72	Fired	—	—	—	—
PHI total		262	141	73	48	—	.630		22	17	.564	3 playoff appearances
LAK	1984–85	80	34	32	14	—	82	4th in Smythe	0	3	.000	Lost in Division semifinals (EDM)
LAK	1985–86	80	23	49	8	—	54	5th in Smythe	—	—	—	Missed playoffs
LAK	1986–87	42	18	20	4	—	40	Resigned	—	—	—	—
LAK total		202	75	101	26		.436		0	3	.000	1 playoff appearance
VAN	1990–91	26	9	13	4	—	22	4th in Smythe	2	4	.333	Lost in Division semifinals (LAK)
VAN	1991–92	80	42	26	12	—	96	1st in Smythe	6	7	.462	Lost in Division finals (EDM)
VAN	1992–93	84	46	29	9	—	101	1st in Smythe	6	6	.500	Lost in Division finals (LAK)
VAN	1993–94	84	41	40	3	—	85	2nd in Pacific	15	9	.625	Lost in Stanley Cup Final (NYR)
VAN	1995–96	6	3	3	0	—	6	3rd in Pacific	2	4	.333	Lost in Conference quarterfinals (COL)
VAN total		280	141	111	28		.554		31	30	.508	5 playoff appearances
TOR	1998–99	82	45	30	7	—	97	2nd in Northeast	9	8	.529	Lost in Conference finals (BUF)
TOR	1999–00	82	45	27	7	3	100	1st in Northeast	6	6	.500	Lost in Conference semifinals (NJD)
TOR	2000–01	82	37	29	11	5	90	3rd in Northeast	7	4	.636	Lost in Conference semifinals (NJD)
TOR	2001–02	82	43	25	10	4	100	2nd in Northeast	10	10	.500	Lost in Conference finals (CAR)
TOR	2002–03	82	44	28	7	3	98	2nd in Northeast	3	4	.429	Lost in Conference quarterfinals (PHI)
TOR	2003–04	82	45	24	10	3	103	2nd in Northeast	6	7	.462	Lost in Conference semifinals (PHI)
TOR	2005–06	82	41	33	—	8	90	4th in Northeast	—	—	—	Missed playoffs
TOR total		574	300	196	52	26	.591		41	39	.513	6 playoff appearances
EDM	2009–10	82	27	47	—	8	62	5th in Northwest	—	—	—	Missed playoffs
EDM total		82	27	47	—	8	.378		—	—	—	0 playoff appearances
NHL Total		1,400	684	528	154	34	.555		94	89	.514	15 playoff appearances

Preceded by Keith McCreary	Atlanta Flames captain 1975–77	Succeeded by Tom Lysiak
Preceded by Bob McCammon	Head coach of the Philadelphia Flyers; 1979–82	Succeeded by Bob McCammon
Preceded by Al Arbour	Winner of the Jack Adams Award; 1980	Succeeded by Red Berenson
Preceded by Roger Neilson	Head coach of the Los Angeles Kings; 1984–86	Succeeded by Mike Murphy
Preceded by Jack Gordon	General manager of the Vancouver Canucks; 1987–97	Succeeded by Brian Burke
Preceded by Bob McCammon	Head coach of the Vancouver Canucks; 1991–94	Succeeded by Rick Ley
Preceded by Brian Sutter	Winner of the Jack Adams Award; 1992	Succeeded by Pat Burns
Preceded by Rick Ley	Head coach of the Vancouver Canucks; 1996	Succeeded by Tom Renney
Preceded by Ken Dryden	General manager of the Toronto Maple Leafs; 1999–2003	Succeeded by John Ferguson Jr.
Preceded by Mike Murphy	Head coach of the Toronto Maple Leafs; 1998–2006	Succeeded by Paul Maurice
Preceded by Craig MacTavish	Head coach of the Edmonton Oilers; 2009–10	Succeeded by Tom Renney
