= 2012 Canadian honours =

Canadian government recognitions

The following are the appointments to various Canadian Honours of 2012. Usually, they are announced as part of the New Year and Canada Day celebrations and are published within the Canada Gazette during year. This follows the custom set out within the United Kingdom which publishes its appoints of various British Honours for New Year's and for monarch's official birthday. However, instead of the midyear appointments announced on Victoria Day, the official birthday of the Canadian Monarch, this custom has been transferred with the celebration of Canadian Confederation and the creation of the Order of Canada.

As the Canada Gazette publishes appointment to various orders, decorations and medal, either Canadian or from Commonwealth and foreign states, this article will reference all Canadians so honoured during the 2012 calendar year.

Provincial Honours are not listed within the Canada Gazette, however they are listed within the various publications of each provincial government. Provincial honours are listed within the page.

2012 was also the year of the Diamond Jubilee of Queen Elizabeth II, Queen of Canada. 60,000 Canadians had been awarded with the Queen Elizabeth II Diamond Jubilee Medal during this anniversary year.

== The Order of Canada ==
=== Companions of the Order of Canada ===
- The Honourable Ian Corneil Binnie, C.C.
- Natalie Zemon Davis, C.C.
- The Right Honourable Paul Edgar Philippe Martin, P.C., C.C.
- Yannick Nézet-Séguin, C.C.

=== Officer of the Order of Canada ===
- Robert G. Bertram, O.C.
- Jean Bissonnette, O.C.
- Francine Décary, O.C., O.Q.
- Elizabeth Dowdeswell, O.C.
- Angèle Dubeau, O.C., C.Q. - This is a promotion within the Order
- Paul Hoffman, O.C.
- Prabhat Jha, O.C.
- Ralph Klein, O.C., A.O.E.
- Maryse Lassonde, O.C., C.Q.
- John Last, O.C.
- Jean-François Lépine, O.C.
- Hadi-Khan Mahabadi, O.C.
- Ermanno Mauro, O.C.
- Marianne McKenna, O.C.
- Craig Oliver, O.C.
- The Honourable P. Michael Pitfield, P.C., O.C., C.V.O.
- Sharon Pollock, O.C.
- John Brian Patrick (Pat) Quinn, O.C.
- The Honourable John D. Richard, O.C.
- Cecil H. Rorabeck, O.C.
- Louise Roy, O.C., O.Q.
- Gordon Semenoff, O.C.
- Chantal St-Cyr Hébert, O.C.
- Gilles Tremblay, O.C., O.Q.
- The Honourable Marilyn Trenholme Counsell, O.C., D.St.J., O.N.B.
- General Maurice Baril, O.C., C.M.M., M.S.M., C.D. (Retired)
- The Honourable James Bartleman, O.C., O.Ont.
- Aldo Albert Daniel Bensadoun, O.C.
- Lieutenant-General Joseph Jacques Charles Bouchard, O.C., C.M.M., M.S.C., C.D.
- William Scott Bowman, O.C.
- Alain Dubuc, O.C.
- Robert R. Fowler, O.C.
- Donald A. S. Fraser, O.C.
- Gordon Guyatt, O.C.
- General Rick J. Hillier, O.C., C.M.M., M.S.C., C.D. (Retired)
- P. Thomas (Tom) Jenkins, O.C.
- Hugh A. Krentz, O.C.
- Bruce Kuwabara, O.C.
- The Honourable Kevin G. Lynch, P.C., O.C.
- R. Peter MacKinnon, O.C.
- James McEwen, O.C.
- Stuart McLean, O.C.
- Jean-Jacques Nattiez, O.C., C.Q. - This is a promotion within the Order
- Charles Pachter, O.C. - This is a promotion within the Order
- Catherine Robbin, O.C.
- Seymour Schulich, O.C.
- David W. Scott, O.C.
- Jeffrey Skoll, O.C.
- Calvin Ralph Stiller, O.C., O.Ont. - This is a promotion within the Order
- Yuli Turovsky, O.C., C.Q.
- Brian Williams, O.C.
- Tim Wynne-Jones, O.C.
- Alvin Zipursky, O.C.

=== Members of the Order of Canada ===
- Carolyn Acker, C.M.
- Dyane Adam, C.M.
- Patsy Anderson, C.M.
- Allan Gordon Bell, C.M.
- Arthur Norman Bielfeld, C.M.
- Roger Bland, C.M.
- Robert Bourne, C.M.
- Pierre Bruneau, C.M., O.Q.
- John Buhler, C.M.
- Silver Donald Cameron, C.M.
- Stephen Chatman, C.M.
- Guy Corneau, C.M.
- Franklin Delaney, C.M.
- Wadih M. Fares, C.M.
- Anthony (Tony) Fields, C.M.
- Allan Gotlib, C.M.
- Michel Goulet, C.M.
- Alia Hogben, C.M.
- Greg Hollingshead, C.M.
- Nancy Kilgour, C.M.
- Henry Kloppenburg, C.M.
- Merril Knudtson, C.M.
- The Honourable Frances Lankin, P.C., C.M.
- Louis LaPierre, C.M.
- William Laskin, C.M.
- Monique F. Leroux, C.M.
- Guy Maddin, C.M., O.M.
- Salem Masry, C.M.
- Kenneth Maybee, C.M., O.M.M., C.D.
- Des McAnuff, C.M.
- Elizabeth McWeeny, C.M.
- Lois Mitchell, C.M.
- Bernice Morgan, C.M.
- Marian Packham, C.M.
- Gordon Rawlinson, C.M.
- Jean-Guy Rioux, C.M.
- Michèle Rouleau, C.M., C.Q.
- Marie Saint Pierre, C.M., C.Q.
- Emanuele (Lino) Saputo, C.M., O.Q.
- Steven Schipper, C.M.
- Cyril Simard, C.M., O.Q.
- Laure Waridel, C.M.
- Miriam Adams, C.M.
- Archibald (Archie) Alleyne, C.M.
- Cheryl Bartlett, C.M.
- Hans-Ludwig Blohm, C.M.
- Margaret Bloodworth, C.M.
- Lawrence S. Bloomberg, C.M., O.Ont.
- Benoît Bouchard, C.M.
- France Chrétien Desmarais, C.M.
- Jocelyne Côté-O'Hara, C.M.
- Tom Dawe, C.M.
- Jean Deslauriers, C.M.
- Daphne E. Dumont, C.M.
- John T. Ferguson, C.M.
- Mary Ferguson-Paré, C.M.
- Joella Foulds, C.M.
- Mary Margaret Hetherington, C.M.
- Noel Pattison James, C.M.
- Ana Paula Lopes, C.M.
- Denis Losier, C.M.
- Leslie (Les) Manning, C.M.
- Michael Meaney, C.M., C.Q.
- David Northcott, C.M., O.M.
- Ratna Omidvar, C.M., O.Ont.
- Aaju Peter, C.M.
- Samuel Pierre, C.M., C.Q.
- Sean Riley, C.M.
- Pierrette Robitaille, C.M.
- Nigel Rusted, C.M., O.N.L.
- Kathy Sendall, C.M.
- Louise Sicuro, C.M.
- Margaret Spoelstra, C.M.
- Anita Stewart, C.M.
- Claude St-Laurent, C.M.
- Garnette Sutherland, C.M.
- Donald John Taylor, C.M.
- Maïr Verthuy, C.M.
- Bernard Zinman, C.M.

== Order of Merit of the Police Forces ==
=== Commander of the Order of Merit of the Police Forces ===
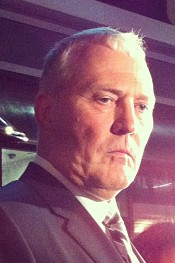
The Honourable William Sterling Blair, Commander of the Order of Merit of the Police Forces

- Chief William Sterling Blair (This is a promotion within the Order.)

=== Officers of the Order of Merit of the Police Forces ===
- Assistant Commissioner Roger L. Brown
- Chief Constable Michael Robert Chadwick
- Superintendent Mario Di Tommaso
- Chief Robert Philip Johnston
- Deputy Chief Constable Douglas A. LePard (This is a promotion within the Order.)
- Chief Thomas Mathew McKenzie
- Chief Stephen J. Tanner
- Chief Matthew A. Torigian

=== Members of the Order of Merit of the Police Forces ===
- Inspector William A. Renton
- Sergeant Jocelyn April
- Mr. Alexandre Beaudoin
- Maître Francis Brabant
- Staff Sergeant Patrick Adrian Cahill
- Sergeant François Caron
- Assistant Director General François Charpentier
- Superintendent Deborah Clark
- Deputy Chief Andrew M. Fletcher
- Chief Inspector Yves Guay
- Sergeant Mark Houldworth
- Deputy Chief Constable Richard John Lucy
- Sergeant Michael J. MacDonald
- Constable Linda A. Malcolm
- Sergeant Mike Novakowski
- Inspector Trent Rolfe
- Sergeant Daniel Patrick Russell
- Inspector Sean Ryan
- Superintendent John Schmidt
- Detective Constable Jonathan P. R. Sheldan
- Superintendent William Stewart
- Chief Superintendent Richard Bruce Taylor
- Deputy Chief S. Brent Thomlison
- Inspector Scott A. Thompson
- Inspector Richard Wayne Votour
- Deputy Chief Alan Williams

=== Erratum ===
- The notice published on page 746 of the March 24, 2012, issue of the Canada Gazette, Part I, is hereby amended as follows: Member of the Order of Merit of the Police Forces, as of January 5, 2012 to Sergeant John Mark Houldsworth

== Royal Victorian Order ==
Undress ribbon for all grades of the Royal Victorian Order

=== Lieutenant of the Royal Victorian Order ===
- Herbert Allen Le Roy

=== Member of the Royal Victorian Order ===
- Rosemary Doyle-Morier
- William John Edward Stewart

== Most Venerable Order of the Hospital of St. John of Jerusalem ==
Undress ribbon for all grades of the Most Venerable Order of the Hospital of St. John of Jerusalem

=== Bailiff Grand Cross of the Order of St. John ===
- Frederick Richard Bruce, MOM, Brandon, MB

=== Knights and Dames of the Order of St. John ===
- Mairi Christina Arthur, Bedford, NS - This is a promotion within the Order
- Lieutenant-Colonel Daniel Sutherland Campbell Mackay, OMM, CD, Ottawa, ON
- His Honour, the Honourable Brigadier General (Retired) John James Grant, CMM, CD, Halifax, NS
- Her Honour, the Honourable Vaughn Solomon Schofield, SOM, Winnipeg, MB

=== Commanders of the Order of St. John ===
- Kirk Woodruff Corkery, CD, Richmond Hill, ON - This is a promotion within the Order
- Teresa Kim Kwong, Calgary, AB - This is a promotion within the Order
- Andrea Libby, Fredericton, NB - This is a promotion within the Order
- Mia Michelle Nagasaki, Alliston, ON - This is a promotion within the Order
- Corporal (Retired) Alvin Reginald Windley, CD, Calgary, AB - This is a promotion within the Order
- Douglas Gordon Labron, Brockville, ON
- Terrence Howard Wardrop, Burlington, ON

=== Officers of the Order of St. John ===
- Alan Thomas Blundell, Mississauga, ON - This is a promotion within the Order
- Laurence Cheng, Vancouver, BC - This is a promotion within the Order
- The Venerable Edward Norman Dallow, CD, Kingston, ON - This is a promotion within the Order
- Les Johnson, Ottawa, ON - This is a promotion within the Order
- Joseph Paul Andre Roger Lavallee, CD, Brighton, ON - This is a promotion within the Order
- Nancy Diane Mattinson, Kingston, NS - This is a promotion within the Order
- Major Larry McMorran, CD, Dundas, ON - This is a promotion within the Order
- Carol Elizabeth Parsons, Mount Pearl, NL - This is a promotion within the Order
- Major Joseph John Petozzi, CD, Binbrook, ON - This is a promotion within the Order
- Katelyn Rose Szlater, Calgary, AB - This is a promotion within the Order
- Peter Tang, Vancouver, BC - This is a promotion within the Order
- Gerald Joseph Antle Jr., Goulds, NL
- James William Carroll, Logy Bay, NL
- Captain Jason Brent English, MMM, CD, Winnipeg, MB
- Donna Marie Hansen, CD, Ottawa, ON
- Leslie Helen Jack, Grimsby, ON
- Alain Laurencelle, Winnipeg, MB
- Linda Oakes, Guelph, ON
- Wayne Albert Purchase, Conception Bay South, NL
- Sergeant Brent Kenneth Schriner, CD, Hamilton, ON
- Colonel Richard Brian Stasuik, CD, Nanaimo, BC

=== Members of the Order of St. John ===
- Sergeant (Retired) Stephen Gerald Andrews, CD, Trenton, ON
- Gary Edwin Ashby, Porter's Lake, NS
- Master Seaman Heather Frances Bardell, CD, Kingston, ON
- Stèven Bélanger, Baie-Comeau, QC
- Allan Burnell Bird, CD, Manotick, ON
- Karine Dufresne, Montréal, QC
- Major Dean Paul Gresko, CD, Thunder Bay, ON
- Josephine Hall, Nepean, ON
- Jacques Janson, Ottawa, ON
- Donald Richard Jellie, Courtenay, BC
- Patricia Katherine Kearney, Ottawa, ON
- Beverly Eileen Lafortune, Edmonton, AB
- Maxime Lefebvre, Saint-Jérôme, QC
- Ian Joseph MacIntyre, Halifax, NS
- Walter William Makortoff, Heffley Creek, BC
- Kristeen McKee, Sudbury, ON
- Holly Jane McKenzie, Barrie, ON
- Jane Elizabeth McLaren, Cornwall, ON
- Honorary Colonel John Buckingham Newman, Toronto, ON
- Dennis O'Grady, Grand Falls-Windsor, NL
- Reverend Lloyd O'Neill, Halifax, NS
- Sebastien Rheaume, Rawdon, QC
- Margaret Helen Sidney, Kamloops, BC
- Jennifer Lyn Simpson, Woodstock, ON
- Lieutenant Ian Charles Steingaszner, Snowball, ON
- Andrew Wilder, Owen Sound, ON
- William Wood, Moncton, NB
- Christine Ann Armstrong, Winnipeg, MB
- Russell Grant Austin, Martensville, SK
- Richard Nevin Ball, St. Marys, ON
- Shannon-Lee Marlene Barry, Winnipeg, MB
- Captain Amy Lynn Belbin, Brockville, ON
- Darrel Francis Forbes Brown, Winnipeg, MB
- Major Steven Mark Daniel, Yellowknife, NT
- Glenys Deanna May Dlugosch, Mount Pearl, NL
- Noreen Flynn, Paradise, NL
- Anne Louise Grundy, Kingston, ON
- Raylene Marie Jonassen, Winnipeg, MB
- Deborah Anne Kelly, Windsor, ON
- Jennifer Kotsamanes, Cambridge, ON
- Armand Paul Labarge, Bethany, ON
- Renee Elizabeth McCormick, Sudbury, ON
- Judith McIlwaine, Bath, ON
- Brian Metcalfe, St. John's, NL
- Dawn Mohammed, Winnipeg, MB
- James Allan Osborn, Windsor, ON
- Darrell William Petite, Kingston, ON
- Larry Poulin-Carreau, Beauceville, QC
- Elizabeth Jean Purssell, Kingston, ON
- Debra Susan Roskam, Brandon, MB
- Cynthia Jean Russell, Cambridge, ON
- Malcolm Tinsley, Winnipeg, MB
- Joseph Bruce Varner, Ottawa, ON

=== Erratum ===
- The notice published on page 1963 of the June 25, 2011, issue of the Canada Gazette, Part I, is hereby amended as follows: Promotion as an Officers of the Order of St. John as of December 15, 2010, to Lieutenant-Colonel Daniel Richard Stepaniuk, CD, Dundas, ON

== Provincial Honours ==
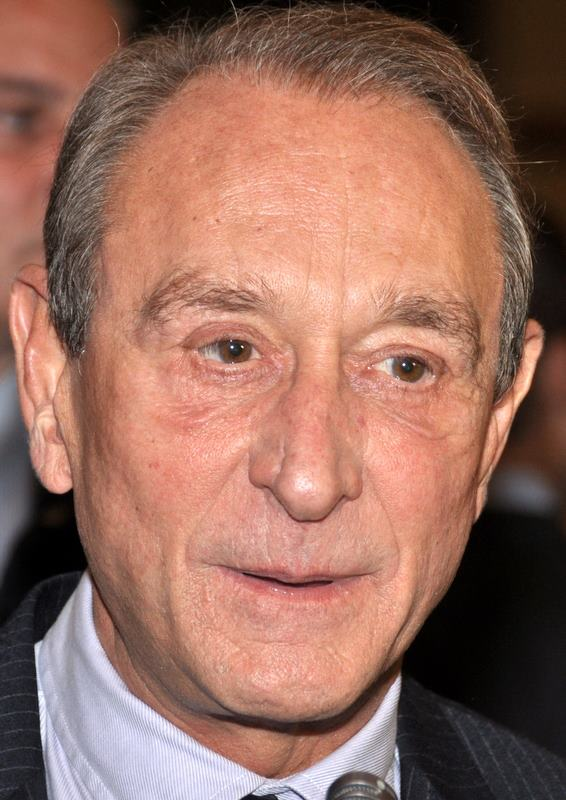
Bertrand Delanoë, Honorary Officer of the National Order of Québec

=== National Order of Québec ===
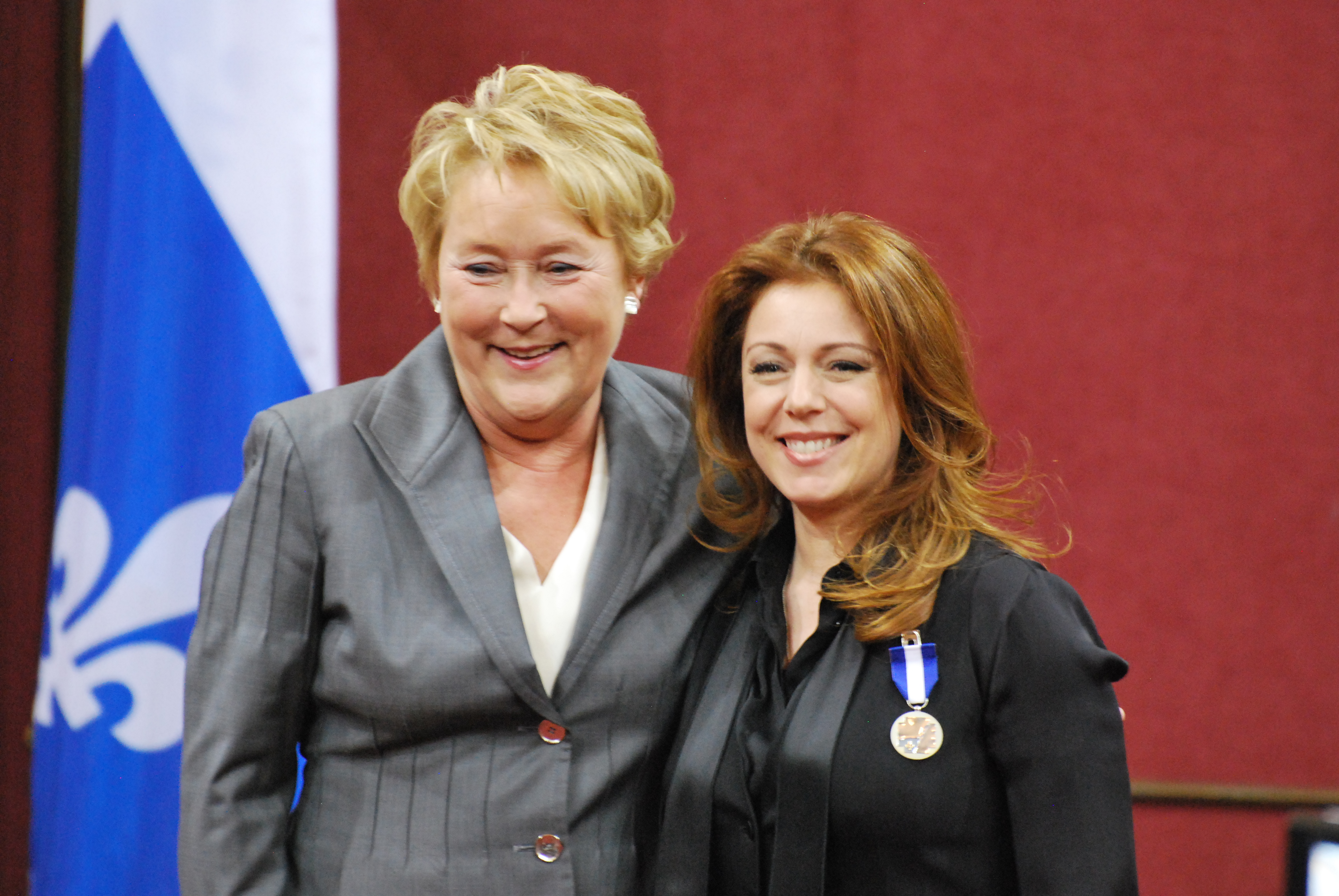
Then Premier of Québec, the (then) Honourable Pauline Marois, investing Isabelle Boulay as a Knight of the National Order of Québec

==== Grand Officers of the National Order of Québec ====
- JEAN-LOUIS BAUDOUIN, G.O.Q
- JACQUELINE DESMARAIS, G.O.Q

==== Officers of the National Order of Québec ====
- PIERRE BOURGIE, O.Q
- André Bureau, O.Q
- Daniel Gauthier, O.Q
- Bartha Knoppers, O.Q
- NANCY NEAMTAN, O.Q
- Béatrice Picard, O.Q
- JEAN-CLAUDE POITRAS, O.Q
- NORBERT RODRIGUE, O.Q
- Geneviève Salbaing, O.Q
- LOUIS TAILLEFER, O.Q
- MAURICE TANGUAY, O.Q

==== Honorary Officer of the National Order of Québec ====
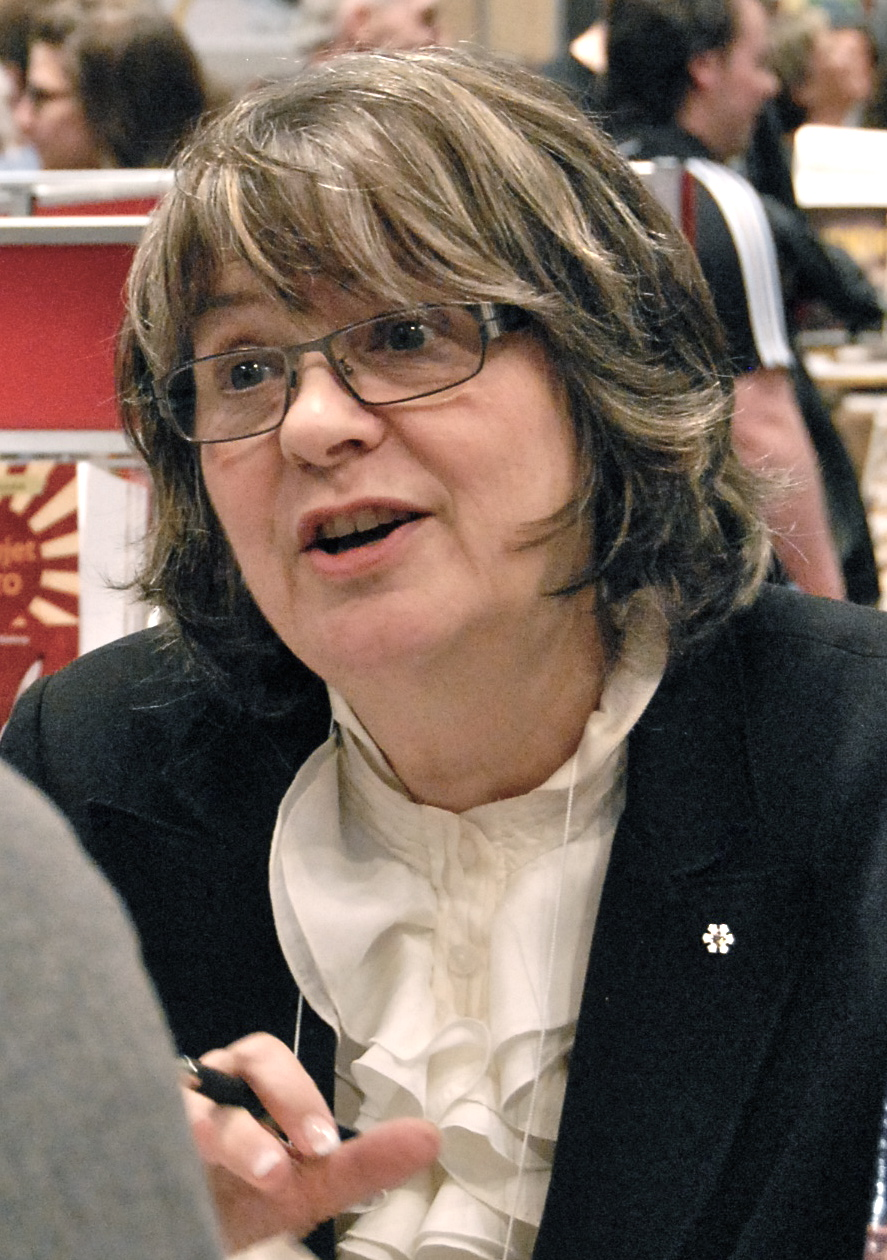
Arlette Cousture, Knight of the National Order of Québec

- Bertrand Delanoë, O.Q

==== Knight of the National Order of Québec ====
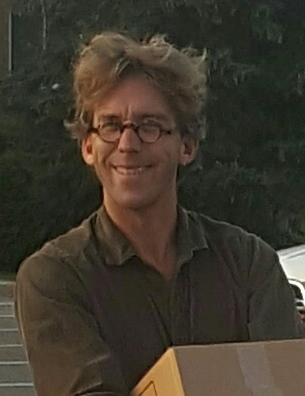
Storyteller Fred Pellerin, Knight of the National Order of Québec

- VINCENT ASSELIN, C.Q
- PATRICE BIRON, C.Q
- Michel Marc Bouchard, C.Q
- Isabelle Boulay, C.Q
- LOUISE CHAMPOUX-PAILLÉ, C.Q
- Arlette Cousture, C.Q
- Léonie Couture, C.Q
- GHISLAIN GAGNON, C.Q
- YVAN GUINDON, C.Q
- WAGDI GEORGE HABASHI, C.Q
- ACHILLE HUBERT, C.Q
- Jacques Joli-Cœur, C.Q
- GILLES KÈGLE, C.Q
- Jacques Lacombe, C.Q
- ANDRÉ LAURIN, C.Q
- Werner Nold, C.Q
- FRÉDÉRIC PELLERIN, C.Q
- CLAUDE VALLIÈRES, C.Q

=== Saskatchewan Order of Merit ===
Undress ribbon for a member of the Saskatchewan Order of Merit

==== Ex-Officio Member ====
- The Honourable Vaughn Solomon Schofield, S.O.M., S.V.M.

==== Ordinary members ====
- Raymond E. Ahenakew, S.O.M.
- Bruce W. Beatty, C.M., S.O.M., C.D. (1922- 2011) (posthumous)
- Sandra L. Birdsell, C.M., S.O.M.
- Dr. Barbara Keirnes Young, S.O.M.
- W. Thomas Molloy, O.C., S.O.M., Q.C., LL.B., LL.D.
- Dr. Brian G. Rossnagel, S.O.M.
- David A. Thauberger, C.M., S.O.M.
- W. Brett Wilson, C.M., S.O.M., LL.D

== Military Valour Decorations ==
=== Star of Military Valour ===
Undress ribbon for the Star of Military Valour

- PRIVATE TAUMY ST-HILAIRE, S.M.V.

=== Medal of Military Valour ===
Undress ribbon for the Medal of Military Valour

- CAPTAIN ASHLEY COLLETTE, M.M.V.
- SPECIALIST DAVID FLETCHER GRAVES, M.M.V., United States Army
- STAFF SERGEANT ADAM HEVER, M.M.V., United States Army
- CORPORAL ERIC MONNIN, M.M.V.
- MASTER CORPORAL CHARLES ST-PIERRE, M.M.V.
- LIEUTENANT GUILLAUME FRÉDÉRIC CARON, M.M.V., C.D.
- CORPORAL BRADLEY D. CASEY, M.M.V.
- CAPTAIN WILLIAM TODD FIELDING, M.M.V., C.D.
- PRIVATE TONY RODNEY VANCE HARRIS, M.M.V.
- MASTER CORPORAL ADAM HOLMES, M.M.V.
- CAPTAIN MICHAEL A. MACKILLOP, M.M.V., C.D.
- MASTER CORPORAL GILLES-REMI MIKKELSON, M.M.V.
- PRIVATE PHILIP MILLAR, M.M.V.
- MASTER CORPORAL PAUL DOUGLAS MITCHELL, M.M.V.
- PRIVATE JOHN NELSON, M.M.V.
- MASTER CORPORAL MARC-ANDRÉ J. M. ROUSSEAU, M.M.V.
- SERGEANT GRAHAM MARC VERRIER, M.M.V., C.D.

== Canadian Bravery Decorations ==
=== Star of Courage ===
Undress ribbon for the Star of Courage

- Corporal Joseph Martin Éric Beaudoin, C.D.
- Simon Bernier
- Marcel Bouffard
- Sergeant Randal Douglas McOrmond, C.D.
- Master Corporal Robin Anthony Richardson, C.D.
- Constable David Edgar
- Marc Fortier (Posthumous)
- Corporal Winston William Matheson, C.D.
- Constable Clayton Speers

=== Medal of Bravery ===
Undress ribbon for the Medal of Bravery

- David Edison Adams
- Constable Jennifer Elizabeth Anderson
- Jordan Adam Appleby
- Réal April
- Sergio Avaca
- Judith Gayle Barker
- Jason Bavelaar Jr.
- Master Corporal Christian Pierre Jonathan Bédard
- Pascal Bergeron
- Darrell Black
- Michael Black
- Bernard Joseph Blanchard
- Constable Jean-Pierre Brabant
- Justin Ashley Byrne
- Daniel Chrusch
- Constable Shaun Nicholas De Grandpré
- Provincial Constable Ken Leon Decloet
- Anthony Del Balso
- Kole Gerard Devisscher
- Adlene Fetni
- Vincent Bradley Fontaine
- Dwight Stephen Foster
- Michael Foster
- Sébastien Gilbert
- Daniel Glanville
- Jules Groulx-Swennen
- Philip Hall
- Doctor Ursula Higgins
- Gisèle Huot (posthumous)
- Constable Guillaume Jacques
- Raphaëlle Jetté
- Brent Kirchner
- Corporal Dale M. Kurdziel
- Aline L'Écuyer Lacroix
- Benoit Ladouceur
- Guillaume Langlois
- Claude Lapierre
- Tim Leclair
- Jeffery Thomas Ray Lennox
- Reno Levesque
- Peter Levy
- Russell Levy
- Gian Frank Mameli
- Eric Michael McAdam Manget
- Sergeant James Wesley McLaren
- Corporal Daniel Richard Melanson
- Birunthan Muralidaran (posthumous)
- Alexander Peter David Nassak
- Sergeant François Paquette
- Peter Edward Paquette
- Bruce Wayne Raymond
- David Rego
- Sergeant Scott Wesley Rempel
- Cynthia Louise Riediger (posthumous)
- Constable Simon Rivard
- Candace Irene Dawn Smith
- Doctor Kenneth W. Sniderman
- Daniel Sokolowski
- Constable Mark Tan
- Constable Mansoor Ahmad
- Paul George Akehurst
- Lauchlin Henry Alexander Armstrong
- John-Paul Bacon
- Lieutenant(N) André D. Bard, C.D.
- Joe Barefoot
- Éric Beaulieu
- Constable Sandi Joanne Begg
- Tyler Bell-Morena
- François Bergeron
- Paul Bergeron
- Michel Bérubé
- Darren Jason Bieber
- Constable Michael Allan Biron
- Freddy Borau
- James Joseph Bourgeois
- Eldred Burden Jr.
- Corporal Joseph Léandre Mickaël Couture
- Constable Peter C. Crouse
- Leading Seaman David J. S. Denman
- Constable Karen Mary Desaulniers
- Yves Ducharme
- Richard Dufresne
- Alexandre Duperré
- Constable Michel Durocher
- Chief Warrant Officer Anthony Eric Fequet, C.D. (Retired)
- Sergeant Lorraine Fequet, C.D.
- Constable Avery Curt Flanagan
- Warrant Officer Marc Joseph Fortin, C.D. (Retired)
- Detective Constable Bradley William Fraser
- Sergeant Kent James Gulliford, M.S.M., C.D.
- Patrick Grondin
- Michael John Hancock (Posthumous)
- Ernest John Herrfort
- Jonathan Hillgren
- Mark Arthur Janke
- Kevin I. Jelley-Kasper
- Chad Khadr
- Corporal Tamer Mahmoud Khadr
- Gunter Lambeets
- Christopher Larkham
- Tyler Ross Laton
- Christian Leblond
- Jonathan Yvan Leblond
- Daniel Magny
- Dawn Rene Manning
- Michel Massé
- Jeff Sean McCarthy
- William John McKeag
- Jeremy Francis Michelin
- Leading Seaman Patrick S. Moulden, C.D.
- Constable David Murtha
- Peter Nesbeth
- Constable Allen George Percival
- Jason William Phillips
- Constable Franco D. Pittui
- Wayne Pruden
- Constable Lindsy Richardson
- Master Corporal Daniel Edward Gilles Rochette, C.D.
- Sergeant Stéphane Réal Joseph Roy, C.D.
- George Cosmin Rusu
- Major Ryan Dennis Smid, C.D.
- Yves Soumillion
- Colleen Taylor
- David Wilbert Townsend
- Jacqueline Lorraine Vanderwood
- Constable Daryl Whitten
- Ronald Earl Walton

== Meritorious Service Decorations ==
=== Meritorious Service Cross (Military Division) ===
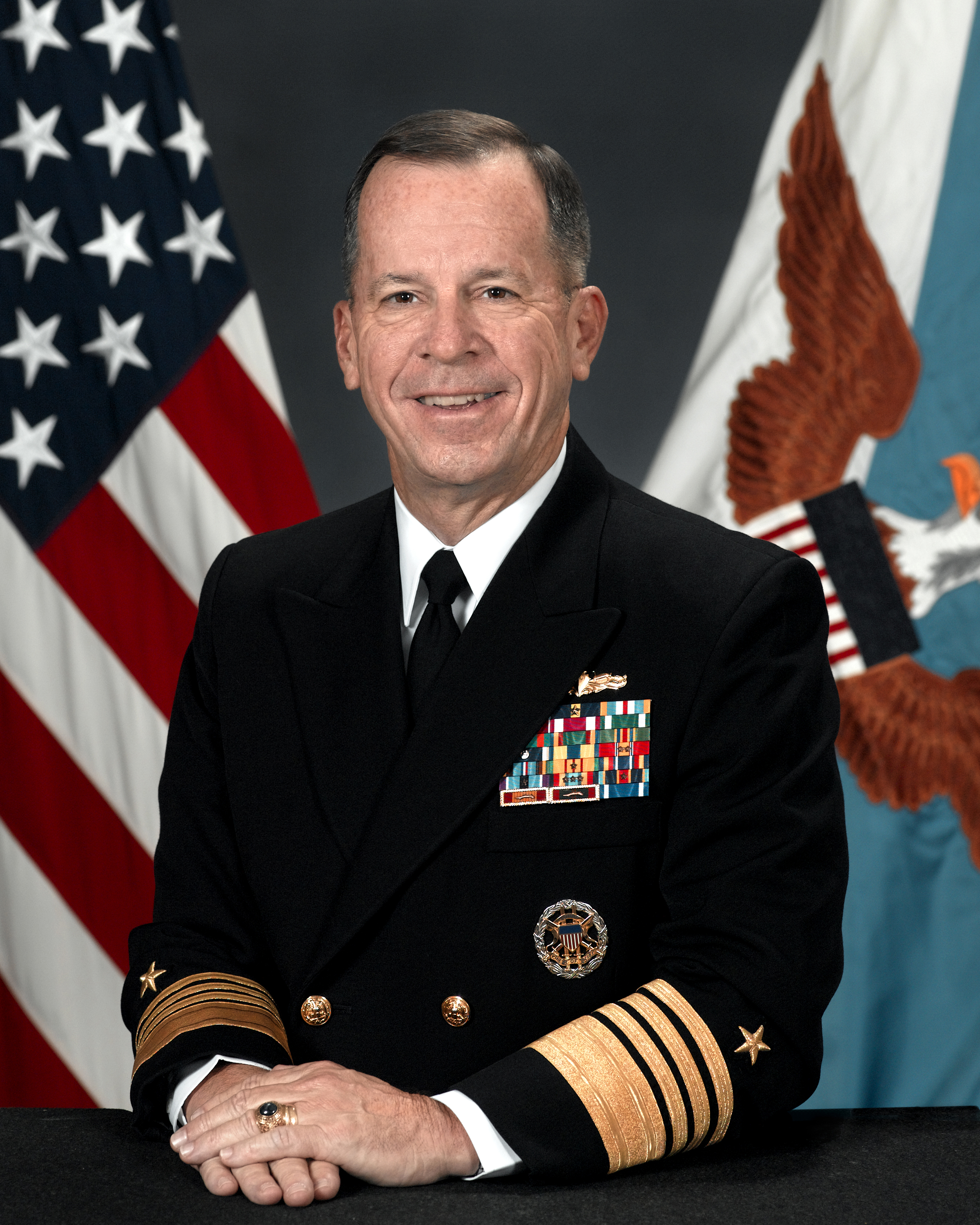
Admiral Michael Gleen Mullen, AO, recipient of the Meritorious Service Cross

- BRIGADIER-GENERAL KENNETH ANDRÉ CORBOULD, O.M.M., M.S.C., C.D.
- COLONEL DEAN JAMES MILNER, O.M.M., M.S.C., C.D.
- BRIGADIER-GENERAL CRAIG RANDALL KING, O.M.M., M.S.C., C.D., M.B.E.
- LIEUTENANT-COLONEL CONRAD JOSEPH JOHN MIALKOWSKI, M.S.C., C.D.
- BRIGADIER-GENERAL DAVID GORDON NEASMITH, O.M.M., M.S.C., C.D.
- MAJOR-GENERAL MICHAEL JAMES WARD, M.S.C., C.D.

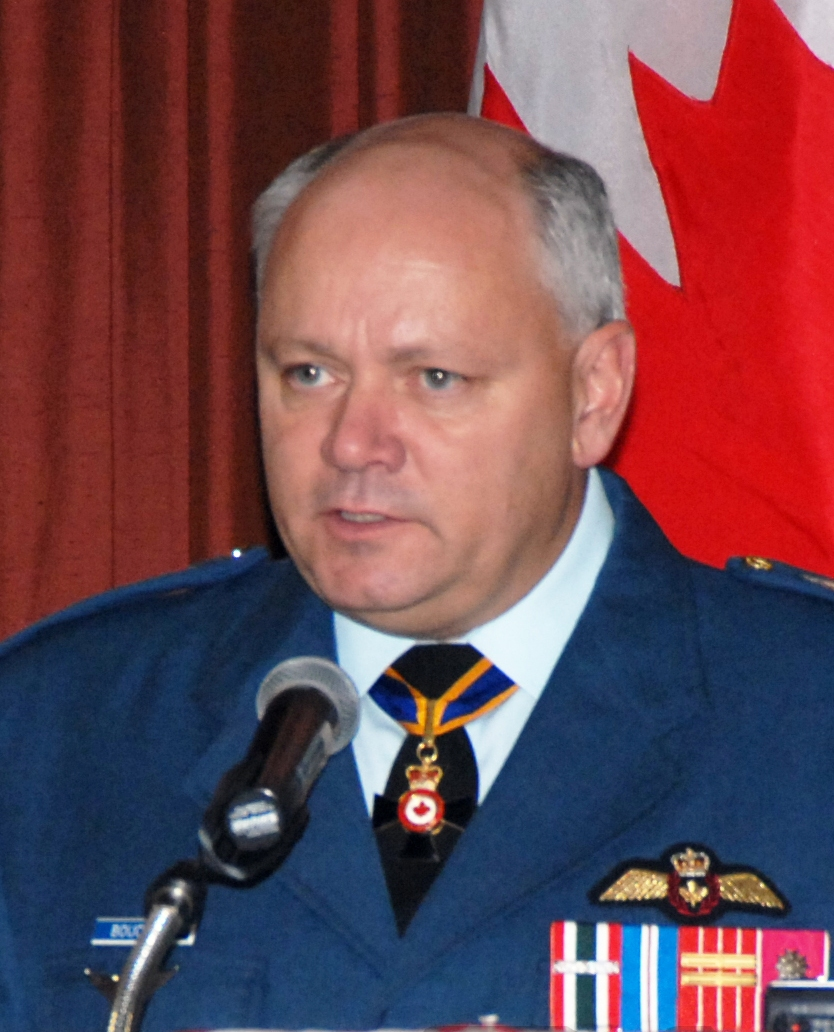
Lieutenant General Joseph Jacques Charles Bouchard, recipeant of the Meritorious Service Cross

- LIEUTENANT-GENERAL JOSEPH JACQUES CHARLES BOUCHARD, C.M.M., M.S.C., C.D.
- COLONEL CHRISTIAN DROUIN, M.S.C., C.D.

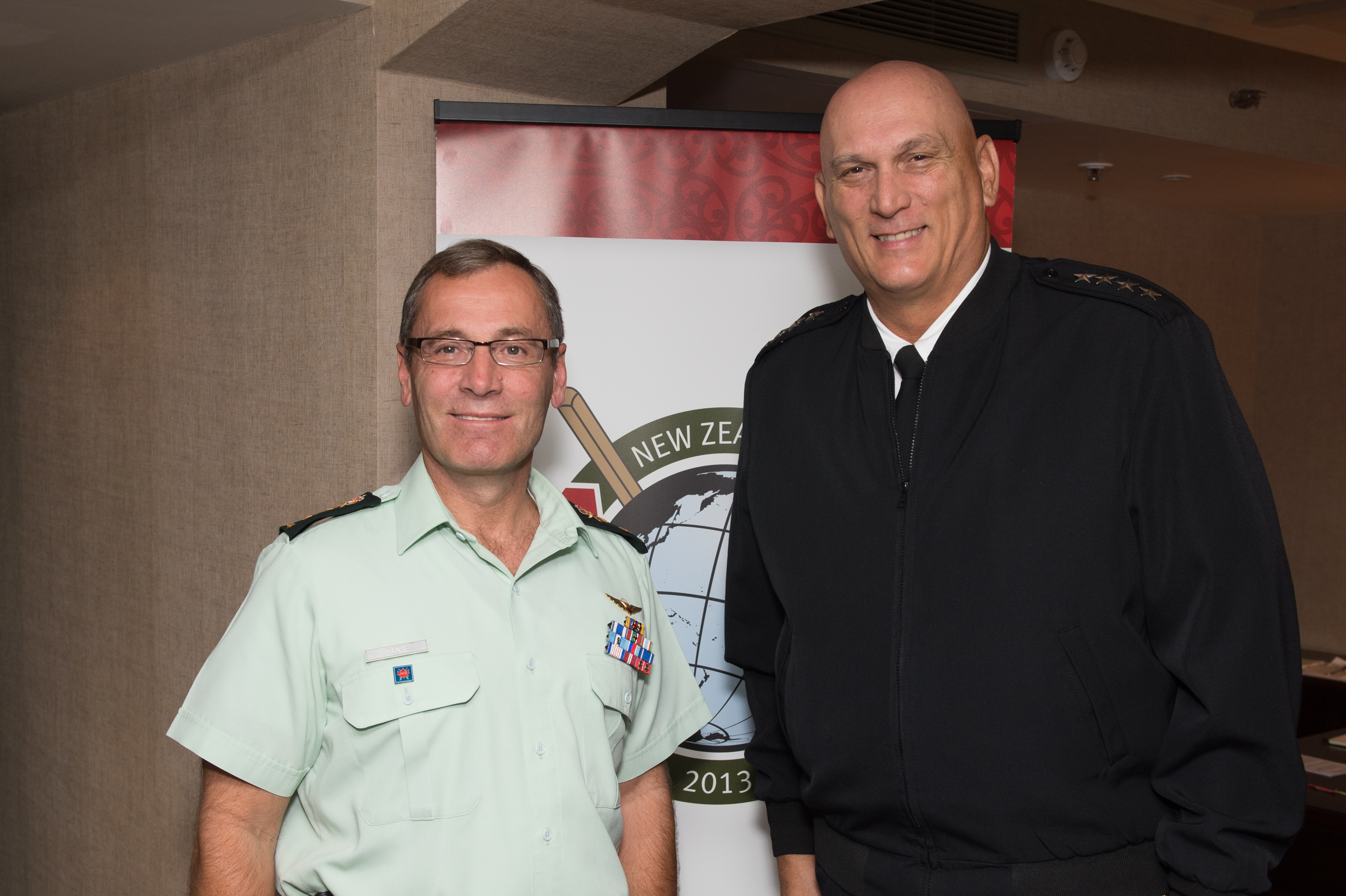
Lieutenant-General Marquis Hainse, recipient of the Meritorious Service Cross

- BRIGADIER-GENERAL JOSEPH MARCEL MARQUIS HAINSE, M.S.C., C.D.
- COLONEL SIMON CHARLES HETHERINGTON, M.S.C., C.D.
- ADMIRAL MICHAEL GLENN MULLEN, M.S.C. (United States Navy)
- CHIEF WARRANT OFFICER SHAWN DOUGLAS STEVENS, M.S.C., M.S.M., C.D.

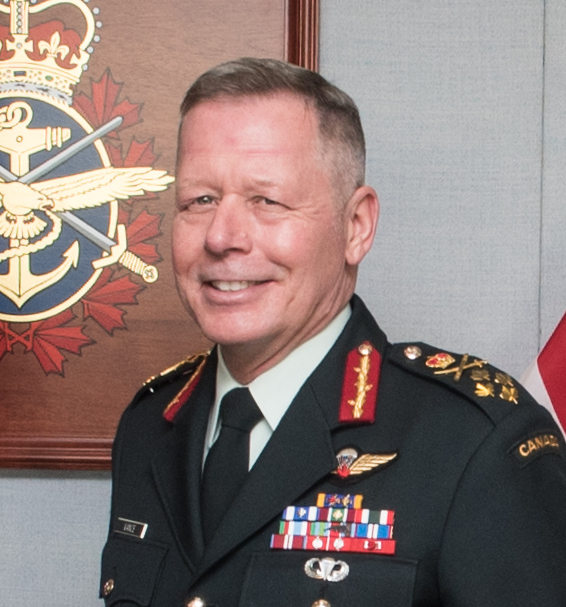
General Joseph Jonathan Vance, recipient of the Meritorious Service Cross

- BRIGADIER-GENERAL JONATHAN HOLBERT VANCE, O.M.M., M.S.C., C.D.
- CHIEF WARRANT OFFICER JOSEPH SIMON ARMAND VINET, M.M.M., M.S.C., C.D.
- LIEUTENANT-COLONEL FRANCIS JEROME WALSH, M.S.C., C.D.

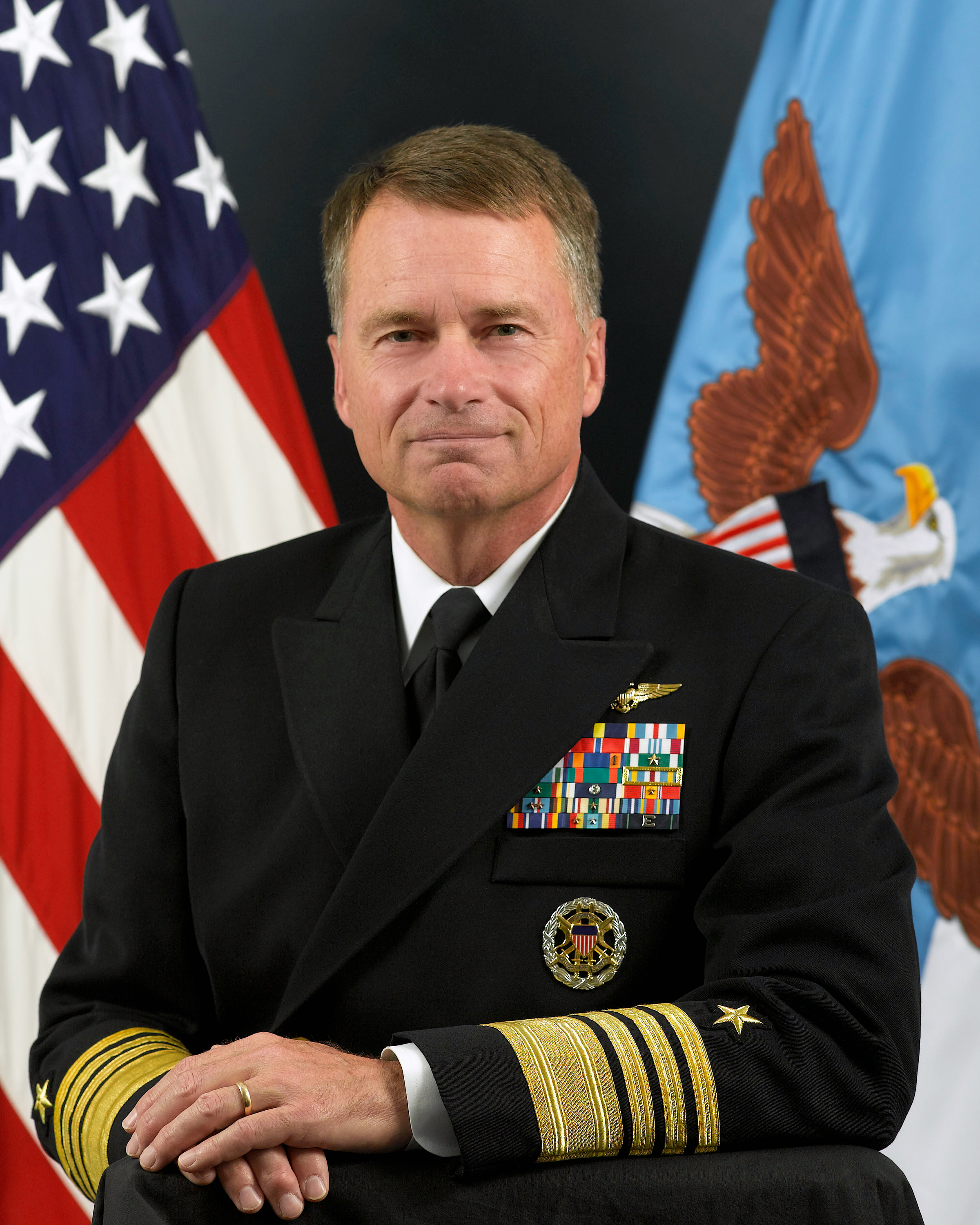
Admiral James Alexander "Sandy" Winnefeld Jr., recipient of the Meritorious Service Cross

- ADMIRAL JAMES ALEXANDER WINNEFELD, JR., M.S.C. (United States Navy)

=== Meritorious Service Medal (Military Division) ===
- SERGEANT JOSEPH CLAUDE PATRICK AUGER, M.S.M., C.D.
- CHIEF WARRANT OFFICER JOSEPH MARIO CLAUDE BELCOURT, M.M.M., M.S.M., C.D.
- COLONEL GÉRARD JOSEPH BLAIS, M.S.M., C.D.
- LIEUTENANT-COLONEL DAVID BRUCE COCHRANE, M.S.M., C.D.
- MASTER WARRANT OFFICER JOSEPH YVON PRUDENT CLAUDE DALLAIRE, M.S.M., C.D.
- MAJOR RAYMOND JEAN FRANÇOIS DUFAULT, M.S.M., C.D.
- LIEUTENANT-COLONEL JOHN WILLIAM ERRINGTON, M.S.M., C.D.
- HONORARY CAPTAIN(N) THE HONOURABLE MYRA AVA FREEMAN, C.M., O.N.S., M.S.M.
- MAJOR ÉTIENNE JOSEPH ROBERT CLAUDE GAUTHIER, M.S.M., C.D.
- COLONEL RICHARD JOSEPH GIGUÈRE, M.S.M., C.D.
- CORPORAL HOPE GINGRICH, M.S.M.
- COLONEL JOSEPH PIERRE HERVÉ HERCULE GOSSELIN, M.S.M., C.D.
- CHIEF WARRANT OFFICER JOSEPH LUCIEN ÉRIC GRAVEL, M.M.M., M.S.M., C.D.
- CHIEF WARRANT OFFICER ALAIN GRENIER, M.M.M., M.S.M., C.D.
- LIEUTENANT-COMMANDER AARON GYORKOS, M.S.M., C.D.
- MAJOR JOSEPH ANTONIO MARCEL LOUIS HAMEL, M.S.M., C.D.
- COLONEL JEFFREY ALLEN HAUSMANN, M.S.M., United States Air Force
- COMMANDER SIMON RUPERT HUGHES, M.S.M., C.D.
- LIEUTENANT-COMMANDER STEWART THOMAS HUGHES, M.S.M., C.D.
- LIEUTENANT-COLONEL ROBERT EDWARD KEARNEY, M.S.M., C.D.
- COLONEL PATRICK KELLY, M.S.M., C.D.
- MAJOR JEAN ÉRIC LANDRY, M.S.M., C.D.
- WARRANT OFFICER DANIEL PIUS MANSFIELD, M.S.M., C.D.
- MAJOR JEAN-CHRISTIAN MARQUIS, M.S.M., C.D.
- MAJOR CHRISTOPHER ALAN MCKENNA, M.S.M., C.D.
- MAJOR-GENERAL CHRISTOPHER D. MILLER, M.S.M., United States Air Force
- WARRANT OFFICER DAVID ELWELL MILLIGAN, M.S.M., C.D.
- CAPTAIN JOSEPH GUY NOURY, M.S.M., C.D.
- MASTER CORPORAL MARTIN JOSEPH ANDRÉ PELLETIER, M.S.M.
- COLONEL JACQUES PAUL ROBERT PRÉVOST, M.S.M., C.D.
- CAPTAIN(N) ALEXANDER FRANZ GEORG RUEBEN, M.S.M., C.D.
- CORPORAL SCOTT SCHOLTEN, M.S.M., C.D.
- LIEUTENANT-COLONEL ÉRICK DAVID SIMONEAU, M.S.M., C.D.
- LIEUTENANT-COLONEL MASON JAMES STALKER, M.S.M., C.D.
- LIEUTENANT-COLONEL MICHEL-HENRI ST-LOUIS, M.S.M., C.D.
- MAJOR RICHARD CIMON TURNER, M.S.M., C.D.
- COLONEL SIEGFRIED USAL, M.S.M., French Air Force
- CHIEF WARRANT OFFICER KEVIN CHARLES WEST, M.S.M., C.D.
- LIEUTENANT-COLONEL CHRISTOPHER JOHN ZIMMER, M.S.M., C.D.
- MAJOR DEREK JOHN ADAMS, M.S.M., C.D.
- MAJOR JOSEPH AIMÉ DANIEL AUGER, M.S.M., C.D.
- LIEUTENANT-COLONEL MALCOLM DAVID BRUCE, M.S.M., C.D.
- SERGEANT YANNICK CAMPBELL, M.S.M., C.D.

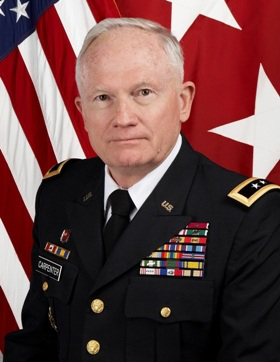
Major-General Raymond W. Carpenter, recipient of the Meritorious Service Medal

- MAJOR GENERAL RAYMOND CARPENTER, M.S.M., United States Army National Guard
- COLONEL MICHAEL PEARSON CESSFORD, O.M.M., M.S.M., C.D.
- MASTER WARRANT OFFICER JOSEPH GUY ALAIN RICHMOND CHAMPAGNE, M.S.M., C.D.
- MAJOR MICHAEL JAMES COLE, M.S.M., C.D.
- COLONEL IAN ROBERT CREIGHTON, M.S.M., C.D.
- SERGEANT GORDON PERCY CULLEN, M.S.M., C.D.
- CAPTAIN CHRISTOPHER GLEN CYR, M.S.M.
- MAJOR AUSTIN MATTHEW DOUGLAS, M.S.M., C.D.
- SERGEANT SCOTT WILLIAM DUFFY, M.S.M., C.D.
- WARRANT OFFICER MARC CHARLES JOSEPH FILIATRAULT, M.S.M., C.D.
- CORPORAL JOY FRANCIS, M.S.M.
- MAJOR DOUGLAS ANDREW GRANT, M.S.M., C.D.
- MAJOR STEVE JOURDAIN, M.S.M., C.D.
- COLONEL FREDERICK LEWIS, M.S.M., C.D.
- LIEUTENANT-COLONEL SCOTT GERARD LONG, M.S.M., C.D.
- CAPTAIN VINCENT LUSSIER, M.S.M.
- MAJOR HEATHER JOY MACCHARLES, M.S.M., C.D.
- LIEUTENANT-COLONEL TIMOTHY DAVID MARCELLA, M.S.M., C.D.
- HONORARY LIEUTENANT-COLONEL JAMES WILLIAM MARTIN, M.S.M., C.D.
- COLONEL JOHN GERARD MILNE, M.S.M., C.D.
- MAJOR JEFFREY KARL MONAGHAN, M.S.M., C.D.
- CHIEF WARRANT OFFICER KIRK NEWHOOK, M.S.M., C.D.
- MAJOR STEPHEN NOEL, M.S.M., C.D.
- LIEUTENANT-COLONEL PAUL JAMES PEYTON, M.S.M., C.D.
- LIEUTENANT-COLONEL JOSEPH RAYNALD YAN POIRIER, M.S.M., C.D.
- MASTER CORPORAL JEFFREY QUESNELLE, M.S.M.
- CORPORAL COREY SAGSTUEN, M.S.M., C.D.
- CAPTAIN MARK SAVARD, M.S.M.
- SERGEANT MICHEL SIMONEAU, M.S.M., C.D.
- CHIEF WARRANT OFFICER KEVIN PETER SINDEN, M.S.M., C.D.

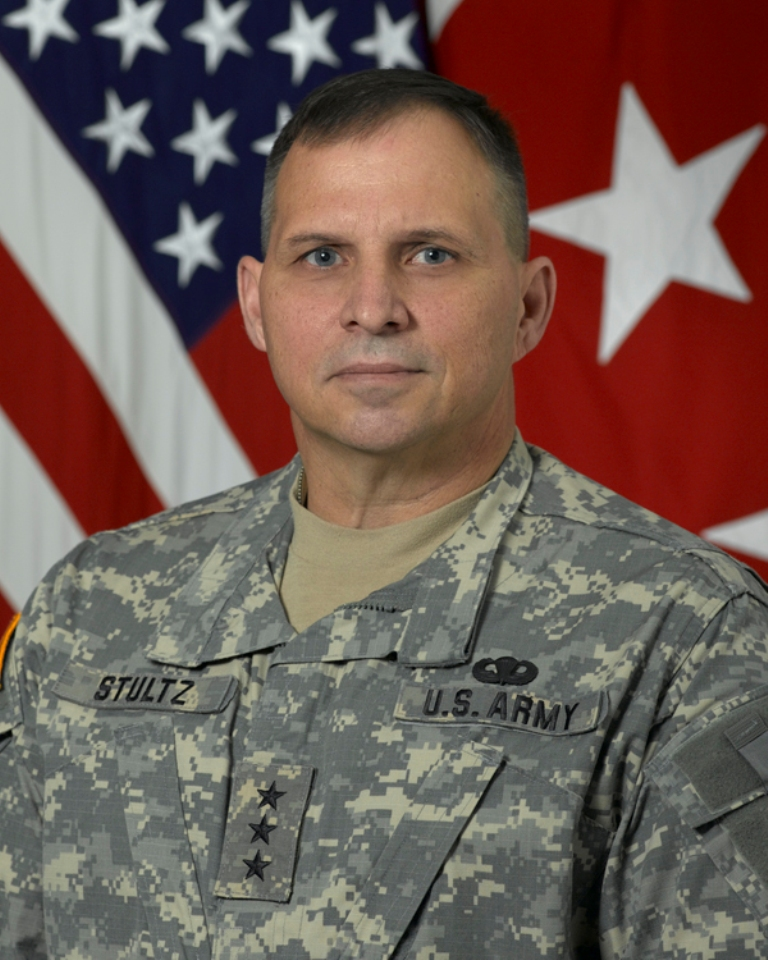
Lieutenant General Jack C. Stultz, Jr., recipient of the Meritorious Service Medal

- LIEUTENANT-GENERAL JACK CALVIN STULTZ, M.S.M., United States Army Reserve
- MAJOR ELEANOR FRANCES TAYLOR, M.S.M., C.D.
- LIEUTENANT CHAD THAIN, M.S.M.
- SERGEANT KEVIN DONALD SCOTT WHITE, M.S.M., C.D.
- LIEUTENANT-COLONEL RONALD ALLAN ALLISON, M.S.M., C.D.
- COLONEL DAVID EDWARD BARR, M.S.M., C.D.
- MAJOR ANNIE BOUCHARD, M.S.M., C.D.
- MASTER CORPORAL DANNY DENIS BOYD, M.S.M., C.D.
- COLONEL SHANE ANTHONY BRENNAN, M.S.M., C.D.
- MASTER WARRANT OFFICER RAYMOND JOSEPH BRODEUR, M.S.M., C.D.
- CORPORAL BOBBY BROWN, M.S.M.
- LIEUTENANT-COLONEL KENNETH FREEMAN BUTTERWORTH, M.S.M., C.D.
- LIEUTENANT-COLONEL MARIE ANNABELLE JENNIE CARIGNAN, M.S.M., C.D.
- CAPTAIN BREEN CARSON, M.S.M.
- LIEUTENANT-COLONEL DAVID BRUCE COCHRANE, M.S.M., C.D.
- CORPORAL ERIC DANIEL DIONNE, M.S.M.
- COLONEL JAMES ROY FORESTELL, M.S.M., C.D.
- WARRANT OFFICER JOSEPH JACQUES FRIOLET, M.S.M., C.D.
- COLONEL RAYMOND MARC GAGNÉ, M.S.M., C.D.
- LIEUTENANT-COMMANDER LOUIS CHRISTIAN HACHÉ, M.S.M., C.D.
- CAPTAIN(N) RICHARD PHILIP HARRISON, O.M.M., M.S.M., C.D.
- COLONEL JEFFREY HOLACHEK, M.S.M.
- MAJOR JAY LYMAN INDEWEY, M.S.M., C.D.
- MAJOR MICHAEL KAISER, M.S.M., C.D.
- CAPTAIN ENNO ALEXANDER KERCKHOFF, M.S.M., C.D.
- MASTER WARRANT OFFICER RENÉ KIENS, M.S.M., C.D.
- MAJOR PATRICK JOHN KOCH, M.S.M., C.D.
- LIEUTENANT-COLONEL DAVID WILLIAM LOWTHIAN, M.S.M., C.D.
- MAJOR STEVEN KELLY MACBETH, M.S.M., C.D.
- MAJOR JOSHUA JAMES MAJOR, M.S.M., C.D.
- MASTER WARRANT OFFICER KEVIN JAMES MATHERS, M.S.M., C.D.
- LIEUTENANT-COLONEL THOMAS FREDERICK MCGRATH, O.M.M., M.S.M., C.D.
- CAPTAIN JAMES HUGH MCKAY, M.S.M.
- SERGEANT KEVIN MENDIOROZ, M.S.M., C.D.
- MAJOR LEE JAMES MOSSOP, M.S.M., C.D.
- LIEUTENANT-COLONEL DAVID CHRISTOPHER MURPHY, M.S.M., C.D.
- CAPTAIN(N) JOHN FREDERICK NEWTON, M.S.M., C.D.
- MAJOR WAYNE KENNETH NIVEN, M.S.M., C.D.
- LIEUTENANT ANDREW RICHARD NUTTALL, M.S.M. (Posthumous)
- CAPTAIN JAMES ALAN O'NEILL, M.S.M., C.D.
- WARRANT OFFICER STEEVE OUELLET, M.S.M., C.D.
- WARRANT OFFICER GEORGE NELSON PARROTT, M.S.M., C.D.
- LIEUTENANT-COLONEL MICHAEL BRIAN PATRICK, M.S.M., C.D.
- CAPTAIN(N) KENNETH JOHN PICKFORD, M.S.M., C.D.
- MASTER WARRANT OFFICER DEAN EDWARD POFFLEY, M.S.M., C.D.
- MAJOR DEREK PROHAR, M.M.V., M.S.M.
- CHIEF WARRANT OFFICER JOSEPH CAMILLE ROBICHAUD, M.S.M., C.D.
- MAJOR LIAM WADE RUTLAND, M.S.M., C.D.
- CORPORAL JOHN TOMMY SALOIS, M.S.M.
- LIEUTENANT-COLONEL ANDREW SCHEIDL, M.S.M., C.D.
- CAPTAIN ROBERT SCOTT, M.S.M.
- MAJOR DONALD JAMES SENFT, M.S.M., C.D.
- LIEUTENANT-COLONEL JEFFERY DOUGLAS SMYTH, M.S.M., C.D.
- HONORARY COLONEL GARY CHRIS SOLAR, M.S.M., C.D.
- CHIEF PETTY OFFICER 2ND CLASS DAVID SYDNEY TOBIAS, M.S.M., C.D.
- CAPTAIN KRISTIAN UDESEN, M.S.M.
- COMMANDER STEVEN MICHAEL WADDELL, M.S.M., C.D.
- CAPTAIN(N) CRAIG WALKINGTON, M.S.M., C.D.
- SERGEANT AUSTIN KANE WILLIAMS, M.S.M.
- BRIGADIER-GENERAL PAUL FRANCIS WYNNYK, O.M.M., M.S.M., C.D.
- BRIGADIER-GENERAL GREGORY ACHILLES YOUNG, O.M.M., M.S.M., C.D.

=== Secret appointments ===
- 4 August 2012: Nine others whose names are withheld for operational and security reasons.

== Mentions in Dispatches ==
- Corporal Daniel Albrecht
- Master Warrant Officer Timothy Alfred Bennett, C.D.
- Major Steven Gary Brown, C.D.
- Master Corporal Joel Douglas Chidley
- Master Corporal Jason Clark, C.D.
- Private Joshua Clouston
- Sergeant Gareth Davey, C.D.
- Master Seaman Marc Robert Essertaize, C.D.
- Master Corporal Devon Hatcher
- Corporal Christopher Hinds
- Warrant Officer John Charles Hryniw, C.D.
- Corporal Stephan Leblanc, C.D.
- Major Christian Donald Lillington, C.D.
- Master Corporal John Lougheed
- Captain Adam Mramor
- Private Valerie Noel
- Private Christopher Palubicki
- Master Warrant Officer Kenneth Thomas Joseph Pichie, C.D.
- Private Kirk Powell
- Warrant Officer Paul Maurice Primeau, C.D.
- Corporal Christopher Roy
- Corporal Richard Stewart
- Master Corporal Martin Amyot
- Corporal Joshua Antonia
- Captain Breen Carson
- Corporal Neil Dancer
- Corporal Andrew Paul Downer
- Master Corporal Evan Duff
- Sergeant Patrick Michael Farrell, C.D.
- Private Kirk Farrell
- Corporal Joseph Don Henry
- Corporal Shaun Hofer
- Major Robert Mathew Hume, C.D.
- Sergeant Jedd Michael Lafleche
- Sergeant James Ray Brent Martin, C.D.
- Master Corporal Ian R. Matthews-Pestana
- Master Corporal Stuart Douglas Murray, C.D.
- Corporal Christopher Joseph Novak
- Lieutenant Brian Riddell
- Corporal Corey Sagstuen, C.D.
- Warrant Officer Lawrence Jeffrey Schnurr, C.D.
- Sergeant Michel Simoneau, C.D.
- Master Corporal Jayson Swift
- Lieutenant Matthew Tompkins

=== Secret appointment ===
- 11 February 2012: One other whose name is withheld for operational and security reasons.
- 4 August 2012: One other whose name is withheld for operational and security reasons.

== Commonwealth and Foreign Orders, Decorations and Medal awarded to Canadians ==
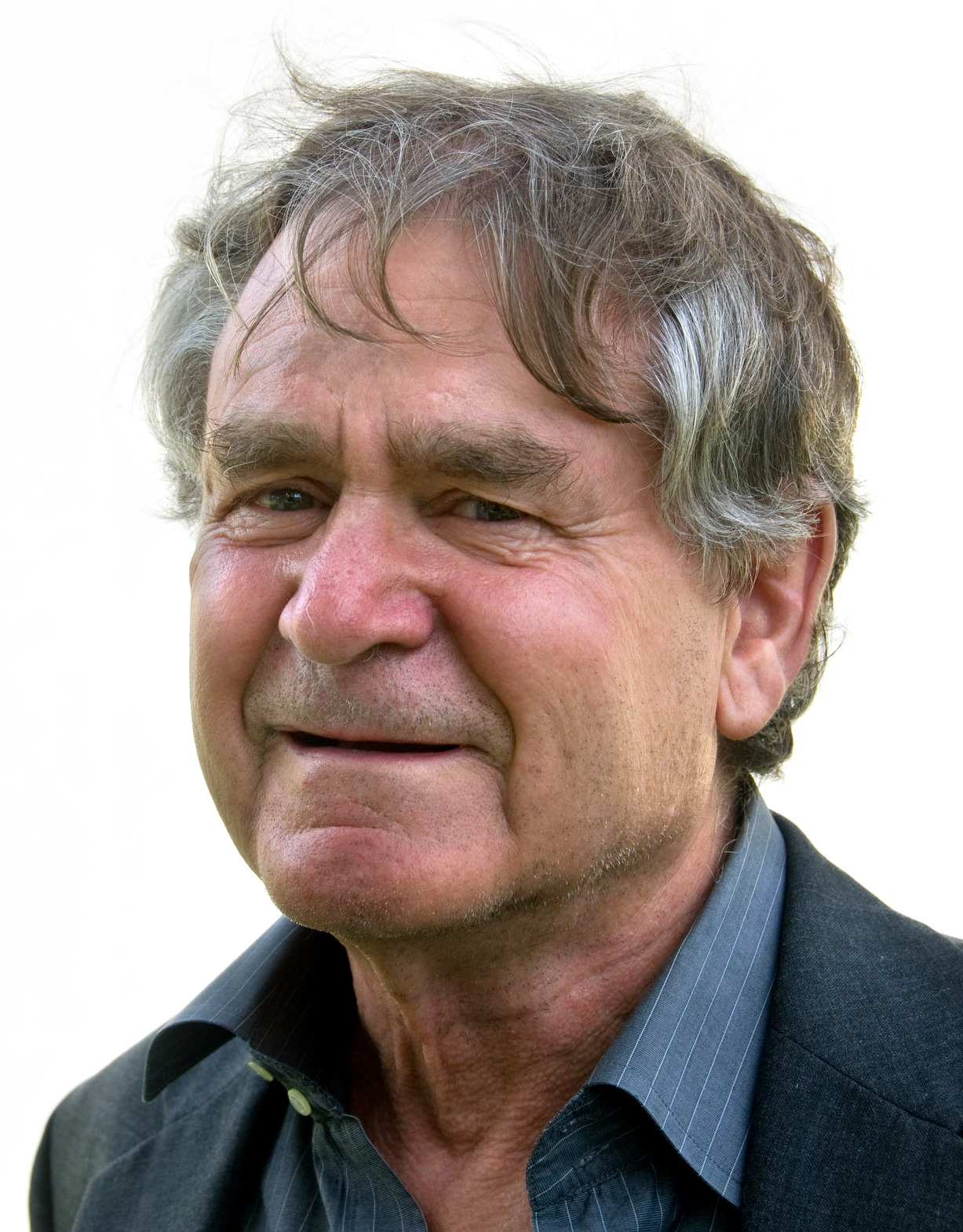
Ian MacDougall Hacking, CC, FRSC, FBA, recipient of the Austrian Decoration for Science and Art

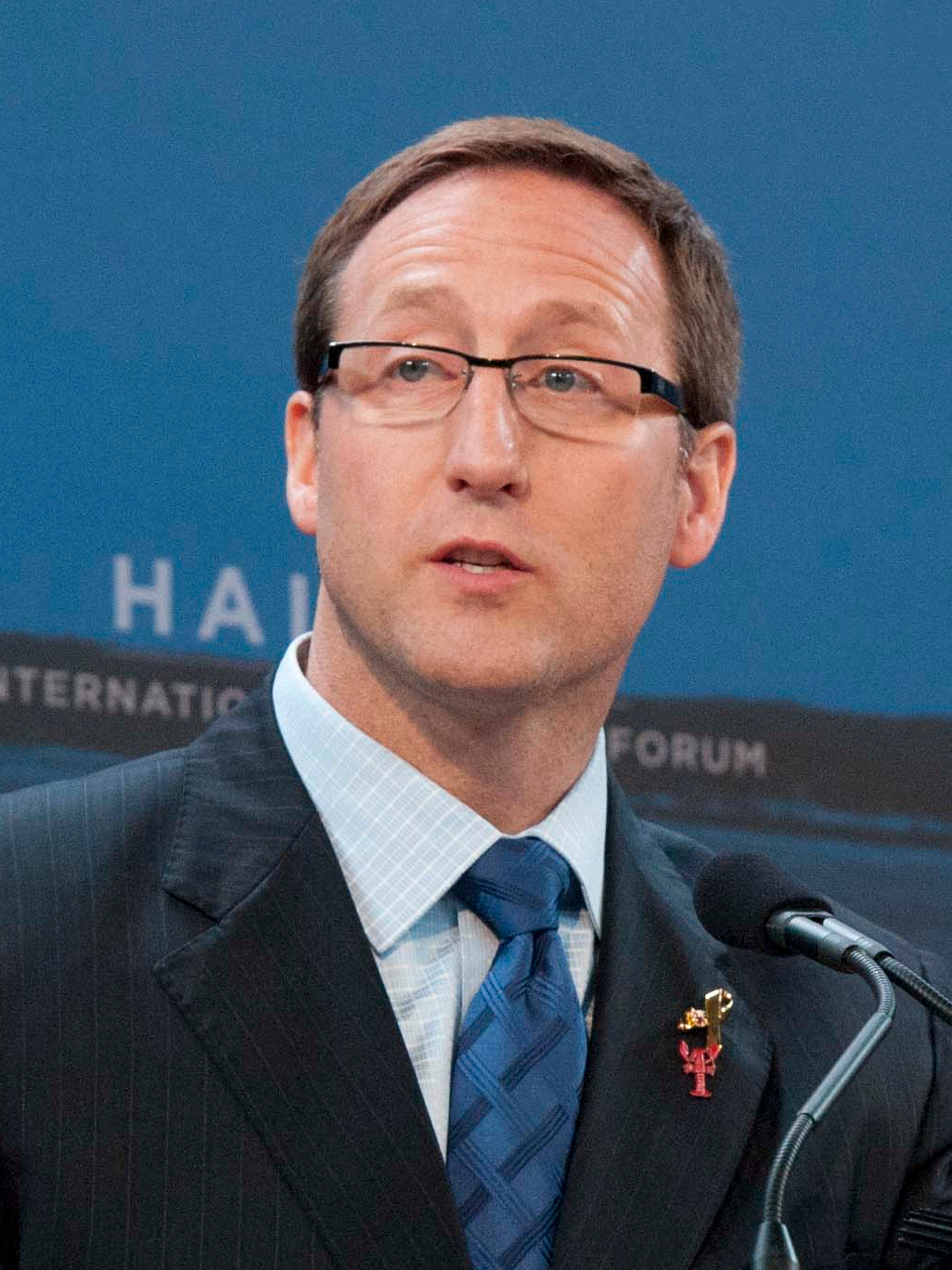
The Honourable Peter MacKay, PC, QC, recipient of the Belgian Grand Officer of the Order of the Crown

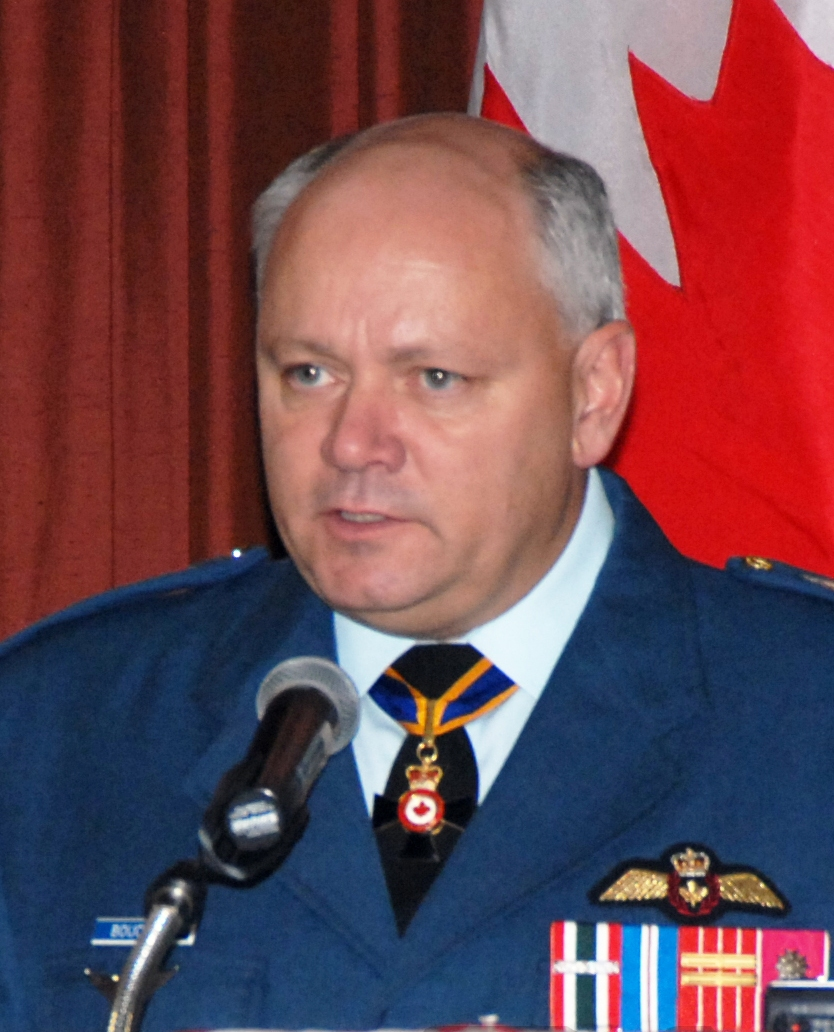
Lieutenant General Joseph Jacques Charles Bouchard, recipeant of the Meritorious Service Cross

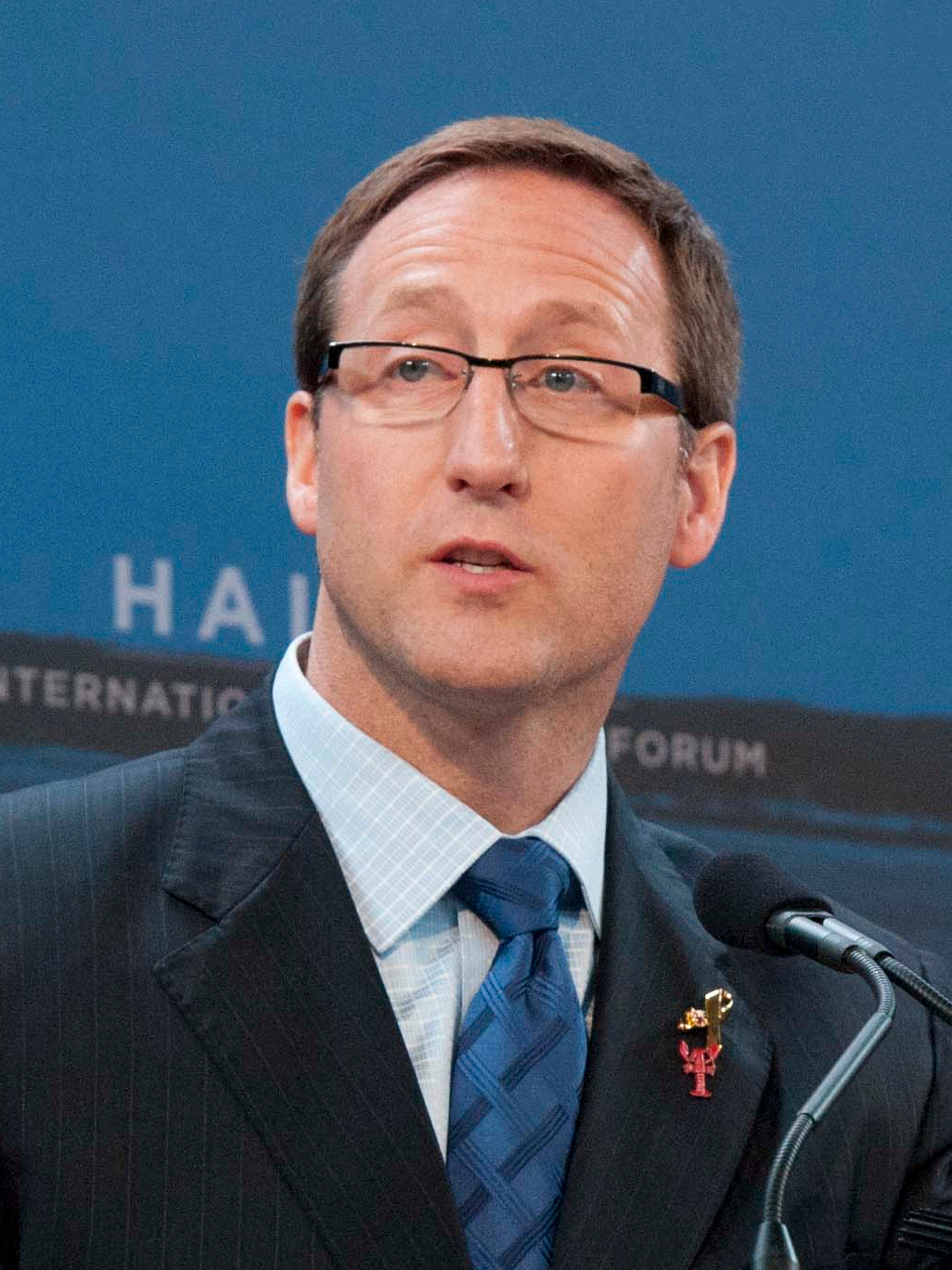
The Honourable Peter MacKay, PC, QC, recipient of an Officership of the National Order of the Legion of Honour

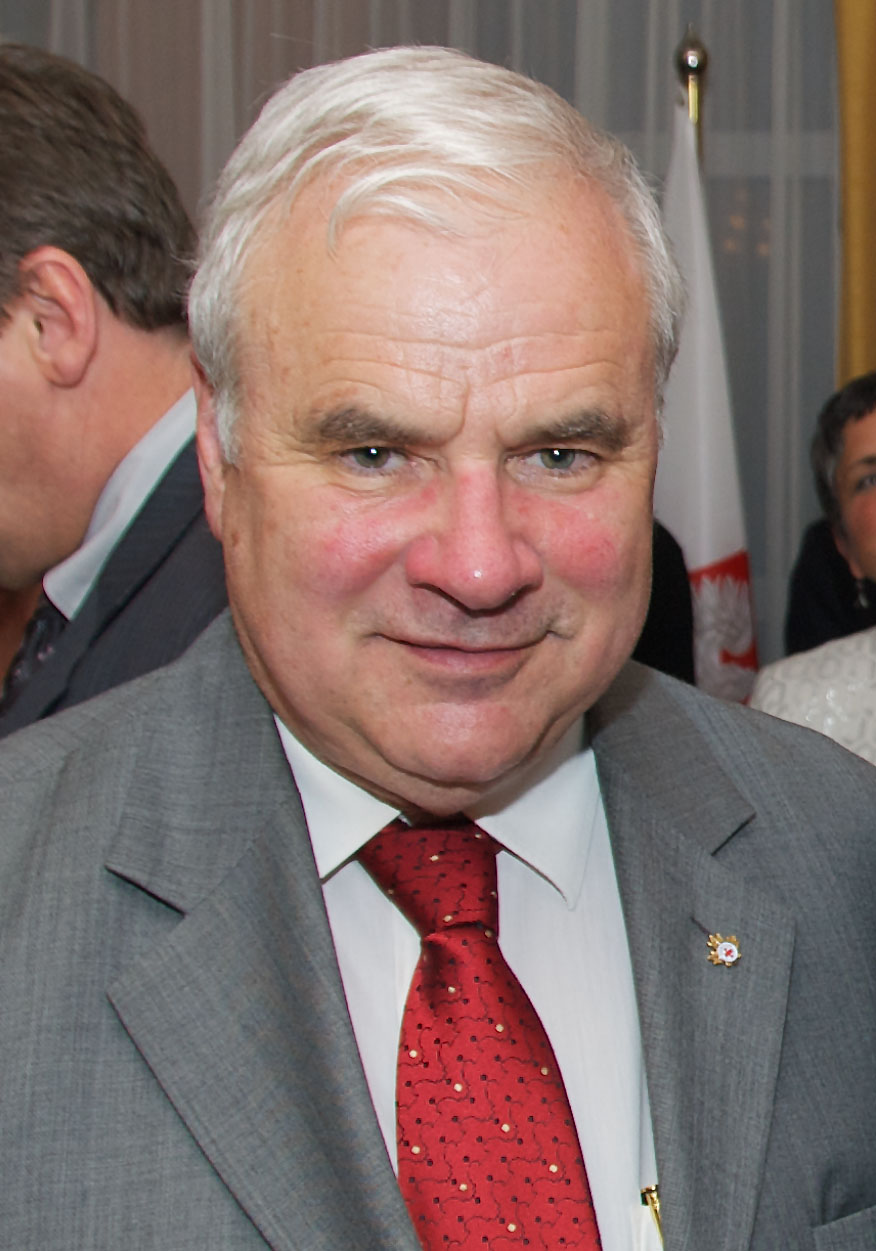
The Honourable Peter Milliken, PC, OC, FRSC, recipient of the German Grand Cross 1st Class of the Order of Merit

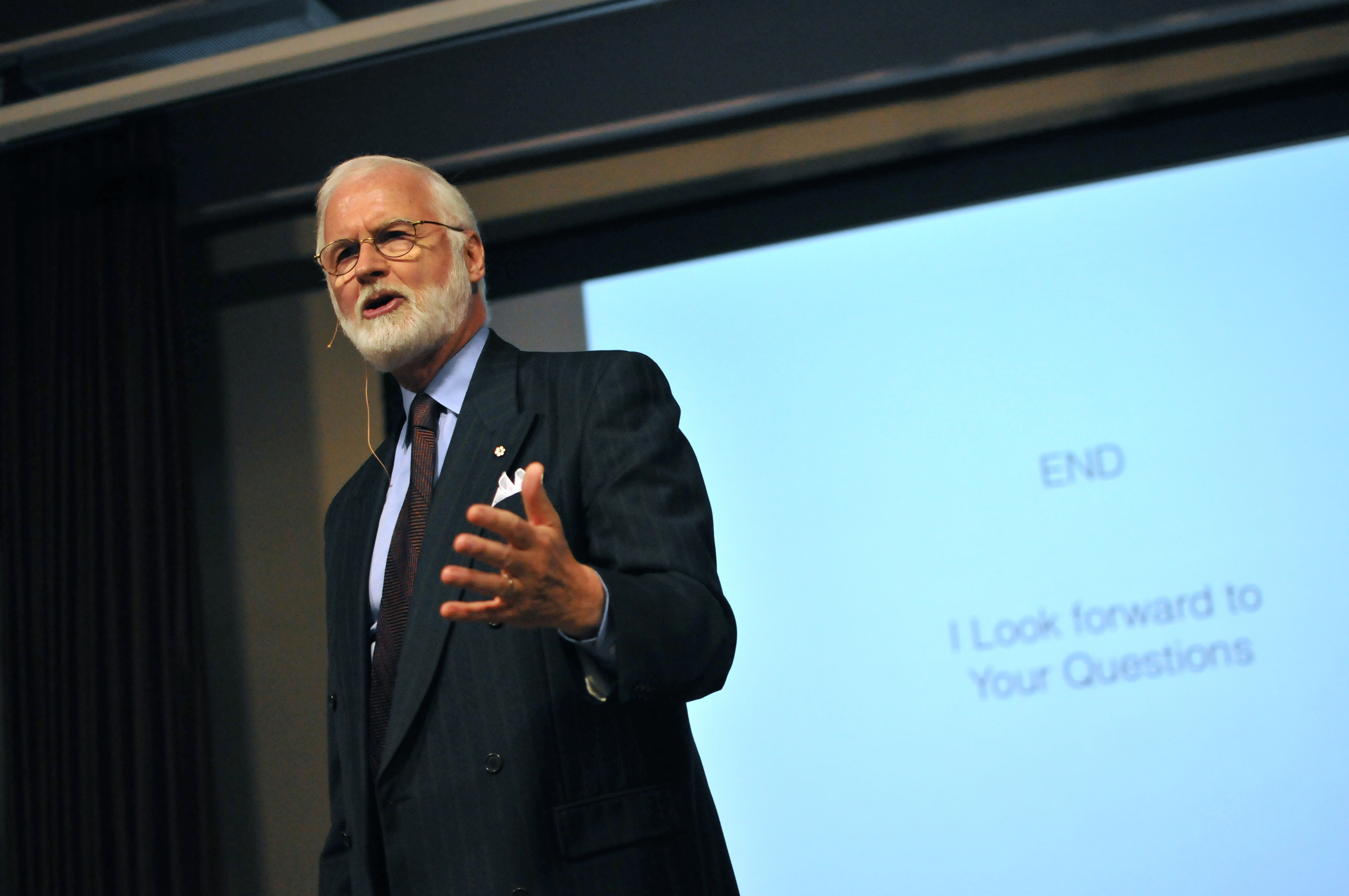
Robert R. Fowler OC, recipient of the Spanish Cross of the Order of Civil Merit

=== From Her Majesty The Queen in Right of Australia ===
==== Honorary Member of the Order of Australia ====
- Ms. Anne Raymond (posthumous)

=== From Her Majesty The Queen in Right of the United Kingdom ===
==== Commander of the Most Excellent Order of the British Empire ====
- Dr. Robert Frederick (Fred) Mulder

==== Member of the Most Excellent Order of the British Empire ====
- Inspector Joseph Andrew Arsenault

==== Operational Service Medal (Afghanistan) ====
- Private Mario Santos Duarte

=== From the President of the Republic of Austria ===
==== Decoration of Merit (Gold) ====
- Mr. Eric Bissell

==== Austrian Decoration for Science and Art ====
- Professor Ian Hacking

=== From His Majesty The King of the Belgians ===
==== Grand Officer of the Order of the Crown ====
- The Honourable Peter G. MacKay

=== From His Majesty The Sultan and Yang Di-Pertuan of Brunei Darussalam ===
==== Meritorious Service Medal ====
- Dr. Roger Neil Lawrey

=== From the President of the Republic of Finland ===
==== Cross of Merit of the White Rose of Finland ====
- Mr. Vilho Kalervo Vuorensivu

=== From the President of the French Republic ===
==== Officer of the National Order of the Legion of Honour ====
- Ms. Helen Vari
- Lieutenant-General Charles Bouchard

==== Knight of the National Order of the Legion of Honour ====
- Mr. James Doak
- Mr. Paul Desmarais, Jr.
- Ms. Monique Leroux
- Ms. Marie-Lucie Morin

==== Grand Officer of the National Order of Merit ====
- Ms. Monique Colette

==== Commander of the National Order of Merit ====
- Mr. Denis Brière
- Mr. Claude Roquet

==== Knight of the National Order of Merit ====
- Brigadier-General Frederick George Bigelow
- Lieutenant-Colonel André M. Levesque (retired)
- Mr. Benoît Pelletier

==== Officer of the Order of the Academic Palms ====
- Mr. Louis-Edmond Hamelin

==== Knight of the Order of the Academic Palms ====
- Mr. Jean-Claude Boulanger
- Mr. Guy Breton
- Mr. Marcel Proulx
- Ms. Monique Cormier

==== National Defence Medal, Gold Echelon with clasp "Gendarmerie nationale" ====
- Captain Claude Germain Jr.
- Chief Inspector Claude Levac

==== National Defence Medal, Gold Echelon with Infantry clasp ====
- Colonel Keith Lawrence

=== From the President of the Federal Republic of Germany ===
==== Grand Cross 1st Class of the Order of Merit ====
- The Honourable Peter Andrew Stewart Milliken

==== Officer's Cross of the Order of Merit of the Federal Republic of Germany ====
- Professor Carl Gerard Amrhein

==== Silver Cross of Honour of the Bundeswehr ====
- Major Edmund Roberds

=== From the President of the Republic of Honduras ===
==== Grand Cross of the Order of San Francisco Morazán ====
- Mr. Neil Reeder

=== From the President of the Italian Republic ===
==== Grand Officer of the Order of Merit of the Italian Republic ====
- Mr. Wilfrid Wilkinson

==== Officer of the Order of Merit of the Italian Republic ====
- Mr. Alberto Leone
- Mr. Antonio Porretta
- Mr. Lucio Sacchetti

==== Knight of the Order of Merit of the Italian Republic ====
- Mr. Anthony C. Masi
- Ms. Maria Rosaria (Mariella) Pandolfi
- Mr. Nunzio Tumino
- Dr. Biagio "Gino" Fallone
- Mr. Giovanni Rapana

==== Grand Officer of the Order of the Star of Solidarity ====
- Mr. Blair Hankey

==== Commander of the Order of the Star of Solidarity ====
- Mr. Elio Costa
- Mr. Marcello Danesi
- Mr. Antonio Franceschetti
- Mr. Anthony Lacavera
- Mr. Domenico Pietropaolo

==== Knight of the Order of the Star of Solidarity ====
- Mr. Pierre Jutras
- Mr. Steven Muzzo
- Mr. Alfonso Ciasca
- Ms. Filomena Frisina
- Ms. Maria Domenica Cesta
- Mr. Mario Chieffo
- Mr. Elio De Lauri
- Ms. Gemma Favero Scotton
- Mr. David Gordon Franklin
- Mr. Pietro Girardi
- Mrs. Carmela Liparoti
- Mr. David Shannon

=== From His Majesty The Emperor of Japan ===
==== Order of the Rising Sun, Gold Rays with Neck Ribbon ====
- Mr. Arthur Tsuneo Wakabayashi

==== Order of the Rising Sun, Gold and Silver Rays ====
- Mr. Mistugi Kikuchi

=== From the President of Latvia ===
==== Order of the Three Stars, Category 5 ====
- Mr. Laimons Ozols
- Mr. Varimants Pludons

=== From the President of Malaysia ===
==== Medal of the Order of the Defender of the Realm (Pingat Pangkuan Negara) ====
- Ms. Sui Toh Ting (Lucy)

=== From Her Majesty The Queen of the Netherlands ===
==== Knight of the Order of Orange Nassau ====
- Mr. Gauke Cornelis Jan de Jonge

=== From the Secretary General of the North Atlantic Treaty Organisation ===
==== NATO Meritorious Service Medal ====
- Lieutenant-Colonel Paul D. Fleet
- Major Sylvain Gazaille
- Lieutenant-Colonel Doug Grimshaw
- Master Warrant Officer Lewis H. Johnstone
- Master Warrant Officer Lorraine Pilon

=== From the President of the Republic of Poland ===
==== Commander's Cross of the Order of Merit of the Republic of Poland ====
- Mr. Krzysztof Korwin-Kuczynski

==== Officer's Cross of the Order of Merit of the Republic of Poland ====
- Mr. Mieczyslaw Librowicz
- Mr. Wiktor Askanas
- Mr. Edward Whitley (posthumous)
- Major-General David A. Fraser (Retired)

==== Knight's Cross of the Order of Merit of the Republic of Poland ====
- Mr. Krzysztof Tomczak
- Mr. Jan Szymanski
- Mr. Piotr Nawrot

==== Gold Cross of Merit of the Republic of Poland ====
- Mr. Józef Gola
- Mr. Tadeusz Lis
- Ms. Barbara Séguin
- Mrs. Emilia Pohl
- Mr. Leszek Galko
- Mr. Tomasz Grasza

==== Silver Cross of Merit ====
- Mr. Pierre Jutras
- Ms. Miroslawa Suchecka
- Mr. Tadeusz Barnowski
- Mrs. Jadwiga Gacek
- Mrs. Krystyna Szydlowska

=== From the President of the Russian Federation ===
==== Ushakov Medal ====
- Mr. Real J. DeGuire
- Mr. Kenneth J. Philbin
- Mr. Thomas D. W. McCulloch
- Mr. W. B. Deedo
- Mr. Arthur Hills
- Mr. F. Wm. Macdonell
- Mr. J. G. Calfat
- Mr. Claude Edward Joyal
- Mr. Donald McAdam
- Mr. Donald D. Gregor
- Mr. Dougald M. Lamb
- Mr. Howard Hazzard
- Mr. Thomas Arnott Whitefield
- Mr. John Tonks
- Mr. Harold McNairn
- Mr. Gilbert Fraser
- Mr. Robert Thomas Grogan
- Mr. James Dykes
- Mr. Millard Arthur Keith
- Mr. James William Galloway
- Mr. George Brown
- Mr. Richard Henry
- Mr. Frederick G. Pangborn
- Mr. Richard Green
- Mr. William McNutt
- Mr. Reynold Marshall
- Mr. John Murphy
- Mr. Archibald Ross
- Mr. Lloyd Bergstrom
- Mr. Leonard Martyn
- Mr. Gilbert J. Kenny
- Mr. Uziel Adler Abramovich
- Mr. James Stewart
- Mr. Wesley John Kaufman
- Mr. Ronald W. Carrol
- Mr. Andrew Gillespie
- Mr. Alfred M. Porter
- Mr. William R. Nicoll
- Mr. Paul B. Coombs
- Mr. Bill Easton
- Mr. Gordon Blair
- Mr. Ward Mortenson
- Mr. William F. Palmer
- Mr. Warren Miles
- Mr. John Lonergan
- Mr. Garfield Harris
- Mr. J. Walter McNeish
- Mr. Andrew J. Lucas
- Mr. William Georgeson
- Mr. Quentin D. Jacks
- Mr. Thomas H. Parker
- Mr. George Foot
- Mr. John Gordon Quinn
- Mr. Christopher Bolger
- Mr. Wallace L. Beaver
- Mr. Harold Nelson Watts
- Mr. Alan S. May
- Mr. Alexander G. MacLachlan
- Mr. Richard Richardson
- Mr. John Harmer
- Mr. R. W. Parkin
- Mr. Eric Stott
- Mr. Bayard Galbraith
- Mr. John MacNeil
- Mr. J. A. Irvine
- Mr. William Herbert Atkinson
- Mr. Alex Polovin
- Mr. Jack Hendrie
- Mr. David Kirby
- Mr. James Sisler

=== From His Majesty The King of Spain ===
==== Cross of the Order of Civil Merit ====
- Mr. Robert R. Fowler
- Mr. Louis Guay
- Mr. Albert Edwin Honeywell

=== From the President of the United States of America ===
==== Commander of the Legion of Merit ====
- General Walter J. Natynczyk

==== Officer of the Legion of Merit ====
- Colonel Martin P. Galvin
- Colonel Todd Nelson Balfe
- Major-General Stuart A. Beare
- Lieutenant-General Charles Bouchard
- Brigadier-General Dean J. Milner
- Colonel Steven J. R. Whelan
- Brigadier-General James Ferron
- Major-General Pierre J. Forgues
- Brigadier-General David G. Neasmith
- Brigadier-General Eric G. Tremblay
- Brigadier-General Peter J. Atkinson

===== Second award of an officership of the Legion of Merit =====
- Lieutenant-General Charles Bouchard

==== Bronze Star Medal ====
- Lieutenant-Colonel Timothy M. Datchko
- Major Annette M. Dombrowski
- Lieutenant-Colonel William P. J. Graydon
- Major Stephen G. Hale
- Colonel Acton L. Kilby
- Lieutenant-Colonel Craig S. Landry
- Chief Warrant Officer Daniel T. Moyer
- Colonel David A. Patterson
- Lieutenant-Colonel Ronald A. Puddister
- Master Warrant Officer J. P. Jean-Claude Senecal
- Lieutenant-Colonel M. James Stalker
- Lieutenant-Colonel J. H. M. Pierre St-Laurent
- Lieutenant-Colonel Michael R. Voith
- Lieutenant-Commander David P. Fahey
- Major Ralf J. Hennig
- Lieutenant-Commander Stephan J. A. Julien
- Lieutenant-Colonel Terence J. Leigh
- Major Peter S. Fedak
- Captain Travis G. Sherriff

==== Meritorious Service Medal, First Gold Star ====
- Lieutenant-Colonel Patrick H. McAdam

==== Meritorious Service Medal, First Oak Leaf Cluster ====
- Lieutenant-Colonel Lawrence James Zaporzan
- Lieutenant-Colonel William N. Franklin

==== Meritorious Service Medal ====
- Lieutenant-Colonel Brook G. Bangsboll
- Lieutenant-Colonel Paul J. Doyle
- Lieutenant-Colonel Timothy J. Garriock
- Major Marie Ryan-Roberts
- Major Joseph André Pierre Viens
- Lieutenant-Commander Michael J. Barefoot
- Major C. Allan Champion
- Captain Erik D. Deneau
- Lieutenant-Commander Robert A. Forbes
- Lieutenant-Commander Stephan P. King
- Captain(N) Kurt N. Salchert
- Colonel Paul E. Scagnetti
- Major Ralph H. Urzinger
- Lieutenant-Colonel Brigid White Dooley-Tremblay
- Colonel Charles S. Hamel
- Captain Kendra Ann Hartery
- Major Sherry A. MacLeod
- Major Kazimir T. Oreziak
- Lieutenant-Colonel Paul J. Peyton
- Chief Warrant Officer Gabriel Chartier
- Colonel Patrick Kelly
- Chief Warrant Officer Daniel T. Moyer
- Lieutenant-Colonel Warren A. Rego
- Chief Petty Officer 1st Class Trevor J. Spring
- Lieutenant-Colonel Nicolas Stanton
- Major Jean-François Tremblay
- Colonel Ronald Ubbens
- Major Ross B. Allan
- Major Randall A. Smyth
- Major-General Christine Whitecross
- Lieutenant-Colonel Christopher S. Allen

==== Air Medal ====
- Major J. Sylvester Abbott
- Major Richard A. J. Jolette
- Warrant Officer Robert B. McKendry
- Major Bruce P. Barnes

== Erratums of Commonwealth and Foreign Orders, Decorations and Medal awarded to Canadians ==
=== Correction of 30 June 2012 ===
- The notice published on page 1212 of the April 28, 2012, issue of the Canada Gazette, Part I, is hereby amended as follows: From the President of the French Republic, the National Defence Medal, Silver Echelon with Infantry clasp to Colonel Keith Lawrence

=== Correction of 28 July 2012 ===
- The notice published on page 1776 of the June 30, 2012 issue of the Canada Gazette, Part I, is hereby amended as follows: From His Majesty The Emperor of Japan, the Order of the Rising Sun, Gold and Silver Rays to Mr. Mitsugi Kikuchi

=== Correction of 24 November 2012 ===
- The notice published on page 2676 of the September 22, 2012 issue of the Canada Gazette, Part I, is hereby amended as follows: From the President of the Russian Federation, the Ushakov Medal to Mr. Ryland Marshall.
