= Mike Murphy (ice hockey, born 1950) =

Canadian ice hockey player and coach

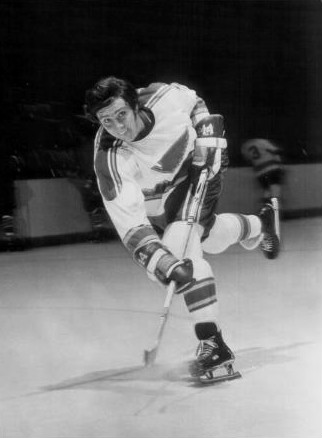
- Murphy with the St. Louis Blues in 1971
- Born: September 12, 1950 (age 76) Toronto, Ontario, Canada
- Height: 6 ft 1 in (185 cm)
- Weight: 180 lb (82 kg; 12 st 12 lb)
- Position: Right wing
- Shot: Right
- Played for: St. Louis Blues; New York Rangers; Los Angeles Kings
- National team: Canada
- NHL draft: 25th overall, 1970; New York Rangers
- Playing career: 1971–1983
Medal record
Representing Canada
Ice hockey
World Championships
| Bronze medal – third place | 1978 Prague |

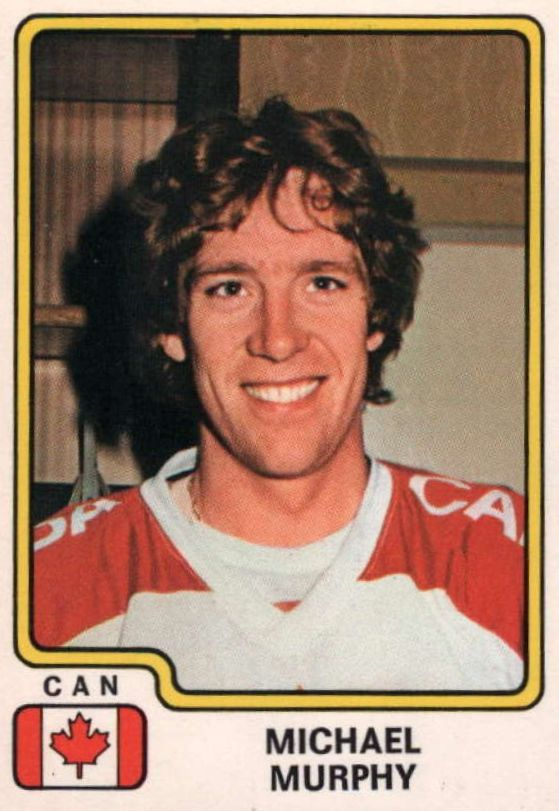
Mike Murphy with the Team Canada in 1979

Michael John Murphy (born September 12, 1950) is a Canadian former professional ice hockey player who played in the National Hockey League for 13 years for the St. Louis Blues, New York Rangers and the Los Angeles Kings and has been assistant and head coach in the NHL for the Los Angeles Kings, Ottawa Senators, Vancouver Canucks, Toronto Maple Leafs and the New York Rangers. Murphy also played for Team Canada, winning a bronze medal in 1978, and coached Team Canada, International Hockey League (IHL). Murphy also worked as the Senior Vice President of the NHL's hockey operations.

== Playing career ==
As a youth, he and teammate Peter Sullivan played in the 1963 Quebec International Pee-Wee Hockey Tournament with a minor ice hockey from North York.

In the National Hockey League, he played for the St. Louis Blues, New York Rangers, Los Angeles Kings. Murphy was captain of the Los Angeles Kings for 7 years and played in Los Angeles for 10 years. He played for Team Canada at the World Championships in 1978 (bronze medal) and was an assistant coach for Team Canada at the 1986 World Championships. Murphy was selected to play in the NHL All-Star game in 1980. His career totals in the NHL are 231 goals, and 318 assists for 556 total points in 831 games played.

== Coaching career ==
Upon retiring from hockey with the Los Angeles Kings, he became their head coach. Murphy went on to be assistant coach of the Vancouver Canucks, Ottawa Senators, and New York Rangers. Murphy was promoted from assistant coach of the Vancouver Canucks to head coach of their farm team, the Milwaukee Admirals of the American Hockey League (AHL). Murphy left Milwaukee for an assistant coach position with the Toronto Maple Leafs hockey team. Murphy was then promoted to be the 24th head coach of the Toronto Maple Leafs.

== NHL vice-president ==
As NHL vice-president of hockey operations, Murphy was forced to make a tough call during game three of the first round of the 2010 Stanley Cup. Murphy disallowed what was first ruled as a 3-4 goal on the ice for the Vancouver Canucks against Murphy's former team, the Los Angeles Kings. The incident is one of many that has called for greater NHL transparency from the public. The official ruling stated that "Video Review was used to determine whether the puck was kicked into the net by Vancouver's Daniel Sedin with a kicking motion. Upon review, it was determined that the puck was propelled into the net by a kicking motion. This was not a deflection. The direction the puck was moving and the force of the skate were the determining factors in concluding 'no goal'". According to rule 49.2 of the NHL, "A puck that is directed into the net by an attacking player’s skate shall be a legitimate goal as long as no distinct kicking motion is evident." Later, in an interview with CBC Hockey Night in Canada, Murphy admitted that the puck was not kicked in a "distinct kicking motion", as the official NHL rules require, yet Murphy maintained his position on the judgement.

== Career statistics ==
=== Regular season and playoffs ===
| | | | Regular season | | | | | Playoffs |
| Season | Team | League | GP | G | A | Pts | PIM | GP | G | A | Pts | PIM |
|---|---|---|---|---|---|---|---|---|---|---|---|---|
| 1968–69 | Toronto Marlboros | OHA-Jr. | 44 | 16 | 23 | 39 | 53 | 6 | 1 | 4 | 5 | 6 |
| 1969–70 | Toronto Marlboros | OHA-Jr. | 54 | 23 | 27 | 50 | 68 | 6 | 7 | 6 | 13 | 16 |
| 1970–71 | Omaha Knights | CHL | 59 | 24 | 47 | 71 | 37 | 11 | 4 | 8 | 12 | 17 |
| 1971–72 | Omaha Knights | CHL | 8 | 1 | 4 | 5 | 12 | — | — | — | — | — |
| 1971–72 | St. Louis Blues | NHL | 63 | 20 | 23 | 43 | 19 | 11 | 2 | 3 | 5 | 6 |
| 1972–73 | St. Louis Blues | NHL | 64 | 18 | 27 | 45 | 48 | — | — | — | — | — |
| 1972–73 | New York Rangers | NHL | 15 | 4 | 4 | 8 | 5 | 10 | 0 | 0 | 0 | 0 |
| 1973–74 | New York Rangers | NHL | 16 | 2 | 1 | 3 | 0 | — | — | — | — | — |
| 1973–74 | Los Angeles Kings | NHL | 53 | 13 | 16 | 29 | 38 | 5 | 0 | 4 | 4 | 0 |
| 1974–75 | Los Angeles Kings | NHL | 78 | 30 | 38 | 68 | 44 | 3 | 3 | 0 | 3 | 4 |
| 1975–76 | Los Angeles Kings | NHL | 80 | 26 | 42 | 68 | 61 | 9 | 1 | 4 | 5 | 6 |
| 1976–77 | Los Angeles Kings | NHL | 76 | 25 | 36 | 61 | 58 | 9 | 4 | 9 | 13 | 4 |
| 1977–78 | Los Angeles Kings | NHL | 72 | 20 | 36 | 56 | 48 | 2 | 0 | 0 | 0 | 0 |
| 1978–79 | Los Angeles Kings | NHL | 64 | 16 | 29 | 45 | 38 | 2 | 0 | 1 | 1 | 0 |
| 1979–80 | Los Angeles Kings | NHL | 80 | 27 | 22 | 49 | 29 | 4 | 1 | 0 | 1 | 2 |
| 1980–81 | Los Angeles Kings | NHL | 68 | 16 | 23 | 39 | 54 | 1 | 1 | 0 | 1 | 0 |
| 1981–82 | Los Angeles Kings | NHL | 28 | 5 | 10 | 15 | 20 | 10 | 2 | 1 | 3 | 32 |
| 1982–83 | Los Angeles Kings | NHL | 74 | 16 | 11 | 27 | 52 | — | — | — | — | — |
| NHL totals | | | 831 | 238 | 318 | 556 | 514 | 66 | 13 | 23 | 36 | 54 |

== Coaching record ==
| Team | Year | Regular season | | | | | | Postseason |
| Team | Year | G | W | L | T | Pts | Finish | Result |
|---|---|---|---|---|---|---|---|---|
| LAK | 1986–87 | 38 | 13 | 21 | 4 | (70) | 4th in Smythe | Lost in First Round |
| LAK | 1987–88 | 27 | 7 | 16 | 4 | (68) | (fired) | — |
| TOR | 1996–97 | 82 | 30 | 44 | 8 | 68 | 6th in Central | Missed playoffs |
| TOR | 1997–98 | 82 | 30 | 43 | 9 | 69 | 6th in Central | Missed playoffs |
| Total | | 229 | 80 | 124 | 27 | | | |

=== International ===
| Year | Team | Event | GP | G | A | Pts | PIM |
|---|---|---|---|---|---|---|---|
| 1978 | Canada | WC | 10 | 1 | 4 | 5 | 16 |

| Preceded by Terry Harper | Los Angeles Kings captain 1975–1981 | Succeeded by Dave Lewis |
| Preceded by Pat Quinn | Head coach of the Los Angeles Kings; 1986–1987 | Succeeded by Rogatien Vachon |
| Preceded by Nick Beverley | Head coach of the Toronto Maple Leafs; 1996–1998 | Succeeded by Pat Quinn |
